= List of airports in Mozambique =

This is a list of airports in Mozambique, sorted by location.

== Airports ==
Airport names shown in bold indicate the airport has scheduled service on commercial airlines.

City served	ICAO	IATA	Airport name	Coordinates
Angoche	FQAG	ANO	Angoche Airport	16°10′55″S 39°56′41″E
Bazaruto Island		BZB	Bazaruto Island Airport	21°32′34″S 35°28′22″E
Beira	FQBR	BEW	**Beira Airport**	19°47′47″S 34°54′27″E
Benguerra Island		BCW	Benguerra Island Airport	21°51′11″S 35°26′18″E
Bilene	FQBI		Bilene Airport	25°15′58″S 33°14′19″E
Chimoio	FQCH	VPY	**Chimoio Airport**	19°09′04″S 33°25′44″E
Cuamba	FQCB	FXO	Cuamba Airport	14°49′02″S 36°31′54″E
Inhaca	FQIA		Inhaca Airport	25°59′52″S 32°55′45″E
Indigo Bay, Bazaruto Island		IBL	Indigo Bay Lodge Airport	21°42′26″S 35°27′08″E
Inhambane	FQIN	INH	**Inhambane Airport**	23°52′35″S 35°24′30″E
Lichinga	FQLC	VXC	**Lichinga Airport**	13°16′26″S 35°15′58″E
Lumbo	FQLU	LFB	Lumbo Airport	15°01′59″S 40°40′18″E
Maputo	FQMA	MPM	**Maputo International Airport**	25°55′15″S 32°34′21″E
Marrupa	FQMR		Marrupa Airport	13°13′30″S 37°33′07″E
Mocímboa da Praia	FQMP	MZB	Mocímboa da Praia Airport	11°21′42″S 40°21′17″E
Mueda	FQMD	MUD	Mueda Airport	11°40′22″S 39°33′47″E
Nacala	FQNC	MNC	**Nacala Airport**	14°29′17″S 40°42′44″E
Nampula	FQNP	APL	**Nampula Airport**	15°06′20″S 39°16′54″E
Pemba / Porto Amelia	FQPB	POL	**Pemba Airport**	12°59′12″S 40°31′20″E
Ponta do Ouro	FQPO	PDD	Ponta do Ouro Airport	26°49′36″S 32°50′18″E
Quelimane	FQQL	UEL	**Quelimane Airport**	17°51′19″S 36°52′08″E
Songo	FQSG		Songo Airport	15°36′09″S 32°46′23″E
Tete	FQTT	TET	**Chingozi Airport**	16°06′17″S 33°38′24″E
Ulongwe	FQUG		Ulongwe Airport	14°42′16″S 34°21′08″E
Vilanculos (Vilankulo)	FQVL	VNX	**Vilankulo Airport** (Vilanculos Airport)	22°01′06″S 35°18′47″E
Xai-Xai	FQFN	VJB	**Xai-Xai Chongoene Airport**	25°02′16″S 33°37′38″E

== See also ==
- Transport in Mozambique
- List of airports by ICAO code: F#FQ - Mozambique
- Wikipedia: WikiProject Aviation/Airline destination lists: Africa#Mozambique
