= List of Portuguese Air Force bases =

This is a list of air bases, airfields and other facilities of the Portuguese Air Force (PoAF) and of the Portuguese Army's former aviation service.

The Air Force gives different designations to its aviation installations depending on their size, capabilities and roles:

- Air Base (Portuguese: Base Aérea, BA)
- Base Airfield (Portuguese: Aeródromo Base, AB)
- Maneuvers Airfield (Portuguese: Aeródromo de Manobra, AM)
- Transit Airfield (Portuguese: Aeródromo de Trânsito, AT)

== Air bases ==
Installation	Designation	Abbr.	ICAO	Location	Date	Notes
Alverca Airfield (Note: Portuguese: Campo de Alverca)			LPAR	Alverca do Ribatejo, Vila Franca de Xira	1919, est.	Currently operated by OGMA
Amadora Airfield (Note: Portuguese: Campo da Amadora)				Amadora, Lisbon	1919–1938	
Beira Air Base	Air Base No. 10	BA10	FQBR	Beira, Mozambique	1962–1975	
Beja Air Base	Air Base No. 11	BA11	LPBJ	Beja	1964–current	
Bissau Air Base	Air Base No. 12	BA12	GGOV	Bissau, Guinea-Bissau	1965–1975	
Espinho Aerodrome (Note: Portuguese: Aeródromo de Espinho)			LPIN	Espinho	1932–1953	Re-designated as Base Airfield No. 1 (AB1) in 1953
Lajes Air Base	Air Base No. 4	BA4	LPLA	Lajes, Azores	1946–current	
Lajes Air Base	Air Base No. 5	BA5	LPLA	Lajes, Azores	1942–1946	
Luanda Air Base	Air Base No. 9	BA9	FNLU	Luanda, Angola	1962–1975	
Monte Real Air Base	Air Base No. 5	BA5	LPMR	Monte Real, Leiria	1959–current	
Montijo Air Base	Air Base No. 6	BA6	LPMT	Montijo, Setúbal	1953–current	Former Sacadura Cabral Naval Aviation Centre of the Portuguese Naval Aviation
Ota Air Base	Air Base No. 2	BA2	LPOT	Ota	1938–1992	Disbanded as an operational air base, re-designated as Military and Technical Formation Center of the Air Force (CFMTFA)
Ovar Air Base	Air Base No. 8	BA8	LPOV	Ovar	2023-current	Renamed from Maneuvers Airfield No. 1 to Air Base No. 8 in 2023
Lisbon Base Airfield (Note: Portuguese: Campo Base de Lisboa)			LPPT	Portela, Lisbon	1937–1955	Re-designated as Base Airfield No. 1 (AB1)
Rabo de Peixe Air Base	Air Base No. 4	BA4		Rabo de Peixe, São Miguel Island, Azores	1942–1946	First to receive the designation of Air Base No. 4 (BA4)
São Jacinto Air Base	Air Base No. 7	BA7	LPAV	Aveiro, Portugal	1958–1978	Former Gago Coutinho Naval Aviation School of the Portuguese Naval Aviation
São Jacinto Air Base	Air Base No. 5	BA5	LPAV	Aveiro, Portugal	1953–1957	Former Gago Coutinho Naval Aviation School of the Portuguese Naval Aviation
Sintra Air Base	Air Base No. 1	BA1	LPST	Sintra, Lisbon	1939–current	
Sintra Air Base	Granja do Marquês Airfield (Note: Portuguese: Campo da Granja do Marquês)		LPST	Sintra, Lisbon	1920–1939	Home base of the School of Military Aeronautics (E.A.M.), re-designated as Air Base No. 1 (BA1)
Tancos Air Base	Air Base No. 3	BA3	LPTN	Tancos, Vila Nova da Barquinha	1952–1993	Currently operated by the Portuguese Army as part of the Tancos Military Complex
Tancos Air Base	Tancos Airfield (Note: Portuguese: Campo de Tancos)		LPTN	Tancos, Vila Nova da Barquinha	1923–1952	Currently operated by the Portuguese Army as part of the Tancos Military Complex
Vila Nova da Rainha Airfield (Note: Portuguese: Campo de Vila Nova da Rainha)		V.N.R.			1916–1920	

== Auxiliary airfields ==
Installation	Abbr.	ICAO	Location	Date	Notes
Base Airfield No. 1	AB1	LPIN	Espinho	1953–1956	
Base Airfield No. 1	AB1		Portela, Lisbon	1955–1978	
Base Airfield No. 2	AB2	LPAV	Aveiro, Portugal	1957–1958	Re-designated as Air Base No. 7 (BA7)
Base Airfield No. 2	AB2	GGOV	Bissau, Guinea-Bissau	1961–1965	Re-designated as Air Base No. 12 (BA12)
Base Airfield No. 3	AB3	FNNG	Negage, Angola	1961–1975	
Base Airfield No. 4	AB4	FNSA	Henrique de Carvalho, Angola	1963–1975	
Base Airfield No. 5	AB5	FQNC	Nacala, Mozambique	1961–1975	
Base Airfield No. 6	AB6	FQCB	Cuamba, Mozambique	1961–1975	
Base Airfield No. 7	AB7	FQTT	Tete, Mozambique	1962–1975	
Base Airfield No. 8	AB8	FQMA	Maputo, Mozambique	1963–1975	
Maneuvers Airfield No. 1	AM1	LPOV	Maceda, Ovar, Aveiro	1957–2023	Re-designated as Air Base No. 8 (BA8)
Maneuvers Airfield No. 2	AM2	LPAV	Aveiro, Portugal	1978–1992	Deactivated, installations transferred to the Portuguese Army
Maneuvers Airfield No. 3	AM3	LPPS	Porto Santo, Madeira	1974–current	
Maneuvers Airfield No. 31	AM31	FNMQ	Maquela do Zombo, Angola		Dependent of Base Airfield No. 3 (AB3)
Maneuvers Airfield No. 32	AM32	FNTO	Toto, Uíge, Angola		Dependent of Base Airfield No. 3 (AB3)
Maneuvers Airfield No. 33	AM33	FNMA	Malanje, Angola	1962–1975	Dependent of Base Airfield No. 3 (AB3)
Maneuvers Airfield No. 41	AM41	FNCH	Portugália, Angola	1963–1975	Dependent of Base Airfield No. 4 (AB4)
Maneuvers Airfield No. 42	AM42	FNCX	Camaxilo, Angola	1963–1975	Dependent of Base Airfield No. 4 (AB4)
Maneuvers Airfield No. 43	AM43	FNCZ	Cazombo, Moxico, Angola	1963–1975	Dependent of Base Airfield No. 4 (AB4)
Maneuvers Airfield No. 51	AM51	FQMD	Mueda, Mozambique	1962–1975	Dependent of Base Airfield No. 5 (AB5)
Maneuvers Airfield No. 52	AM52	FQNP	Nampula, Mozambique		Dependent of Base Airfield No. 5 (AB5)
Maneuvers Airfield No. 61	AM61	FQLC	Vila Cabral, Niassa, Mozambique	1962–1975	Dependent of Base Airfield No. 6 (AB6)
Maneuvers Airfield No. 62	AM62	FQMR	Marrupa, Mozambique		Dependent of Base Airfield No. 6 (AB6)
Maneuvers Airfield No. 71	AM71		Furacungo, Mozambique	1962–1975	Dependent of Base Airfield No. 7 (AB7)
Maneuvers Airfield No. 72	AM72		Chicoa, Mozambique		Dependent of Base Airfield No. 7 (AB7)
Maneuvers Airfield No. 73	AM73		Mutarara, Mozambique		Dependent of Base Airfield No. 7 (AB7)
Maneuvers Airfield No. 95	AM95	FNCA	Cabinda, Angola		Dependent of Air Base No. 9 (BA9)
Transit Airfield No. 1	AT1	GVAC	Sal, Cape Verde	?–1975	
Transit Airfield No. 1	AT1	LPPT	Portela, Lisbon	1952–current	
Transit Airfield No. 2	AT2	FPST	São Tomé, São Tomé and Príncipe	1961–1975	

== See also ==
- Portuguese Air Force
- Portuguese Army
- Portuguese Naval Aviation
- Portuguese Armed Forces
- Portuguese Colonial War
- Azores Air Zone Command
- List of aircraft of the Portuguese Air Force
- List of Portuguese Air Force aircraft squadrons
- Aviation in the Azores
- Portuguese Army Light Aviation Unit
- Portuguese military aircraft serials
