= Ethiopian Mozambique Airlines =

IATA	ICAO	Call sign
ET	EMZ	EMOZ
- Commenced operations: 1 December 2018; 7 years ago
- Ceased operations: 6 May 2021; 4 years ago
- Operating bases: Maputo International Airport
- Destinations: 10 (March 2019)
- Parent company: Ethiopian Airlines (2018-2021)
- Key people: Redi Yesuf (CEO)
- Website: Official site

Ethiopian Mozambique Airlines was an airline based at Maputo International Airport that flew to cities throughout Mozambique. The Ethiopian Airlines subsidiary launched operations in December 2018 using Q400 aircraft; its fleet included the Boeing 737-800 as well. It thus became the third airline to service the Mozambican domestic market, joining LAM Mozambique Airlines and Fastjet. The company connected Maputo to nine destinations in the country as of March 2019. In May 2021 the airline ceased all operations.

== History ==
In May 2018 Ethiopian Airlines publicized its intent to establish a subsidiary based in Mozambique as part of its expansion plan entitled Vision 2025, which seeks to amplify connectivity across the African continent. Ethiopian Mozambique Airlines (EMA) became the third carrier to operate in the Mozambican domestic market, following LAM Mozambique Airlines and Fastjet. The LAM trade union protested against the creation of the airline, claiming that it was essentially an Ethiopian carrier being allowed to operate flights within another country. The union elaborated that EMA would solely benefit the Ethiopian economy rather than the Mozambican one. The Mozambique Civil Aviation Institute, which regulates commercial aviation in the country, rejected the union's argument; it indicated that EMA was registered in Mozambique and had followed the standard certification process.

EMA initiated its services on 1 December 2018 utilizing two Q400 turboprop aircraft. Its route network at the time comprised Beira, Maputo, Nampula, Pemba, Quelimane, and Tete.

On 6 May 2021 the company ceased all its operations. The company tells in a statement: “Despite the challenges, Ethiopian Mozambique Airlines remained resiliently operational until the economic effects of the pandemic became so severe that they made it impossible to continue due to the drastic drop in demand for travel in the domestic market.”

== Destinations ==
In March 2019 Ethiopian Mozambique Airlines was offering flights to the destinations listed below.

- Mozambique
  - Beira - Beira Airport
  - Chimoio - Chimoio Airport
  - Lichinga - Lichinga Airport
  - Maputo - Maputo International Airport (Base)
  - Nacala - Nacala Airport
  - Nampula - Nampula Airport
  - Pemba - Pemba Airport
  - Quelimane - Quelimane Airport
  - Tete - Chingozi Airport
  - Vilankulo - Vilankulo Airport

== Fleet ==
Ethiopian Mozambique Airlines made use of Boeing 737-800 and Q400 aircraft on its services. These aircraft were provided by parent company Ethiopian Airlines which have since then returned.
