= Sud Aviation Alouette III in Portuguese service =

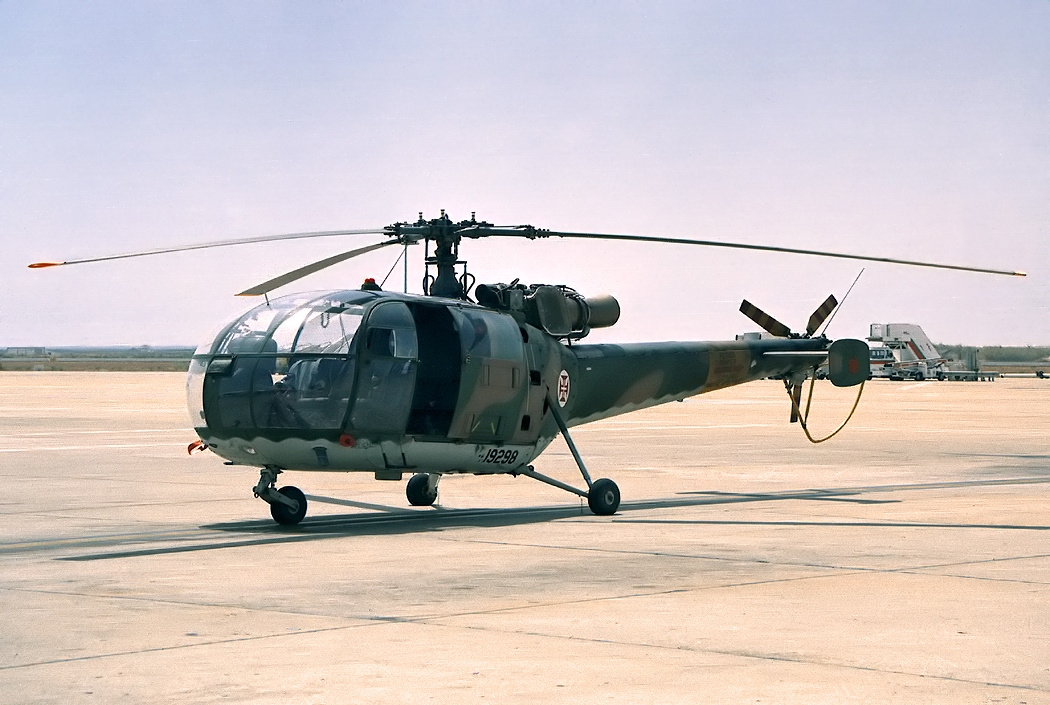
- Portuguese Air Force Alouette III

General information
- Type: Light utility helicopter
- Manufacturer: Sud Aviation; Aérospatiale
- Owners: Portuguese Air Force
- Serial: 9251–9316, 9332–9401, 9412–9417

History
- First flight: June 18, 1963
- In service: 1963–2020

The Portuguese Air Force (PoAF) has operated Sud Aviation Alouette III light utility helicopters since 1963. The Portuguese government originally purchased 142 helicopters to replace the Sud Aviation Alouette II and for use in the roles of tactical transport, medical evacuation, and flight training, with several being adopted for combat air support.

== Acquisition ==
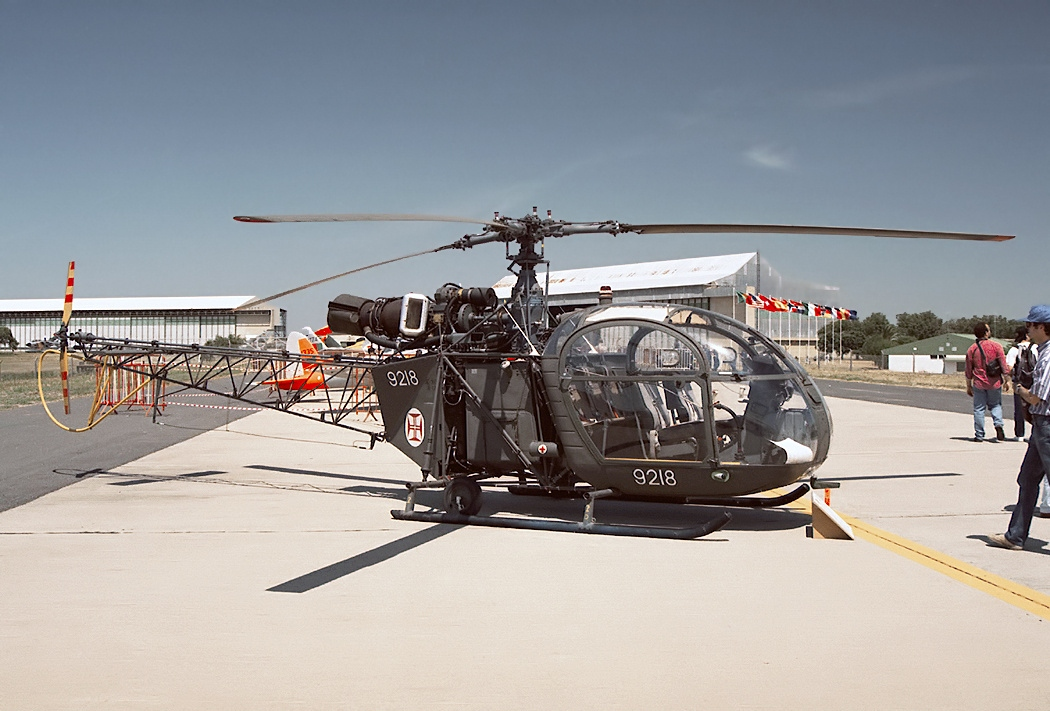
Portuguese Air Force Alouette II, which also were operated in Africa during the Overseas War

Prior to the acquisition of the Alouette III, Portugal had operated a single Sikorsky H-19, used exclusively in search and rescue, and seven Sud Aviation Alouette II. The acquisition of the latter, with the training of the first pilots and technicians in France, in 1957, and the arrival of the first helicopters on January 27, 1958, finally allowed the Portuguese Air Force (PAF) to create a helicopter force and establish a military doctrine.

With the start of the Overseas War (Portuguese: Guerra do Ultramar), in 1961, and the subsequent gained experience in the operational use of the Alouette II in Africa, the military became aware of the necessity of a more capable helicopter and in greater numbers. Therefore, a demonstration between the Agusta-Bell AB 204B and Sud Aviation Alouette III took place in 1963 at OGMA (then part of the PAF) to select a new helicopter type to complement and eventually replace the Alouette II. The Portuguese government then selected the Alouette III and ordered the first 80 helicopters from Sud Aviation (later Aérospatiale). A total of 142 units were purchased and delivered between April 1963 and February 1975.

All helicopters introduced into service were allocated a serial number from one of three sets: 9251 to 9316, 9332 to 9401, and 9412 to 9417.

== Operational service ==
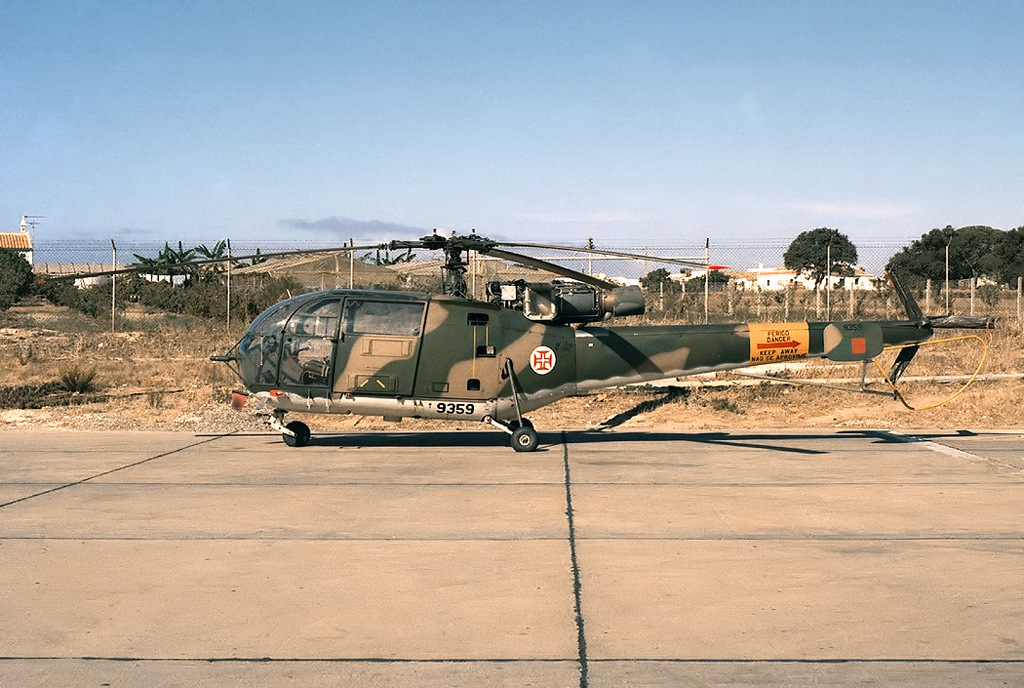
Portuguese Air Force Alouette III

=== Introduction into service ===
The first twelve Alouette III of the Portuguese Air Force were directly sent from Sud Aviation installation's in France to Angola. These aircraft arrived on April 25, 1963, and were based at Air Base No. 9 (Portuguese: Base Aérea Nº 9, BA9) in Luanda, where the first flight of a Portuguese Alouette III took place on June 18, 1963.

The remaining helicopters were sent to the units in Africa with only a few being sent to Portugal, where they were based at Air Base No. 3 (Portuguese: Base Aérea Nº 3, BA3), in Tancos, for training. The latter equipped the Airplane and Helicopter Mix Instruction Squadron (Portuguese: Esquadra Mista de Instrução de Aviões e Helicópteros, EMIAH).

In Guinea the Alouette III was operated by 122 Squadron "Canibais", based at Air Base No. 12 (Portuguese: Base Aérea Nº 12, BA12), Bissalanca, with the first operational flight taking place on November 3, 1965. This squadron was composed of two flights: "Canibais" (Cannibals) and "Lobo Mau" (Bad wolf), which had its Alouette III's equipped with cannons for combat support. The use of helicopters in Guinea was specially important due to its local natural terrain that made transportation by road more difficult and dangerous.

The Alouette III in Angola was operated by 94 Squadron, based at Luanda, while operating in all of the Angolan territory. They were initially mainly used in the north area and permanent detachments were later established in Cuito Cuanavale until the end of the war.

In 1969, with a high number of Alouette III in service, the Air Force established 402 Squadron "Saltimbancos" at the Luso Auxiliary Aerodrome, part of the Base Airfield No. 4 (Portuguese: Aeródromo Base Nº 4, AB4).

Alouette III operations in Mozambique started in 1967. These helicopters were operated by 503 Squadron "Índios", based at Base Airfield No. 5 (Portuguese: Aeródromo Base Nº 5, AB5) in Nacala, and 703 Squadron "Vampiros", based at Base Airfield No. 7 (Portuguese: Aeródromo Base Nº 7, AB7) in Tete.

503 Squadron was stationed at Maneuvers Airfield No. 52 (Portuguese: Aeródromo de Manobra Nº 52, AM52) in Nampula for several years, and maintained permanent detachments of five Alouette III at Maneuvers Airfield No. 51 (Portuguese: Aeródromo de Manobra Nº 51, AM51), in Mueda, and of two Alouette III at Maneuvers Airfield No. 61 (Portuguese: Aeródromo de Manobra Nº 61, AM61), in Vila Cabral, Niassa.

703 Squadron maintained temporary detachments at Furancungo, Macanga, and Mutarara. It later started maintaining a permanent detachment in Estima due to the increase in terrorist attacks against the Cahora Bassa Dam's construction site.

In 1968, the EMIAH was re-designated as Helicopter Complementary Instruction Squadron (Portuguese: Esquadra de Instrução Complementar de Helicópteros, EICH) No. 33 "Zangões" (Drones). Starting in March 1971, this squadron was temporarily transferred from Tancos (BA3) to Montijo (BA6) due to sabotage at the aforementioned air base.

=== Combat in Africa ===
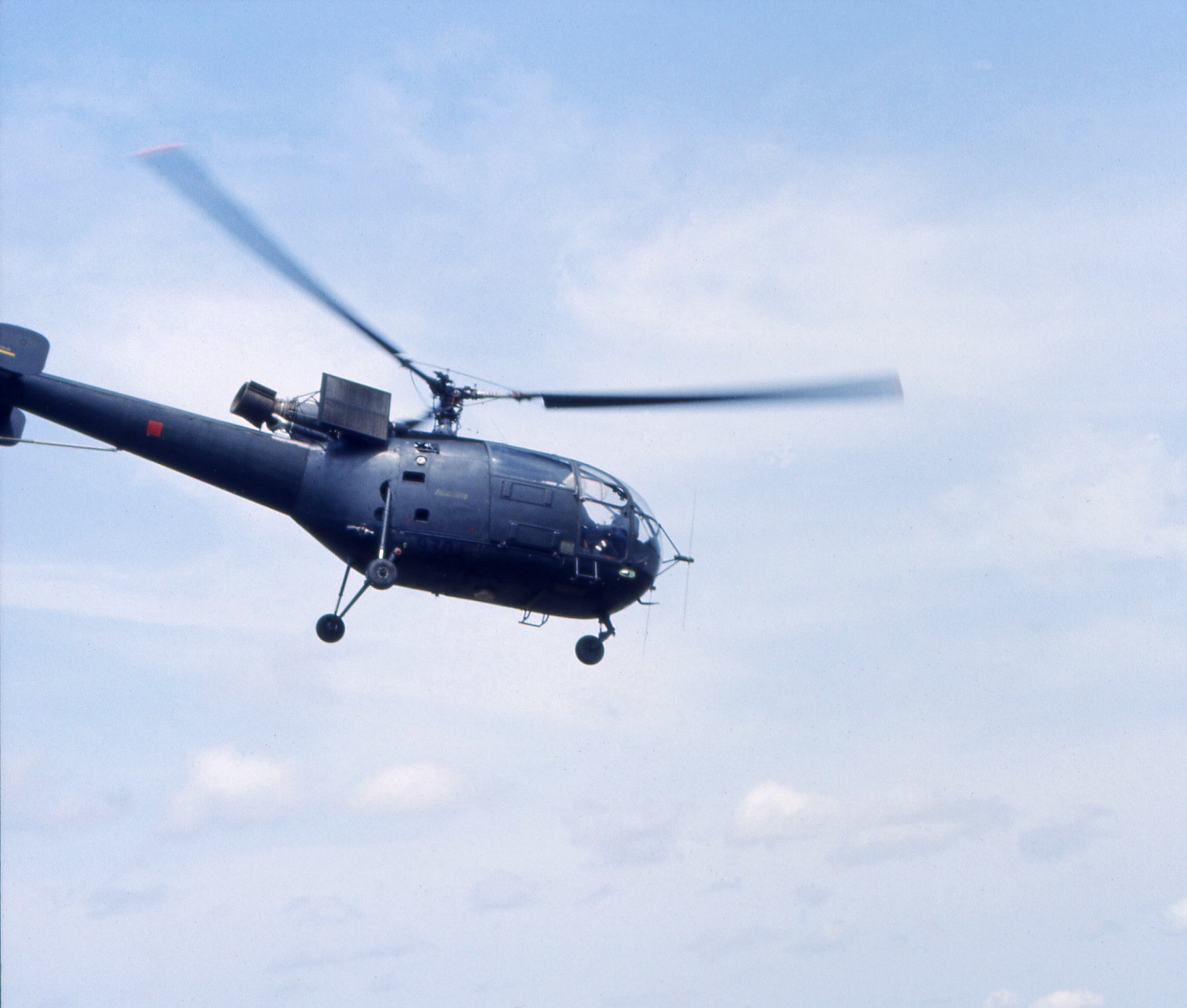
Alouette III during a medical evacuation in Guinea

Portugal became the first country to use the Alouette III in combat during the Overseas War, where it was operated extensively by the Portuguese Air Force in the Portuguese overseas territories until the end of the war and the subsequent withdrawal of all Portuguese troops from Africa in 1974 and 1975. Helicopters, particularly the Alouette III, became an important asset during the conflict in counter-insurgency operations, as they allowed for rapid deployment of ground forces, as well as close air support, and delivery of supplies to remote areas and the ability to withdraw wounded troops during combat.

The Air Force also operated the Alouette III in the general transport, liaison, and reconnaissance rules. In addition to its squadrons operating from their assigned bases and maintaining detachments at forward airfields, squadrons in Africa would also occasionally maintain temporary detachments at remote Portuguese Army outposts and were often used for hunting local game.

The use of the Alouette III in air assaults revealed early on the need for fire support during the deployment of the ground forces, with air crews using their personal assault rifles, which were considered to be ineffective. As such the Air Force tested at Tancos an Alouette III equipped with the same machine gun pods as the ones used on the North American T-6, also operated in Africa. This configuration was also considered to be ineffective.

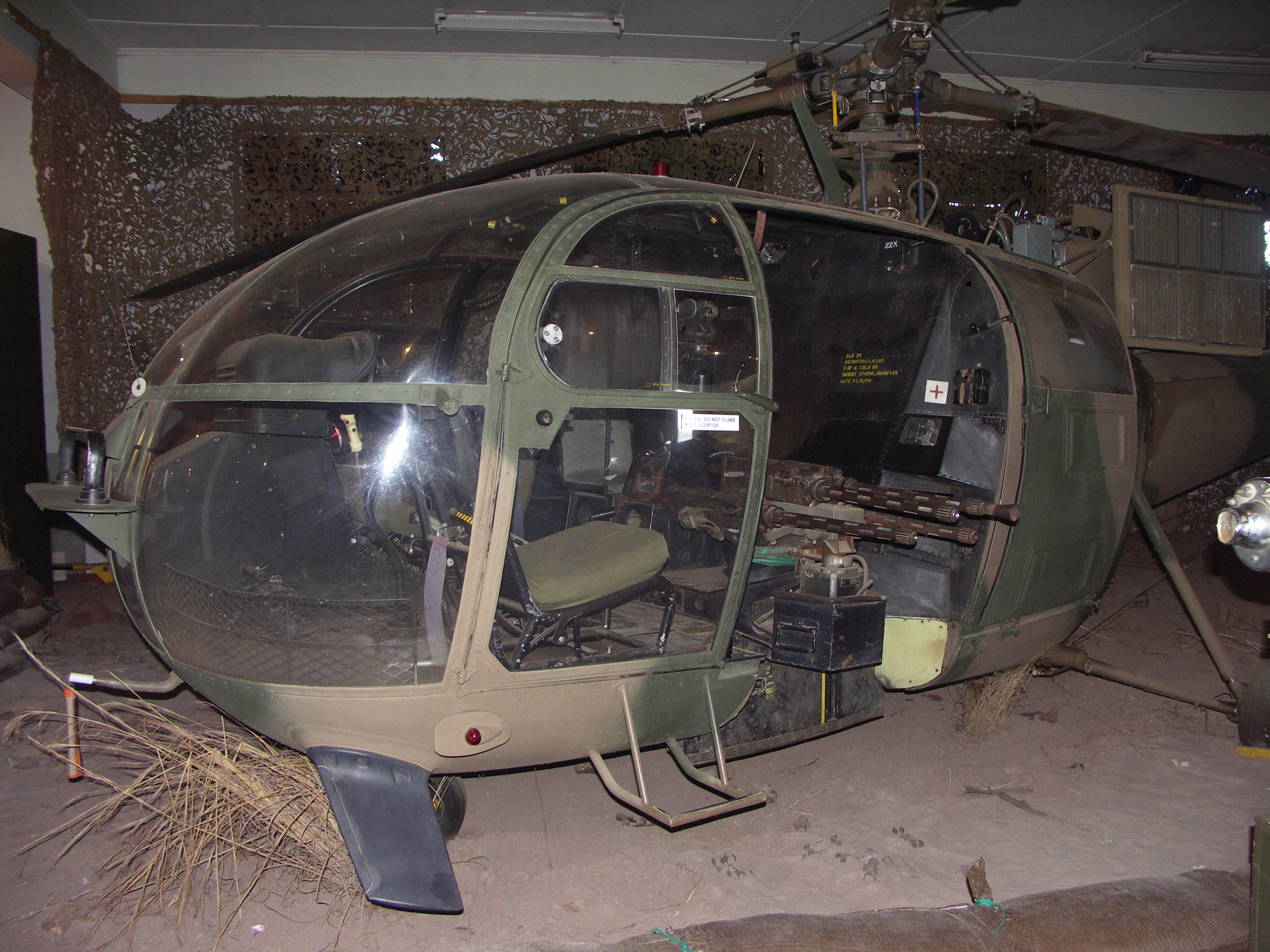
South African Air Force Alouette III modified as a gunship, similar to the Portuguese version

In 1964 the units in Angola modified some Alouette III helicopters with a wider side door and installed a pair of M2 Browning machine guns in the rear capable of being fired from the left side door. After initial operational testing these modified aircraft, nicknamed Falcão (Falcon), started being used in the protection and support of the non-armed Alouette IIIs, nicknamed Cotovia (Lark).

Two years later, in 1966, the Air Force adopted a permanent solution for their armed Alouette III: a special version with a single MG 151 20 mm autocannon mounted in the rear in order to fire from the left side door. The MG 151 showed to be ideal since it suffered from less recoil than the M2 Browning machine guns and, as such, caused less vibrations on the aircraft. This version of the Alouette III was designated heli-canhão (heli-cannon) and gained the nickname lobo mau (big bad wolf), after the 122 Squadron's nickname for flight no. 2 which operated them in Angola.

In addition to supporting air assault operations, the heli-canhão was also used to support horse mounted combat patrols of the Army. Later in 1973, the use of rocket launcher pods on the Alouette III was tested but was never used in combat during the war.

The Alouette III helicopters used for tactical transport in air assault operations differed from other versions by having the front left seat facing backwards to allow its occupant to exit the helicopter more quickly through the back side door.

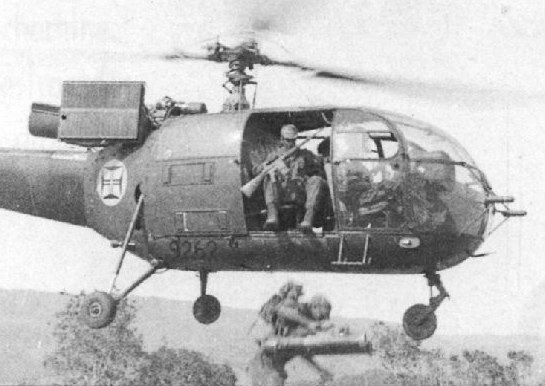
Portuguese paratroopers jump from an Alouette III in an air assault operation in Angola

Portuguese air assault operations were executed by a group of five to six transport helicopters and a group of one or two helicopter gunships, which made the final approach to the target area at low altitude and by taking advantage of the terrain and vegetation as cover. Each transport helicopter, later nicknamed canibais (cannibals), would usually carry five paratroopers (then part of the Air Force) or Portuguese Army Commandos. The practice was for the canibais to approach the landing zone and launch its troops while hovering two or three meters from the ground, instead of landing, by having them jump out of the helicopter.

After the troops landed the canibais would leave the combat area and the Alouette III gunship would stay and provide support to the ground forces during the ground assault, by destroying the enemy resistance and providing firepower with its 20 mm autocannon. Finished the ground combat, the transport helicopters would return, in a first wave collecting the wounded and subsequently the remaining troops.

As the war progressed, and as enemy forces were equipped with improved anti-aircraft weapons, the Alouette III were also used in combat search and rescue of downed Portuguese pilots. In 1973, the pilot of a shot down Fiat G.91 in Guinea was rescued by four Alouette III gunships as he was surrounded by enemy troops.

During the war, from 1963 to 1974, a total of 30 Alouette III were destroyed, resulting in the loss of 30 crew members and 10 passengers.

=== Post-war ===
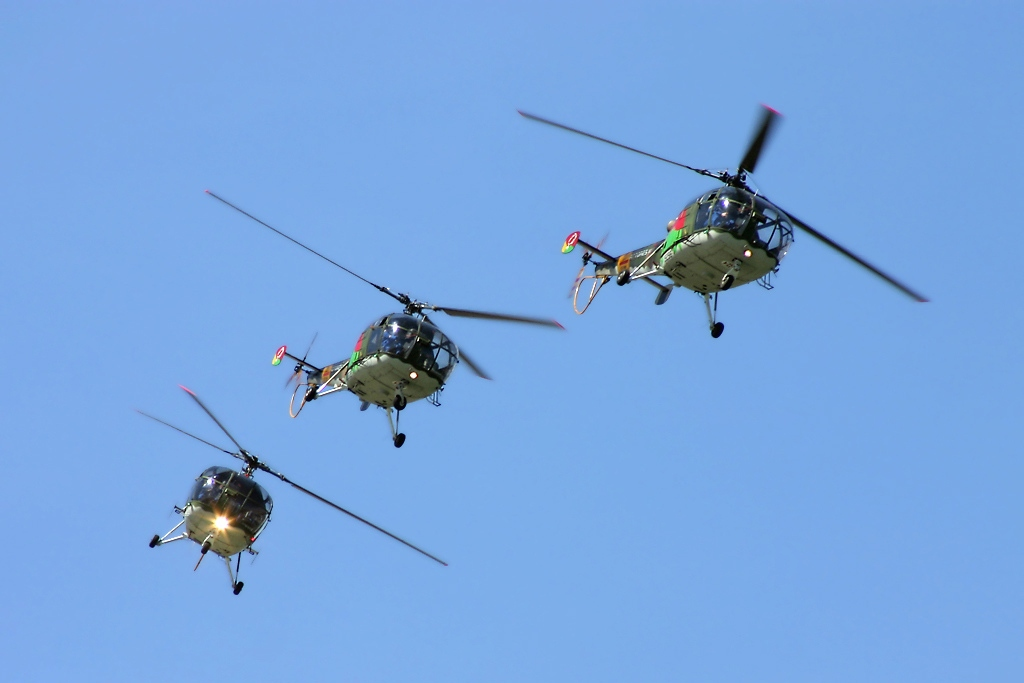
Rotores de Portugal helicopters performing aerobatics

In 1975, with the end of the war in Africa the previous year, all surviving Alouette III returned to mainland Portugal and were based at Air Base No. 3, in Tancos, and Air Base No. 6 (Portuguese: Base Aérea Nº 6, BA6), in Montijo. The helicopters in Tancos were operated by the existing 33 Squadron, while in Montijo these were operated by a squadron of the newly created Helicopter Air Group (Portuguese: Grupo Aéreo de Helicópteros, GAH).

In April 1976, 33 Squadron formed a four Alouette III aerobatic team, Rotores de Portugal, to perform at the Portuguese Air Force's 24th anniversary air show at Sintra Air Base that same year.

With the 1978 reorganization of the Air Force, the Alouette III started being operated by the following squadrons:

- 111 Squadron based at Tancos, responsible for fixed-wing multi-engine aircraft and helicopter training;
- 551 Squadron based at Montijo, responsible for tactical transport, offensive air support, and search and rescue, with some Alouette III being equipped with a winch and floats;
- 552 Squadron (former 33 Sqn.) based at Tancos, responsible for tactical transport and offensive air support.

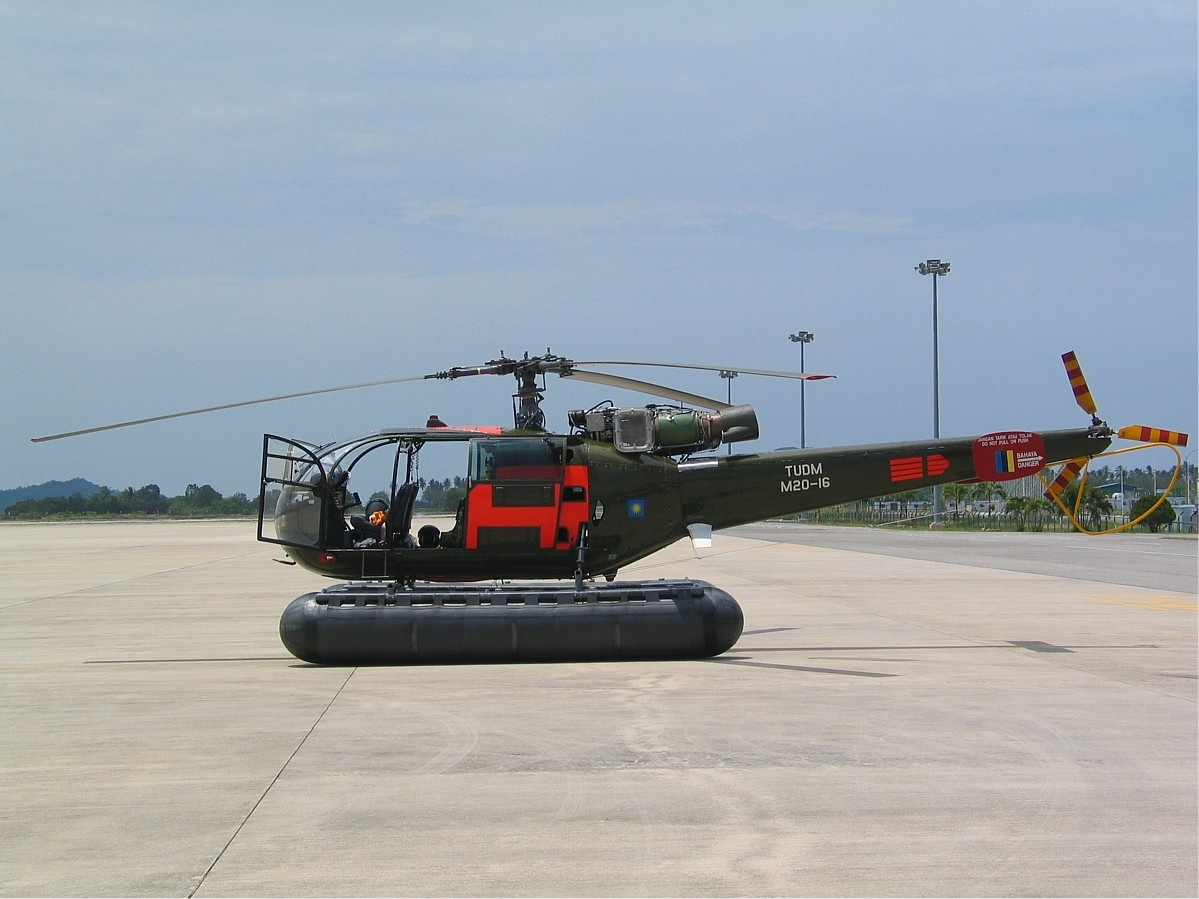
Royal Malaysian Air Force Alouette III with floats as those used on Portuguese Alouette III dedicated to the search-and-rescue role until the 1990s

That year the Air Force operated a total of 36 Alouette III helicopters, which was reduced to 26 helicopters by 1988.

The Alouette III was also employed in the combat of wildfires from the late 1970s to early 1980s by being used to transport first response firefighter teams and as forward air controllers for other firefighting aircraft.

Further reorganization of the Air Force in 1986 resulted in 551 Squadron being disbanded in September and all helicopters being transferred to 552 Squadron. Later in 1993, 111 Squadron was disbanded, with all its helicopters being transferred to 552 Squadron, which was relocated to Air Base No. 11 (Portuguese: Base Aérea Nº 11, BA11), in Beja. The squadron became responsible for transport, tactical support, basic and advanced flight instruction, and coastal search and rescue.

552 Squadron maintained a detachment with four Alouette III helicopters and 31 personnel, between February 2000 and July 2002, in East Timor as part of the United Nations missions. During that time, a total of 127 personnel served in East Timor and executed a 2,700 flight hours, transporting 10,000 passengers and 131 wounded people.

Presently, 552 Squadron provides helicopter flight training to PoAF, Portuguese Navy, and Portuguese Army pilots. It also maintains a permanent search and rescue detachment at Maneuvers Airfield No. 1 (Portuguese: Aeródromo de Manobra Nº 1, AM1), at Ovar, with one Alouette III.

In May 2017, the Portuguese Air Force finally decided to replace the aging Alouette III fleet which then counts 8 helicopters. Five AgustaWestland AW119 Koala plus two options are ordered in October 2018 for €20 million ($23 million). Deliveries of the helicopters begin in late 2018, running until 2020.

== See also ==
- Portuguese Air Force
- Aérospatiale Alouette III
- Portuguese Colonial War
- South African Border War
- Parachute Troops School
- Caçadores
- Alcora Exercise
- Cold War
- Rotores de Portugal
- List of Portuguese Air Force bases
- List of Portuguese Air Force aircraft squadrons
