= Admira António =

Mozambican pilot

Admira Antonio
- Born: Mozambique
- Occupation: Pilot

Admira António is a Mozambican pilot, the first women to fly an airplane in Mozambique.

António started flying in 2011, learning at the Lanserie Flight Centre in South Africa. After training in France to pilot an Embraer-145, she joined LAM Mozambique Airlines in 2013. She qualified as commander in 2018.
