= BZB =

BZB or bzb may refer to:

- BZB, the IATA code for Bazaruto Island Airport, Bazaruto Archipelago, Mozambique
- BZB, the Indian Railways station code for Burra Bazar railway station, Kolkata, India
- bzb, the ISO 639-3 code for Andio language, Sulawesi
