= Quelimane Airport =

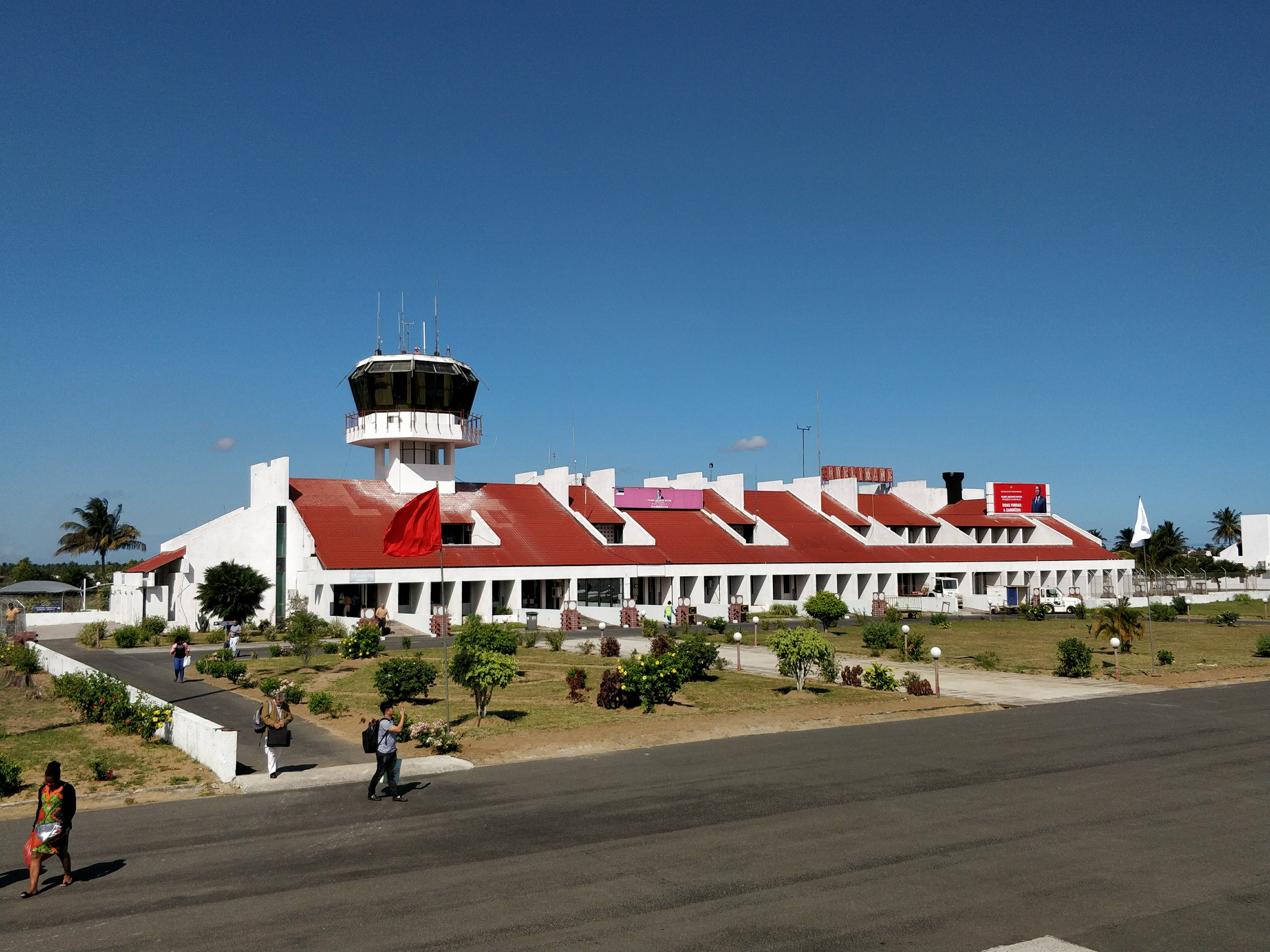
- IATA: UEL; ICAO: FQQL

Summary
- Airport type: Public
- Operator: Aeroportos de Mocambique (Mozambique Airports Company)
- Serves: Quelimane
- Location: Quelimane, Mozambique
- Elevation AMSL: 36 ft / 11 m
- Coordinates: 17°51′19.6″S 36°52′07.3″E

Map
- Location of airport in Mozambique

Runways
Direction	Length		Surface
Direction	ft	m	Surface
09/27	2,980	908	Gravel
18/36	5,905	1,800	Asphalt

Quelimane Airport is an airport in Quelimane, Mozambique (IATA: UEL, ICAO: FQQL).

== Airlines and destinations ==
Airlines	Destinations
LAM Mozambique Airlines	Beira, Maputo, Nampula, Tete

== Accidents and incidents ==
- On 23 February 1944 a Lockheed L-14 CR-AAV of DETA - Direcção de Exploração de Transportes Aéreos crashed on takeoff at Quelimane Airport, killing all 13 on board.
- On 21 April 1988, Douglas C-47A N47FE of African Air Carriers was damaged beyond economic repair in a take-off accident. Both crew were killed, one other person on board was seriously injured. The aircraft may have been shot down.
- On 27 March 1983 a Boeing 737-200 C9-BAB LAM Mozambique Airlines had an Undercarriage failure after landing some 400 metres (1,300 ft) short of the runway at Quelimane Airport. All 110 on board survived.
