= Xai-Xai Chongoene Airport =

Commercial airport in Mozambique

Xai-Xai Chongoene Airport Aeroporto Xai Xai
- IATA: VJB; ICAO: FQXA

Summary
- Opened: 29 November 2021

Map

Runways
Direction	Length		Surface
Direction	m	ft	Surface
02/20	1,800	5,906	Concrete

Xai-Xai Chongoene Airport (IATA: VJB, ICAO: FQXA), whose official name is Filipe Jacinto Nyusi Airport, is a commercial airport in Xai-Xai, Mozambique.

== History ==
The airport was built with Chinese government funds. On 29 November 2021, the airport was inaugurated by Mozambique's President, Filipe Nyusi.

== Airlines and destinations ==
Airlines	Destinations
LAM Mozambique Airlines	Chimoio, Maputo
