= Chimoio Airport =

Airport in Mozambique

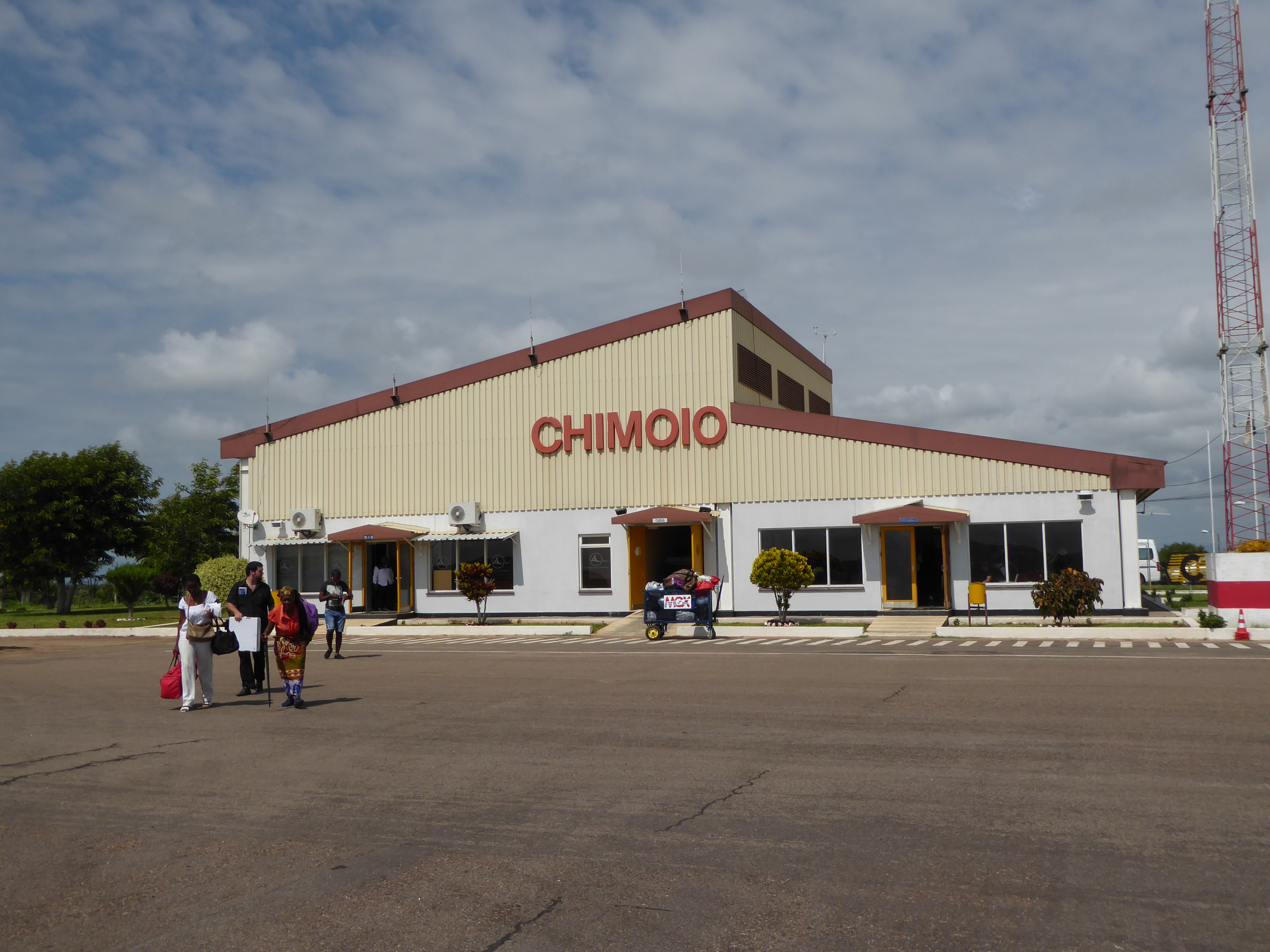
- IATA: VPY; ICAO: FQCH

Summary
- Serves: Chimoio
- Location: Mozambique
- Elevation AMSL: 2,272 ft / 693 m
- Coordinates: 19°08′55″S 33°25′45″E

Map

Runways
Direction	Length		Surface
Direction	ft	m	Surface
01/19	7,905	2,410	Asphalt
- Source: Google Maps

Chimoio Airport (IATA: VPY, ICAO: FQCH) is an airport in Chimoio, Mozambique.

== Airlines and destinations ==
Airlines	Destinations
LAM Mozambique Airlines	Beira, Maputo, Xai-Xai
