= Bazaruto Island Airport =

- IATA: BZB; ICAO: none

Summary
- Airport type: Public
- Owner: Aeroportos de Moçambique
- Location: Bazaruto Island
- Coordinates: 21°32′34″S 35°28′22″E

Map
- Location in Mozambique

Runways
Direction	Length		Surface
Direction	ft	m	Surface
02/20	4,922	1,500	Asphalt
- Sources: World Aero Data Google Maps

Bazaruto Island Airport (IATA: BZB) is an airport serving Bazaruto Island, Bazaruto Archipelago, Mozambique, and the Bazaruto National Park.

== See also ==
- List of airports in Mozambique
