= Cuamba Airport =

- IATA: FXO; ICAO: FQCB

Summary
- Airport type: Public
- Serves: Cuamba, Mozambique
- Elevation AMSL: 1,919 ft / 585 m
- Coordinates: 14°49′03″S 36°31′42″E

Map
- Location of airport in Mozambique

Runways
Direction	Length		Surface
Direction	m	ft	Surface
04/22	2,500	8,202	Asphalt
- Source: Google Maps

Cuamba Airport (IATA: FXO, ICAO: FQCB) is an airport serving Cuamba, a city in the Niassa Province in Mozambique. The airport is in the southern part of the city and is a major airport in the province of Niassa in central Mozambique.

There are no scheduled flights in or out of the city. Kaya Airlines is the major airline that comes to the city, with non-scheduled flights from Nampula.

== Facilities ==
The airport resides at an elevation of 1,919 feet (585 m) above mean sea level. It has one runway which is 2,500 metres (8,202 ft) in length.
