= Moçambique Expresso =

Mozambican airline

IATA	ICAO	Call sign
-	MXE	MOZAMBIQUE EXPRESS
- Founded: September 1995
- Hubs: Maputo International Airport
- Fleet size: 3
- Parent company: LAM Mozambique Airlines
- Headquarters: Beira, Mozambique
- Key people: António Neves (CEO)

Moçambique Expresso, s.a.r.l. is an airline based in Beira, Mozambique. It operates domestic and regional scheduled and charter services. Its main base is Maputo International Airport.

== History ==
The airline was established in September 1995 as Special Operations Department of LAM Mozambique Airlines. It started operations and became Moçambique Expresso in 1995 as an independent airline. It is wholly owned by LAM and has 50 employees (at March 2007).

== Destinations ==
Moçambique Expresso operates within the route network of its parent LAM Mozambique Airlines.

== Fleet ==
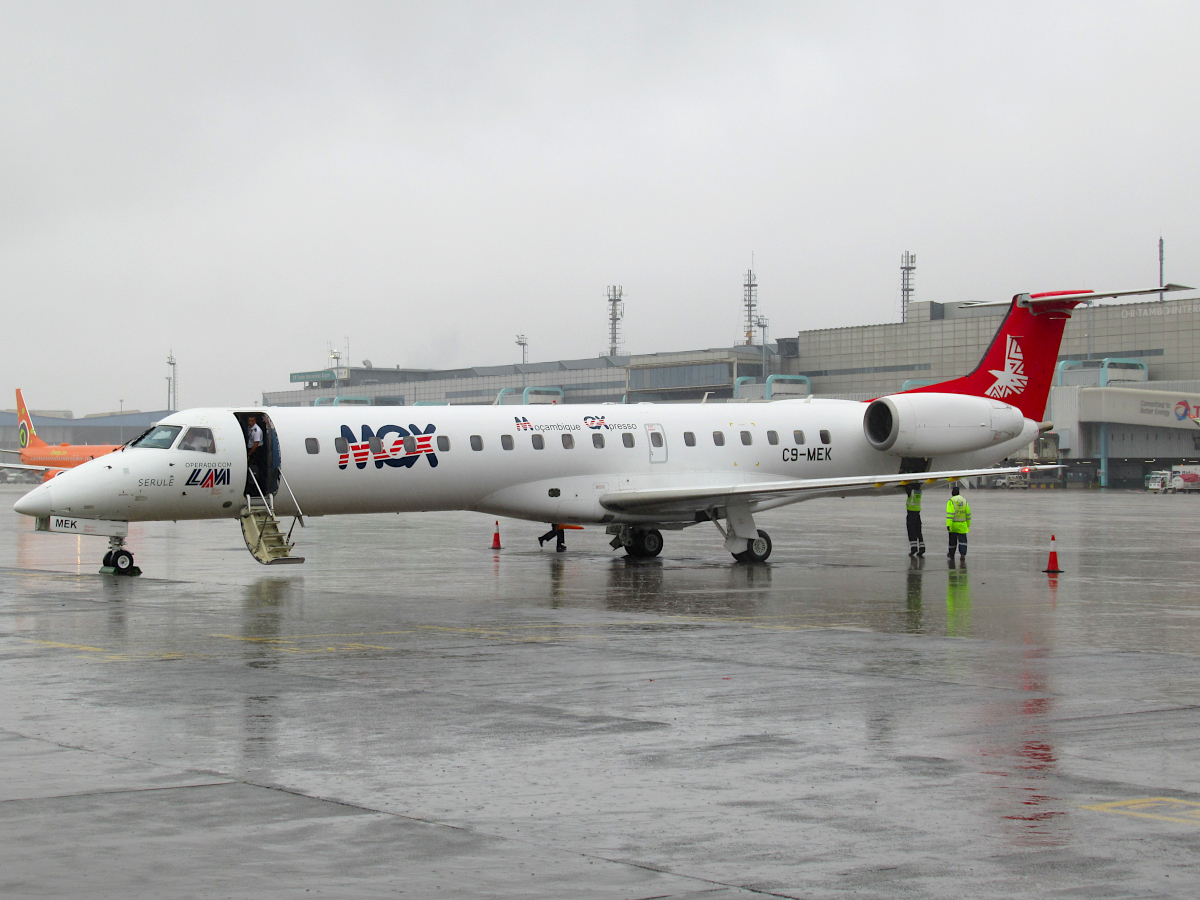
A Mocambique Expresso Embraer 145 at O R Tambo International Airport

=== Current fleet ===
As of August 2025, Moçambique Expresso operates the following aircraft:

Moçambique Expresso fleet
Aircraft	In fleet	Passengers	Notes
Embraer ERJ 145MP	3	50	
Total	3		

=== Former fleet ===
The airline fleet previously included the following aircraft:

- 1 Bombardier CRJ200
- 1De Havilland Canada Dash 8 Q400
- 2 British Aerospace Jetstream 41
- 2 CASA C.212- Aviocar
- 2 Embraer EMB 120RT Brasilia
