= Beira Airport =

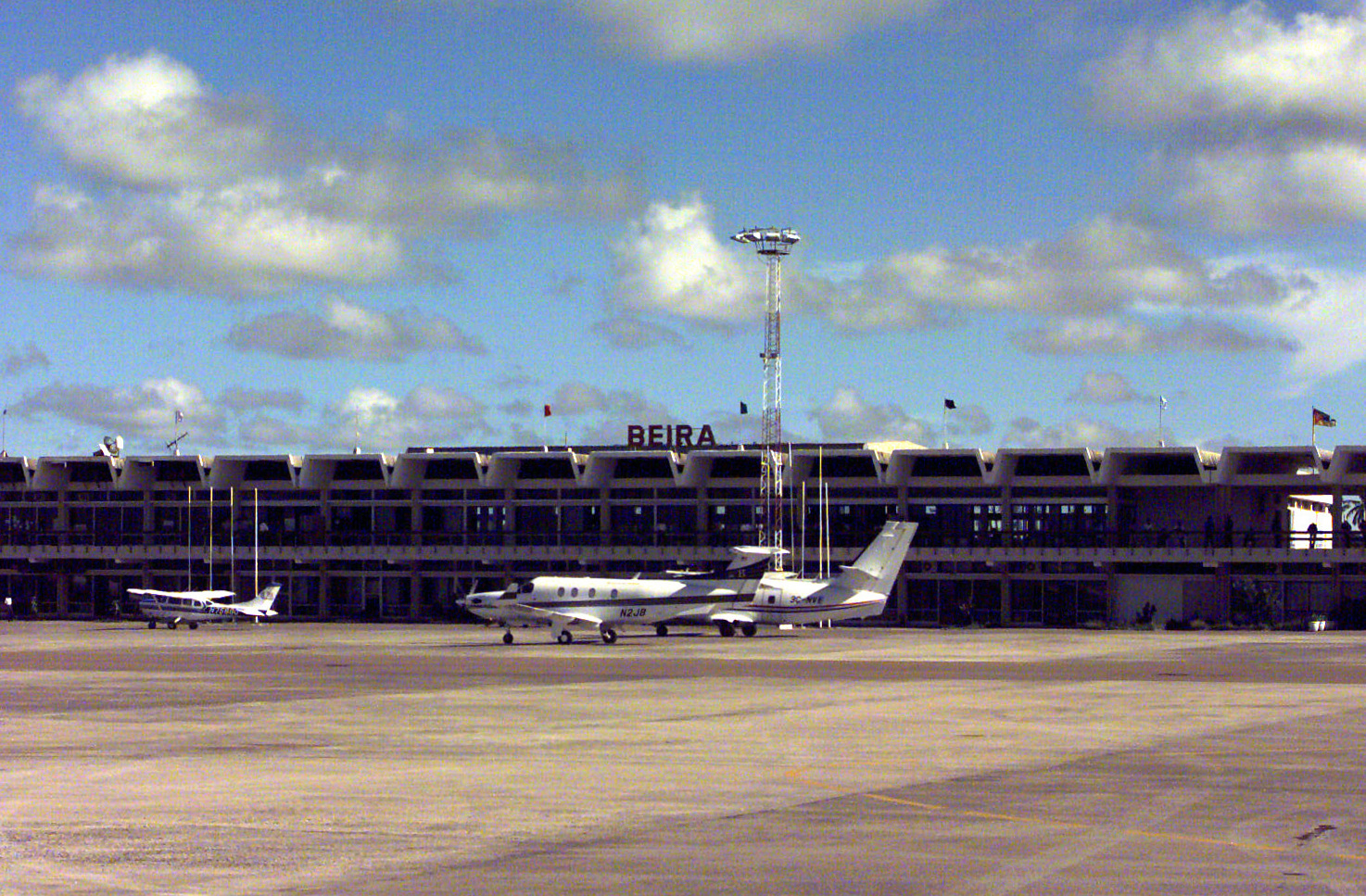
- IATA: BEW; ICAO: FQBR

Summary
- Airport type: Public
- Operator: Aeroportos de Mocambique (Mozambique Airports Company)
- Serves: Beira
- Location: Beira, Mozambique
- Elevation AMSL: 33 ft (10 m)
- Coordinates: 19°47′47″S 034°54′27″E

Map
- Location within Mozambique

Runways
Direction	Length		Surface
Direction	ft	m	Surface
12/30	7,874	2,362	Asphalt
17/35	5,660	1,698	Asphalt
06/24	3,018	920	Asphalt
- Source: WFP WAD

Beira Airport is an airport in Beira, Mozambique (IATA: BEW, ICAO: FQBR). It has 3 asphalt runways.

== Airlines and destinations ==
Airlines	Destinations
Airlink	Johannesburg–O.R. Tambo
Ethiopian Airlines	Addis Ababa
LAM Mozambique Airlines	Chimoio, Johannesburg–O.R. Tambo, Maputo, Nampula, Pemba, Tete
Moçambique Expresso	Maputo
