= Lichinga Airport =

Airport in Mozambique

- IATA: VXC; ICAO: FQLC

Summary
- Airport type: Public
- Serves: Niassa Province, Lichinga
- Time zone: MZT (+2:00)
- Elevation AMSL: 4,491 ft / 1,369 m
- Coordinates: 13°16′26″S 35°15′59″E

Map

Runways
| Direction | Length | | Surface |
| Direction | ft | m | Surface |
|---|---|---|---|
| 08/26 | 8,300 | 2,530 | Asphalt |

Lichinga Airport (IATA: VXC, ICAO: FQLC) is an airport in Lichinga, Mozambique that is served by Linhas Aéreas de Moçambique the national flag carrier.

== Airlines and destinations ==
| Airlines | Destinations |
|---|---|
| LAM Mozambique Airlines | Maputo, Nampula, Quelimane |

== Accidents and incidents ==
- On 8 January 1974, Douglas VC-47B 6161 of the Força Aérea Portuguesa crashed at Vila Cabral Airport and was damaged beyond economic repair. The aircraft was on a military flight from Mueda Airport and it is reported that it was hit by small arms fire on approach to Vila Cabral.
