= Nampula Airport =

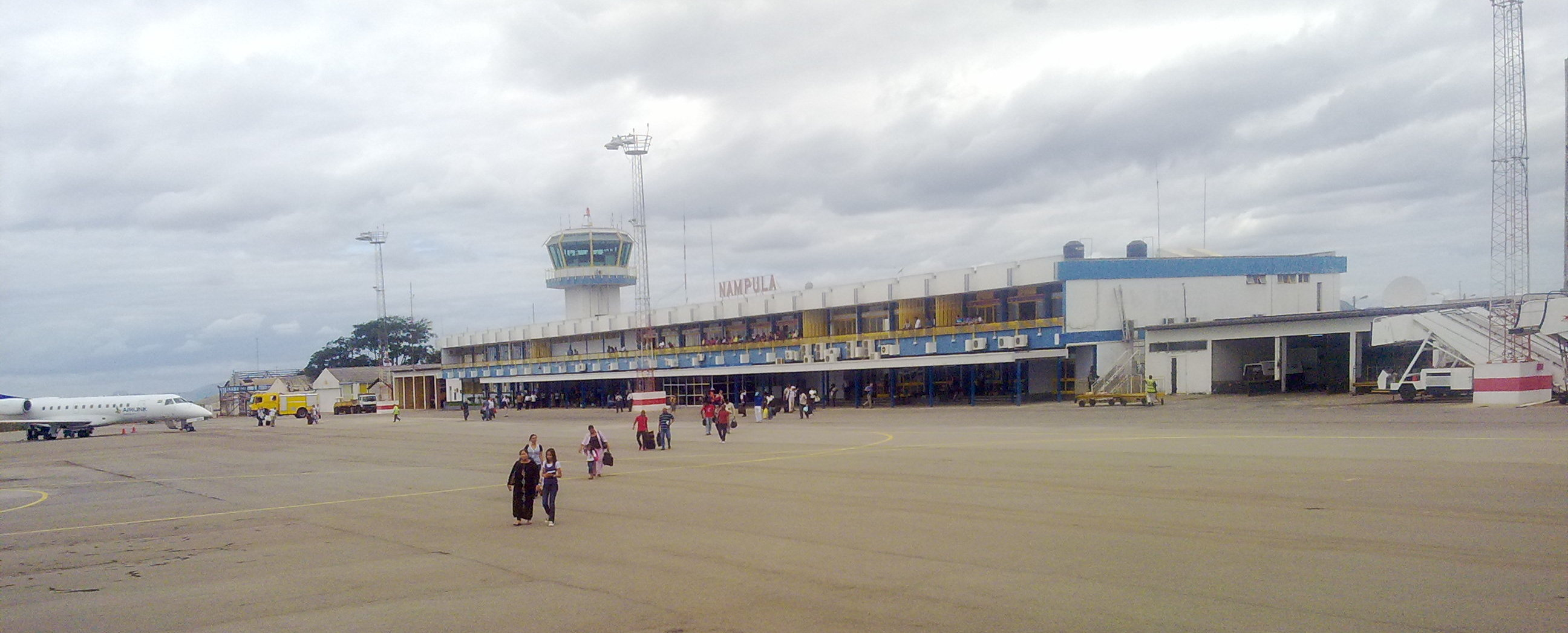
- IATA: APL; ICAO: FQNP

Summary
- Airport type: Public
- Operator: Aeroportos de Mocambique (Mozambique Airports Company)
- Serves: Nampula
- Location: Nampula, Mozambique
- Hub for: Kaya Airlines
- Elevation AMSL: 1,444 ft (440 m)
- Coordinates: 15°06′20.20″S 39°16′54.48″E

Map
- Location of airport in Mozambique

Runways
Direction	Length		Surface
Direction	ft	m	Surface
05/23	6,562	2,000	Asphalt
13/31	5,135	1,565	Gravel

Nampula Airport is an international airport in Nampula, Mozambique (IATA: APL, ICAO: FQNP). In the northeastern part of Mozambique, with two paved runways.

== Airlines and destinations ==
Airlines	Destinations
Airlink	Johannesburg–O. R. Tambo
Kenya Airways	Nairobi–Jomo Kenyatta
LAM Mozambique Airlines	Beira, Johannesburg–O. R. Tambo, Lichinga, Maputo, Tete
