= Maputo International Airport =

- Airport entrance pictured in 2008
- IATA: MPM; ICAO: FQMA

Summary
- Airport type: Public
- Operator: Aeroportos de Moçambique (Mozambique Airports Company)
- Serves: Maputo
- Location: Maputo, Mozambique
- Hub for: LAM Mozambique Airlines; Moçambique Expresso
- Elevation AMSL: 145 ft (44 m)
- Coordinates: 25°55′15″S 032°34′21″E

Map
- Location within Mozambique

Runways
Direction	Length		Surface
Direction	m	ft	Surface
05/23	3,660	12,008	Asphalt
10/28	1,700	5,577	Asphalt

Statistics (2023)
- Passengers: 1 051 868

International terminal waiting area, 2018

Maputo International Airport (IATA: MPM, ICAO: FQMA), also known as Mavalane International Airport, formerly Lourenço Marques Airport (IATA: LUM), is an airport located 3 kilometres (1.9 mi) northwest of the center of Maputo, the largest city and capital of Mozambique. It is the largest airport in Mozambique, and hub for LAM Mozambique Airlines. Most of the destinations served by the airport are in Africa, but there are a few intercontinental services.

== History ==
=== As Lourenço Marques Airport ===
Named after Portuguese explorer Lourenço Marques, during the Mozambican War of Independence while under the control of the Portuguese colonial government it was the target of many attacks from FRELIMO. It was alleged that in one of these attacks, it birth the creation of the Mozambique drill used in standard firearms training.

== Expansion ==
China's Anhui Foreign Economic Construction Company has built a new cargo terminal, in what was the starting point of the first phase of a Chinese financed expansion project, with an initial estimated cost of US$75 million. The first phase concluded with the opening of the new international terminal on 15 November 2010. The new terminal has a capacity of 900,000 passengers a year, far from the 60,000 it could hold before. Originally, this modernization project had in mind to benefit from the 2010 FIFA World Cup held in neighbouring South Africa, but it could not be finished in time. It was, however, ready for the All Africa Games which were held in Maputo in 2011. The project experienced a serious cost overrun, with the builder requesting an additional US$40 to US$50 million to complete the work.

The second phase entailed the construction of a new domestic terminal where the old terminal stood. The whole plan is for Maputo International Airport to double its capacity from 450,000 to 900,000 per year and help expand tourism in the city and country. The terminal will also have 14 check-in counters, electronic panels displaying flights, a presidential VIP lounge, escalators and an electric central cooling system. The new terminal is expected to serve 400 arriving and departing passengers per hour, compared to the old building that could only handle 150 passengers per hour.

== Airlines and destinations ==
=== Passenger ===
Airlines	Destinations	Refs
Airlink	Cape Town, Johannesburg–O. R. Tambo	
Ethiopian Airlines	Addis Ababa	
FlySafair	Johannesburg–O. R. Tambo	
Kenya Airways	Nairobi–Jomo Kenyatta	
LAM Mozambique Airlines	Beira, Cape Town, Chimoio, Dar es Salaam, Inhambane, Johannesburg–O. R. Tambo, Lichinga, Nacala, Nairobi–Jomo Kenyatta, Nampula, Pemba, Quelimane, Tete, Vilanculos, Xai-Xai	
Moçambique Expresso	Beira, Tete	
Qatar Airways	Doha	
TAAG Angola Airlines	Luanda–Agostinho Neto	
TAP Air Portugal	Lisbon	
Turkish Airlines	Istanbul^{a}	

Notes

- ^{a}: This flight operates via Johannesburg. However, this carrier does not have rights to transport passengers solely between Johannesburg and Maputo.

=== Cargo ===
Airlines	Destinations
Astral Aviation	Johannesburg–O. R. Tambo, Nairobi–Jomo Kenyatta
Westair Aviation	Windhoek–Eros

== Accidents and incidents ==
- On 10 July 1986, Douglas C-47A 7315 of the Zimbabwe Air Force crashed on take-off. All 17 people on board were killed.
