= Nampula =

- City
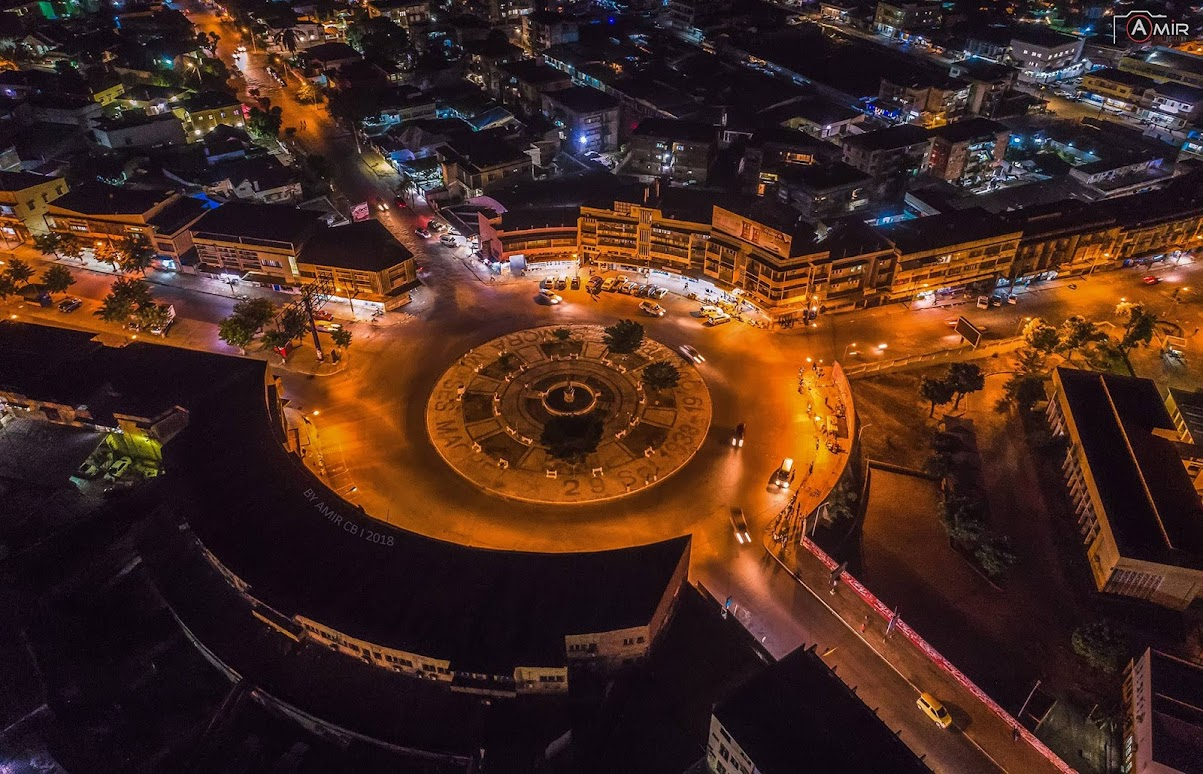
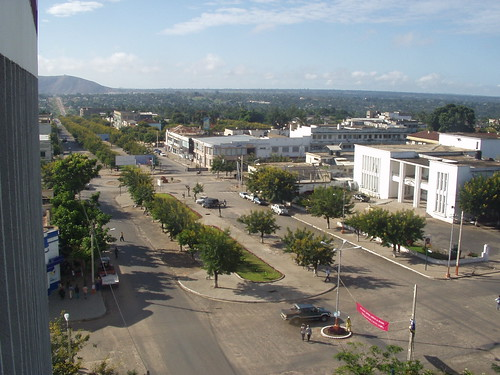
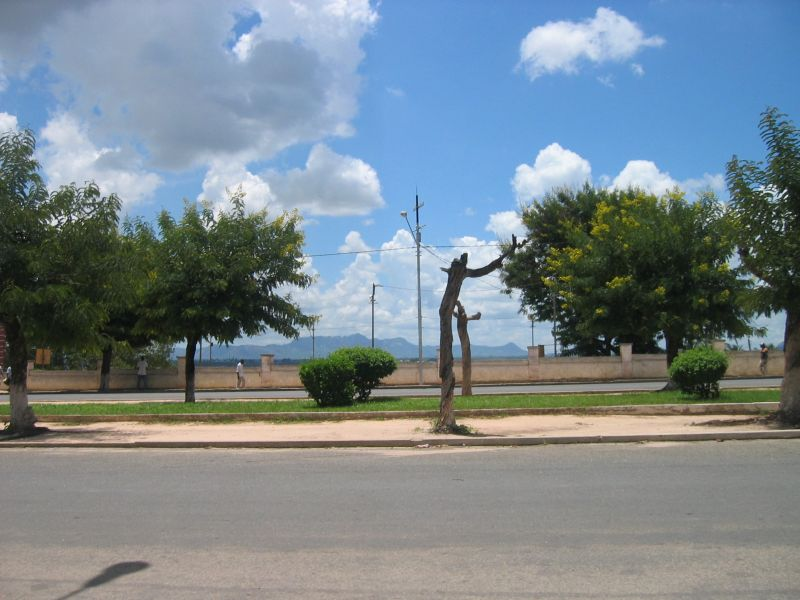
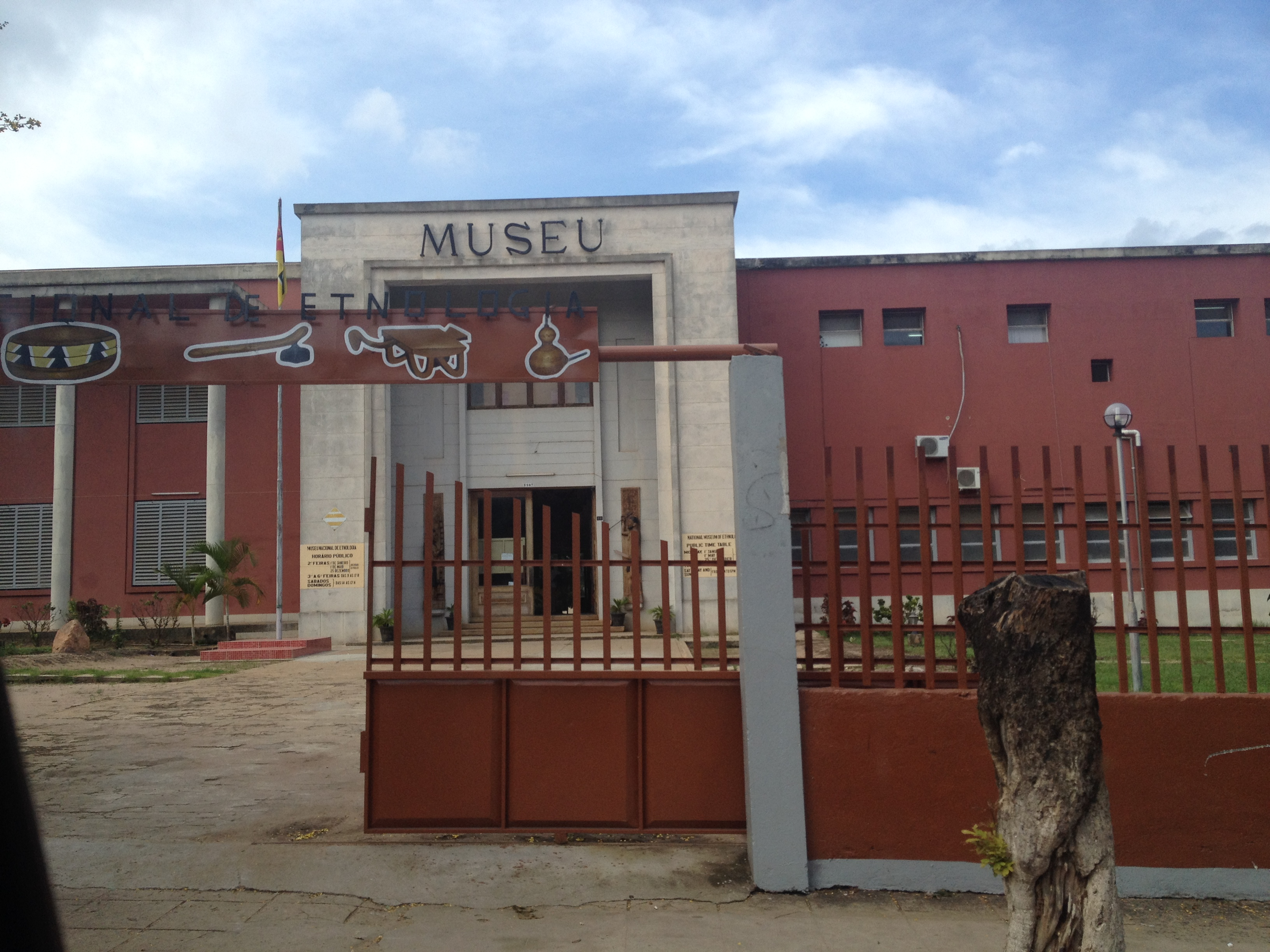
- From top, left to right: Samora Machel Roundabout, Municipal Council Building, View from Avenida 25 de Setembro, Mozambican National Ethnographic Museum, Our Lady of Fatima Cathedral

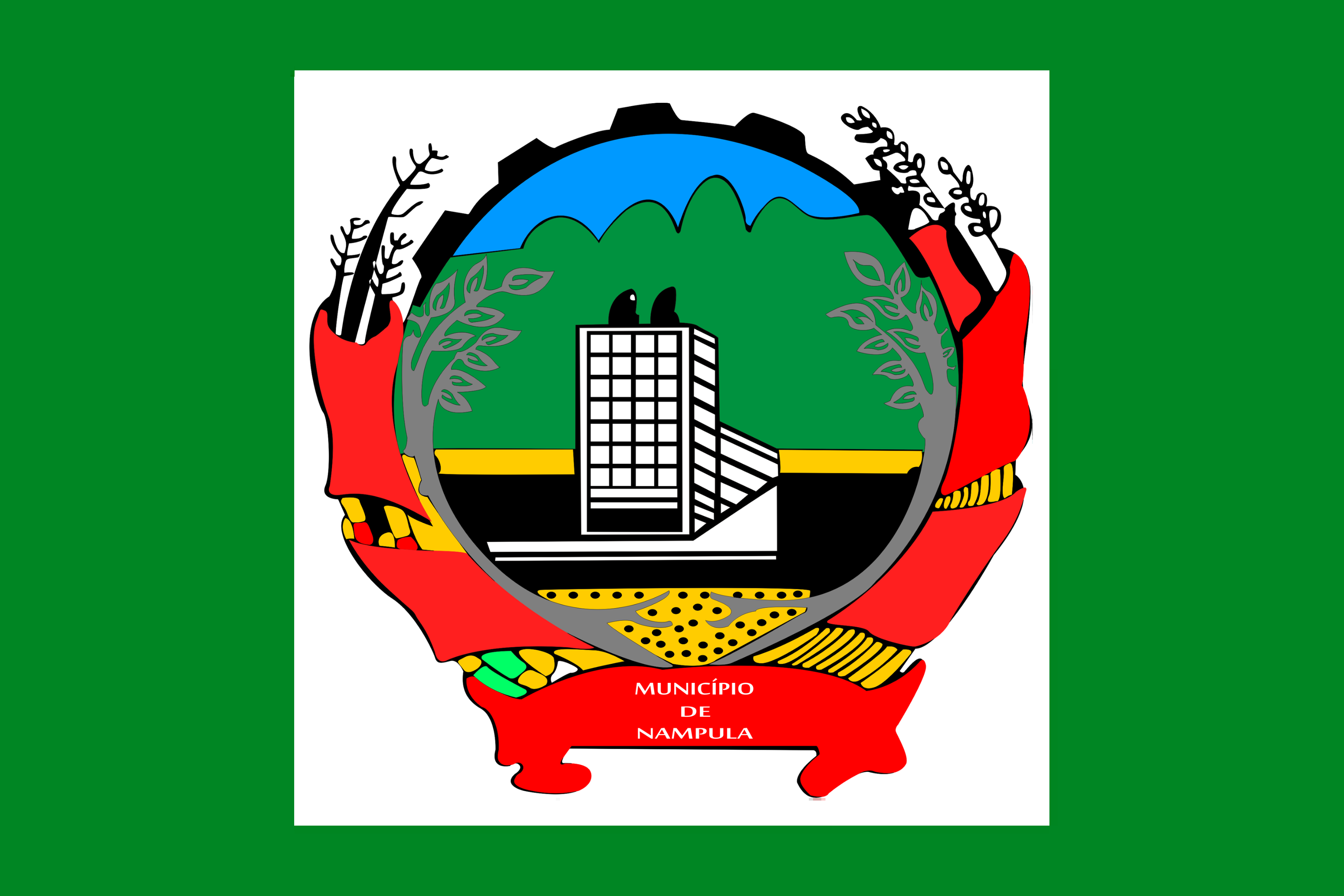
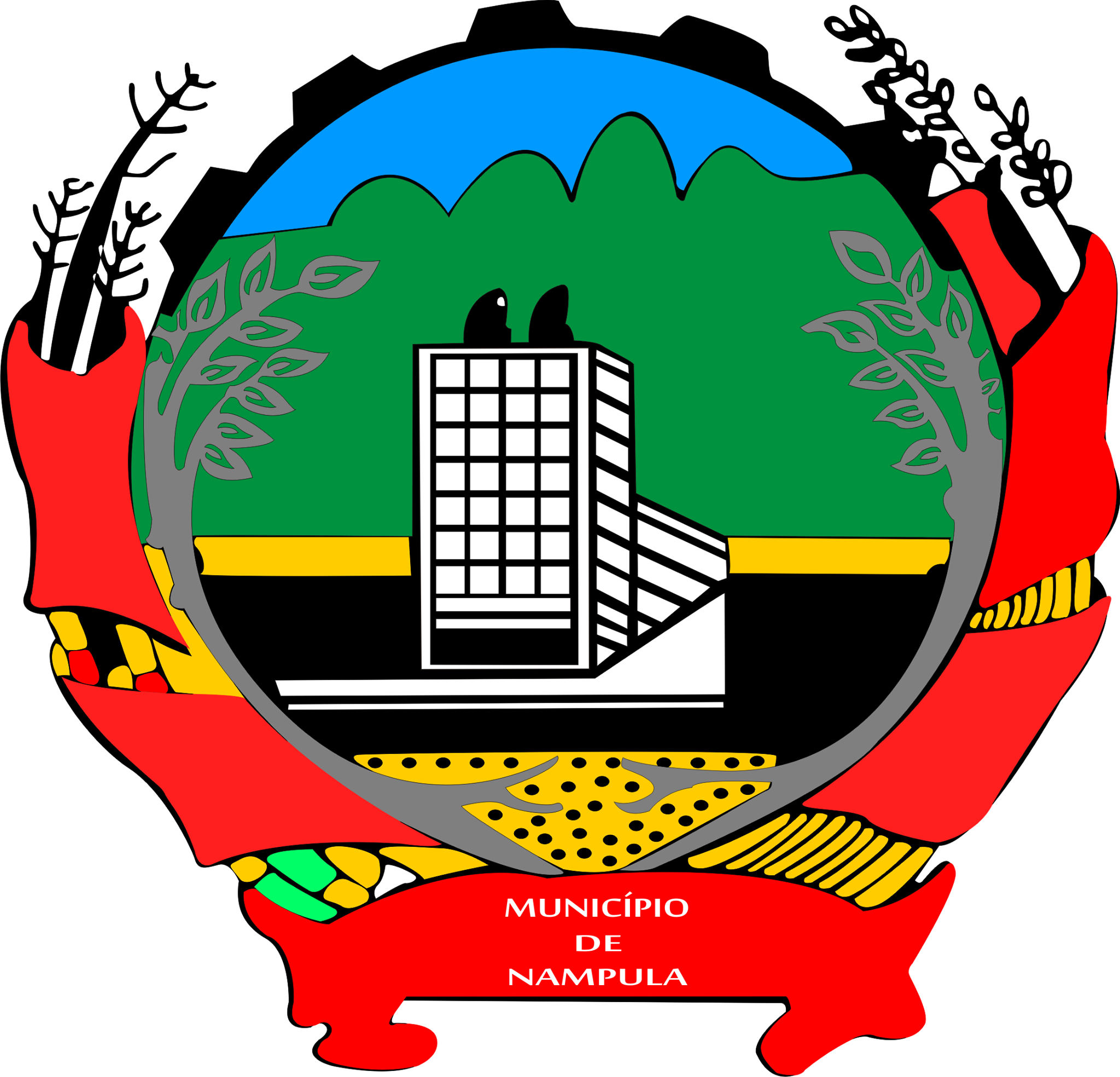
- Flag Seal
- Nickname: A Capital Do Norte
- Interactive map of Nampula
- Location within Mozambique Location within Africa
- Coordinates: 15°07′S 39°16′E
- Country: Mozambique
- Provinces: Nampula
- District: Nampula
- City Status: 1956
- Named for: Whampula or M'Phula

Government
  - Type: Municipal Council
  - Body: Conselho Municipal de Nampula
  - Mayor: Paulo Vahanle (RENAMO)

Area
  - Total: 330 km^{2} (130 sq mi)
- Elevation: 360 m (1,180 ft)

Population (2017 census)
  - Total: 743,125
  - Rank: 3rd
  - Density: 2,300/km^{2} (5,800/sq mi)
- Demonym: Nampulense
- Time zone: UTC+2 (CAT)
- Postal Code: 3100
- Area code: (+258) 26
- Climate: Aw
- Website: https://cmnampula.gov.mz/

Nampula [nɐ̃ˈpulɐ] is the capital city of Nampula Province in Northern Mozambique. With a population of 743,125 (2017 census), it is the third-largest city in Mozambique after Maputo and Matola. The city is located in the interior of Nampula Province, approximately 200 kilometers from the coast and is surrounded by plains and rocky outcrops. The city is a major regional centre for the entire Northern region of Mozambique, as well as parts of Central Mozambique and border areas of Malawi and Tanzania.

The city links the port city of Nacala with land-locked Southern African countries, particularly Malawi through a road and railway line. The city has a small international airport connecting to Nairobi in Kenya, Johannesburg in South Africa, Dar-es-Salaam in Tanzania and is a hub for local transport in northern Mozambique. Nampula is the centre of business in Northern Mozambique, benefitting from highly productive agricultural areas, proximity to the Nacala Development Corridor, and a fast-growing city population.

Nampula is home to the Mozambican National Ethnographic Museum, several markets, cathedrals, mosques, universities, training institutes and schools. The city is diverse, with the native eMakhuwa population being the largest group but with a visible Indian, European (dominantly Portuguese), Chinese, Lebanese, Somali, and Nigerian population.

== Etymology ==
The name "Nampula" is said to be derived from the eMakhuwa word "Whampula", which according to local legend refers to a tribal leader of the area in the past.

== History ==
Nampula is a relatively new city. It was founded by the Portuguese colonial army in 1907 and elevated to city status in 1956. During the Mozambican War of Independence, Nampula was a strategic military centre for the colonial army in the fight against the FRELIMO liberation movement.

After independence in 1975, the Portuguese abandoned Nampula and rural populations migrated to the city, squatting in unplanned areas on the city outskirts. This migratory movement dramatically increased during the Mozambican Civil War, affecting Nampula in the decade between 1982 and 1992. When the war ended the Mozambican Government expected the refugees to return to the countryside, but they remained in the city. After a few years of migratory slow‐down, the growth of the city resumed, as the rapid economic development of Mozambique materialized mostly in the urban areas. Nampula, in the post‐war period, developed into a major Mozambican growth centre, attracting an increasing number of public and private investments in a wide range of economic and social areas.

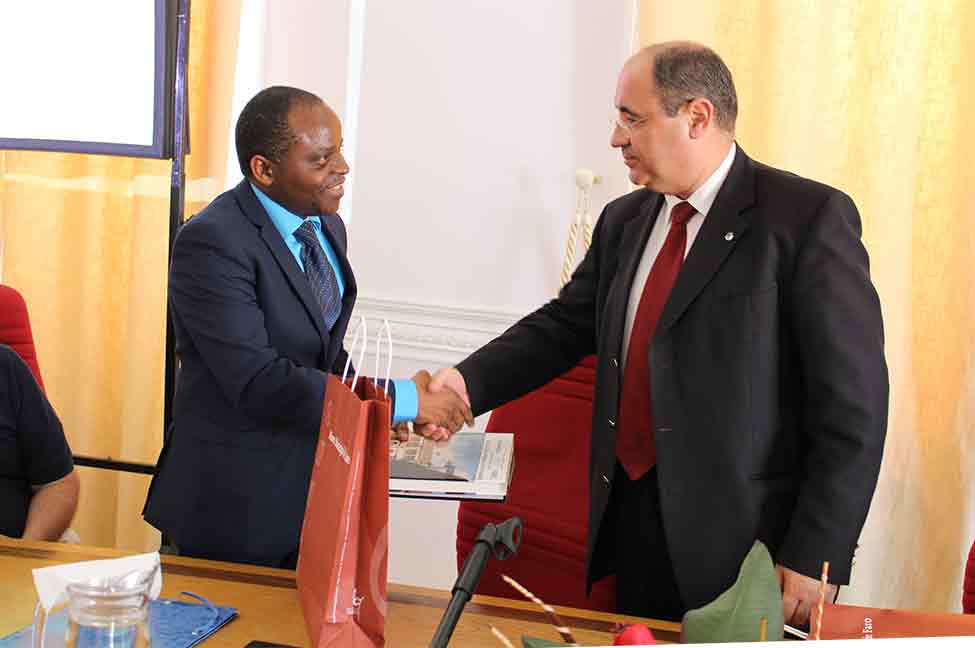
Mahamudo Amurane (left) was the Mayor of Nampula from 2014 to 2017.

In colonial times there was a Nampula Town Hall with a very limited mandate which was dissolved in 1979. The Municipal Council of Nampula was created in 1998, alongside those of other major Mozambican cities. FRELIMO won the first local elections that year, and in the subsequent elections in 2003, 2008, and 2011. An opposition party, the Democratic Movement of Mozambique (MDM), won the 2013 municipal elections, led by Mahamudo Amurane. Mayor Amurane was assassinated in October 2017, and investigations into his death proved to be inconclusive. Amurane's death led to a collapse of the MDM's support base in Nampula and another opposition party, RENAMO, won subsequent municipal elections led by Paulo Vahanle.

Since the establishment of the city, Nampula has had numerous mayors:

- Aurélio das Neves
- Germano José Joaquim
- Francisco Joaquim de Lima
- Narciso João Iondela
- Ishaca Abdul Ali Baraca
- Dionísio Cherewa
- Castro Namuaca
- Mahamudo Amurane
- Paulo Vahanle

== Administration ==
Nampula is divided into seven administrative zones, which are also subdivided into localities, as follows: Urbano Central, Anchilo, Muatala, Muhala, Namikopo, Napipine, and Natikiri.

== Population ==
=== Demographics ===
Year (census)	Population
1997	303,346
2007	471,717
2017	743,125

=== Religion ===
Nampula's dominant religions are Christianity and Islam. A small community of Hindus are also present in the city. Its Cathedral of Our Lady of Fatima is the archiepiscopal see of the Roman Catholic Diocese of Nampula.

== Education ==
The city is home to the Faculty of Health Science, Universidade Lurio. In 2009 a course in optometry was launched, the first of its kind in Mozambique. The course was supported through the Mozambique Eyecare Project. The other partners include the Dublin Institute of Technology, University of Ulster and Brien Holden Vision Institute. As of 2019, 61 Mozambican students have graduated with optometry degrees from Universidade Lurio (34 male and 27 female). The optometry course is now fully embedded within Universidade Lurio's systems and continues to recruit new students every year. Importantly, optometry is now registered as a profession in Mozambique and is recognized through membership of the African Council of Optometry (AFCO). Of the graduates, 26 are now working in public hospitals. In addition, 10 have university teaching posts (five male and five female). Seven of the graduates have enrolled on postgraduate programmes (five male and seven female).

There is a Portuguese international school, Escola Lusófona de Nampula, as well as four international English schools, with the oldest being Stella Maris International School.

== Transport ==
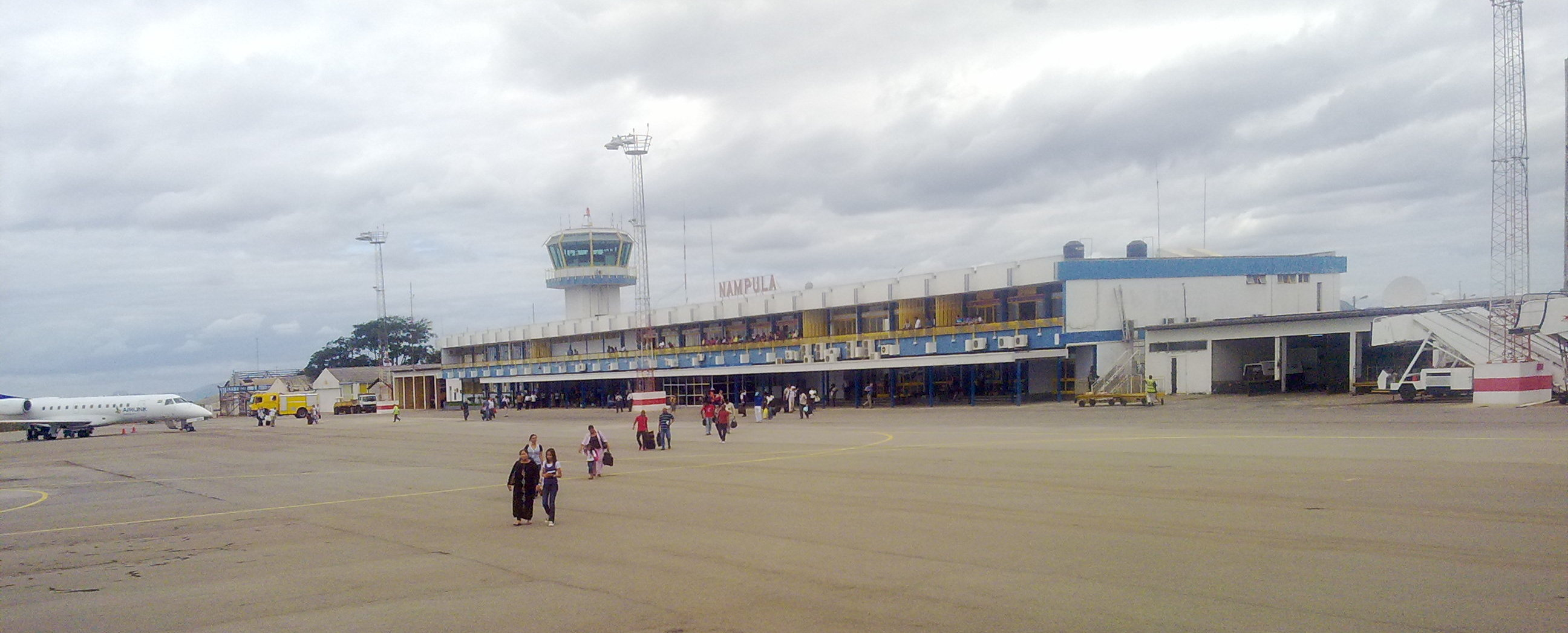
Nampula International Airport

- The city has an airport, Nampula International Airport, which is located 4 kilometres away from the city centre. Kenya Airways currently operates thrice-a-week flights from Nairobi, while Airlink connects to Johannesburg in South Africa. LAM connects to domestic places like Pemba, Lichinga, Tete, Beira, Vilankulo, Quelimane and Maputo.
- The Nacala railway serves the city. Additionally, a railway workshop is located in the city.
- The bus stand, which can be accessed from any part of the city within 10 minutes, connects with places within Nampula province and in the neighbouring provinces. The tourist location Ilha de Moçambique, is located 200 km east of Nampula and is accessible by numerous minibuses.

== Geography ==
The city of Nampula lies in the centre of the province of Nampula and is surrounded by plains and rocky outcrops. The city lies amongst rolling hills and mountains, typical of the interior of northern Mozambique.

=== Climate ===
Nampula has a tropical savanna climate (Köppen climate classification: Aw).

Climate data for Nampula (Nampula Airport), elevation 441 m (1,447 ft), (1991–2020 normals, extremes 2005–2023)
Month	Jan	Feb	Mar	Apr	May	Jun	Jul	Aug	Sep	Oct	Nov	Dec	Year
Record high °C (°F)	36.1 (97.0)	34.6 (94.3)	34.4 (93.9)	33.9 (93.0)	33.4 (92.1)	32.1 (89.8)	31.7 (89.1)	33.6 (92.5)	36.1 (97.0)	38.3 (100.9)	39.2 (102.6)	38.8 (101.8)	39.2 (102.6)
Mean daily maximum °C (°F)	31.2 (88.2)	31.2 (88.2)	30.4 (86.7)	29.1 (84.4)	28.5 (83.3)	26.9 (80.4)	26.3 (79.3)	28.8 (83.8)	31.4 (88.5)	33.2 (91.8)	32.7 (90.9)	33.0 (91.4)	30.2 (86.4)
Daily mean °C (°F)	25.9 (78.6)	25.7 (78.3)	25.3 (77.5)	24.1 (75.4)	22.9 (73.2)	21.2 (70.2)	20.8 (69.4)	22.0 (71.6)	24.0 (75.2)	25.7 (78.3)	26.7 (80.1)	26.8 (80.2)	24.3 (75.7)
Mean daily minimum °C (°F)	22.5 (72.5)	22.5 (72.5)	21.9 (71.4)	20.4 (68.7)	18.9 (66.0)	17.3 (63.1)	16.6 (61.9)	17.2 (63.0)	18.4 (65.1)	19.8 (67.6)	21.8 (71.2)	22.4 (72.3)	20.0 (67.9)
Record low °C (°F)	19.7 (67.5)	19.8 (67.6)	18.2 (64.8)	15.0 (59.0)	15.0 (59.0)	13.3 (55.9)	11.2 (52.2)	12.5 (54.5)	13.4 (56.1)	15.1 (59.2)	16.0 (60.8)	17.2 (63.0)	11.2 (52.2)
Average precipitation mm (inches)	227.6 (8.96)	216.4 (8.52)	181.1 (7.13)	81.1 (3.19)	23.2 (0.91)	15.5 (0.61)	22.1 (0.87)	8.1 (0.32)	5.6 (0.22)	24.2 (0.95)	82.9 (3.26)	183.8 (7.24)	1,071.6 (42.19)
Average precipitation days	14.7	13.2	13.3	8.1	4.0	3.4	3.8	1.7	1.3	2.3	5.7	11.1	82.6
Source 1: World Meteorological Organization (precipitation 1961–1990)
Source 2: Starlings Roost Weather

== Notable locals ==
Abel Xavier, a Portuguese football player, Carlos Queiroz, a Portuguese football manager formerly in charge of Real Madrid, and football manager, Paulo Fonseca were also from Nampula, at that time a city of the Portuguese Overseas Province of Mozambique.

Nazira Abdula, pediatrician and Mozambican Minister of Health, was born in Nampula.

Rui Águas, Portuguese racing driver, was born in Nampula.
