= Nacala Airport =

- IATA: MNC; ICAO: FQNC

Summary
- Airport type: Commercial
- Serves: Nacala, Mozambique
- Elevation AMSL: 398 ft (121 m)
- Coordinates: 14°29′17″S 040°42′44″E

Map
- Location of airport in Mozambique

Runways
| Direction | Length | | Surface |
| Direction | m | ft | Surface |
|---|---|---|---|
| 01/19 | 3,100 | 10,170 | Asphalt |

Nacala Airport (IATA: MNC, ICAO: FQNC) is an airport near Nacala, in Nampula Province in Mozambique. Formerly a military airport, it underwent a major redevelopment to convert it to commercial use.

The redeveloped airport opened in 2014, but for the last three years has stood almost unused, operating at 4% capacity with only LAM Mozambique Airlines flying there twice a week from Maputo.

== Development ==
The airport was constructed by the Brazilian multi-national engineering and construction firm Odebrecht International, part of the Odebrecht conglomerate of companies, as part of rehabilitating the Nacala airport for commercial aviation use. As a cargo and passenger handling station the work was budgeted at USD 80 million. An agreement between the Mozambican and Brazilian governments was signed in April 2011 to provide funding for the airport rehabilitation as well as significant upgrades to infrastructure at the Beira Port. Both projects were funded by the Brazilian Development Bank, as part of a US$300 million investment in Mozambique by Brazil.

The project consisted of the construction of passenger and cargo terminals, a control tower, maintenance building, firefighting building, runway, taxi ways, a parking lot and all necessary equipment and systems. It involved 23 months of construction work, with completion scheduled for March 2013. The final construction bill was thought to be between 125 and 200 million USD. The airport was designed to serve 500,000 people per year, receive 5,000 tons of cargo per year, making it the second-busiest in the country. Nacala's airport was inaugurated by Mozambique President Armando Guebuza in December 2014.

== Scandal ==
Three years after opening it has been noted that the airport operates only at 4% capacity, serving only 20,000 passengers rather than the projected 500,000. Odebrecht, the company building the airport, admitted to bribing officials.

== Facilities ==
The airport is at an elevation of 410 feet (125 m) above mean sea level. It has one runway designated 01/19 with an asphalt surface measuring 3,100 by 45 metres (10,171 ft × 148 ft).

== Airlines and destinations ==
| Airlines | Destinations |
|---|---|
| Airlink | Johannesburg–O.R. Tambo |
| LAM Mozambique Airlines | Maputo |
