= Lichinga =

Capital of Niassa Province, Mozambique

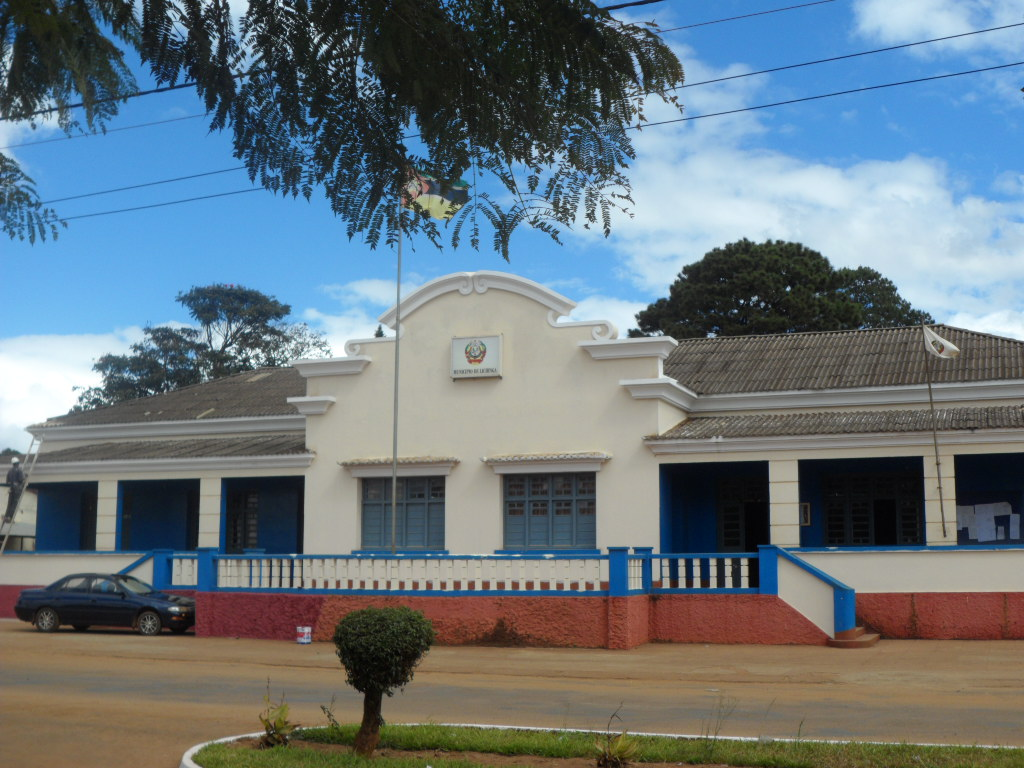
- Municipal Council of Lichinga

- Location within Mozambique
- Coordinates: 13°18′46″S 35°14′26″E
- Country: Mozambique
- Provinces: Niassa Province

Area
  - Total: 280 km^{2} (110 sq mi)
- Elevation: 1,398 m (4,587 ft)

Population (2017 census)
  - Total: 213,361
  - Density: 760/km^{2} (2,000/sq mi)
- Time zone: UTC+2 (CAT)
- Climate: Cwb

Lichinga is the capital city of Niassa Province of Mozambique. It lies on the Lichinga Plateau at an altitude of 1,360 metres (4,460 ft), east of Lake Niassa (Lake Malawi). The town was founded as Vila Cabral as a farming and military settlement. It is served by Lichinga Airport. The province borders Ruvuma Region in Tanzania.

== History ==
=== Early history ===
The region that is Niassa province is the ancestral homeland of the Yao and Makua.

=== Portuguese rule ===
Founded by the Portuguese colonial administration in 1931 as Vila Cabral, the town was designed to become a fast growth urban centre, its streets and avenues paying attention to a projected future growth. Vila Cabral was upgraded to city status in 1962. In the early 1960s its population was 27,000 inhabitants; by 1970 it had 36,715. The city developed as an agriculture and colonial service centre until the independence of Mozambique from Portugal in 1975. In addition, the town's economy included forestry-based activities and was surrounded by a pine tree plantation.

=== After independence from Portugal ===
After independence the new government renamed the city Lichinga. The effects of 17 years of civil war (1975-1992) spread famine and disease in Mozambique resulting in many deaths and refugees in the region around Lichinga.

== Climate ==
Owing to its high altitude location the town experiences a moderate subtropical highland climate (Cwb, according to the Köppen climate classification), with cool weather in the dry season (May to September) and average temperatures of 15.5 °C (59.9 °F) in July. Summertime is October to April with the hottest weather in November: average temperature 22 °C (72 °F). This is also the season of heavy rain especially December to March. The annual rainfall is 1,171 mm (46.1 in).

Climate data for Lichinga, elevation 1,365 m (4,478 ft), (1991–2020 normals, extremes 1951–present)
Month	Jan	Feb	Mar	Apr	May	Jun	Jul	Aug	Sep	Oct	Nov	Dec	Year
Record high °C (°F)	31.0 (87.8)	30.2 (86.4)	29.8 (85.6)	30.3 (86.5)	32.4 (90.3)	27.6 (81.7)	29.0 (84.2)	29.8 (85.6)	31.0 (87.8)	36.4 (97.5)	35.0 (95.0)	32.3 (90.1)	36.4 (97.5)
Mean daily maximum °C (°F)	25.3 (77.5)	25.0 (77.0)	25.4 (77.7)	24.2 (75.6)	23.4 (74.1)	21.7 (71.1)	20.8 (69.4)	23.2 (73.8)	26.6 (79.9)	27.1 (80.8)	28.6 (83.5)	26.0 (78.8)	24.8 (76.6)
Daily mean °C (°F)	20.3 (68.5)	20.4 (68.7)	20.0 (68.0)	19.0 (66.2)	17.7 (63.9)	15.7 (60.3)	15.5 (59.9)	17.1 (62.8)	19.4 (66.9)	21.5 (70.7)	21.9 (71.4)	20.7 (69.3)	18.4 (65.1)
Mean daily minimum °C (°F)	17.0 (62.6)	16.6 (61.9)	16.1 (61.0)	14.8 (58.6)	12.8 (55.0)	11.0 (51.8)	11.2 (52.2)	11.4 (52.5)	12.9 (55.2)	15.7 (60.3)	16.6 (61.9)	17.4 (63.3)	14.5 (58.0)
Record low °C (°F)	10.4 (50.7)	11.0 (51.8)	9.0 (48.2)	6.0 (42.8)	1.9 (35.4)	2.7 (36.9)	1.0 (33.8)	1.8 (35.2)	6.6 (43.9)	8.5 (47.3)	8.9 (48.0)	10.5 (50.9)	1.0 (33.8)
Average precipitation mm (inches)	222.5 (8.76)	224.1 (8.82)	201.2 (7.92)	91.9 (3.62)	24.6 (0.97)	2.8 (0.11)	3.6 (0.14)	1.0 (0.04)	3.4 (0.13)	19.4 (0.76)	103.0 (4.06)	234.6 (9.24)	1,132.1 (44.57)
Average precipitation days (≥ 1.0 mm)	19.4	16.9	17.8	9.8	2.8	0.7	0.9	0.2	0.6	2.6	9.1	17.8	98.6
Average relative humidity (%)	87	86	85	82	76	73	67	63	57	52	65	82	73
Mean monthly sunshine hours	130.2	130.0	161.2	183.0	232.5	222.0	213.9	241.8	246.0	279.0	201.0	139.5	2,380.1
Percentage possible sunshine	33	37	43	52	66	66	61	67	69	73	53	35	54
Source 1: Deutscher Wetterdienst (precipitation, humidity and sun 1961–1990) Starlings Roost Weather
Source 2: NOAA (extremes)

== Demographics ==
There are a minimum estimated 450,000 Yao people living in Mozambique. They largely occupy the eastern and northern part of the Niassa province and form about 40% of the population of Lichinga.

Year	Population
1997 census	85,758
2007 census	142,331
2017 census	213,361

== Transport ==
A railway branch line from the port of Nacala terminates in this town, it has been renovated and receives services 3 times per week. Transport into and out of the city is either by private car or the public chapa, or minibus system. Air service is provided by Lichinga Airport with flights to Nampula and Maputo through LAM Mozambique Airlines or Ethiopian Airlines.

== Notable people ==
- Venâncio Mondlane (born 1974), politician
