= Mueda Airport =

- IATA: MUD; ICAO: FQMD

Summary
- Airport type: Public
- Serves: Mueda
- Elevation AMSL: 2,789 ft / 850 m
- Coordinates: 11°40′22″S 39°33′47″E

Map
- Location of the airport in Mozambique

Runways
Direction	Length		Surface
Direction	ft	m	Surface
16/34	7,690	2,344	Paved

Mueda Airport (IATA: MUD, ICAO: FQMD) is an airport serving Mueda, Cabo Delgado Province, Mozambique.

== See also ==
- Transport in Mozambique
