= Chingozi Airport =

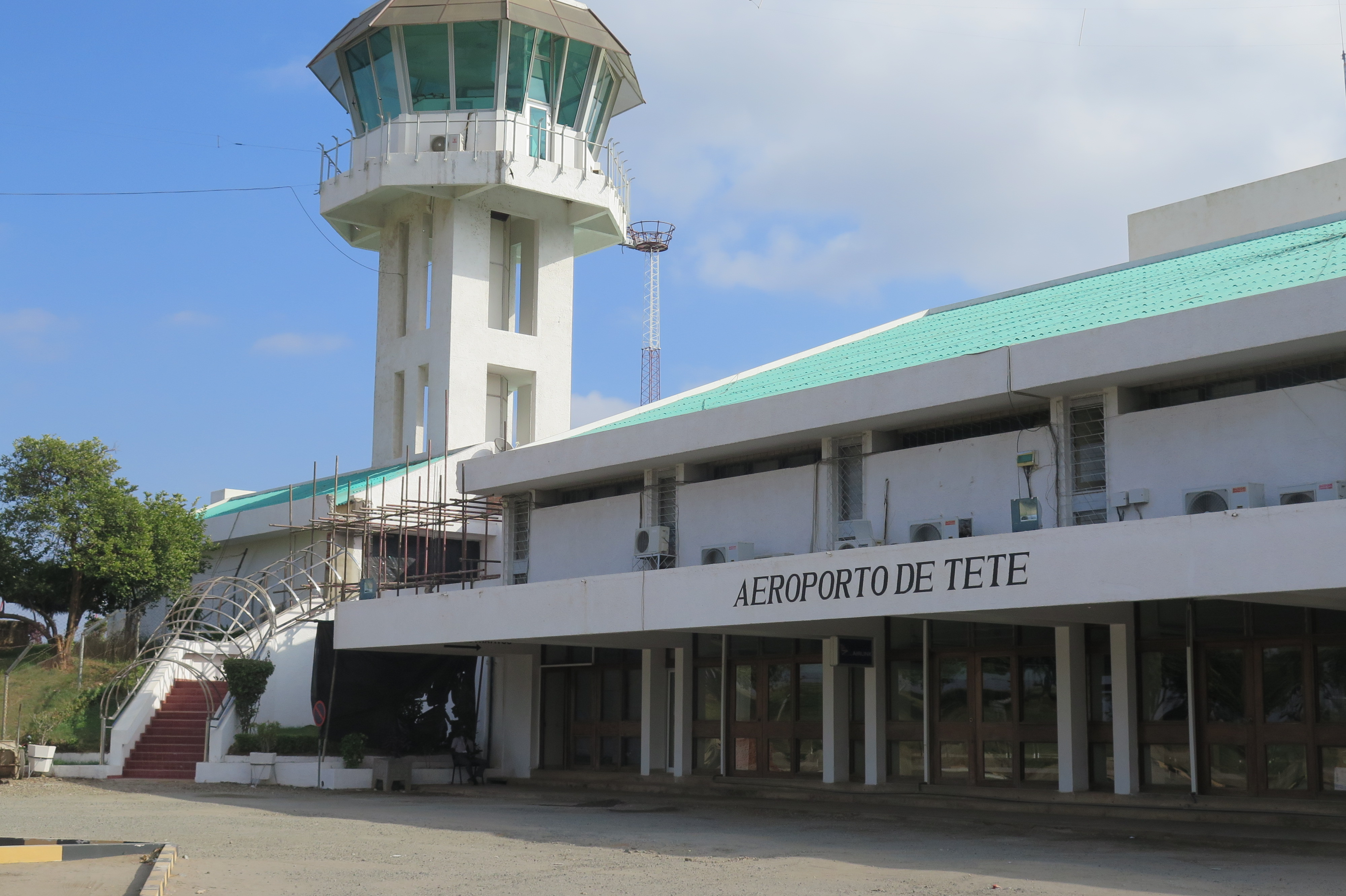
- IATA: TET; ICAO: FQTT

Summary
- Airport type: Public
- Operator: Aeroportos de Mocambique (Mozambique Airports Company)
- Serves: Tete
- Location: Tete, Mozambique
- Elevation AMSL: 525 ft / 160 m
- Coordinates: 16°06′29″S 33°38′25″E

Map
- Location of airport in Mozambique

Runways
Direction	Length		Surface
Direction	ft	m	Surface
01/19	8,225	2,507	Asphalt

Chingozi Airport (or Matundo Airport) is an airport in Tete, Mozambique (IATA: TET, ICAO: FQTT).

According to the BBC, a new airport may be built and the current one shut down to allow for coal mining activities.

== Airlines and destinations ==
Airlines	Destinations
Airlink	Johannesburg–O. R. Tambo
LAM Mozambique Airlines	Johannesburg–O. R. Tambo, Maputo
Moçambique Expresso	Maputo
