= LAM Mozambique Airlines =

Flag carrier of Mozambique

LAM – Mozambique Airlines LAM – Linhas Aéreas de Moçambique SARL

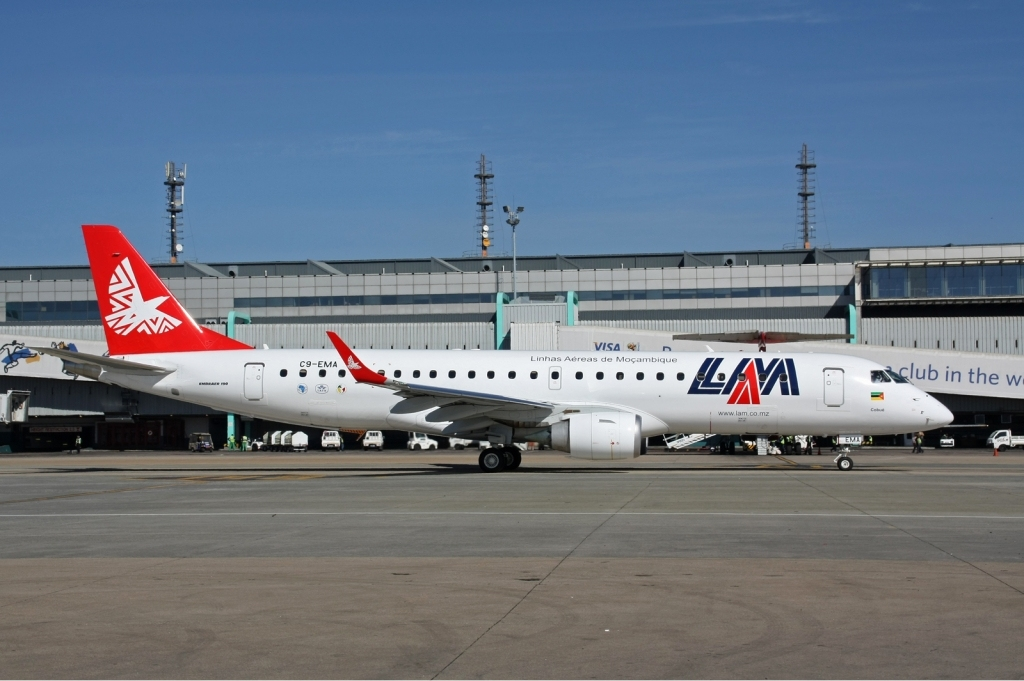
IATA	ICAO	Call sign
TM	LAM	MOZAMBIQUE
- Founded: 26 August 1936; 90 years ago (as DETA - Direcção de Exploração de Transportes Aéreos)
- Commenced operations: 22 December 1937
- Hubs: Maputo International Airport
- Focus cities: Beira Airport
- Frequent-flyer program: Flamingo Club
- Subsidiaries: Moçambique Expresso (100%)
- Fleet size: 7
- Destinations: 12
- Parent company: Government of Mozambique
- Headquarters: Maputo, Mozambique
- Key people: Américo Muchanga (CEO)
- Website: www.lam.co.mz/en

LAM - Mozambique Airlines, S. A. (LAM - Linhas Aéreas de Moçambique, S. A.) or Linhas Aéreas de Moçambique, Ltd., operating as LAM Mozambique Airlines (Portuguese: LAM Linhas Aéreas de Moçambique), was rebranded as Air Mozambique on 14 August 2026, and it is the flag carrier of Mozambique. The airline was established by the Portuguese colonial government of Mozambique in August 1936 as a charter carrier named DETA - Direcção de Exploração de Transportes Aéreos, and was renamed in 1980 following reorganisation. LAM Mozambique Airlines is based in Maputo, and has its hub at Maputo International Airport. It operates scheduled services in Southern Africa. The company is a member of the International Air Transport Association, and of the African Airlines Association since 1976.

== History ==
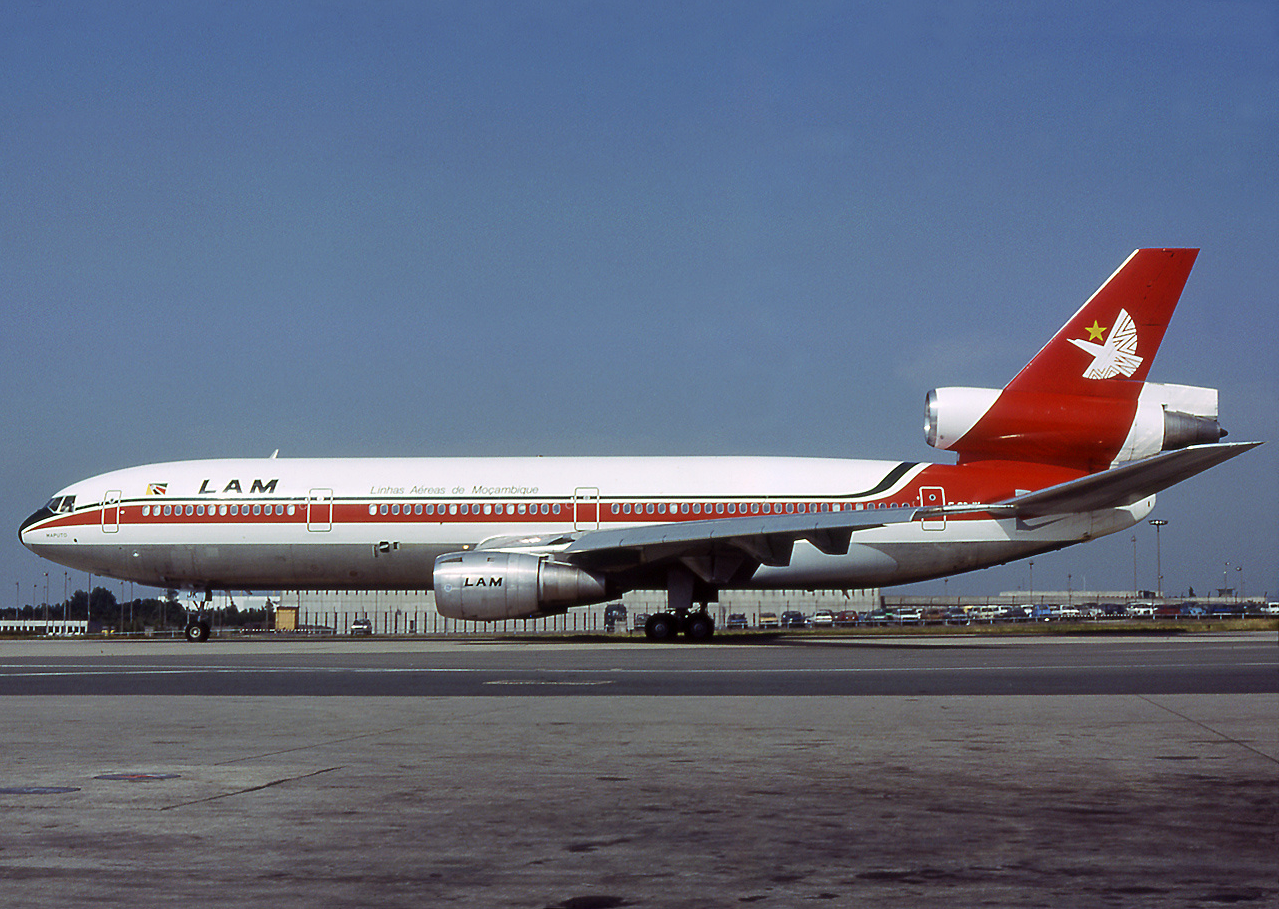
A France-registered McDonnell Douglas DC-10-30 wearing LAM Mozambique Airlines markings seen at Charles de Gaulle Airport in 1983.

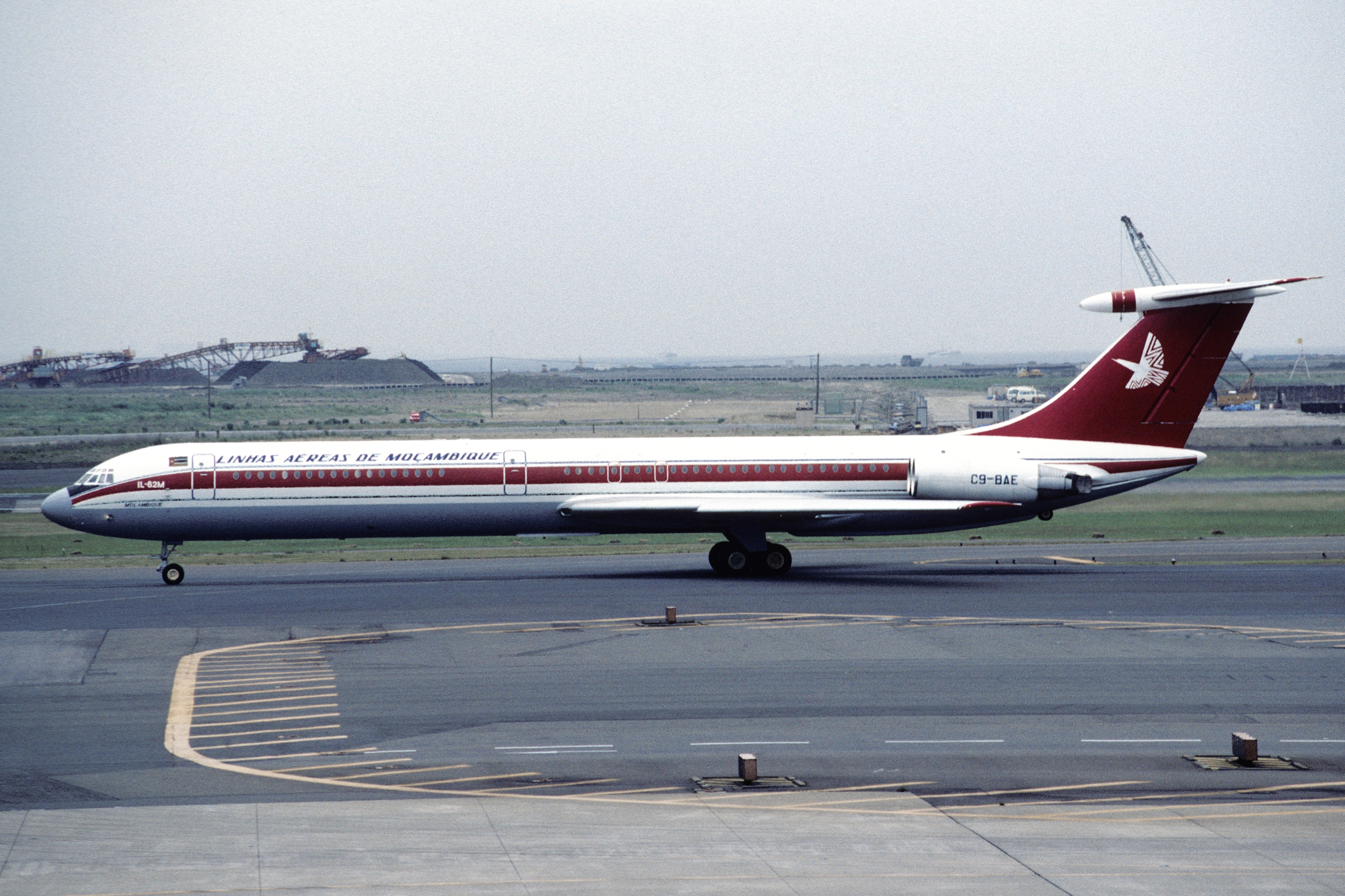
A former LAM Mozambique Airlines Ilyushin Il-62M

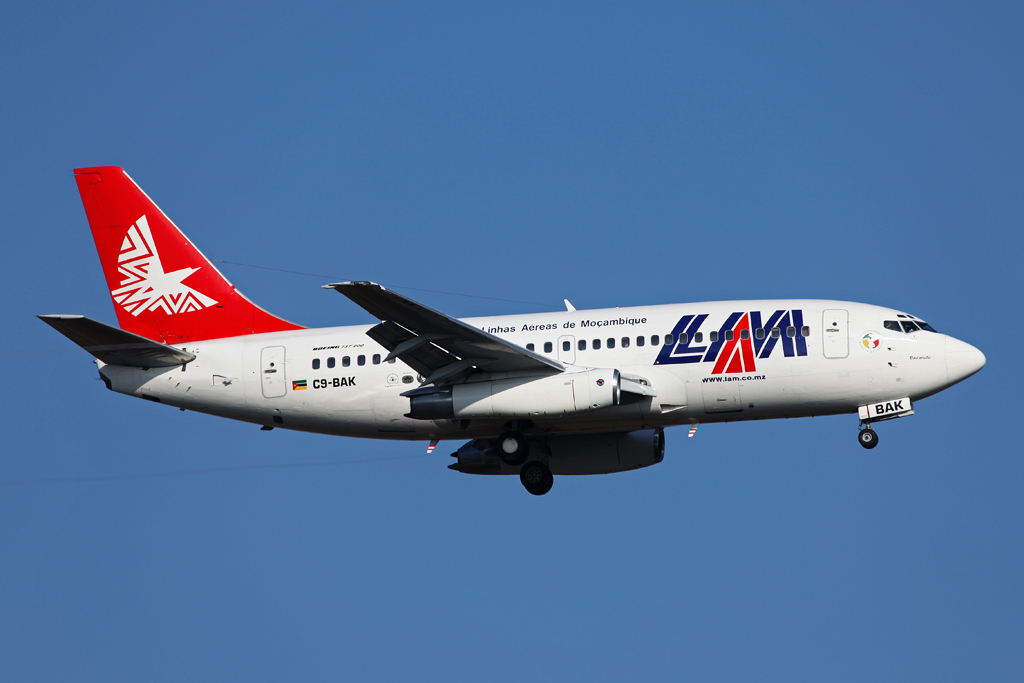
LAM Mozambique Airlines Boeing 737-200 Advanced in 2009

=== Early years ===
The airline was established on 26 August 1936 as DETA – Direcção de Exploração de Transportes Aéreos, as a division of the Department of Railways, Harbours and Airways of the Portuguese colonial government of Mozambique. Charter flights were operated for a short period of time; a regular airmail service commenced on 22 December 1937 using a Dragonfly, a Hornet and two Rapides. Shortly afterwards, these services started carrying passengers, most of them government officials. Flown with Rapides, the Lourenço Marques–Germinston route was one of the company’s mainstays in the early years; it was operated on a twice-weekly basis, and connected with Imperial Airways services to London. In April 1938, the eight-hour-long domestic Lourenço Marques–Inhambane–Beira–Quelimane coastal route was opened. DETA passengers that were flown along the Mozambican coast could also connect with Imperial services at Lourenço Marques. At that time, Imperial Airways ran a service between Cape Town and Cairo that called at Lourenço Marques. Early in 1938, DETA had signed a contract with Imperial for the provision of such feeder services. During the spring, another Hornet was incorporated into the fleet. Also in 1938, the airline acquired three Junkers Ju 52s and two more Rapides. The coastal service was extended farther north in October, reaching Port Amelia. At April 1939, one Drangonfly, one Hornet, three Junkers Ju 52s and six Rapides were part of the fleet. Most of the operations came to a halt following the outbreak of World War II.

A Beira–Salisbury route was launched in February 1947, with scheduled services to Durban and Madagascar also starting by the end of that year. By March 1952 the carrier was operating a 3,200 kilometres (2,000 mi) long route network that included domestic services as well as international ones to Durban, Johannesburg and Salisbury, served with a fleet of six Doves, five Rapides, three Douglas DC-3s, two Lockheed Lodestars, a Lockheed L-14 and a Junkers Ju 52. A new Moçambique–Nampula–Vila Cabral run that called at three more intermediate stops was opened in 1954. The last leg of this service was temporarily suspended when Vila Cabral was excluded from the airline's list of destinations, but flights to the city were later reinstated after Vila Cabral got linked with Beira via Vila Pery, Tete and Vila Coutinho. At March 1955, the carrier's fleet included three DC-3s, six Doves, one Dragon Fly, four Dragon Rapides, two Junkers Ju 52/3s, one Lockheed 14H, two Lodestars and two Horner Moths.

The airline was one of the last worldwide to operate the Junkers Ju 52s on scheduled services. Two of these aircraft were still in its fleet in April 1960, along with three DC-3s, four Doves, three Lodestars and four Rapides that operated a domestic network plus international services to Durban, Johannesburg and Salisbury. DETA started a fleet modernisation in the early 1960s, when three Fokker F27-200s ordered in June 1961, making the airline the 64th customer for the type, had already been handed over to the company by August 1962; the first of them was named "Lourenço Marques" after the capital city of Portuguese East Africa. DETA and Air Malawi inaugurated the Beira–Blantyre service in 1964; it was operated in a pool agreement between the two carriers. In 1965, Nova Freizo (Note: The name of the city served was actually Nova Freixo, as shown in a 1968 timetable.) was added to the route network; in November that year, a service linking Beira with Lourenço Marques was launched. In March 1966, DETA and Swazi Air commenced flying the Lourenço Marques–Manzini run on a joint basis. Two Boeing 737-200s were ordered in 1968 both to complement the three F27s, six DC-3s, one Dove, and one Beaver already in the fleet, and to support the company's regional expansion, that had grown up to five destinations regionally served with the addition of Blantyre and Manzini to the network. The first of these machines entered the fleet in 1969. The airline would order two more Boeing 737-200s in the forthcoming years, taking possession of the fourth one in 1973.

Mozambique gained its independence from Portugal in 1975. Intercontinental services started in 1976 serving the Lourenço Marques–Beira–Accra–Lisbon route, at first with a Boeing 707-320, and then with a Boeing 707-320C leased from Tempair International Airlines. In 1979, a Douglas DC-8 was ordered.

=== Renaming ===
DETA was Mozambique's flag carrier until 1980. Following allegations of corruption, the airline was restructured and renamed LAM – Linhas Aéreas de Moçambique early that year. Four more Boeing 737-200s were ordered in 1981. The Douglas DC-8-62 that had been ordered at the end of the DETA era arrived in 1982. In 1983, a Douglas DC-10-30 was ordered. Also in 1983, a Maputo–Manzini–Maseru service that was flown using Fokker F27 aircraft was launched in cooperation with Lesotho Airways. The DC-10-30 joined the fleet in 1984, and new services to East Berlin, Copenhagen and Paris were started. At March 1985, the carrier had 1,927 employees. At this time, the DC-10-30 and three Boeing 737-200s (including a convertible one) worked on a route network radiating from Maputo that served Beira, Berlin-Schonefeld, Dar-es-Salaam, Harare, Johannesburg, Lisbon, Lusaka, Manzini, Maseru, Nampula, Paris, Pemba, Sofia and Quelimane. TACV Cabo Verde Airlines leased the DC-10 in the weekends during 1985.

The first Boeing 737-300 entered the fleet in 1991. By April that year, employment was 1,948, and the fleet consisted of two Boeing 737-200s (including a convertible one), one Boeing 767-200ER (plus another one on order) and four CASA 212-200s. The company had returned the 737-300 to the lessor in 1995 because of its inability to afford the leasing costs of the aircraft, and a Boeing 767-200ER would follow the same fate late that year. An ex-Royal Swazi Fokker 100 was leased in October 1996. On 23 December 1998, LAM became a limited company and rebranded as LAM – Mozambique Airlines.

=== EU ban ===
Like all the airlines with an AOC issued in Mozambique, the carrier had been banned from operating into the European Union since April 2011. (Note: All airlines from Mozambique have been included in the last five lists of airlines banned in the EU released in April and December 2012, July and December 2013, and April 2014.) At that time, the company claimed the Mozambican Civil Aviation Institute was responsible for the actions taken by the European Commission against all Mozambican carriers, and argued that it was an airline with an excellent safety record. Prior to EuroAtlantic Airways launching Boeing 767-300ER operations to Lisbon on LAM's behalf in April 2011, the Lisbon–Maputo–Lisbon run was operated by TAP Portugal as a codeshare with LAM. The Maputo–Lisbon–Maputo route, originally launched in November 2011, was discontinued from late November that year, ahead of the constitution of a new autonomous division aimed at operating intercontinental routes. As of December 2014, the list of airlines banned in the EU still included LAM. In May 2017, the European Commission removed all airlines certified in Mozambique from their list of banned airlines after an audit confirmed that aviation safety had improved in the country.

=== 2020s ===
In February 2026 LAM Executives were arrested after the government of Mozambique was conducting a criminal investigation in LAM.

In March of 2026 the airline cooprerated with Boeing for a restructuring.

In June 2026 the airline tested a rebrand.

== Corporate affairs ==
=== Ownership and subsidiaries ===
As of August 2014, the state holds 91% of the shares and the employees hold the balance. The company Moçambique Expresso, set up in September 1995, is 100% owned by LAM.

=== Business trends ===
The airline has been loss-making for many years. Full annual reports do not appear to have been published, although financial results are now being released. Otherwise, the main sources for trends are industry and press reports, as shown below (as at year ending 31 December):

	2012	2013	2014	2015	2016	2017	2018	2019	2020	2021	2022	2023
Turnover (MZMm)						5,271	5,382	6,195	4,465	6,100	8,474	8,813
Profit after tax (MZMm)	loss	loss	loss	loss	loss	-2,212	-3,061	-3,631	-6,028	-1,262	-448	-3,977
Number of employees		715			909	695	865	831	831			
Number of passengers (000s)	612	684	788		640		539	589				
Passenger load factor (%)					66.4		73	70				
Number of aircraft (at year end)			7		9	6	6	5	2			
Notes/sources									(Note: 2020: Activities and income in 2020 were severely reduced by the impact of the coronavirus pandemic)			

=== Key people ===
Américo Muchanga was appointed CEO of the company on 10 July 2024.

== Destinations ==
As of February 2021, LAM Mozambique Airlines served nine domestic and three international African routes mainly from its home base at Maputo International Airport.

=== Codeshare agreements ===
LAM Mozambique Airlines has codeshare agreements with the following airlines:

- Ethiopian Airlines
- fastjet
- Kenya Airways
- South African Airways
- TAAG Angola Airlines
- TAP Air Portugal

== Fleet ==
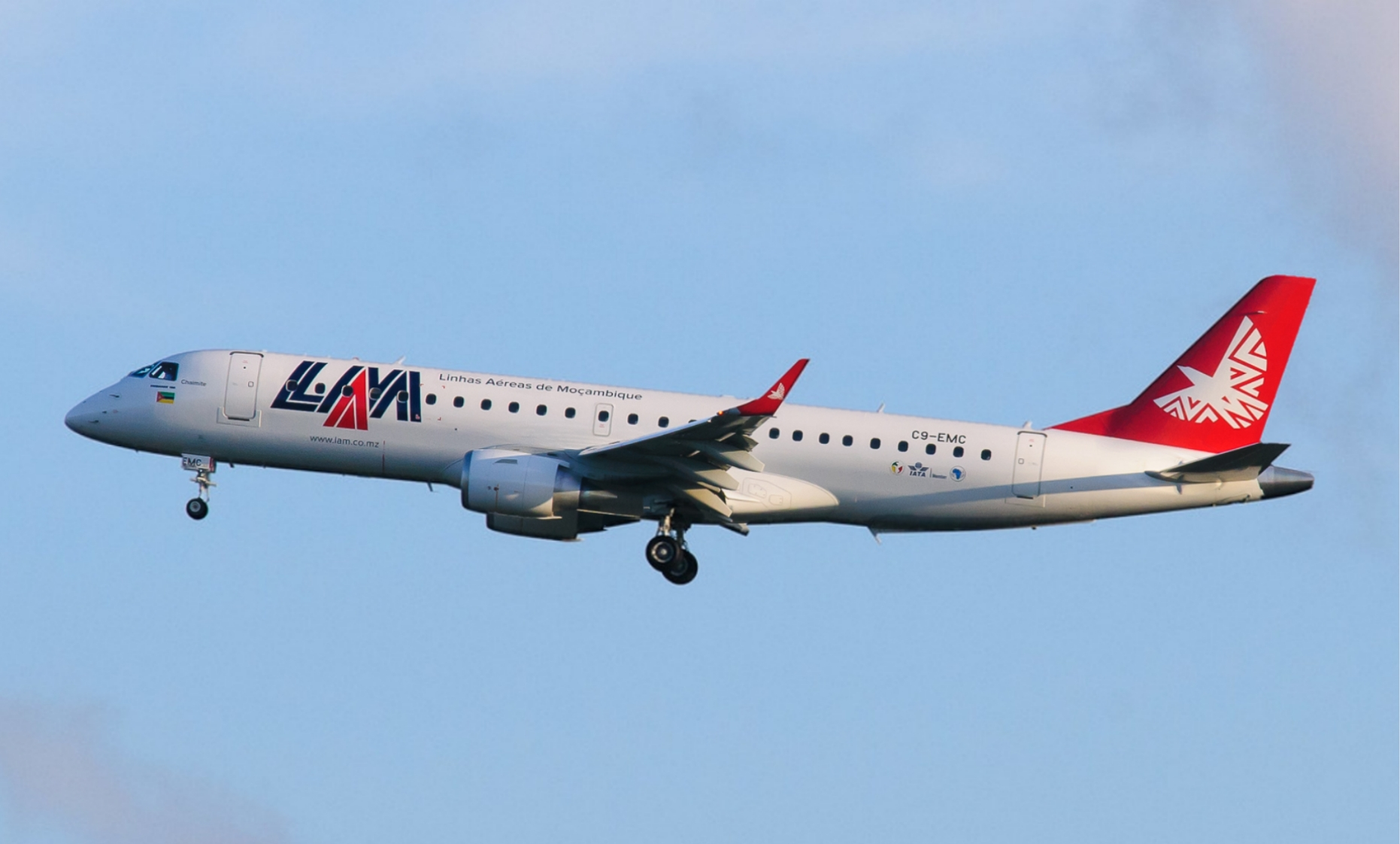
A former LAM Mozambique Airlines Embraer 190. This aircraft crashed as Flight 470.

=== Current fleet ===
The LAM – Mozambique Airlines fleet consists of the following aircraft (as of December 2025):

LAM – Mozambique Airlines fleet
Aircraft	In fleet	Orders	Passengers				Notes
Aircraft	In fleet	Orders	C	W	Y	Total	Notes
Boeing 737-500	1	—	—	—	—	134	
de Havilland Canada Dash 8 Q400	1	—	—	—	—	74	
Bombardier CRJ900	2	—	—	—	—	90	
Airbus A319	1	—	—	—	—	144	
Embraer 190	2	—				100	
Total	7	—					

=== Fleet development ===
LAM took possession of two Embraer 190, the first of which arrived in August 2009, and the second a month later. LAM Mozambique Airlines took delivery of a Boeing 737-500 on lease from GECAS in November 2012. Three Embraer 190s were in operation until November 2013, when one of them crashed in Namibia. In early December, a Boeing 737 was leased to fill the capacity shortage created by the crashed airframe. An order, that had been signed in November 2013, for three Boeing 737-700s valued at US$228 million, was announced in February 2014. In May 2025 LAM leased a Boeing 737-500 to, again, temporarily relieve pressure on its services, caused by the lack of aircraft.

=== Historical fleet ===
The airline previously operated the following aircraft:

- Airbus A340
- Antonov An-26
- Beech King Air 200
- Boeing 707-320
- Boeing 707-320C
- Boeing 707-420
- Boeing 737-100
- Boeing 737-200
- Boeing 737-200C
- Boeing 737-300
- Boeing 737-700
- Boeing 747SP
- Boeing 767-200ER
- Boeing 767-300ER
- Casa C-212-200 Aviocar
- Douglas C-47A
- Douglas C-47B
- Douglas C-53
- Embraer 190
- Fairchild Dornier Metro III
- Fokker 100
- Fokker F27-200
- Fokker F27-600
- Ilyushin Il-62MK
- Jetstream 41
- Indonesian Aerospace 212-200
- Lockheed L-1011-500
- Lockheed L-188AF
- McDonnell Douglas DC-10-30
- Partenavia P.68
- Raytheon Beechcraft 1900C

== Accidents and incidents ==
As of 29 November 2013, Aviation Safety Network records seven hull-loss events for the airline. Three of these events occurred in the DETA era, while the other four correspond to LAM. As of November 2013 there has been one fatal accident for LAM proper. Following is a list of these events.

Date	Location	Aircraft	Tail number	Aircraft damage	Fatalities	Description	Refs
23 February 1944	(Portugal) Quelimane	Lockheed L-14	CR-AAV	W/O	13/13	Crashed on takeoff at Quelimane Airport.	
12 February 1950	(Portugal) Lagoa Páti	Ju 52	CR-AAJ	W/O	0/15	Force landing.	
27 March 1970	(Portugal) Lourenço Marques	F27-200	CR-AIB	W/O	3/3	Crashed on a training flight at Lourenço Marques Airport.	
27 March 1983	(Mozambique) Quelimane	Boeing 737-200	C9-BAB	W/O	0/110	Undercarriage failure after landing some 400 metres (1,300 ft) short of the runway at Quelimane Airport.	
9 February 1989	(Mozambique) Lichinga	Boeing 737-200	C9-BAD	W/O	0/108	Overran the runway on landing at Lichinga Airport.	
5 October 1998	(Mozambique) Off Maputo	Boeing 747SP	ZS-SPF	W/O	0/66	Emergency landing, following an engine failure at 5,000 feet (1,500 m) that led to a fire. The aircraft, leased from South African Airways, was due to operate the Maputo–Lisbon route.	
29 November 2013	(Namibia) Bwabwata National Park	Embraer 190	C9-EMC	W/O	33/33	Investigation results indicated that the aircraft was deliberately crashed by the pilot.	

== See also ==
- Airlines of Africa
- Transport in Mozambique

== Bibliography ==
- Guttery, Ben R. (1998). Encyclopedia of African Airlines. Jefferson, NC: McFarland & Company. ISBN 0-7864-0495-7.
