= List of airports in Angola =

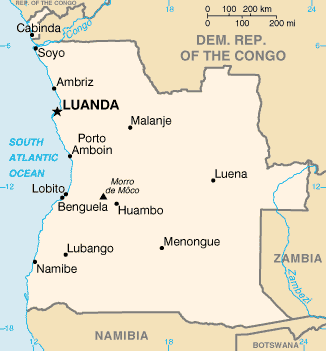
Map of Angola

This is a list of airports in Angola, sorted by location.

Angola, officially the Republic of Angola, is a country in southwest Africa bordered by Namibia on the south, Democratic Republic of the Congo on the north, and Zambia on the east; its west coast is on the Atlantic Ocean. The exclave province of Cabinda has a border with the Republic of the Congo and the Democratic Republic of the Congo. Angola is divided into twenty-one provinces and 326 municipalities. The country's official language is Portuguese and its capital is Luanda.

== Airports ==
Airport names shown in bold indicate the facility has scheduled passenger service on a commercial airline.

The airports are managed by the company Empresa Nacional de Exploração de Aeroportos e Navegação Aérea (ENANA - National company to manage airports and air navigation).

City served	Province	ICAO	IATA	Airport name	RWY (m)
Ambriz	Bengo	FNAM	AZZ	Ambriz Airport	16/34: 2420 x 39, dirt
Andulo	Bié		ANL	Andulo Airport	01/19: 3048 x 50, dirt
Benguela	Benguela	FNBG	BUG	**Benguela Airport**	14/32: 1600 x 30, asphalt
Cabinda	Cabinda	FNCA	CAB	**Cabinda Airport**	01/19: 2518 x 32, asphalt
Cacolo	Lunda Sul	FNCC		Cacolo Airport	11/29: 2042 x 59, dirt
Cafunfo	Lunda Norte	FNCF	CFF	Cafunfo Airport	06/24: 2612 x 42, asphalt
Camabatela	Cuanza Norte	FNCM		Camabatela Airport	17/35: 1411 x 39, grass
Camaxilo	Lunda Norte	FNCX		Camaxilo Airport	11/29: 1996 x 30, gravel
Camembe	Bengo	FNCB		Camembe Airport	03/21: 1536 x 69, grass
Cangamba	Moxico Leste		CNZ	Cangamba Airport	16/34: 2158 x 37, dirt
Capanda Dam	Malanje	FNCP	KNP	Kapanda Airport	15/33: 2006 x 46, asphalt H1: 20 dia., grass H2: 20 dia., grass
Catoca	Lunda Sul			Catoca Airport	
Catumbela	Benguela	FNCT	CBT	**Catumbela Airport**	02/20: 3716 x 47, asphalt
Cazombo	Moxico Leste	FNCZ	CAV	Cazombo Airport	17/35: 1975 x 40, dirt
Cuito Cuanavale	Cuando	FNCV	CTI	Cuito Cuanavale Airport	12/30: 2731 x 27, asphalt
Damba	Uíge	FNDB		Damba Airport	14/32: 1237 x 37, grass
Dirico	Cuando		DRC	Dirico Airport	11/29: 1433 x 33, gravel
Dundo	Lunda Norte	FNCH	PGI	Chitato Airport	13/31: 1792 x 35, asphalt
Dundo	Lunda Norte	FNDU	DUE	**Dundo Airport**	05/23: 2500 x 45, asphalt
Huambo	Huambo	FNNL		Huambo Airport	04/22: 457 x 13, dirt
Huambo	Huambo	FNHU	NOV	**Albano Machado Airport**	11/29: 2722 x 45, asphalt
Jamba	Huíla	FNJA	JMB	Jamba Airport	
Kuito	Bié	FNKU	SVP	**Joaquim Kapango Airport**	07/25: 2493 x 30, asphalt
Lobito	Benguela	FNLB	LLT	Lobito Airport	16/34: 1521 x 30, asphalt
Luanda	Luanda	FNLU	LAD	**Quatro de Fevereiro Airport**	05/23: 3712 x 43, asphalt 07/25: 2490 x 51, asphalt
Luanda	Bengo	FNBJ	NBJ	**Dr. Antonio Agostinho Neto International Airport**	06L/24R: 3,800 × 60, asphalt 06R/24L: 4000 × 60, asphalt
Luau	Moxico Leste	FNUA	UAL	Luau Airport	17/35: 1558 x 39, dirt
Luau	Moxico Leste	pending	pending	Luau International Airport	16/34: 2600, asphalt
Lubango	Huíla	FNUB	SDD	**Lubango Airport**	10/28: 2859 x 29, asphalt
Lucapa	Lunda Norte	FNLK	LBZ	Lucapa Airport	18/36: 2414 x 48, dirt
Luena	Moxico	FNUE	LUO	**Luena Airport**	11/29: 2393 x 30, asphalt
Lumbala N'guimbo	Moxico	FNBL	GGC	Lumbala Airport	10/28: 1966 x 35, dirt
Luzamba (Cuango-Luzamba)	Lunda Norte	FNLZ	LZM	Cuango-Luzamba Airport	03/21: 1588 x 61, asphalt
Malanje (Malange)	Malanje	FNMA	MEG	Malanje Airport	13/31: 2204 x 32, asphalt
Maquela do Zombo	Uíge	FNMQ		Maquela Airport	07/25: 1469 x 39, grass
M'banza-Kongo (Mbanza Congo)	Zaire	FNBC	SSY	Mbanza Congo Airport	17/35: 1832 x 30, asphalt
Menongue	Cubango	FNME	SPP	**Menongue Airport**	13/31: 3560 x 40, asphalt
N'dalatando	Cuanza Norte		NDF	N'dalatando Airport	
N'zeto	Zaire	FNZE	ARZ	N'zeto Airport	04/22: 2192 x 27, grass
Moçâmedes	Namibe	FNMO	MSZ	**Welwitschia Mirabilis Airport**	08/26: 2496 x 45, asphalt
Negage	Uíge	FNNG	GXG	Negage Airport	16/34: 2460 x 33, asphalt 09/27: 814 x 27, dirt
Nzagi (Andrada)	Lunda Norte	FNZG	NZA	Nzagi Airport	08/26: 2207 x 53, dirt
Ondjiva (Ongiva, N'giva)	Cunene	FNGI	VPE	**Ondjiva Pereira Airport**	12/30: 3295 x 35, asphalt
Porto Amboim	Cuanza Sul	FNPA	PBN	Porto Amboim Airport	06/24: 991 x 30, asphalt
Sanza Pombo	Uíge	FNPB		Sanza Pombo Airport	08/26: 1146 x 36, grass
Saurimo	Lunda Sul	FNSA	VHC	**Saurimo Airport**	14/32: 3402 x 45, asphalt
Soyo	Zaire	FNSO	SZA	**Soyo Airport**	07/25: 2121 x 50, asphalt
Sumbe	Cuanza Sul	FNSU	NDD	Sumbe Airport	05/23: 951 x 22, asphalt
Toto	Uíge	FNTO		Xamindele Airport	11/29: 1548 x 36, grass
Uíge	Uíge	FNUG	UGO	**Uíge Airport**	01/19: 2006 x 31, asphalt
Waku-Kungo (Waco Kungo)	Cuanza Sul	FNWK	CEO	Waco Kungo Airport	07/25: 1993 x 32, asphalt
Xangongo	Cunene	FNXA	XGN	Xangongo Airport	03/21: 2265 x 30, asphalt

== See also ==
- Empresa Nacional de Exploração de Aeroportos e Navegação Aérea E.P.
- National Air Force of Angola
- Transport in Angola
- List of airports by ICAO code: F#FN - Angola
- Wikipedia:WikiProject Aviation/Airline destination lists: Africa#Angola
