= Fly540 Angola =

Angolan airline (2011–2014)

IATA	ICAO	Call sign
F5	—	—
- Founded: 2009
- Commenced operations: April 2011
- Ceased operations: April 2014
- Hubs: Quatro de Fevereiro Airport; Cabinda Airport
- Fleet size: 2
- Destinations: 5
- Parent company: Fastjet
- Headquarters: Luanda, Angola
- Key people: Pablo Martins, commercial director

Fly540 Angola was a subsidiary of Fly540 that was based at Quatro de Fevereiro Airport in Luanda and Cabinda Airport in Cabinda, Angola. Parent company Fastjet suspended its operations in April 2014 pending restructuring, although it never resumed flights.

== History ==
Fly540 Angola was established in 2009 as a subsidiary of Kenya-based Fly540. It was the first privately owned airline in Angola. The subsidiary was created as Fly540 felt there was a lack of domestic and regional air service in and out of Angola. Fly540 faced difficulties in launching Fly540 Angola, as Angola was under scrutiny by the International Civil Aviation Organization (ICAO) and state-owned TAAG Angola Airlines had been placed on the EU blacklist due to safety concerns.

Operations were expected to begin in 2009, but Fly540 Angola did not obtain certification from the Instituto Nacional da Aviação Civil until February 2011. The airline commenced flights in April 2011 with a single ATR 72-500 and the Cabinda airport as its base. By February 2013, the fleet had grown to two ATR 72-200s and one ATR 72-500.

Fly540 Angola struggled in the market and accumulated losses. In June 2012, parent company Fly540 was acquired by Rubicon Diversified Investments, which made all of Fly540's subsidiaries part of its new venture Fastjet. However, in April 2014, Fastjet suspended Fly540 Angola's operations in order to restructure the airline from its full-service model to Fastjet's low-cost model. Fastjet subsequently decided to sell off Fly540 Angola's fleet, and the airline never resumed operations.

== Corporate affairs ==
Pablo Martins was the airline's commercial director at the time of its launch. Fastjet held a 60% stake in the airline.

== Destinations ==
At the time of its suspension, Fly540 Angola flew to the following destinations:

City	Airport	Notes
Benguela	Benguela Airport	—
Cabinda	Cabinda Airport	—
Luanda	Quatro de Fevereiro Airport	Hub
M'banza-Kongo	Mbanza Congo Airport	—
Soyo	Soyo Airport	—

== Fleet ==
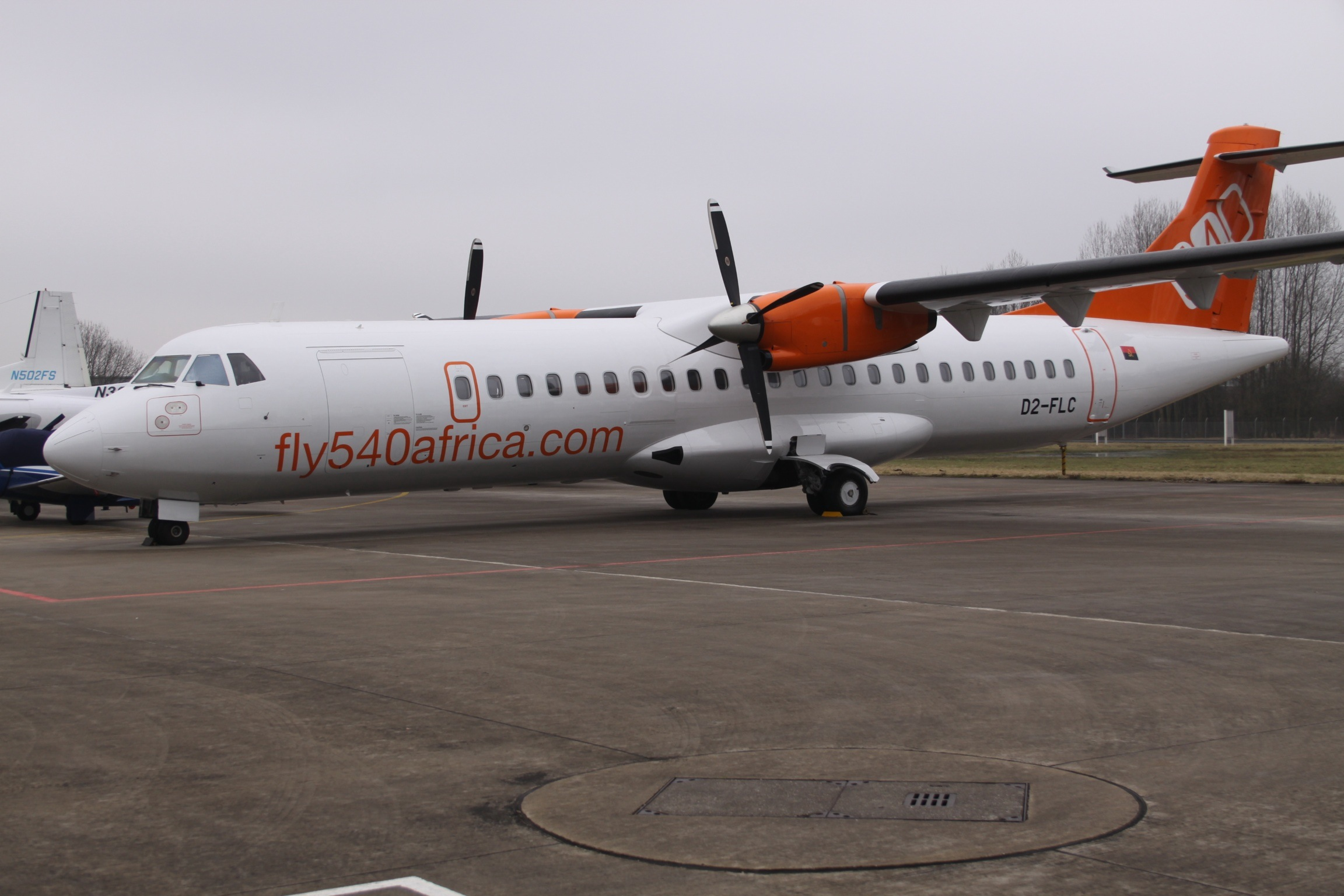
A Fly540 Angola ATR 72

Fly540 Angola operated two ATR 72 aircraft at the time of its suspension.

== Services ==
Fly540 Angola functioned as a full-service airline rather than as a low-cost airline. Its ATR 72-500 offered 56 economy class seats and 12 business class seats.
