= Uíge Airport =

Uíge Airport Carmona Airport
- IATA: UGO; ICAO: FNUG

Summary
- Airport type: Public
- Operator: Government
- Location: Uíge, Angola
- Elevation AMSL: 2,720 ft / 829 m
- Coordinates: 7°36′10″S 15°1′40″E

Map
- Location of Uíge/Carmona Airport in Angola

Runways
Direction	Length		Surface
Direction	ft	m	Surface
01/19	7,398	2,255	Asphalt
- Source: DAFIF GCM Landings.com Google Maps

Uíge/Carmona Airport (IATA: UGO, ICAO: FNUG) is a public use airport on the west side of Uíge, the capital of Uíge Province in Angola.

The runway additionally has a 65 metres (213 ft) displaced threshold on each end.

The Uíge non-directional beacon (Ident: UG) is located 2.2 nautical miles south of the runway.

== Airlines and destinations ==
Airlines	Destinations
TAAG Angola Airlines	Luanda

== See also ==
- List of airports in Angola
- Transport in Angola
