= Dundo Airport =

Airport in Angola

- IATA: DUE; ICAO: FNDU

Summary
- Airport type: Public
- Operator: Government
- Serves: Dundo
- Elevation AMSL: 2,451 ft / 747 m
- Coordinates: 7°24′05″S 20°49′05″E

Map
- Location of Airport in Angola

Runways
Direction	Length		Surface
Direction	m	ft	Surface
04/22	2,500	8,202	Asphalt
- Source: DAFIF GCM Landings.com Google Maps

Dundo Airport, or Camaquenzo I Airport (IATA: DUE, ICAO: FNDU), is an airport serving the city of Dundo, the capital of Lunda Norte Province in Angola.

The Dundo (Ident: DU) non-directional beacon is located on the field.

== Airlines and destinations ==
Airlines	Destinations
Fly Angola	Luanda
TAAG Angola Airlines	Luanda–Neto

== Accidents and incidents ==
On 5 January 2001, an Air Gemini Boeing 727 cargo aircraft (registered S9-BAI) ran off the runway upon landing at the airport, following a flight from Luanda, killing one ground worker. The accident occurred because the airplane had touched the ground short of the runway threshold, resulting in a collapsed landing gear and a subsequent skid-off.

== See also ==
- List of airports in Angola
- Transport in Angola
