= Saurimo Airport =

Airport in Angola

Saurimo Airport Henrique de Carvalho Airport
- IATA: VHC; ICAO: FNSA

Summary
- Airport type: Public
- Serves: Saurimo
- Elevation AMSL: 3,586 ft / 1,093 m
- Coordinates: 9°41′20″S 20°25′55″E

Map
- Location of Saurimo Airport in Angola

Runways
Direction	Length		Surface
Direction	m	ft	Surface
13/31	3,402	11,161	Asphalt
- Source: Landings.com GCM

Saurimo Airport (Portuguese: Aeroporto de Saurimo, (IATA: VHC, ICAO: FNSA)) is a public use airport serving the city of Saurimo in Lunda Sul Province, Angola. It was formerly known as Henrique de Carvalho Airport.

== Airlines and destinations ==
Airlines	Destinations
Fly Angola	Luanda
TAAG Angola Airlines	Luanda–Neto

== See also ==
- List of airports in Angola
- Transport in Angola
