= Cacolo Airport =

Airport in Lunda Sul, Angola

- IATA: none; ICAO: FNCC

Summary
- Airport type: Public
- Serves: Cacolo
- Location: Angola
- Elevation AMSL: 4,400 ft / 1,341 m
- Coordinates: 10°6′35″S 19°17′10″E

Map
- Location of Cacolo Airport in Angola

Runways
Direction	Length		Surface
Direction	ft	m	Surface
11/29		2,042	Dirt
- Sources: Landings.com Google Maps GCM

Cacolo Airport (ICAO: FNCC) is a public use airport 3.8 kilometres (2.4 mi) north of Cacolo, in Lunda Sul Province, Angola.

== See also ==
- List of airports in Angola
- Transport in Angola
