= Catoca Airport =

Airport in Angola

Catoca Airport Saurimo North Airport
- IATA: CTV; ICAO: none

Summary
- Airport type: Public
- Serves: Catoca diamond mine
- Elevation AMSL: 3,498 ft / 1,066 m
- Coordinates: 9°25′45″S 20°18′40″E

Map
- Location of Catoca Airport in Angola

Runways
Direction	Length		Surface
Direction	m	ft	Surface
17/35	2,415	7,923	Asphalt
- Source: Landings.com

Catoca Airport (IATA: CTV) is an airport in the Lunda Sul Province of Angola. It serves the Catoca diamond mine. The runway is 26 kilometres (16 mi) north of the city of Saurimo.

The runway was asphalted by Fidens under contract to the Catoca Mine. The usable runway was shortened slightly, and received twice weekly flights from Luanda by TAAG Angolan Airlines on a Monday and a Friday. While these flights were operated by TAAG, they were charter flights reserved for Catoca Mine employees only.

== See also ==
- List of airports in Angola
- Transport in Angola
