= Porto Amboim Airport =

Airport in Porto Amboim, Cuanza Sul, Angola

- IATA: PBN; ICAO: FNPA

Summary
- Airport type: Public
- Operator: Government
- Location: Porto Amboim, Angola
- Elevation AMSL: 16 ft / 5 m
- Coordinates: 10°43′20″S 13°45′50″E

Map

Runways
Direction	Length		Surface
Direction	m	ft	Surface
06/24	1,000	3,281	Asphalt
- Source: DAFIF GCM Landings.com Google Maps

Porto Amboim Airport (IATA: PBN, ICAO: FNPA) is an airport serving Porto Amboim, a coastal city in Cuanza Sul Province, Angola.

The Porto Amboim non-directional beacon (Ident: PA) is on the field.

== See also ==
- List of airports in Angola
- Transport in Angola
