= Cangamba Airport =

Airport in Moxico, Angola

- IATA: CNZ; ICAO: none

Summary
- Airport type: Public
- Serves: Cangamba
- Location: Angola
- Elevation AMSL: 3,894 ft / 1,187 m
- Coordinates: 13°42′33.8″S 19°51′37.3″E

Map
- Location of Cangamba Airport in Angola

Runways
Direction	Length		Surface
Direction	m	ft	Surface
16/34	2,158	7,080	Dirt
- Source: Great Circle Mapper Landings.com Google Maps

Cangamba Airport (ICAO: CNZ) is an airport serving Cangamba in Moxico Province, Angola.

== See also ==
- List of airports in Angola
- Transport in Angola
