= N'dalatando Airport =

Airport in Angola

- IATA: NDF; ICAO: none

Summary
- Airport type: Public
- Serves: N'dalatando
- Elevation AMSL: 2,684 ft / 818 m
- Coordinates: 9°16′50″S 14°59′00″E

Map
- Location in Angola

Runways
Direction	Length		Surface
Direction	m	ft	Surface
08/26	2,000	6,562	Asphalt
- Sources: Google Maps Fallingrain

N'dalatando Airport (IATA: NDF) is an airport serving the city of N'dalatando, in Cuanza Norte Province, Angola. The runway is 6 kilometres (3.7 mi) east of the city.

== See also ==
- List of airports in Angola
- Transport in Angola
