= Kapanda Airport =

Airport in Angola

- IATA: KNP; ICAO: FNCP

Summary
- Airport type: Public
- Serves: Capanda Dam
- Elevation AMSL: 3,366 ft / 1,026 m
- Coordinates: 9°46′15″S 15°27′25″E

Map
- Location of Kapanda Airport in Angola

Runways
Direction	Length		Surface
Direction	ft	m	Surface
15/33		2,006	Asphalt

Helipads
Number	Length		Surface
Number	ft	m	Surface
1	66	20	Grass
2	66	20	Grass
- Source: Landings.com Google Maps GCM

Kapanda Airport (IATA: KNP, ICAO: FNCP) is an airport serving the Capanda Dam project near Kapanda, a village in Malanje Province, Angola.

== See also ==
- List of airports in Angola
- Transport in Angola
