= Negage Airport =

Airport in Angola

- IATA: GXG; ICAO: FNNG

Summary
- Airport type: Public
- Serves: Negage, Angola
- Elevation AMSL: 4,105 ft / 1,251 m
- Coordinates: 7°45′15″S 15°17′15″E

Map
- Location of Negage Airport in Angola

Runways
Direction	Length		Surface
Direction	m	ft	Surface
16/34	2,400	7,874	Asphalt
09/27	800	2,625	Dirt
- Source: DAFIF GCM Landings.com Google Maps

Negage Airport (IATA: GXG, ICAO: FNNG) is an airport serving Negage, a town and municipality in Uíge Province in Angola. It was formerly a Portuguese military airbase.

The Negage non-directional beacon (Ident NG) is reportedly on the airfield.

== History ==
The present airport was built by the Portuguese Air Force, being inaugurated on 7 February 1961, as the Aerodrome-Base nº 3 (AB3, Aeródromo-Base nº 3). The base had an important role during the Angolan War of Independence. Besides the main airfield at Negage, the AB3 also controlled two satellite maneuver airfields, one at Maquela do Zombo (AM31) and the other at Toto (AM32).

== See also ==
- List of airports in Angola
- Transport in Angola
