= Luau Airport =

Airport in Moxico, Angola

Villa Teixeira de Sousa Airport Luau Airport
- IATA: UAL; ICAO: FNUA

Summary
- Airport type: Public
- Serves: Luau
- Location: Angola
- Elevation AMSL: 3,609 ft / 1,100 m
- Coordinates: 10°42′55″S 22°13′50″E

Map
- Location of airport in Angola

Runways
Direction	Length		Surface
Direction	m	ft	Surface
17/35	1,558	5,112	Dirt
- Source: GCM Landings.com Google Maps

Luau Airport (Portuguese: Aeroporto de Luau) (IATA: UAL, ICAO: FNUA) is an airport serving Luau, a municipality in the Moxico Leste Province of Angola. It is near the border between Angola and the Democratic Republic of the Congo.

In February, 2015, Luau International Airport was opened by Angolan President, José Eduardo dos Santos. The new airport is 7 kilometres (4.3 mi) west of Luau Airport.

== See also ==
- List of airports in Angola
- Transport in Angola
