= Chitato Airport =

Airport in Angola

- IATA: PGI; ICAO: FNCH

Summary
- Airport type: Public
- Serves: Dundo
- Elevation AMSL: 2,500 ft / 762 m
- Coordinates: 7°21′25″S 20°48′10″E

Map
- Location of Chitato Airport in Angola

Runways
| Direction | Length | | Surface |
| Direction | m | ft | Surface |
|---|---|---|---|
| 13/31 | 1,792 | 5,879 | Asphalt |
- Source: Great Circle Mapper Landings.com Google Maps

Chitato Airport (IATA: PGI, ICAO: FNCH) is an airport serving Dundo, Angola. The runway is 3 kilometres (1.9 mi) northwest of the city.

The Chitato (Ident: CH) and Dundo (Ident: DU) non-directional beacons are located south of the field.

Dundo is also served by the larger Dundo Airport, which is southwest of the city.

The IATA code refers to the town's colonial name of Portugalía.

== See also ==
- List of airports in Angola
- Transport in Angola
