= Luau International Airport =

Airport in Angola

- IATA: pending; ICAO: pending

Summary
- Airport type: Public
- Serves: Luau
- Elevation AMSL: 3,609 ft / 1,100 m
- Coordinates: 10°42′05″S 22°09′37″E

Map
- Location of Luau Int'l Airport in Angola

Runways
| Direction | Length | | Surface |
| Direction | m | ft | Surface |
|---|---|---|---|
| 16/34 | 2,600 | 8,530 | Asphalt |
- Source: Google Maps

Luau International Airport (IATA: pending, ICAO: pending) is an airport serving Luau, a municipality in the Moxico Leste Province of Angola. It is 6.5 kilometres (4.0 mi) west of the city, and may replace the Villa Teixeira de Sousa Airport (IATA: UAL, ICAO: FNUA), an unpaved airstrip that is within the city.

Luau city is on Angolan border with the Democratic Republic of the Congo, and is opposite the DRC city of Dilolo. The airport is part of a transportation plan that includes restoring rail and road linkage with the Katanga Province of the DRC. The airport was opened in February, 2015, by Angolan President, José Eduardo dos Santos.

== See also ==
- List of airports in Angola
- Transport in Angola
