= Damba Airport =

Airport in Damba, Angola

- IATA: none; ICAO: FNDB

Summary
- Airport type: Public
- Serves: Damba
- Elevation AMSL: 3,648 ft / 1,112 m
- Coordinates: 6°41′55″S 15°8′30″E

Map
- Location of Damba Airport in Angola

Runways
Direction	Length		Surface
Direction	m	ft	Surface
14/32	1,400	4,593	Dirt
- Source: Landings.com Google Maps GCM

Damba Airport (ICAO: FNDB) is a public use airport serving the town of Damba, in the Uíge Province of Angola.

== See also ==
- List of airports in Angola
- Transport in Angola
