= AZZ =

- IATA code for Ambriz Airport
- ICAO code for Azza Air Transport

== See also ==
- Bad Azz (disambiguation)
