= Camembe Airport =

Airport in Bengo, Angola

- IATA: none; ICAO: FNCB

Summary
- Airport type: Public
- Serves: Camembe
- Location: Angola
- Elevation AMSL: 2,264 ft / 690 m
- Coordinates: 8°07′05″S 14°30′00″E

Map
- Location of Camembe Airport in Angola

Runways
| Direction | Length | | Surface |
| Direction | m | ft | Surface |
|---|---|---|---|
| 03/21 | 1,280 | 4,199 | Gravel, grass |
- Sources: Landings.com, Google Maps, GCM

Camembe Airport (ICAO: FNCB) is a public use airport serving Camembe, Bengo Province, Angola.

== See also ==
- List of airports in Angola
- Transport in Angola
