= Xamindele Airport =

Airstrip serving Toto, Angola

Xamindele Airport Toto Airport
- IATA: none; ICAO: FNTO

Summary
- Airport type: Public
- Serves: Toto
- Elevation AMSL: 1,775 ft / 541 m
- Coordinates: 7°8′45″S 14°14′55″E

Map
- Location of Xamindele Airport in Angola

Runways
Direction	Length		Surface
Direction	m	ft	Surface
11/29	1,548	5,079	Grass
- Source: GCM Landings.com Google Maps

Xamindele Airport (Portuguese: Aeroporto Xamindele, ICAO: FNTO) is a public use airstrip serving the village of Toto in Uíge Province, Angola.

== See also ==
- List of airports in Angola
- Transport in Angola
