= Camabatela Airport =

Airport in Cuanza Norte, Angola

Camabatela Airport Aeroporto de Camabatela
- IATA: none; ICAO: FNCM

Summary
- Airport type: Public
- Serves: Camabatela
- Location: Angola
- Elevation AMSL: 1,410 ft / 430 m
- Coordinates: 8°10′40″S 15°23′00″E

Map
- Location of Camabatela Airport in Angola

Runways
Direction	Length		Surface
Direction	m	ft	Surface
17/35	1,260	4,134	Grass
- Source: Landings.com

Camabatela Airport Portuguese: Aeroporto de Camabatela (ICAO: FNCM) is a public use airport serving Camabatela, Cuanza Norte Province, Angola.

== See also ==
- List of airports in Angola
- Transport in Angola
