= Soyo Airport =

Airport in Angola

- IATA: SZA; ICAO: FNSO

Summary
- Airport type: Public
- Operator: Government
- Serves: Soyo
- Elevation AMSL: 15 ft / 5 m
- Coordinates: 6°8′27.8″S 12°22′18.6″E

Map
- Location of Airport in Angola

Runways
Direction	Length		Surface
Direction	m	ft	Surface
06/24	2,090	6,857	Asphalt
- Source: DAFIF GCM Landings.com Google Maps

Soyo Airport (IATA: SZA, ICAO: FNSO) is an airport serving Soyo, a city in Zaire Province in Angola.

The runway has an additional 150 metres (490 ft) displaced threshold on each end, for a total paved length of 2,122 metres (6,962 ft).

The Soyo non-directional beacon (Ident: SO) is located on the field.

== Airlines and destinations ==
Airlines	Destinations
TAAG Angola Airlines	Cabinda, Luanda–Neto

== See also ==
- List of airports in Angola
- Transport in Angola
