= Maquela Airport =

Airport in Angola

Aeroporto de Maquela do Zombo
- IATA: none; ICAO: FNMQ

Summary
- Airport type: Public
- Serves: Maquela do Zombo
- Elevation AMSL: 3,051 ft / 930 m
- Coordinates: 6°01′45″S 15°08′10″E

Map
- Location of airport in Angola

Runways
Direction	Length		Surface
Direction	m	ft	Surface
07/25	1,505	4,938	Gravel
- Source: GCM Landings.com Google Maps

Maquela Airport (ICAO: FNMQ) is an airport serving Maquela do Zombo, a city in Uíge Province, Angola.

During the Angolan War of Independence, the present airport served as the Portuguese Air Force's Maneuver Aerodrome 31, a satellite military airfield of the Base-Aerodrome 3 at Negage.

== See also ==
- List of airports in Angola
- Transport in Angola
