= Ambriz Airport =

Airport in Angola

- IATA: AZZ; ICAO: FNAM

Summary
- Airport type: Private
- Serves: Ambriz
- Elevation AMSL: 144 ft / 44 m
- Coordinates: 7°51′45″S 13°06′55″E

Map
- Location of the airport in Angola

Runways
Direction	Length		Surface
Direction	m	ft	Surface
16/34	2,420	7,940	Dirt
- Source: Great Circle Mapper Landings.com Google Maps

Ambriz Airport (IATA: AZZ, ICAO: FNAM) is an airport serving Ambriz, Angola.

The Ambriz non-directional beacon is north of the airfield.

== See also ==
- List of airports in Angola
- Transport in Angola
