= LBZ =

LBZ may refer to:

- Leighton Buzzard railway station, Bedfordshire, National Rail station code
- Lucapa Airport, Lucapa, Angola, IATA airport code
- A model of the Duramax V8 engine
- Lutyens Bungalow Zone in New Delhi
