= Camaxilo Airport =

Airport in Lunda Norte, Angola

Aeroporto de Camaxilo
- IATA: CMX; ICAO: FNCX

Summary
- Airport type: Public
- Serves: Camaxilo
- Location: Angola
- Elevation AMSL: 3,871 ft / 1,180 m
- Coordinates: 8°22′25″S 18°55′25″E

Map
- Location of Camaxilo in Angola

Runways
Direction	Length		Surface
Direction	m	ft	Surface
11/29	1,996	6,549	Gravel
- Source: GCM Landings.com Google Maps

Camaxilo Airport (ICAO: FNCX) is an airport serving Camaxilo in Lunda Norte Province, Angola. The runway is 3.8 kilometres (2.4 mi) south of the village.

== See also ==
- List of airports in Angola
- Transport in Angola
