= Lucapa Airport =

Airport in Lunda Norte, Angola

- IATA: LBZ; ICAO: FNLK

Summary
- Airport type: Public
- Serves: Lucapa
- Location: Angola
- Elevation AMSL: 3,041 ft / 927 m
- Coordinates: 8°26′30″S 20°43′55″E

Map
- Location of Lucapa Airport in Angola

Runways
Direction	Length		Surface
Direction	m	ft	Surface
18/36	2,420	7,940	Gravel
- Source: GCM Landings.com Google Maps

Lucapa Airport (IATA: LBZ, ICAO: FNLK) is an airport serving Lucapa (also spelled Lukapa), the capital of the Lunda Norte Province in northeastern Angola.

== See also ==
- List of airports in Angola
- Transport in Angola
