= CXM =

CXM may refer to:

- Communicating X-Machine, in the field of the theory of computation
- Customer experience management
- IATA code of Camaxilo Airport, in Lunda Norte Province, Angola.
- S.Coups X Mingyu, a subunit of South Korean boy band Seventeen also known as CxM
