= Air Gemini =

Airline of Angola

| IATA | ICAO | Call sign |
|---|---|---|
| — | GLL | TWINS |
- Founded: 1999
- Ceased operations: 2010
- Hubs: Quatro de Fevereiro Airport
- Fleet size: 6 (in 2011)
- Parent company: Air Gemini Limitada
- Headquarters: Luanda, Angola

Air Gemini, also known as Air Gemini Cargo, was an airline based in Luanda, Angola, operating chartered passenger and cargo flights into Quatro de Fevereiro Airport on behalf of the local mining industry, as well as services for humanitarian aid missions.

== History ==
Air Gemini was founded in 1999. Originally, it was a cargo airline, but in 2002, the airline started passenger services. Due to safety concerns regarding the whole Angolan airline industry, Air Gemini was on the list of air carriers banned in the European Union. In 2010, it entered financial difficulties and reduced operations.

The airline stopped flying in 2010.

== Fleet ==
In 2011, the Air Gemini fleet included the following aircraft:

- 3 Boeing 727
- 3 McDonnell Douglas DC-9

== Accidents and incidents ==
On 5 January 2001, an Air Gemini Boeing 727 cargo aircraft (registered S9-BAI) ran off the runway upon landing at Dundo Airport following a flight from Luanda, killing one ground worker. The accident occurred because the airplane had touched the ground short of the runway threshold, resulting in a collapsed landing gear and a subsequent skid-off.
