= NDD =

NDD may refer to:

== Medicine ==
- Nature deficit disorder
- Neurodevelopmental delay
- Neurodevelopmental disorder

== Other uses ==
- Nagoya Diamond Dolphins, a Japanese basketball team
- National Direct Dialing, in telephony
- non-DAC donor, outside the Development Assistance Committee
- Sumbe Airport, Angola (IATA: NDD)
