= Fly Angola =

Angolan private airline

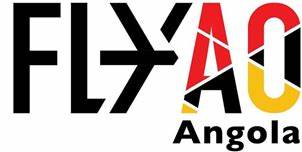
IATA	ICAO	Call sign
EQ	—	N/A
- Founded: 2018
- Commenced operations: September 2018
- AOC #: Yes
- Hubs: Quatro de Fevereiro Airport
- Fleet size: 1
- Destinations: 5
- Parent company: Gestomobil
- Headquarters: Luanda, Angola
- Key people: Belarnício Muangala (general manager)
- Employees: 72

Fly Angola (FLA), stylized FLУ AO Angola, (Note: AO is the ISO 3166-1 alpha-2 code for Angola, the airline's country hub.) is a privately owned airline based in the country of Angola, specifically at Quatro de Fevereiro Airport in the nation's capital, Luanda. It was established in September 2018 by a "Portuguese agency" and "backed up" by Angolan investment firm Gestomobil. The airline flies to Angola's provincial capitals from its hub.

== Fleet ==
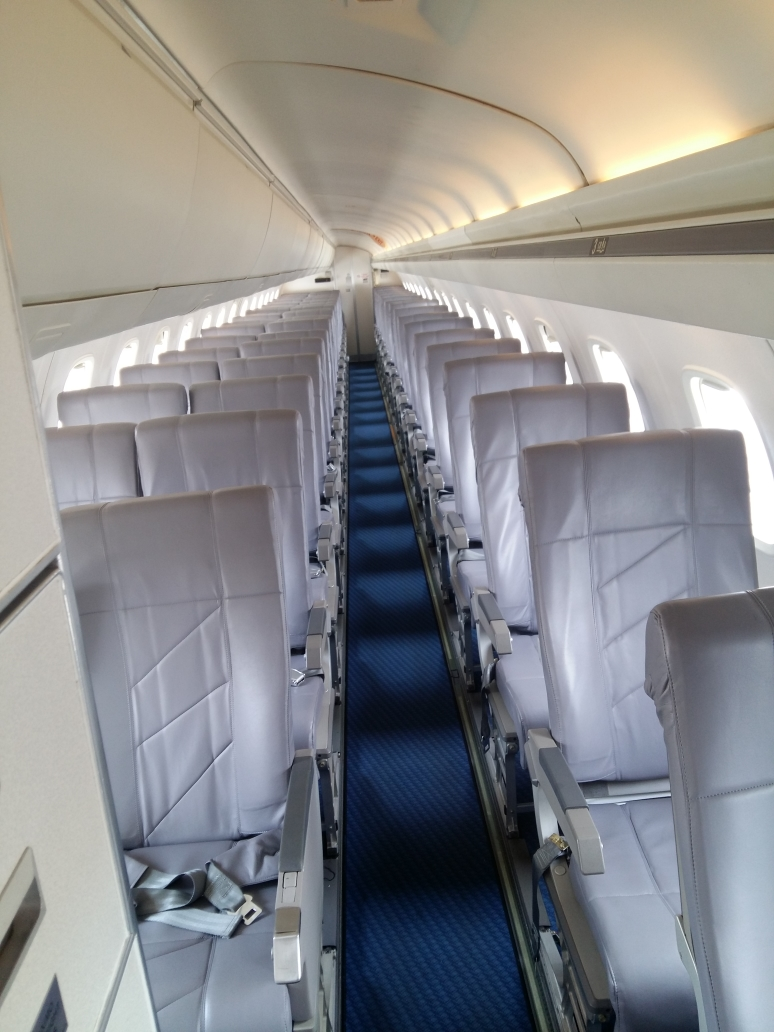
Fly Angola's Embraer EMB-145STD cabin

As of August 2025, the airline only owns one Embraer EMB-145 LR registered D2-FDF filled with 50 standard economy class in a 1-2 configuration, with a second one planned to be ordered once the airline has secured its own Air Operator's Certificate. It is said that the motive behind the single-aircraft order is as a "trial." The airline was planning in late 2019 to buy a 30-seat Embraer EMB-120. The airline's services are performed by a local partner, Angolan airline AeroJet, which owns Fly Angola's AOC.

== Destinations ==
Fly Angola operates domestic flights from Luanda to four major cities.

Legend
Base
Future (or possible future) destination
Terminated destination

Country	City	Province/Region	Airport	Start	End	Notes	Refs
Angola	Lubango	Huila Province	Lubango Airport	N/A	?		
Angola	Benguela	Benguela Province	Benguela Airport	2019	?		
Angola	Dundo	Lunda Norte Province	Dundo Airport	2019	?		
Angola	Luanda	Luanda Province	Quatro de Fevereiro International Airport	2018	?	Base	
Angola	Saurimo	Lunda Sul Province	Saurimo Airport	2019	?		

== COVID-19 pandemic ==
In March 2020, Fly Angola issued a statement on its Facebook account that it will "significantly reduce its activity in the coming days," and "will make adjustments as necessary," in accordance to the Angolan government's measures concerning the COVID-19 pandemic.
