= Sumbe Airport =

Airport in Angola

Sumbe Airport N'Gunza
- IATA: NDD; ICAO: FNSU

Summary
- Airport type: Public
- Serves: Sumbe
- Elevation AMSL: 36 ft / 11 m
- Coordinates: 11°10′05″S 13°50′50″E

Map
- Location of Sumbe Airport in Angola

Runways
Direction	Length		Surface
Direction	m	ft	Surface
05/23	951	3,120	Asphalt
- Sources: DAFIF GCM Landings.com Google Maps

Sumbe Airport (IATA: NDD, ICAO: FNSU) is an airport serving the city of Sumbe in Cuanza Sul Province, Angola.

The Sumbe non-directional beacon (Ident: SU) is located on the field.

== See also ==
- List of airports in Angola
- Transport in Angola
