= Bom Jesus, Ícolo e Bengo =

Bom Jesus
- Municipality
- Location in Angola
- Coordinates: 9°10′07″S 13°34′00″E
- Country: Angola
- Province: Icolo e Bengo

Area
  - Total: 311 km^{2} (120 sq mi)

Population (2024)
  - Total: 35,372
  - Density: 114/km^{2} (295/sq mi)
- Time zone: UTC+1 (WAT)

Bom Jesus is a municipality in Icolo e Bengo Province, Angola. Prior to the creation of Icolo e Bengo Province in 2024, it had been a commune in the municipality of Icolo e Bengo in Luanda Province. It is the site of Luanda's new international airport.
