= Chitato =

- Municipality
- Location in Angola
- Coordinates: 7°22′S 20°50′E
- Country: Angola
- Province: Lunda Norte

Area
  - Total: 4,400 km^{2} (1,700 sq mi)

Population (2014 Census)
  - Total: 195,136
  - Density: 44/km^{2} (110/sq mi)
- Time zone: UTC+1 (WAT)

Chitato is a municipality of the province of Lunda Norte, in Angola. The population is 195,136 (2014 census). The municipality consists of the communes Luachimo and Dundo-Chitato.

It is served by Chitato Airport.
