= Cabinda Airport =

Airport in Cabinda, Angola

Cabinda Airport Aeroporto de Cabinda
- IATA: CAB; ICAO: FNCA

Summary
- Airport type: Public
- Operator: Government
- Serves: Cabinda, Angola
- Elevation AMSL: 66 ft (20 m)
- Coordinates: 5°35′50″S 12°11′17″E

Map
- Location of Airport in Angola

Runways
Direction	Length		Surface
Direction	m	ft	Surface
18/36	2,500	8,202	Asphalt
- Source: DAFIF GCM Landings.com

Cabinda Airport (Portuguese: Aeroporto de Cabinda) (IATA: CAB, ICAO: FNCA) is an airport serving Cabinda, a city in the Cabinda Province, an exclave of Angola.

== Airlines and destinations ==
Airlines	Destinations
TAAG Angola Airlines	Luanda–Agostinho Neto, Soyo

== See also ==
- List of airports in Angola
- Transport in Angola
