= Hermann Baumann (social anthropologist) =

German Africa expert (1902–1972)

Hermann Baumann (February 9, 1902 – June 30, 1972) was an influential German Africa expert.

In 1928, Baumann became editor-in-chief of the Zeitschrift für Ethnologie, Berlin, a post which he held until 1941. During the Third Reich, he was active as a government adviser, working on the eventual restoration of German colonies in Africa. After the war, he continued to work as a government adviser.

The museum in Dundo, Angola, houses 1,018 pieces collected by Baumann in 1954.

Baumann was Professor of African Studies and Social Anthropology in Vienna and Munich. He retired in 1972, and returned to Angola, to continue the work on the material he had collected two decades earlier. Baumann fell ill with malaria, and died within hours of his transfer to Munich from a Lisbon hospital.

== Bibliography ==
- Jürgen Braun: Eine deutsche Karriere. Die Biographie des Ethnologen Hermann Baumann (1902–1972). 1995; ISBN 3-929115-50-6 (Münchener ethnologische Abhandlungen)
- Peter Linimayr: Wiener Völkerkunde im Nationalsozialismus, Frankfurt am Main, 1994
- Helmut Straube: Hermann Baumann. 9. Februar 1902 – 30. Juni 1972. In: Paideuma 18, 1972: 1–15
