= Mbanza Congo Airport =

Airport in M'banza Congo, Zaire, Angola

Aeroporto Pedro Moisés Artur Aeroporto Pedro Moisés Artur
- IATA: SSY; ICAO: FNBC

Summary
- Airport type: Public
- Operator: Government
- Location: M'banza Congo, Angola
- Elevation AMSL: 1,860 ft (570 m)
- Coordinates: 6°16′15″S 14°14′50″E

Map
- Location of Airport in Angola

Runways
Direction	Length		Surface
Direction	m	ft	Surface
16/34	1,925	6,316	Asphalt
- Source: DAFIF GCM Landings.com Google Maps

Mbanza Congo Airport (IATA: SSY, ICAO: FNBC) is an airport serving M'banza Congo, the capital of Zaire Province in northwestern Angola. Passenger flights resumed in August 2017 following an eight-year gap, during which the airport was closed for construction works.

The Mbanza Congo non-directional beacon (Ident: SS) is located just northeast of the field.

== History ==
The airport closed in 2009 for a refurbishment project and did not reopen to commercial air traffic until August 2017, when Sonair introduced domestic flights.

== Accidents ==
- On April 27, 1994, a Transafrik International Boeing 727 touched down 2 meters short of the runway at the airport. The undercarriage struck a ditch and collapsed. The aircraft kept on the runway, veered off the right side of the runway into a road and struck a bus. All seven people on board the bus died. The three people on board the plane survived.
- On June 28, 2007, a TAAG Angola Airlines Boeing 737 touched down at the airport, overran the runway and crashed into some cars and a building. 5 of the 78 people on board, including one on the ground was killed.

== See also ==
- List of airports in Angola
- Transport in Angola
