= Empresa Nacional de Exploração de Aeroportos e Navegação Aérea =

Empresa Nacional de Navegação Aérea - Empresa Pública - ENANA (National Air Navigation Company - Public Company) is a publicly owned company operating the airports in Angola and controlling the civil air traffic in Angola. The company was created by decree No. 14 on February 13, 1980, separating the day-to-day operations from the Direcção Nacional da Aviação Civil (National Directory of Civil Aviation) within the transport ministry. ENANA is a Empresa Publica under the transport ministry.

The predecessor of ENANA was created on May 11, 1955, by the Portuguese colonial administration of Angola.

== See also ==
- List of airports in Angola
