= Instituto Nacional da Aviação Civil =

The Instituto Nacional da Aviação Civil (English: National Institute of Civil Aviation), or INAVIC, is a public institution with its own juridical personality under supervision by the Ministry of Transportation of Angola. The task and purpose of INAVIC is the supervision of all aspects of air transport in Angola. INAVIC was created by Presidential Decree No. 4/05 of 19 January 2005. The general director of INAVIC is Gaspar Santos.
