= Damba (municipality) =

- Municipality and town
- Location in Angola
- Coordinates: 6°53′S 15°01′E
- Country: Angola
- Province: Uíge Province

Population (2014 Census)
  - Municipality and town: 66,472
  - Urban: 12,000
- Time zone: UTC+1 (WAT)

Damba is a town and a municipality in Uíge Province in Angola. The municipality had a population of 66,472 in 2014.

It is served by Damba Airport.
