= Bad Azz =

Bad Azz may refer to:

- Bad Azz (rapper), American rapper
- Bad Azz (album), a 2006 album by Lil Boosie
