= Cacolo =

- Municipality and town
- Location in Angola
- Coordinates: 10°08′00″S 19°16′00″E
- Country: Angola
- Province: Lunda Sul Province

Population (2014 Census)
  - Municipality and town: 31,895
  - Urban: 13,498
- Time zone: UTC+1 (WAT)
- Climate: Aw

Cacolo is a town and municipality in Lunda Sul Province in Angola. The municipality had a population of 31,895 in 2014.
