= Dundo =

Dundo Dundo-Chitato
- City
- Location in Angola
- Coordinates: 7°22′48.4″S 20°50′06.2″E
- Country: Angola
- Province: Lunda Norte Province
- Municipality: Chitato
- Commune: Luachimo

Area
  - Total: 862 sq mi (2,233 km^{2})

Population (2024 census)
  - Total: 240,410
  - Density: 278.8/sq mi (107.7/km^{2})
- Time zone: UTC+1 (WAT)
- Climate: Aw

Dundo, or Dundo-Chitato, is a former mining town, with a population of 240,410 (2024 census), now a city and the provincial capital of Lunda Norte in Angola. Established in the early part of the 20th century as a planned diamond mining community, Dundo has continued to grow, has its own airport and is now being superseded by a new city, New Dundo.

The city is the home of the football club called Grupo Desportivo Sagrada Esperança, which plays at Estádio Quintalão. The local museum houses objects collected by social anthropologist, Hermann Baumann.

== History ==
The settlement of Dundo was founded in 1912 after the discovery of diamonds in the Musalala River, a tributary of the Chiumbue River located in the north-eastern border of Angola where it today adjoins the Democratic Republic of the Congo. Formed as a planned community to support the burgeoning mining operations, Dundo grew after the private investor company, Diamang (formed in 1917) were given the diamond mining concession in the entire region of Lunda, basing their headquarters in the town.

Diamang was created under the auspices of Portugal, Angola's then colonial master, with further investment from other European nations. The region was mainly stable under colonial rule, but after independence in 1975, Angola was engulfed in civil war. This led to increased and unplanned population growth in the country's mining towns as people fled the insecurity of the countryside. In 1978 the Angolan government created the province of Lunda Norte and established the nearby town of Lucapa as the provincial capital. Up-until 1980 the mines south-east of Dundo annually produced close to 10 percent of the world's total gem-quality supply of diamonds.

The effects of the Angolan civil war (1975-2002) impacted Dundo's diamond mining operations. The rebel forces of UNITA (União Nacional para a Independência Total de Angola) sought to disrupt the governmental mining companies of Diamang and Endiama, by allowing workers to act as wildcat prospectors. This and the continued violence saw the collapse of Endiama in Dundo with the loss of 18,000 jobs. This resulted in miners turning to UNITA, who either took a cut of their profits or sold the diamonds to fund their resistance to the government, this practice was known as blood diamonds.

In 2000, the government changed the provincial capital of Lunda Norte from Lucapa to Dundo due to its 'greater architectural design, size and economic importance'. A new settlement, New Dundo, is being built next to Dundo to cement the cities importance in the region. As of 2022, several thousand new apartments were completed and delivered to new residents in New Dundo.

== Notable buildings ==
The city has its own airport, Dundo Airport. Built within the heart of Dundo, it has seen constant expansion throughout the 2010s, with a new terminal constructed in 2012, and an extended main runway in 2014 to allow larger aircraft to access the city. The Dundo Museum, built in the 1950s, has been described as having "one of the most distinguished collections of ethnographic art from wooden traditional masks and wooden sculptures of the local heterogeneous Chokwe people". As well as traditional pieces it holds modern media collections, such as photographic and audio recordings of the indigenous people. Dundo is also home to Sagrada Esperança Stadium, the Diamond Hotel and Middle Polytechnic Institute.

Dundo has a large hydroelectric dam and adjoining power plant located to the northeast of the city on the Luachimo River.

== Orientation ==
Dundo is located on the border of Angola and the Democratic Republic of Congo. The city is located 125 kilometers to the south of Tshikapa, Democratic Republic of Congo. Dundo is located 371 kilometers to the north of Saurimo, Angola and connected to the city by the EN180 highway. New Dundo is a large-scale planned community located to the southwest of the city. New Dundo is composed of modern concrete apartment blocks on paved streets, in contrast to the more informally built and laid-out old city of Dundo. The EN180 highway runs through the center of the old city and is lined by large old growth trees. The road connects New Dundo and Dundo Airport to the Dundo City Center where there are several large government buildings, hospital, the Dundo Museum and Lunda Norte Governor's complex.

== Sport ==
The city is home to the football club G.D. Sagrada Esperança that plays in Girabola, the highest national championship. The team plays its home games in the city stadium, the Estádio Quintalão.

== Religion ==
Since 2012, the bishop of the Catholic Diocese of Dundo is Bishop Estanislau Marques Chindekasse.

== Climate ==
Climate data for Dundo
Month	Jan	Feb	Mar	Apr	May	Jun	Jul	Aug	Sep	Oct	Nov	Dec	Year
Record high °C (°F)	33.3 (91.9)	34.4 (93.9)	33.9 (93.0)	32.8 (91.0)	32.8 (91.0)	34.4 (93.9)	33.9 (93.0)	35.0 (95.0)	34.4 (93.9)	33.3 (91.9)	32.2 (90.0)	31.7 (89.1)	35.9 (96.6)
Mean daily maximum °C (°F)	29.4 (84.9)	29.4 (84.9)	30.0 (86.0)	29.4 (84.9)	30.0 (86.0)	31.1 (88.0)	31.7 (89.1)	31.7 (89.1)	30.6 (87.1)	30.0 (86.0)	28.3 (82.9)	28.9 (84.0)	30.1 (86.2)
Daily mean °C (°F)	24.4 (75.9)	24.7 (76.5)	25.0 (77.0)	24.7 (76.5)	24.2 (75.6)	23.3 (73.9)	23.6 (74.5)	25.0 (77.0)	25.0 (77.0)	24.7 (76.5)	23.9 (75.0)	24.2 (75.6)	24.4 (75.9)
Mean daily minimum °C (°F)	19.4 (66.9)	20.0 (68.0)	20.0 (68.0)	20.0 (68.0)	18.3 (64.9)	15.6 (60.1)	15.6 (60.1)	18.3 (64.9)	19.4 (66.9)	19.4 (66.9)	19.4 (66.9)	19.4 (66.9)	18.8 (65.8)
Record low °C (°F)	17.8 (64.0)	18.3 (64.9)	17.8 (64.0)	17.8 (64.0)	13.9 (57.0)	12.2 (54.0)	10.6 (51.1)	13.3 (55.9)	16.1 (61.0)	17.2 (63.0)	17.2 (63.0)	17.8 (64.0)	10.6 (51.1)
Average precipitation mm (inches)	181.1 (7.13)	139.7 (5.50)	186.7 (7.35)	200.9 (7.91)	48.3 (1.90)	3.0 (0.12)	7.1 (0.28)	41.4 (1.63)	91.2 (3.59)	186.7 (7.35)	219.2 (8.63)	196.3 (7.73)	1,502 (59.13)
Source: Sistema de Clasificación Bioclimática Mundial

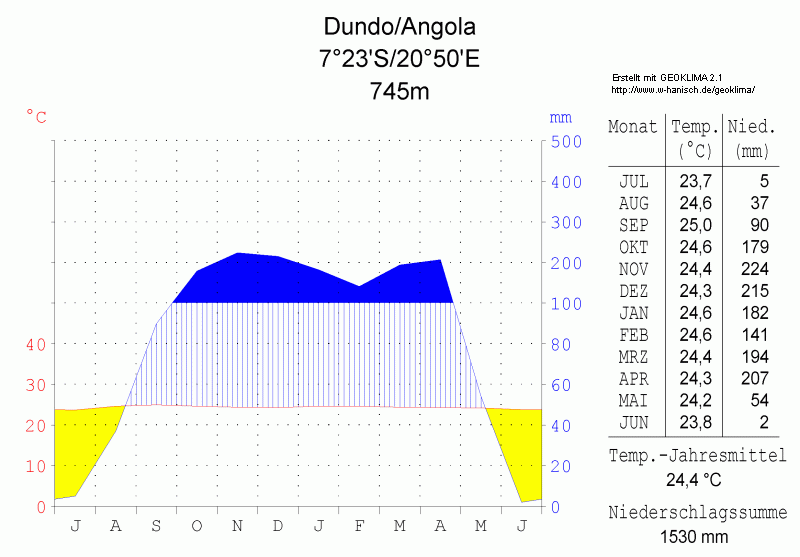
Climate chart in the format by Walther and Lieth
