= Quatro de Fevereiro Airport =

Quatro de Fevereiro International Airport Aeroporto Internacional 4 de Fevereiro
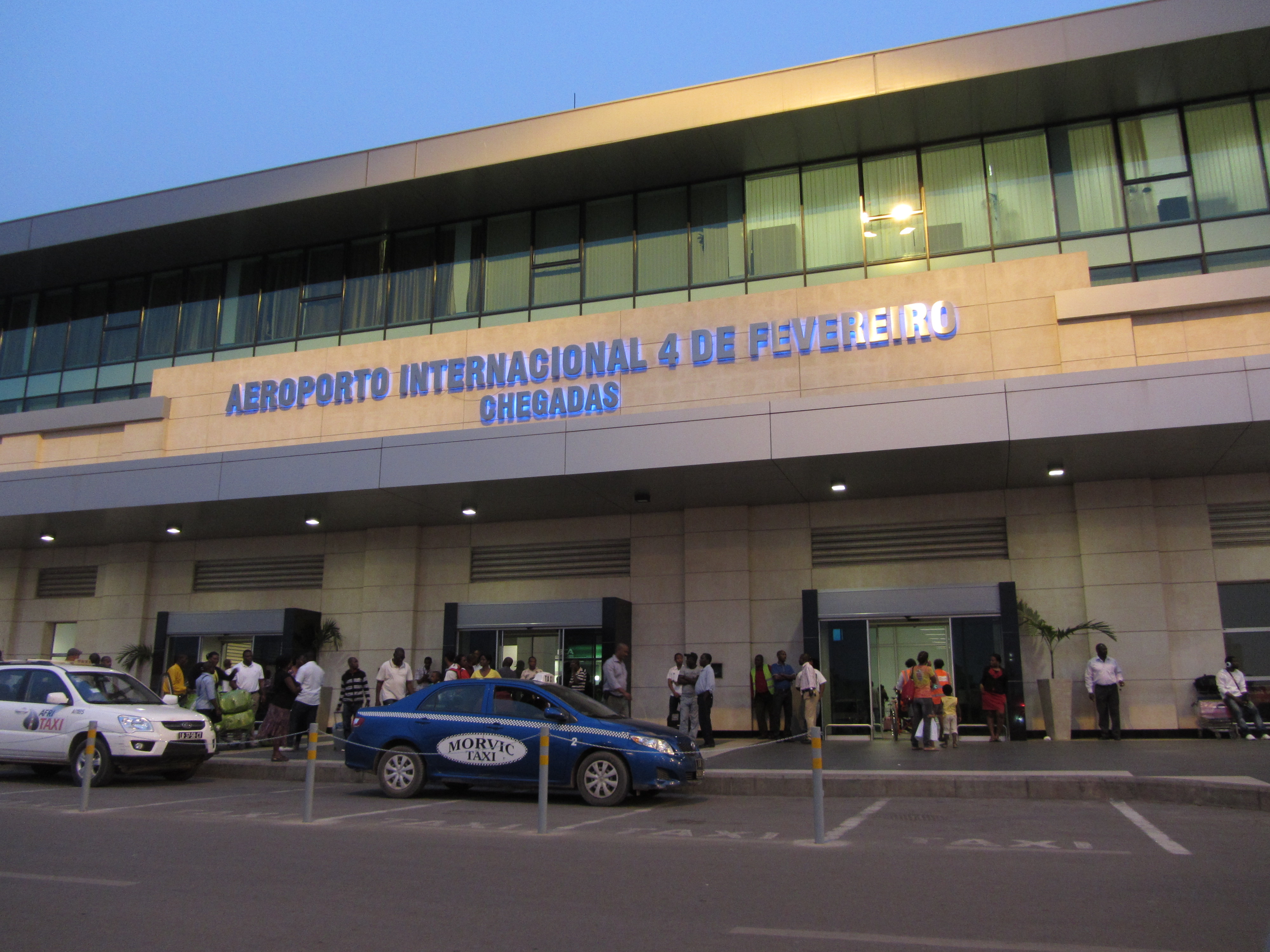
- IATA: LAD; ICAO: FNLU

Summary
- Airport type: Private
- Operator: ENANA EP
- Location: Luanda, Angola
- Hub for: Fly Angola
- Elevation AMSL: 243 ft (74 m)
- Coordinates: 08°51′30″S 13°13′52″E
- Website: www.aeroporto-luanda.com

Map
- Location of Airport in Angola LAD (Africa)

Runways
Direction	Length		Surface
Direction	m	ft	Surface
05/23	3,716	12,190	Asphalt
07/25	2,600	8,530	Asphalt

Statistics (2018)
- Passengers: 5,600,000
- Passenger change 18–19: ▲9.4%
- Aircraft movements: 65,843
- Movements change 18–19: ▼1.8%

Quatro de Fevereiro International Airport (Portuguese: Aeroporto Internacional 4 de Fevereiro), (IATA: LAD, ICAO: FNLU) is the old international airport of Luanda, in Angola. It is located in the southern part of the city, situated in the Luanda Province. Quatro de Fevereiro means "4th February", which is an important national holiday in Angola, marking the start of the armed struggle against the Portuguese colonial regime on 4 February 1961. In 2018, about 5.6 million passengers were handled. It was closed to all commercial flights on 1 March 2026, replaced by Dr. António Agostinho Neto International Airport, located 40 km south of Luanda.

== History ==
The construction of the airport began in 1951, in order to serve the capital of the former Portuguese Overseas Province of Angola. It was inaugurated in 1954, by the Portuguese President Craveiro Lopes, which in his honor, the airport was named Aeroporto Presidente Craveiro Lopes (President Craveiro Lopes Airport).

In August, September, and October 1975 the airport hosted tens of thousands of mostly white Portuguese Angolans fleeing to Lisbon (during Operation Air Bridge) who camped out while awaiting evacuation flights during the weeks before Angola's Independence.

Following Angola's independence from Portugal (in November 1975), in 1976 the airport was renamed Aeroporto Quatro de Fevereiro Internacional (Fourth of February International Airport) to commemorate the events leading to the independence of the state.

In March 2026, all airline operations were transferred to the new airport Dr. Antonio Agostinho Neto International Airport.

== Facilities ==
The airport is at an elevation of 243 feet (74 m) above mean sea level. It has two asphalt paved runways: 05/23 is 3,716 by 45 metres (12,192 ft × 148 ft) and 07/25 is 2,600 by 60 metres (8,530 ft × 197 ft).

== Statistics ==
Traffic by calendar year. Official ACI Statistics
	Passengers	Change from previous year	Aircraft operations	Change from previous year	Cargo (metric tons)	Change from previous year
2005	882,749	▲18.15%	28,382	▲17.31%	19,975	▲23.35%
2006	1,128,442	▲27.83%	22,213	▼21.74%	33,876	▲69.59%
2007	N.A.	N.A.	N.A.	N.A.	N.A.	N.A.
2008	2,222,638	N.A.	68,000	N.A.	42,614	N.A.
2009	2,430,794	▲9.37%	65,843	▼3.17%	53,339	▲25.17%
Source: Airports Council International. World Airport Traffic Statistics (Years 2005-2009)

== Accidents and incidents ==
- On 26 March 1979, a cargo-configured Interflug Ilyushin Il-18 DM-STL overshot the runway following an engine failure during the take-off run. The aircraft broke up and erupted into flames, killing the ten people on board.
- On 12 February 2000, a Transafrik International cargo Boeing 727 crashed upon landing on runway 23. Due to high winds gusting to between 50 and 80 knots, the aircraft had executed a missed approach, and upon the landing flare of the second attempt, witnesses saw the right wing touch the ground.
- On 25 May 2003, a Boeing 727-223 with the registration number N844AA, which had been parked at the airport for over a year, was stolen in mysterious circumstances. As of January 2025, the aircraft has not been located.
- On 27 June 2009, a British Airways Boeing 777-200ER G-RAES was damaged, while it was parked, by a collision with a Hainan Airlines Airbus A340-600 B-6510.
- On 31 January 2010, Guicango Yakovlev Yak-40 D2-FES suffered the collapse of all landing gears on landing after a flight from Cabinda.
