= Dr. António Agostinho Neto International Airport =

Airport in Luanda, Angola

Dr. Antonio Agostinho Neto International Airport Aeroporto Internacional Dr. António Agostinho Neto (Portuguese)
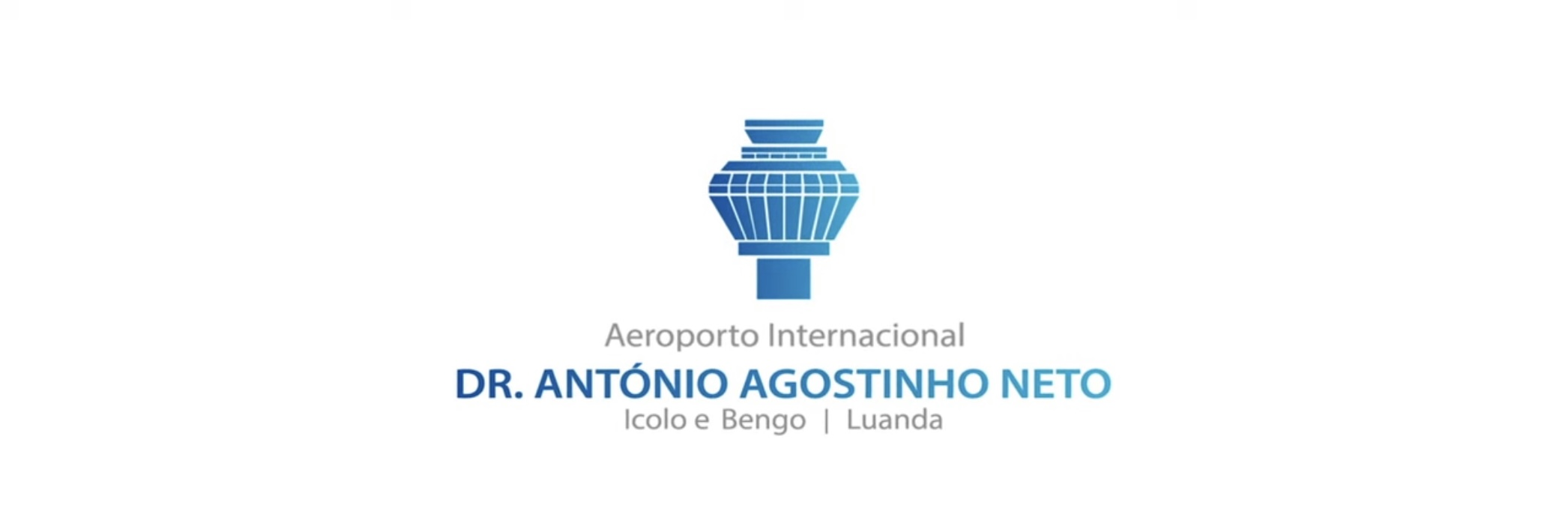

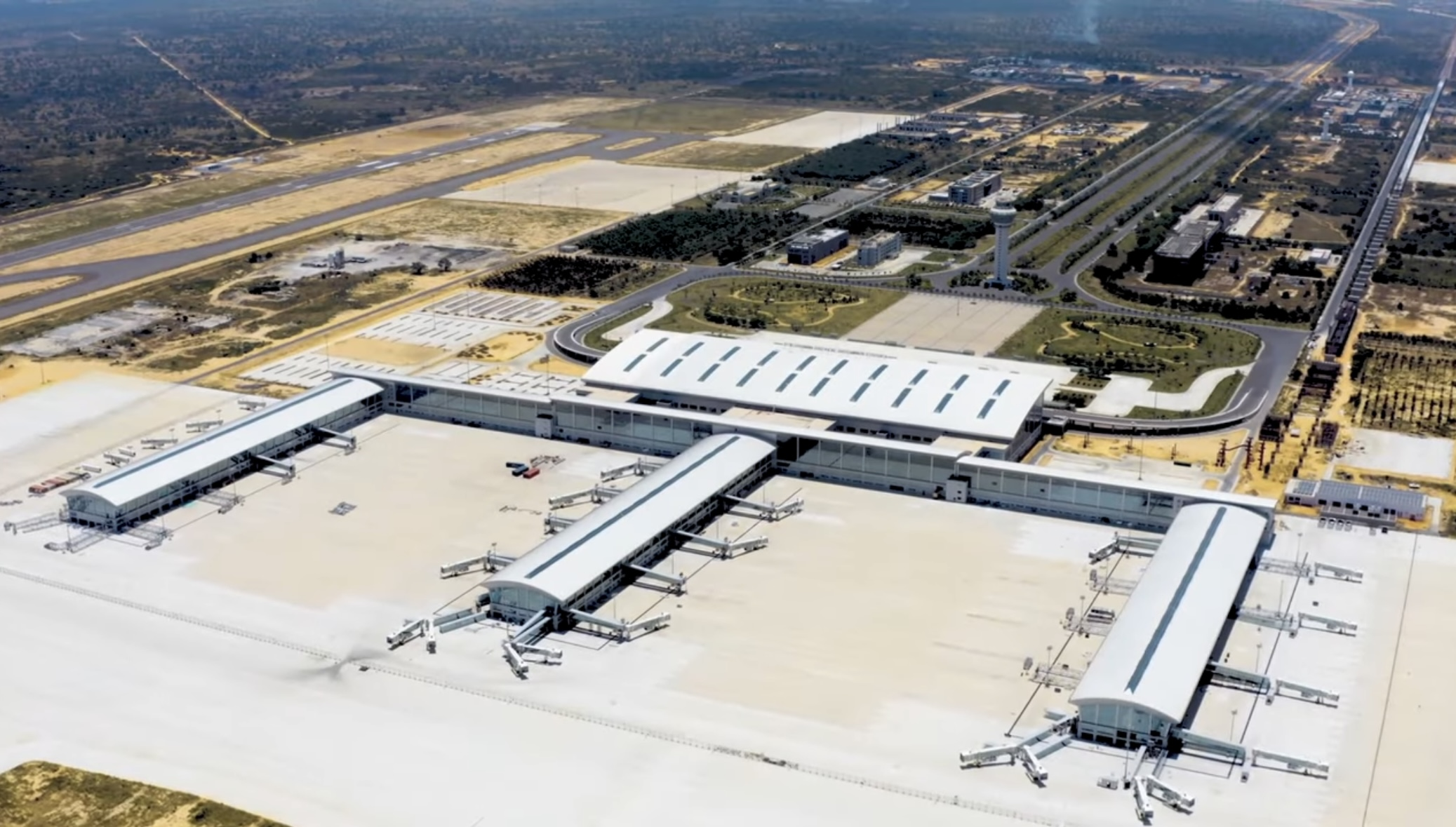
- IATA: NBJ; ICAO: FNBJ

Summary
- Airport type: Public
- Owner: Government of Angola
- Operator: Empresa Nacional de Exploração de Aeroportos e Navegação Aérea (ENANA)
- Serves: Luanda
- Location: Bom Jesus, Icolo e Bengo Province, Angola
- Hub for: TAAG Angola Airlines
- Elevation AMSL: 522 ft (159 m)
- Coordinates: 9°2′48.4″S 13°30′25.9″E
- Interactive map of Dr. Antonio Agostinho Neto International Airport

Runways
Direction	Length		Surface
Direction	ft	m	Surface
06L/24R	12,467	3,800	Asphalt
06R/24L	13,123	4,000	Asphalt/Concrete
- Source: aerobaticsweb.org

Dr. António Agostinho Neto International Airport (Portuguese: Aeroporto Internacional Dr. António Agostinho Neto) (IATA: NBJ, ICAO: FNBJ), informally Novo Aeroporto Internacional de Luanda (NAIL), is the international airport serving Luanda, the capital of Angola. In March 2026, the transfer of scheduled passenger airline operations from the old Quatro de Fevereiro International Airport was completed. It is located in the municipality of Bom Jesus in Icolo e Bengo Province, 40 km (25 miles) south-east of Luanda city center. It is named after Agostinho Neto, the first president of Angola.

It is the largest airport ever constructed by any Chinese enterprise outside of China. It is intended to be Angola's main gateway to the world and an important air hub for Africa, having been designed for 15 million passengers annually and 130,000 metric tons of cargo. The five busiest airports in Africa handle 7.5–28 million passengers per year, of which three have direct flights from Luanda. The older Luanda airport, Quatro de Fevereiro served 5.6 million in 2018.

== History ==
The site was selected in 2004 and construction began in mid-2006. The original date for completion was 2012. Construction costs, which were to be financed largely by China, were estimated in 2015 at US$3.8 billion. Reporting in 2024 indicates the project started in 2005, with construction beginning in 2013. The project was led first by China International Fund in conjunction with the Brazilian company Odebrecht until 2019, then by Aviation Industry Corporation of China. The original contract was terminated in 2017 and a new contract issued in 2020.

The airport was officially inaugurated on 10 November 2023. Domestic passenger flights were planned to begin in February 2024 and international passenger services in June 2024. Flight operations began slowly, however, as the first cargo flight was on 19 December 2023, and only 32 cargo flights were completed by 20 February 2024. During the 30 days ending 9 August 2024, fewer than ten flights were recorded. By early April 2024, the target date to shift all operations to the new airport was the end of 2024. TAAG Angola Airlines later planned to move their hub progressively to Dr. António Agostinho Neto International Airport until the end of the first quarter of 2025.

The first passenger flight connection at the new airport was launched on 10 November 2024. By 18 December 2024, an average of four flight departures per day was recorded. By 17 April 2025, an average of 11 flight departures per day was recorded, all by TAAG Angola Airlines and nearly all to Angolan destinations. TAAG transferred its international services in October 2025, and other airlines gradually followed. By 5 January 2026, average daily departures rose to 19, while departures from the previous airport declined to 2.

== Facilities ==
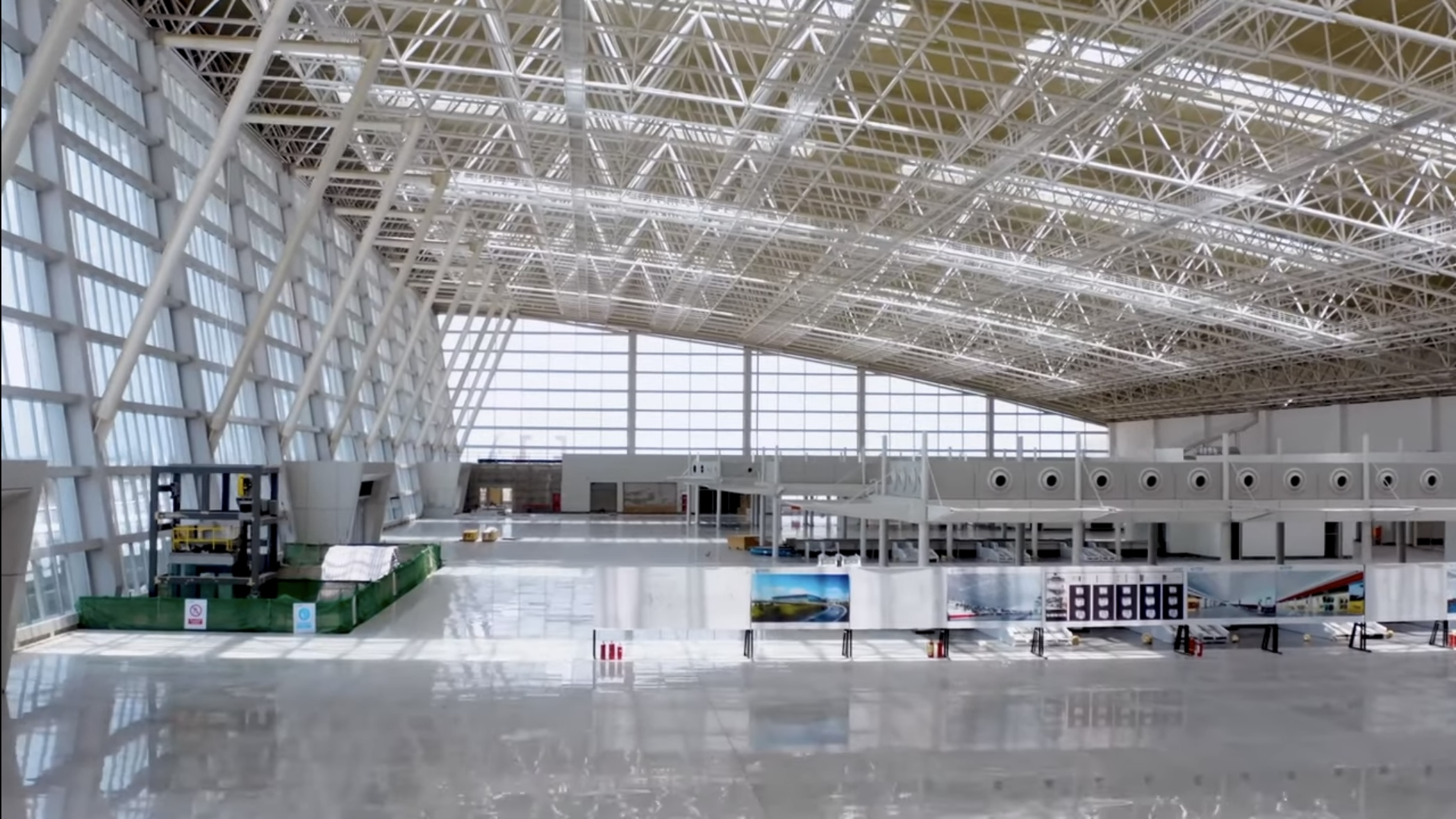
Check-in hall

The facility has a total area of 43 hectares (0.43 km^{2}; 110 acres), consisting of two modern runways and three terminal buildings.

=== Runways ===
The airport has two parallel runways, located 2.2 km (1.4 miles) from each other. The first runway is 4,000 m × 60 m (13,120 ft × 200 ft). The second runway is 3,800 m × 60 m (12,470 ft × 200 ft). Only one runway was in active use as of December 2025.

== Airlines and destinations ==
=== Passenger ===
The following airlines operate regular scheduled and charter flights at Dr. António Agostinho Neto International Airport:

Airlines	Destinations
Air Algérie	Algiers
Air France	Paris–Charles de Gaulle
Airlink	Johannesburg–O. R. Tambo
ASKY Airlines	Lomé
Emirates	Dubai–International
Ethiopian Airlines	Addis Ababa
Lufthansa	Frankfurt
Qatar Airways	Doha
Royal Air Maroc	Casablanca
TAAG Angola Airlines	Abidjan, Brazzaville, Cabinda, Cape Town, Dakar–Diass, Guangzhou, Havana, Johannesburg–O. R. Tambo, Kinshasa–N'djili, Lagos, Lisbon, Maputo, Nairobi–Jomo Kenyatta, Praia, São Paulo–Guarulhos, São Tomé, Windhoek–Hosea Kutako; Seasonal: Porto
TAP Air Portugal	Lisbon, Porto
