= Transport in Angola =

Transport in Angola comprises:

== Roads ==
Two trans-African automobile routes pass through Angola:

- the Tripoli-Cape Town Highway
- the Beira-Lobito Highway

Luanda is the hub of the country's growing network of closed access highways. The city's ring road is known as the Fidel Castro Expressway.

Road transport in Angola.

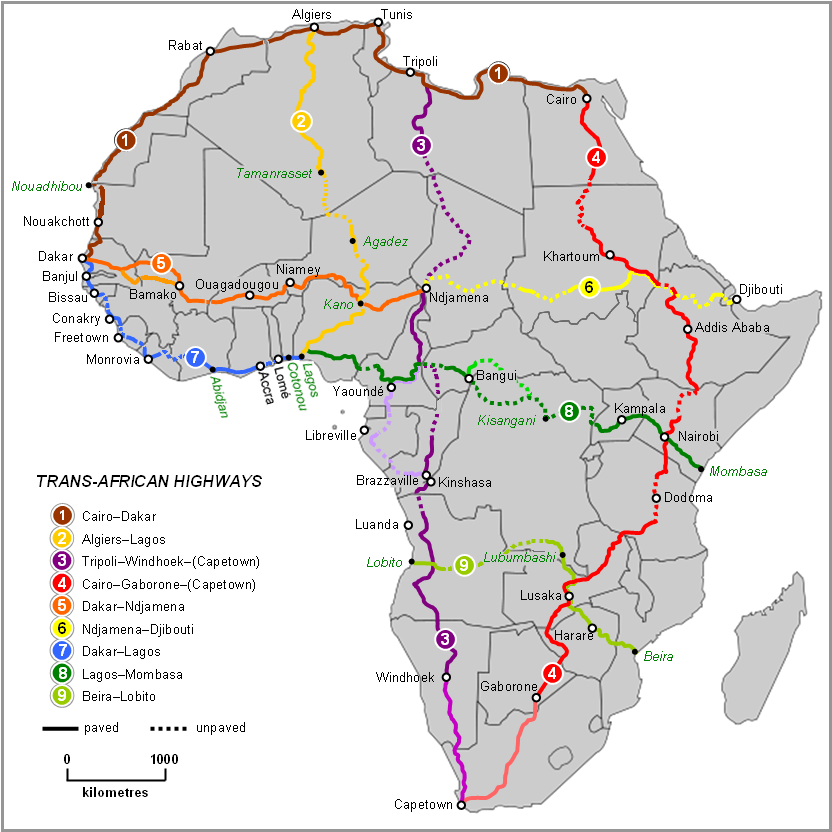
Map of Trans-African Highways.

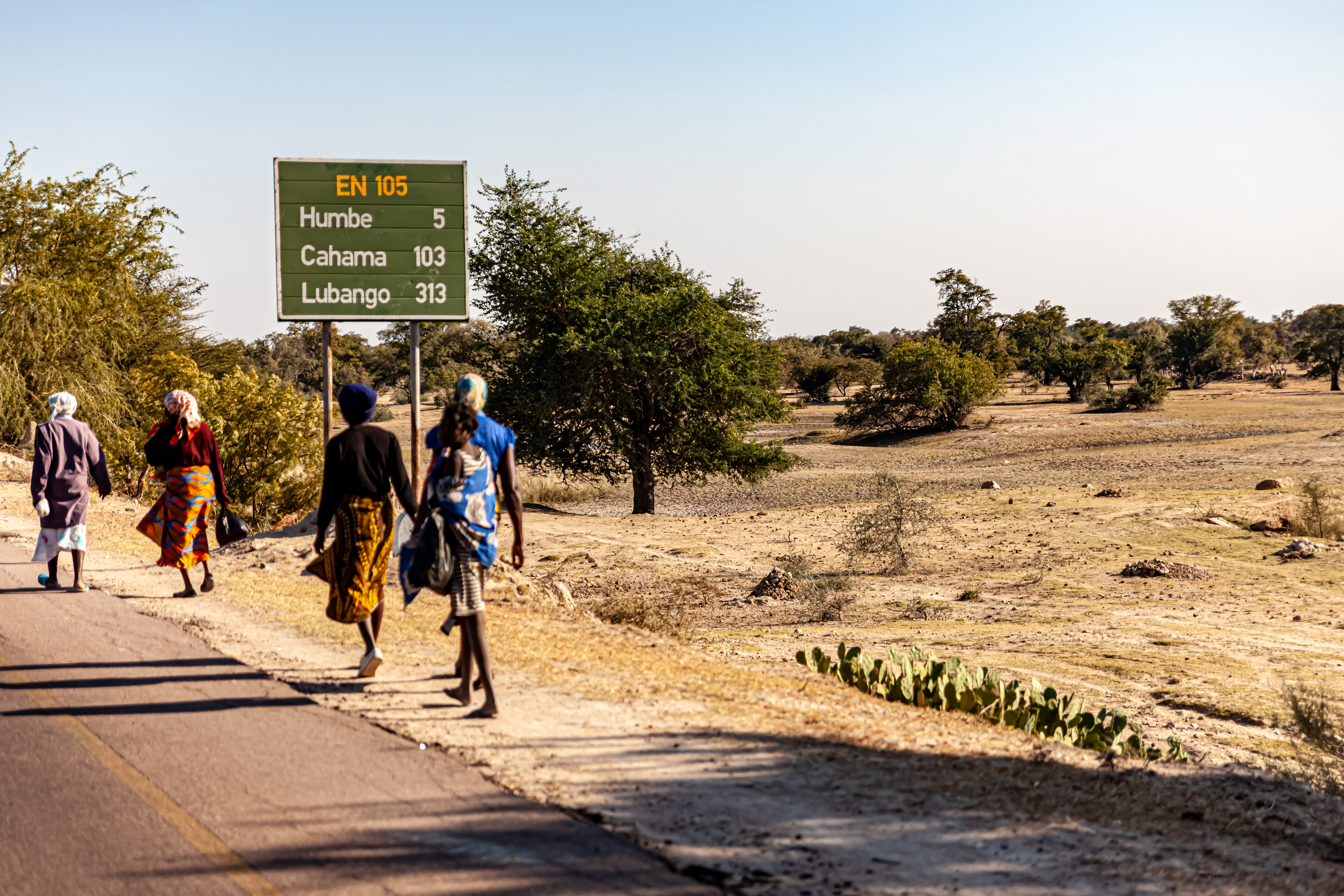
Walking home on EN 105.

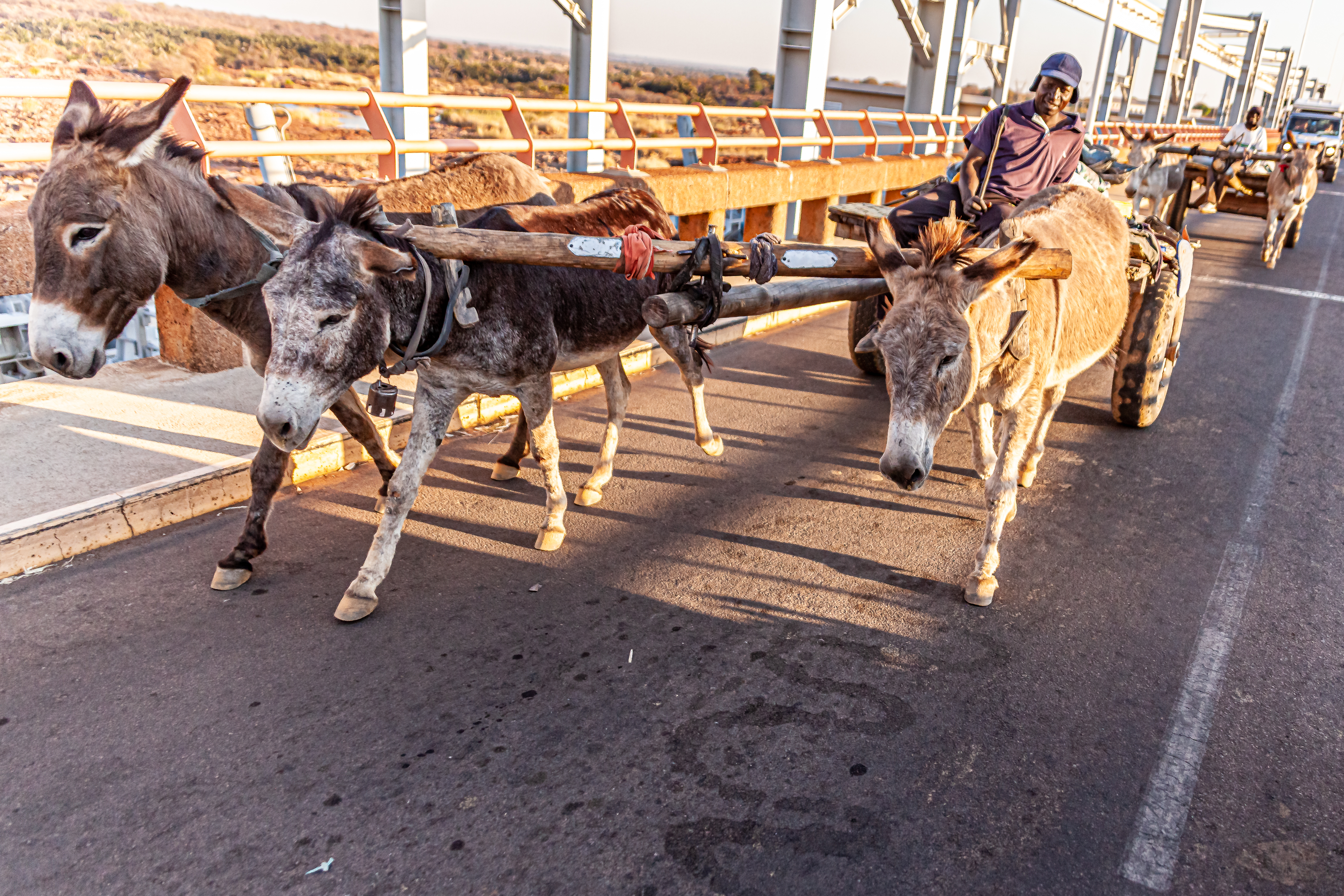
Donkey-drawn carts.

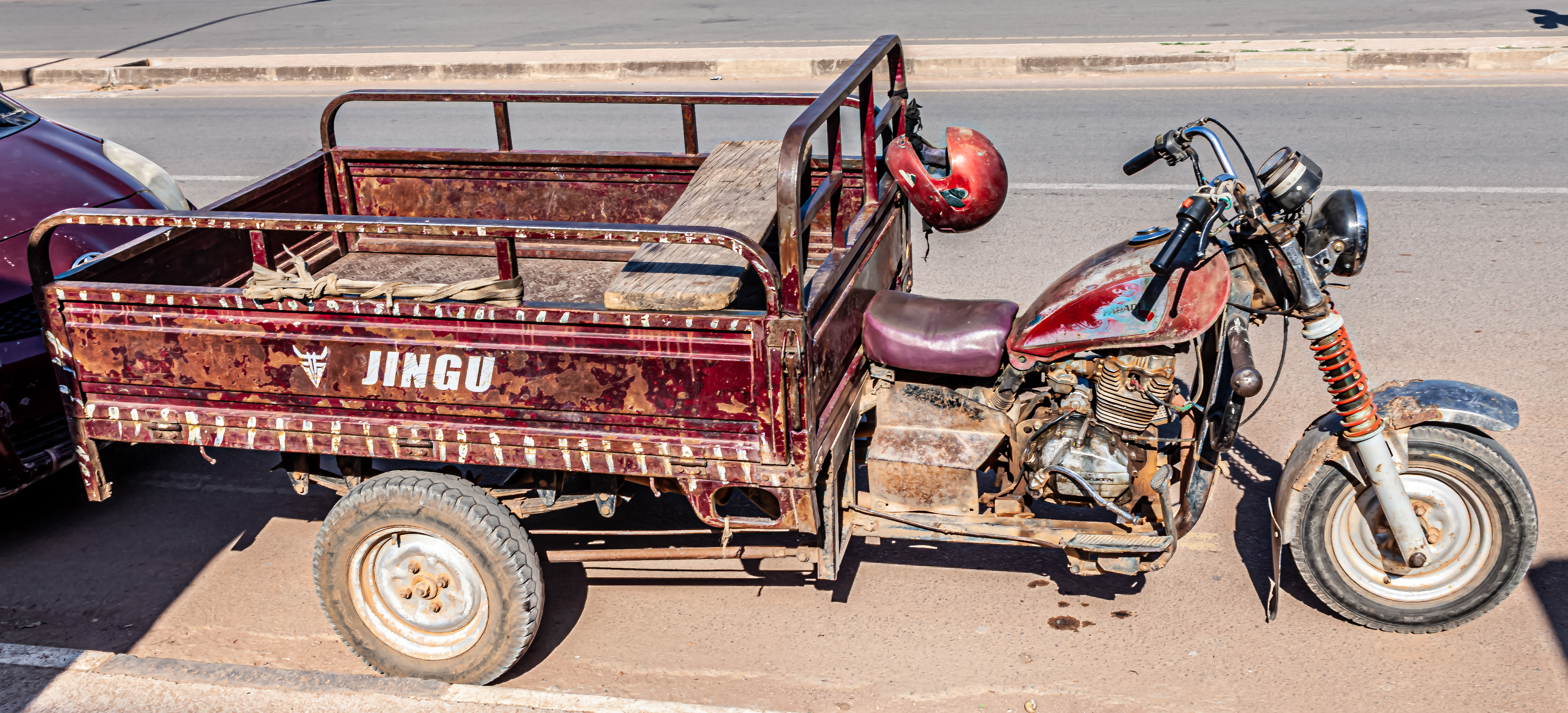
Three-wheeled motorcycles.

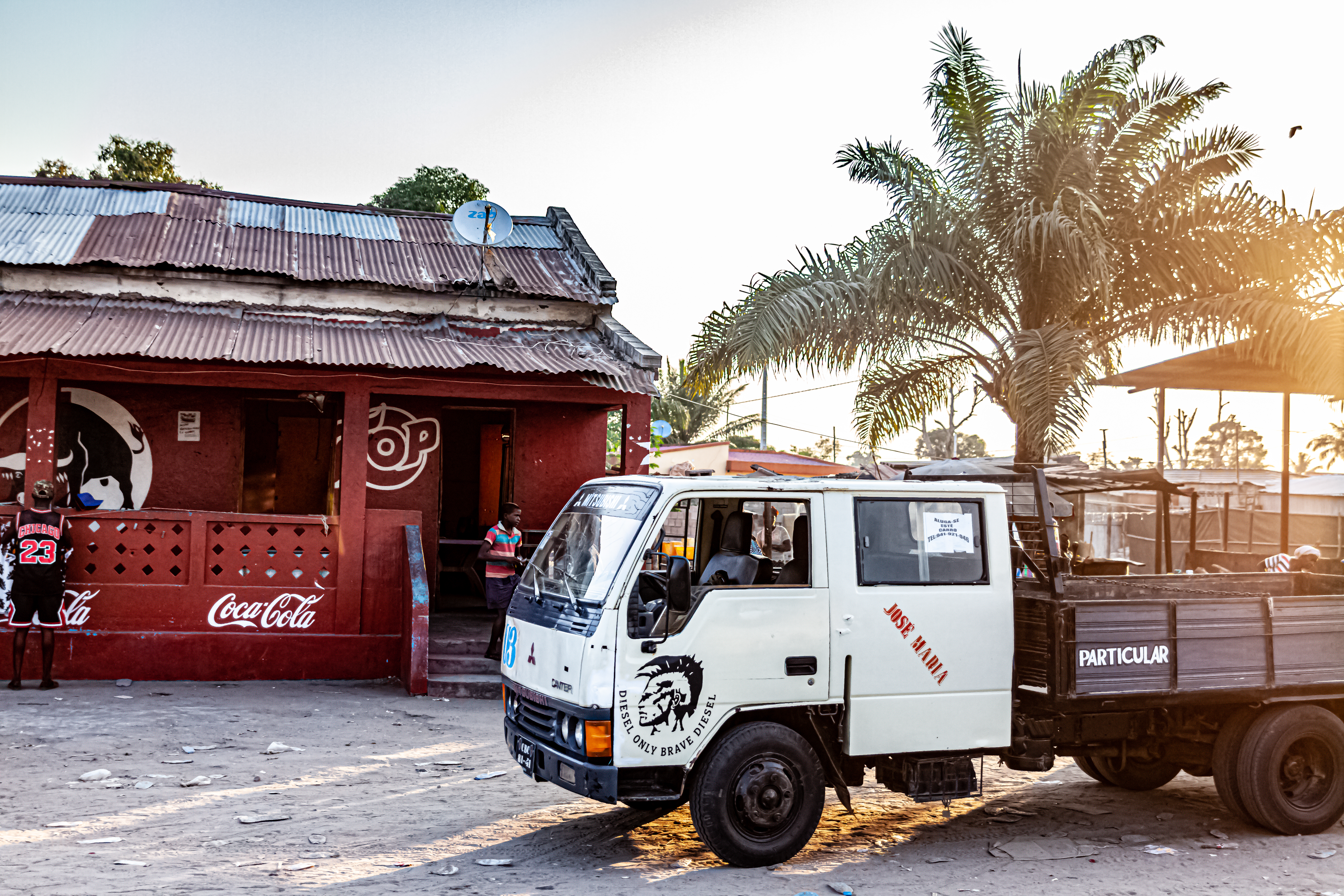
Trucks.

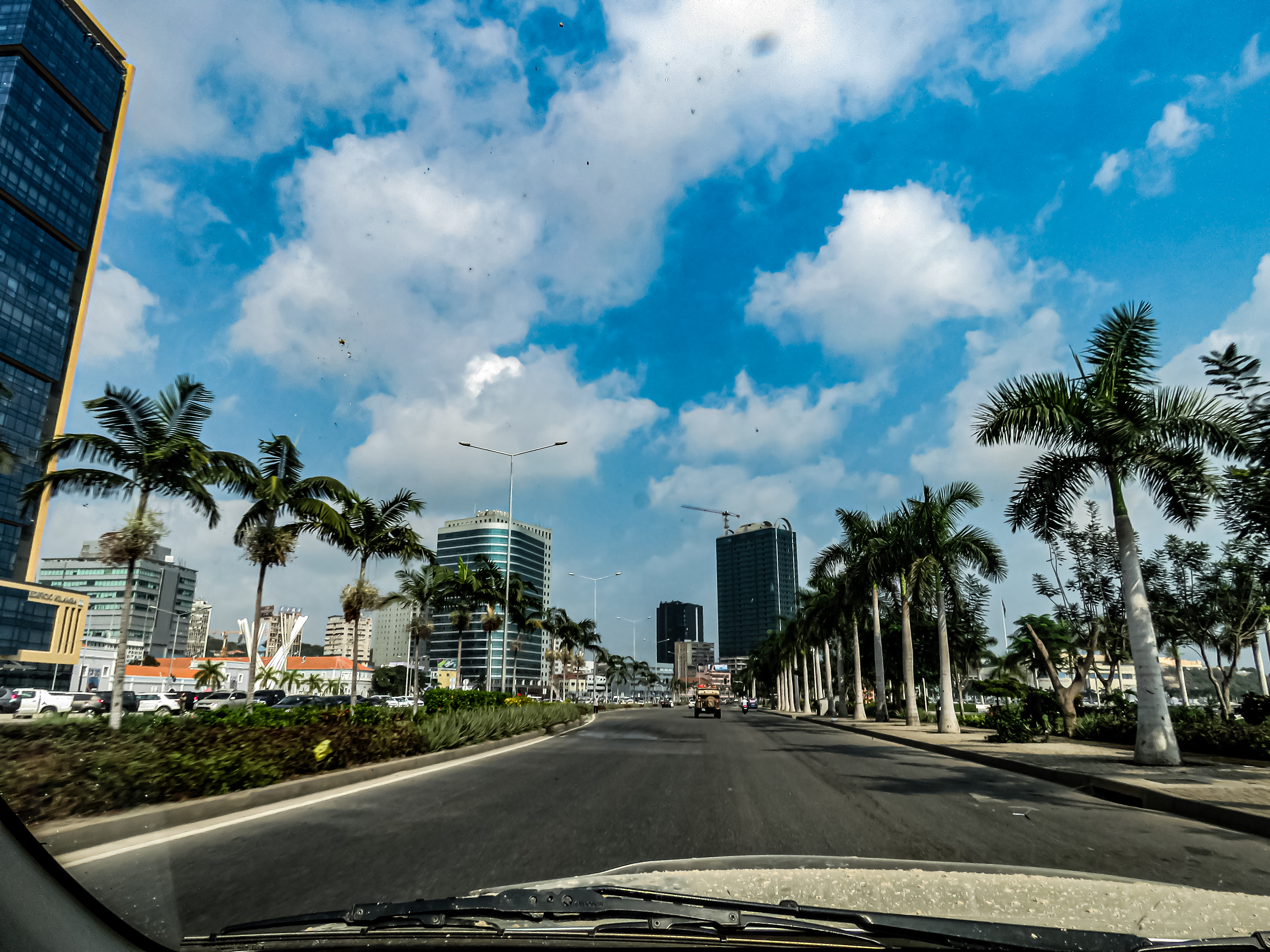
Automobiles in Luanda.

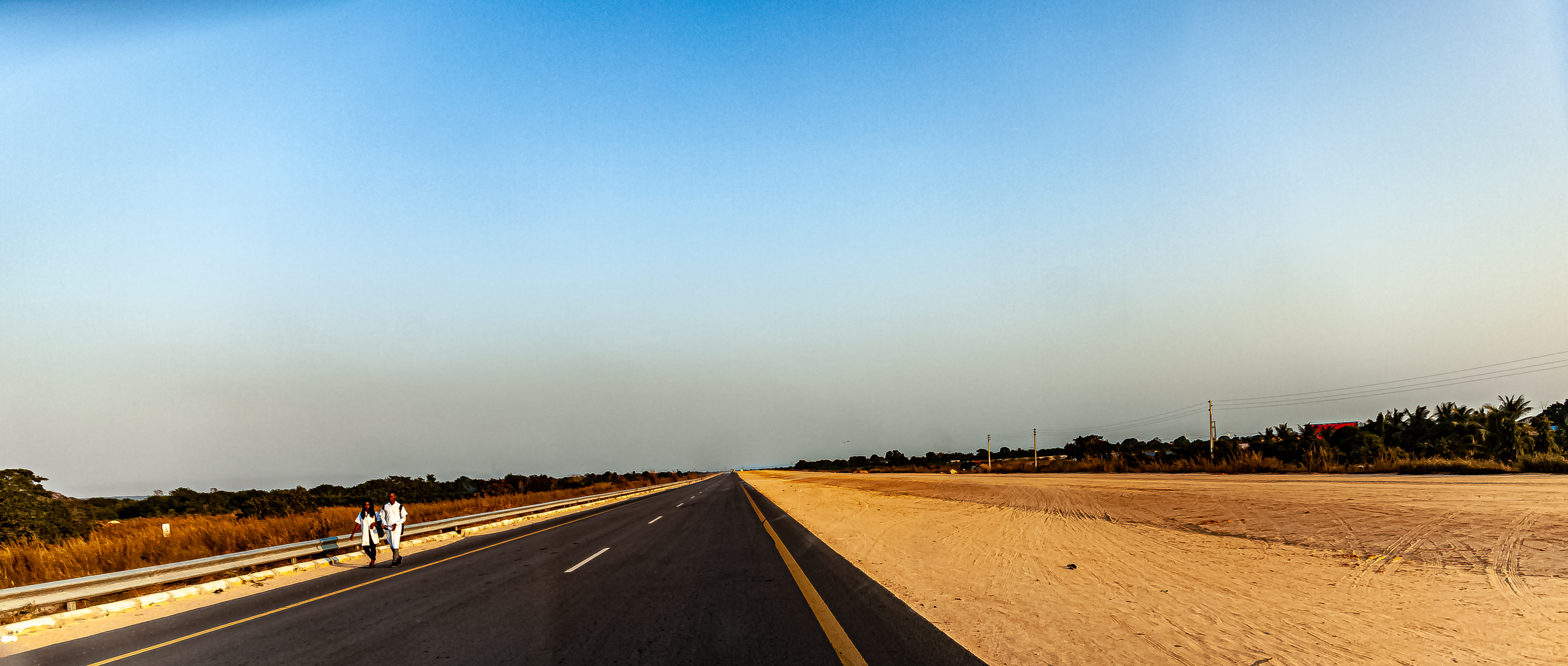
New highway (2019).

== Railways ==
There are three separate railway lines in Angola:

- Luanda Railway (CFL) (northern);
- Benguela Railway (CFB) (central), operated by the Lobito Atlantic Railway joint venture;
- Moçâmedes Railway (CFM) (southern);

Reconstruction of these three lines began in 2005 and they are now all operational. The Benguela Railway connects to the Democratic Republic of the Congo.

== Waterways ==
- 1,300 km navigable (2008)

country comparison to the world: 36

== Pipelines ==
- gas 352 km; liquid petroleum gas 85 km; crude oil 1,065 km (2013)

In April 2012, the Zambian Development Agency (ZDA) and an Angolan company signed a memorandum of understanding (MoU) to build a multi-product pipeline from Lobito to Lusaka, Zambia, to deliver various refined products to Zambia.

Angola plans to build an oil refinery in Lobito in the coming years.

== Ports and harbors ==
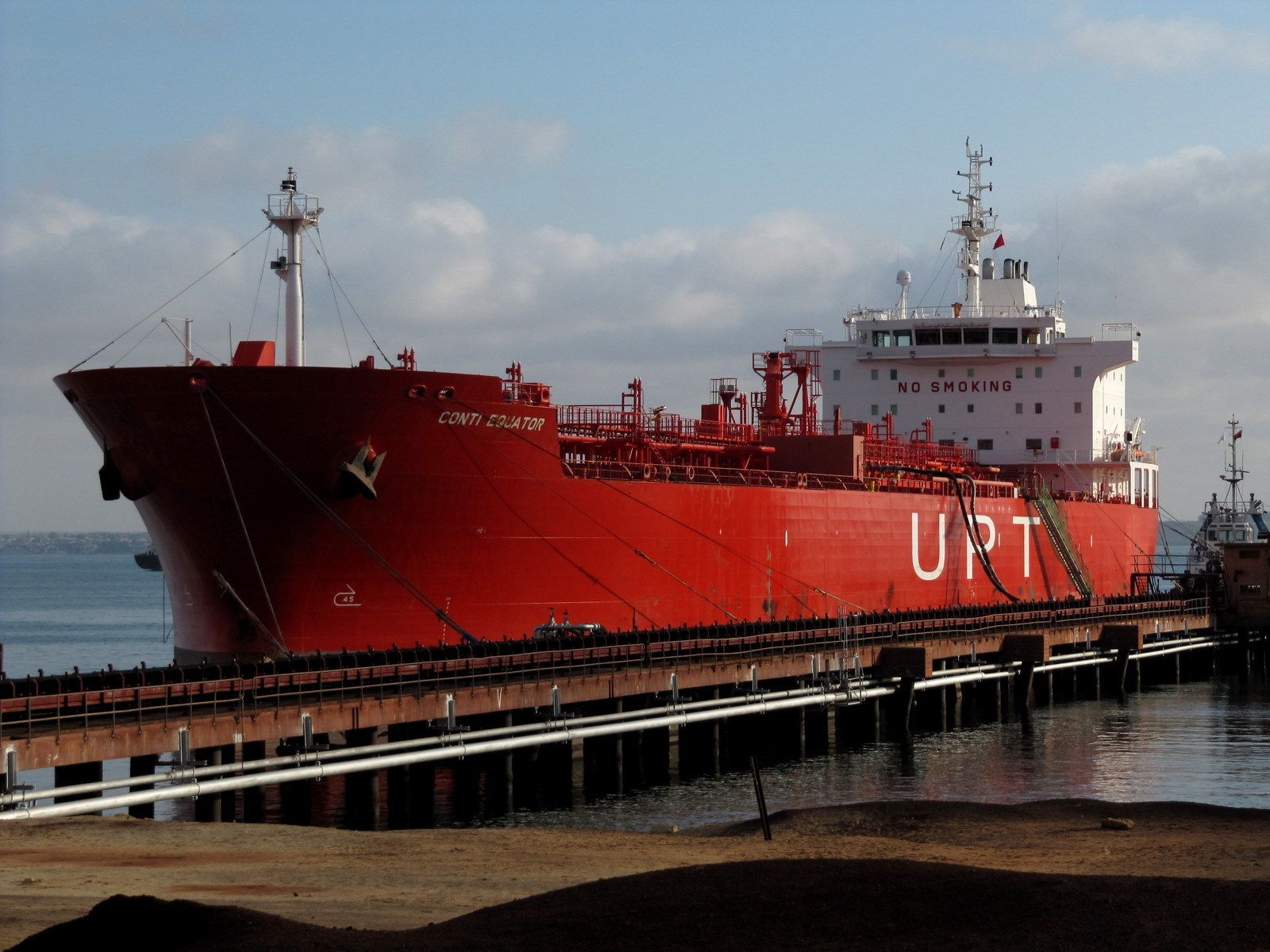
Ship loading minerals at Moçâmedes harbour, Angola

The government plans to build a deep-water port at Barra do Dande, north of Luanda, in Bengo province near Caxito.

Shipments bound for Angolan ports require a loading certificate (Certificado de Embarque), also known as an ARC, waiver or CNCA certificate, issued in the country of origin by an agent authorised by the National Council of Angolan Shippers (CNCA). It is one of the documents required for importation into Angola, together with the commercial invoice, the customs import declaration (Documento Único), the declaration of customs value, an import licence from the Ministry of Industry and Trade, a packing list, terminal handling receipts and a SOLAS certificate.

== Merchant marine ==
- total: 58

country comparison to the world: 115

- by type: cargo 13, oil tanker 8, other 37 (2008)

== Airports ==
- 102 (2021)

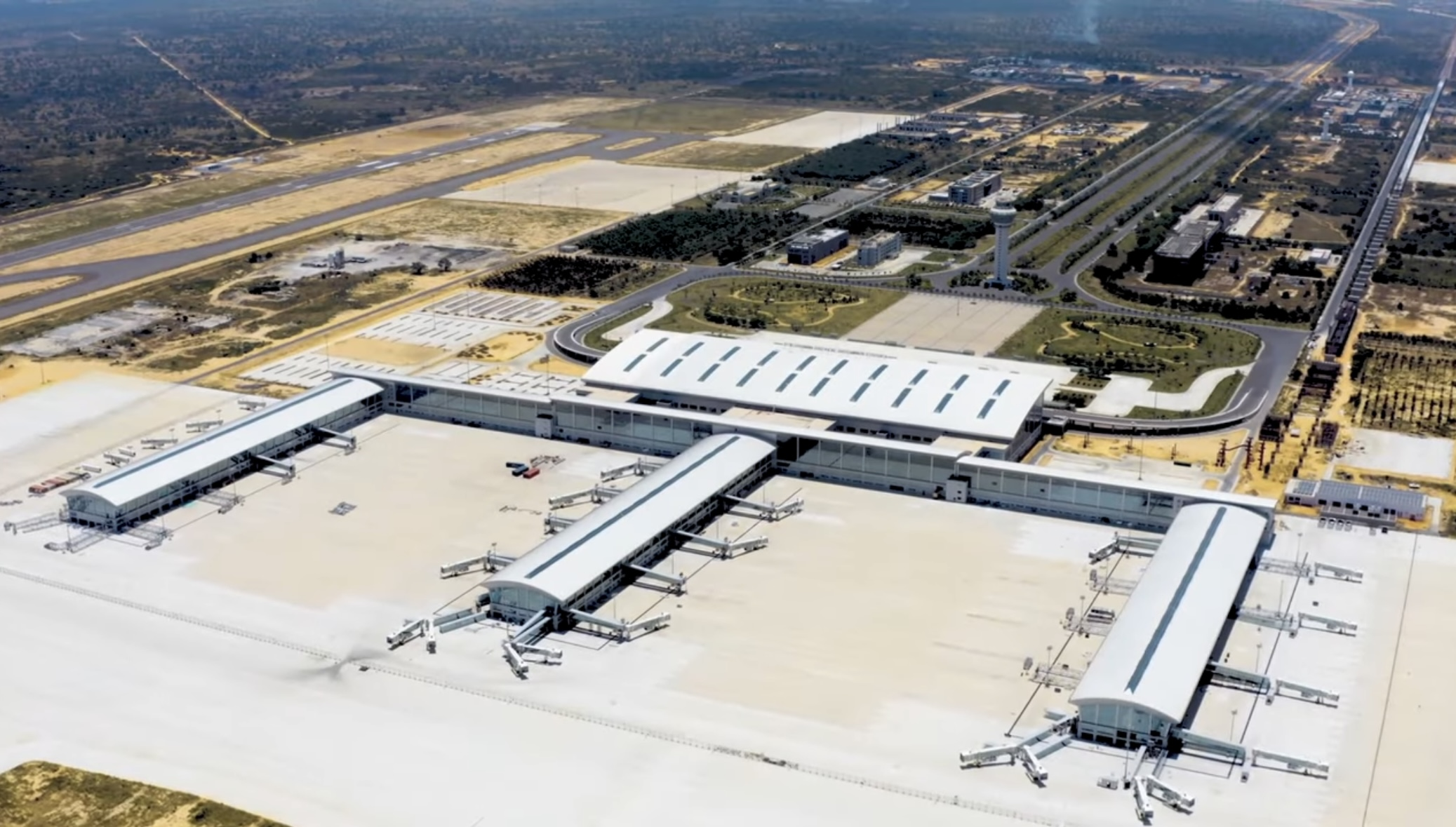
Dr. Antonio Agostinho Neto International Airport

The old airport in Luanda, Quatro de Fevereiro Airport, will be replaced by the new Dr. Antonio Agostinho Neto International Airport.

=== Airports – with paved runways ===
- total: 30
- over 3,047 m: 5
- 2,438 to 3,047 m: 8
- 1,524 to 2,437 m: 12
- 914 to 1,523 m: 4
- under 914 m: 1 (2008)

=== Airports – with unpaved runways ===
- total: 181 (2008)
- over 3,047 m: 2
- 2,438 to 3,047 m: 5
- 1,524 to 2,437 m: 32
- 914 to 1,523 m: 100
- under 914 m: 42 (2008)

=== Angolan Airlines ===
- TAAG Angola Airlines
- Sonair
- Fly Angola

=== Heliports ===
- total: 1 (2021)
