= IATA airport code =

Three-letter air-travel designation for airports and cities

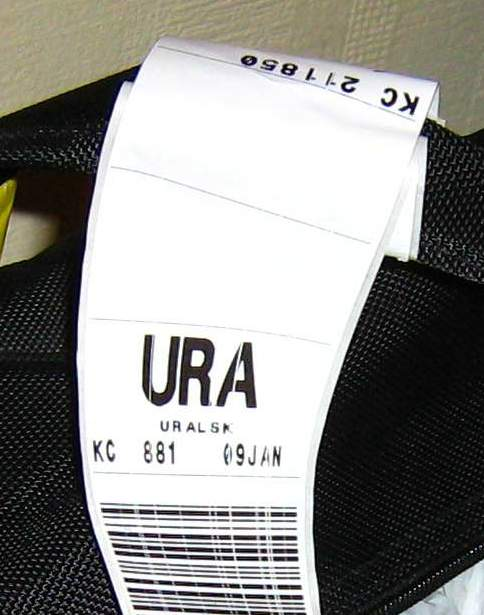
A baggage tag for a flight heading to Oral Ak Zhol Airport, whose IATA airport code is "URA"

An IATA airport code, also known as an IATA location identifier, IATA station code, or simply a location identifier, is a unique three-letter geocode designating many airports, cities (with one or more airports) and metropolitan areas (cities with more than one airport) around the world, defined by the International Air Transport Association (IATA). The characters prominently displayed on baggage tags attached at airport check-in desks are an example of a way these codes are used.

The assignment of these codes is governed by IATA Resolution 763, and it is administered by the IATA's headquarters in Montreal, Canada. The codes are published semi-annually in the IATA Airline Coding Directory. Alphabetical lists of airports sorted by IATA code are available.

IATA also provides codes for airport handling entities and for certain railway stations, bus stations and ferry ports. A list of railway station codes, shared in agreements between airlines and rail lines such as Amtrak, SNCF, and Deutsche Bahn, is available. However, many railway administrations have their own list of codes for their stations, such as Amtrak station codes.

== History ==
Airport codes arose out of the convenience that the practice brought pilots for location identification in the 1930s. Initially, pilots in the United States used the two-letter code from the National Weather Service (NWS) for identifying cities. This system became unmanageable for cities and towns without an NWS identifier, and the use of two letters allowed only a few hundred combinations; a three-letter system of airport codes was implemented. This system allowed for 17,576 permutations, assuming all letters can be used in conjunction with each other.

In the early days of aviation, airport codes frequently adopted (or were required to comply with) the naming conventions previously established by weather stations, railway stations, and other commercial or governmental outposts that communicated by radio or telegraph. The code names for those stations, which usually predated the use of two-way radio and even radiotelephony itself, reflected the need for terse, standardized signalling patterns that could be easily transmitted and correctly received via radiotelegraphy and Morse code.

== Naming conventions ==
=== National policies ===
==== Canada ====
Canada's unusual codes, which bear little to no similarity with any conventional abbreviation to the city's name (such as YUL in Montréal and YYZ in Toronto), originated from the two-letter codes used to identify weather reporting stations in the 1930s. The letters preceding the two-letter code follow the following format:

- Y – for "Yes", this letter was used when the station shared its location with an airport.
- W – for "Without", when the weather-reporting station did not share its location with an airport.
- U – used when the station was located together with a non-directional beacon (NDB).
- X – suggesting that the last two letters of a code were already in use by a Canadian airport.
- Z – indicated that an airport code had been used for the identification of an airport in the U.S.

Most large airports in Canada have codes that begin with the letter "Y", although not all "Y" codes are Canadian (for example, YUM for Yuma, Arizona, and YNT for Yantai, China), and not all Canadian airports start with the letter "Y" (for example, ZBF for Bathurst, New Brunswick). Many Canadian airports have a code that starts with W, X or Z, but none of these are major airports. When the Canadian transcontinental railways were built, each station was assigned its own two-letter Morse code:

- VR for Vancouver
- TZ for Toronto
- QB for Quebec City
- WG for Winnipeg
- SJ for Saint John
- YC for Calgary
- OW for Ottawa
- EG for Edmonton

When the Canadian government established airports, it used the existing railway codes for them as well. If the airport had a weather station, authorities added a "Y" to the front of the code, meaning "Yes" to indicate it had a weather station or some other letter to indicate it did not. When international codes were created in cooperation with the United States, because "Y" was seldom used in the United States, Canada simply used the weather station codes for its airports, changing the "Y" to a "Z" if it conflicted with an airport code already in use. The result is that most major Canadian airport codes start with "Y" followed by two letters in the city's name, based on the transcontinental railroad two-letter Morse code, as mentioned above (for example, YOW for Ottawa, YWG for Winnipeg, YYC for Calgary, or YVR for Vancouver), whereas other Canadian airports append the two-letter code of the radio beacons that were the closest to the actual airport, such as YQX in Gander or YXS in Prince George.

Four of the ten provincial capital airports in Canada have ended up with codes beginning with YY, including:

- YYZ for Toronto, Ontario
- YYJ for Victoria, British Columbia
- YYT for St. John's, Newfoundland and Labrador
- YYG for Charlottetown, Prince Edward Island

Canada's largest airport is YYZ for Toronto Pearson (as YTZ was already allocated to Billy Bishop Toronto City Airport, the airport was given the station code of Malton, Mississauga, where it is located). YUL is used for Montréal–Trudeau (UL was the ID code for the beacon in the city of Kirkland). While these codes make it difficult for the public to associate them with a particular Canadian city, some codes have become popular in usage despite their cryptic nature, particularly at the largest airports. Toronto's code has entered pop culture in the form of "YYZ", a song by the rock band Rush, which utilizes the Morse code signal as a musical motif. Some airports have started using their IATA codes as brand names, such as Calgary International Airport (YYC) and Vancouver International Airport (YVR).

==== New Zealand ====
Several New Zealand airports use codes that contain the letter Z, to distinguish them from similar airport names in other countries. Some examples are HLZ for Hamilton, ZQN for Queenstown, and WSZ for Westport.

==== United States ====
Since the United States Navy reserved "N" codes, and to prevent confusion with Federal Communications Commission broadcast call signs, which begin with "W" or "K", the airports of certain U.S. cities whose name begins with one of these letters had to adopt "irregular" airport codes:

- APC for Napa, California
- ASH for Nashua, New Hampshire (at Boire Field)
- BNA for Nashville, Tennessee (whose airport's original name was Berry Field)
- EWR for Newark, New Jersey
- EYW for Key West, Florida
- HVN for New Haven, Connecticut
- ILM for Wilmington, North Carolina
- MCI for Kansas City, Missouri (whose airport's original name was Mid-Continent International Airport)
- MSY for New Orleans, Louisiana (named for the Moisant Stock Yards previously on the airport's site)
- OME for Nome, Alaska
- ORF for Norfolk, Virginia

This practice is not followed outside the United States:

- Kuala Lumpur, Malaysia is KUL
- Naples, Italy is NAP
- Nassau, The Bahamas is NAS
- Warsaw, Poland is WAW

In addition, since three letter codes starting with Q are widely used in radio communication, cities whose name begins with "Q" also had to find alternate codes, as in the case of:

- Qiqihar, China (NDG)
- Qianjiang, Chongqing, China (JIQ)
- Quzhou, China (JUZ)
- Quetta, Pakistan (UET)
- Quito, Ecuador (UIO)
- Quimper, France (UIP)

Even this practice is not followed universally. For instance Owerri in Nigeria uses the code QOW.

IATA codes should not be confused with the FAA identifiers of U.S. airports. Most FAA identifiers agree with the corresponding IATA codes, but some do not, such as Saipan, whose FAA identifier is GSN and its IATA code is SPN, and some coincide with IATA codes of non-U.S. airports.

=== Naming conventions in general ===
Many airport codes consist of the first three letters of the city where the airport is located, for instance:

- AMS for Amsterdam
- DEL for Delhi
- SIN for Singapore

The code may also be another combination of the letters in the city's name, such as:

- GDL for Guadalajara
- HKG for Hong Kong
- WAW for Warsaw

Sometimes the airport code reflects pronunciation, rather than spelling, for example:

- NAN, which reflects the pronunciation of "Nadi" as [ˈnandi] in Fijian, where "d" is realized as the prenasalized stop [ⁿd]

For many reasons, some airport codes do not fit the normal scheme described above. Some airports, for example, cross several municipalities or regions, and therefore use codes derived from a combination of their letters, resulting in:

- DFW for Dallas/Fort Worth
- DTW for Detroit–Wayne County
- LBA for Leeds Bradford Airport
- MSP for Minneapolis–Saint Paul
- RDU for Raleigh–Durham

Other airports—particularly those serving cities with multiple airports—have codes derived from the name of the airport itself, for instance:

- JFK for New York's John F. Kennedy
- LHR for London's Heathrow Airport
- CDG for Paris's Charles de Gaulle (see below)

This is also true with some cities with a single airport (even if there is more than one airport in the metropolitan area of said city), such as BDL for Hartford, Connecticut's Bradley International Airport or Baltimore's BWI, for Baltimore/Washington International Airport; however, the latter also serves Washington, D.C., alongside Dulles International Airport (IAD, for International Airport Dulles) and Ronald Reagan Washington National Airport (DCA, for District of Columbia Airport).

The code also sometimes comes from the airport's former name, such as Orlando International Airport's MCO (for McCoy Air Force Base), or Chicago's O'Hare International Airport, which is coded ORD for its original name: Orchard Field. New Century AirCenter, serving the Kansas City metropolitan area, uses JCI, from its former name of Johnson County Industrial Airport.

In rare cases, the code comes from the airport's unofficial name, such as Kahului Airport's OGG (for local aviation pioneer Jimmy Hogg).

==== Cities with multiple commercial airports ====
In large metropolitan areas, airport codes are often named after the airport itself instead of the city it serves, while another code is reserved which refers to the city itself which can be used to search for flights to any of its airports. For instance:

- Beijing (BJS) – Capital (PEK) and Daxing (PKX)
- Belo Horizonte (BHZ) – Confins (CNF) and Pampulha (PLU, formerly BHZ)
- Bucharest (BUH) – Otopeni (OTP) is named after the town of Otopeni where the airport is located, while the city also has a business airport inside the city limits named Băneasa (BBU).
- Buenos Aires (BUE) – Ezeiza (EZE) is named after the suburb in Ezeiza Partido where the airport is located, while Aeroparque Jorge Newbery (AEP) is in the city proper.
- Chicago (CHI) – O'Hare (ORD), named after Orchard Field, the airport's former name, Midway (MDW), and Rockford (RFD).
- Jakarta (JKT) – Soekarno–Hatta (CGK) is named after Cengkareng, the district in which the airport is located, while the city also has another airport, Halim Perdanakusuma (HLP). JKT used to refer to the city's former airport, Kemayoran Airport, which closed down in the mid-1980s.
- London (LON) – Heathrow (LHR), Gatwick (LGW), City (LCY), Stansted (STN), Luton (LTN), and Southend (SEN)
- Milan (MIL) – Malpensa (MXP), Linate (LIN), and Orio al Serio (BGY)
- Montreal (YMQ) – Trudeau (YUL), Mirabel (YMX), and Metropolitan (YHU)
- Moscow (MOW) – Sheremetyevo (SVO), Domodedovo (DME), Vnukovo (VKO), Zhukovsky (ZIA), business airport Ostafyevo (OSF), and military air base Chkalovsky (CKL)
- New York City (NYC) – John F. Kennedy (JFK) → formerly Idlewild Airport (IDL), LaGuardia (LGA), and Newark (EWR)
- Osaka (OSA) – Itami (ITM, formerly OSA), Kansai (KIX), and Kobe (UKB)
- Paris (PAR) – Orly (ORY), Charles de Gaulle (CDG), Le Bourget (LBG), and Beauvais (BVA)
- Rio de Janeiro (RIO) – Galeão (GIG) and Santos Dumont (SDU)
- Rome (ROM) – Fiumicino (FCO) and Ciampino (CIA, formerly ROM)
- São Paulo (SAO) – Congonhas (CGH, formerly SAO), Guarulhos (GRU), and Campinas (VCP)
- Sapporo (SPK) – Chitose (CTS) and Okadama (OKD)
- Seoul (SEL) – Incheon (ICN) and Gimpo (GMP, formerly SEL)
- Stockholm (STO) – Arlanda (ARN), Bromma (BMA), Nyköping–Skavsta (NYO), and Västerås (VST)
- Tenerife (TCI) – Tenerife North (TFN) and Tenerife South (TFS)
- Tokyo (TYO) – Haneda (HND, formerly TYO), Narita (NRT), and military air base Yokota (OKO)
- Toronto (YTO) – Pearson (YYZ), Billy Bishop (YTZ), Hamilton (YHM), and Waterloo (YKF)
- Washington, D.C. (WAS) – Dulles (IAD), Reagan (DCA), and Baltimore–Washington (BWI)

Or using a code for the city in one of the major airports and then assigning another code to another airport:

- Almaty (ALA, formerly Alma-Ata) – Self-named (ALA) and Boraldai (BXJ)
- Bangkok (BKK) – Suvarnabhumi (BKK) and Don Mueang (DMK, formerly BKK)
- Belfast (BFS) – International (BFS) and Belfast City (BHD)
- Berlin (BER) – Self-named (BER). The city also previously had three airports, Tempelhof (THF), Schönefeld (SXF) and Tegel (TXL), with THF and TXL both now closed. The former Berlin Schönefeld Airport was absorbed into Berlin Brandenburg Airport, with the old Schönefeld terminal becoming Terminal 5.
- Chengdu (CTU, formerly Chengtu) – Shuangliu (CTU), Tianfu (TFU), and Huaizhou (HZU; zh)
- Colombo (CMB) – Bandaranaike (CMB) and Ratmalana (RML)
- Dakar (DKR) – Senghor (DKR) and Diass (DSS)
- Dallas–Fort Worth (DFW) – Self-named (DFW), Love Field (DAL), Meacham (FTW), Alliance (AFW), and Addison (ADS)
- Dubai (DXB) – Self-named (DXB) and Al Maktoum (DWC)
- Goa (GOI) – Dabolim (GOI) and Manohar (GOX)
- Glasgow (GLA) – International (GLA) and Prestwick (PIK)
- Houston (HOU) – Hobby (HOU), George Bush Intercontinental (IAH), and Ellington (EFD)
- Hyderabad (HYD) – Self-named (HYD) and Begumpet Airport (BPM)
- Istanbul (IST) – Self-named (IST), Sabiha Gökçen (SAW), and Atatürk (ISL, formerly IST)
- Johannesburg (JNB) – O. R. Tambo (formerly Jan Smuts) (JNB) and Lanseria (HLA)
- Kuala Lumpur (KUL) – Sepang (KUL) and Subang (SZB, formerly KUL)
- Kyiv (IEV) – Zhuliany (IEV) and Boryspil (KBP)
- Los Angeles (LAX) – Self-named (LAX), San Bernardino (SBD), Ontario (ONT), Orange County (SNA), Van Nuys (VNY), Palmdale (PMD), Long Beach (LGB), and Burbank (BUR)
- Ludhiana (LUH) – Self-named (LUH) and Ludhiana Halwara International Airport (HWR)
- Medan (MES) – Soewondo (formerly Polonia) (MES) and Kualanamu (KNO)
- Medellín (MDE) – José María Córdova (MDE) and Olaya Herrera (EOH)
- Mexico City (MEX) – Benito Juárez (MEX) and Felipe Ángeles (NLU)
- Melbourne (MEL) – Tullamarine (MEL), Essendon (MEB), and Avalon (AVV)
- Miami (MIA) – Self-named (MIA), Fort Lauderdale (FLL), and West Palm Beach (DJT, formerly PBI)
- Mumbai (BOM, formerly Bombay) – Shivaji (BOM), Navi Mumbai (NMI), and Juhu Aerodrome
- Nagoya (NGO) – Centrair (NGO) and Komaki (NKM, formerly NGO)
- Rajkot (RAJ) – Self-named (RAJ) and Rajkot International Airport (HSR)
- San Diego – Self-named (SAN) and Tijuana (TIJ). TIJ is physically located in Tijuana, Mexico, but offers access directly to and from the US via the Cross Border Xpress.
- San Francisco (SFO) – Self-named (SFO), Oakland (OAK), San Jose–Mineta (SJC), and Sonoma–Schulz (STS)
- Seattle (SEA) – Tacoma (Sea–Tac) (SEA), Boeing Field (BFI), and Paine Field (PAE)
- Shanghai (SHA) – Pudong (PVG) and Hongqiao (SHA)
- Sydney (SYD) – Kingsford Smith (SYD), Bankstown (BWU), and Western Sydney (WSI)
- Taipei (TPE) – Taoyuan (formerly Chiang Kai-shek) (TPE) and Songshan (TSA, formerly TPE)
- Tehran (THR) – Imam Khomeini (IKA) and Mehrabad (THR)
- Tel Aviv (TLV) – Ben Gurion (TLV) and (formerly) Sde Dov (SDV)
- Yogyakarta (JOG, formerly Jogjakarta) — Adisutjipto (JOG) and International (YIA)

When different cities with the same name each have an airport, they need to be assigned different codes. Examples include:

- Juan Santamaría International Airport (SJO) is in Alajuela, serving the capital San José de Costa Rica. While Norman Y. Mineta San Jose International Airport (SJC) is in San Jose, California, the United States, and Los Cabos International Airport (SJD) is in San José del Cabo, Mexico.
- Birmingham–Shuttlesworth International Airport (BHM) is in Birmingham, Alabama, the United States and Birmingham Airport (BHX) is in Birmingham, England, United Kingdom.
- Rajiv Gandhi International Airport (HYD) is in Hyderabad, Telangana, India, while Hyderabad Airport (Sindh) (HDD) is in Hyderabad, Sindh, Pakistan.
- Portland International Jetport (PWM) is in Portland, Maine, while Portland International Airport (PDX) is in Portland, Oregon.
- Manchester Airport (MAN) is in Manchester, England, United Kingdom, while Manchester-Boston Regional Airport (MHT) is in Manchester, New Hampshire, United States.
- Arturo Merino Benítez International Airport (SCL) is in Santiago, Chile; while Antonio Maceo Airport (SCU) is in Santiago, Cuba; Santiago–Rosalía de Castro Airport (SCQ) is in Santiago de Compostela, Spain; and Cibao International Airport (STI) serves Santiago de los Caballeros, Dominican Republic.
- Ingeniero Ambrosio L.V. Taravella International Airport (COR) is in Córdoba, Argentina; while Córdoba Airport (ODB) is in Córdoba, Spain.
- Tocumen International Airport (PTY) is in Panama City, Panama, while Northwest Florida Beaches International Airport (ECP) is in Panama City, Florida.

Sometimes, a new airport is built, replacing the old one, leaving the city's new "major" airport (or the only remaining airport) code to no longer correspond with the city's name. The original airport in Nashville, Tennessee, was built in 1936 as part of the Works Progress Administration and called Berry Field with the designation, BNA. A new facility known as Nashville International Airport was built in 1987 but still uses BNA. This is in conjunction to rules aimed to avoid confusion that seem to apply in the United States, which state that "the first and second letters or second and third letters of an identifier may not be duplicated with less than 200 nautical miles separation." Thus, Washington, D.C. area's three airports all have radically different codes: IAD for Washington–Dulles, DCA for Washington–Reagan (District of Columbia Airport), and BWI for Baltimore (Baltimore–Washington International, formerly BAL). Since HOU is used for William P. Hobby Airport, the new Houston–Intercontinental became IAH. The code BKK was originally assigned to Bangkok–Don Mueang and was later transferred to Suvarnabhumi Airport, while the former adopted DMK. Meanwhile, Tan Son Nhat Airport keeps its Saigon-inspired SGN code even though the city has long been renamed to Ho Chi Minh City immediately after the Vietnamese unification, and the city's new primary airport Long Thanh International adopts a brand new code LTH after its own name rather than any derivatives from the name of the city that it serves or the legacy SGN designation. The code ISK was originally assigned to Gandhinagar Airport (Nashik's old airport) and later on transferred to Ozar Airport (Nashik's current airport). Shanghai–Hongqiao retained the code SHA, while the newer Shanghai–Pudong adopted PVG. The opposite was true for Berlin: the airport Berlin–Tegel used the code TXL, while its smaller counterpart Berlin–Schönefeld used SXF; the Berlin Brandenburg Airport, which reuses much of Schönefeld's infrastructure, has the airport code BER, which is also part of its branding. The airports of Hamburg (HAM) and Hannover (HAJ) are less than 100 nautical miles (190 km) apart and therefore share the same first and middle letters, indicating that this rule might be followed only in Germany.

==== Cities or airports changing names ====
Many cities retain historical names in their airport codes, even after having undergone an official name/spelling/transliteration change:

- In Angola: NDD for Sumbe (formerly Novo Redondo), NOV for Huambo (formerly Nova Lisboa), PGI for Chitato (formerly Portugália), VHC for Saurimo (formerly Henrique de Carvalho), SDD for Lubango (formerly Sá da Bandeira), SPP for Menongue (formerly Serpa Pinto), SSY for M'banza-Kongo (formerly São Salvador), and SVP for Cuíto (formerly Silva Porto)
- In Armenia: LWN for Gyumri (formerly Leninakan), NAJ for Nakhchivan (formerly Nakhijevan)
- In Azerbaijan: KVD for Ganja (formerly Kirovabad)
- In Bangladesh: DAC for Dhaka (formerly Dacca)
- In Belarus: MVQ for Mahilyow (formerly Mogilev)
- In Cambodia: KOS for Sihanoukville (formerly Kampong Som)
- In Canada: YFB for Iqaluit (formerly Frobisher Bay), YHU for MET – Montreal Metropolitan Airport (formerly Montréal/Saint-Hubert Airport)
- In China: PEK for Beijing (formerly Peking), TSN for Tianjin (formerly Tientsin), CKG for Chongqing (formerly Chungking), NKG for Nanjing (formerly Nanking), TNA for Jinan (formerly Tsinan), TAO for Qingdao (formerly Tsingtao), CTU for Chengdu (formerly Chengtu), KWE for Guiyang (formerly Kweiyang), KWL for Guilin (formerly Kweilin), and CAN for Guangzhou (formerly Canton). Xi'an's older Xiguan Airport used the code SIA (for Sian), but it has been replaced by the Xi'an Xianyang International Airport whose code is XIY. The older IATA codes follow Chinese postal romanization, introduced in 1906, officially abolished in 1964 and in use well into the 1980s, while gradually superseded by Pinyin.
  - DYG for Zhangjiajie (formerly Dayong; a genuine change in city name, rather than just a change of romanization)
- In Czechia: GTW for Holešov Airport serving Zlín (formerly Gottwaldov)
- In the Democratic Republic of Congo: PFR for Ilebo (formerly Port-Francqui)
- In Croatia: PUY for Pula, Croatia. The Y in PUY stands for Yugoslavia, the former country that Croatia was part of until 1991.
- In Equatorial Guinea: SSG for Malabo (formerly Santa Isabel, Spanish Guinea)
- In Fiji: PTF for Malolo Lailai (formerly Plantation Island, Fiji)
- In the Federated States of Micronesia: TKK for Chuuk (formerly Truk)
- In Greenland: most airports, including SFJ for Kangerlussuaq (formerly Søndre Strømfjord), GOH for Nuuk (formerly Godthåb), JAV for Ilulissat (Jacobshavn), JEG for Aasiaat (Egedesminde), JSU for Maniitsoq (Sukkertoppen), JFR for Paamiut (Frederikshåb)
- In India: BOM for Mumbai (formerly Bombay), CCU for Kolkata (formerly Calcutta), MAA for Chennai (formerly Madras), and CNN for Kannur (formerly Cannanore)
- In Indonesia: TKG for Bandar Lampung (formerly Tanjung Karang), UPG for Makassar (formerly Ujung Pandang). In addition, when the Enhanced Indonesian Spelling System was introduced in 1972, a few older IATA codes retained the previous spelling: BTJ for Banda Aceh (formerly Banda Atjeh), DJJ for Jayapura (formerly Djajapura), and JOG for Yogyakarta (formerly Jogjakarta).
- In Kazakhstan: ALA for Almaty (formerly Alma-Ata), NQZ for Astana (formerly Nur-Sultan and Tselinograd (TSE)), SCO for Aktau (formerly Shevchenko), GUW for Atyrau (formerly Guryev), KOV for Kokshetau (formerly Kokchetav), DMB for Taraz (formerly Dzhambyl), PLX for Semey (formerly Semipalatinsk), CIT for Şymkent (formerly Chimkent), and DZN for Jezkazgan (formerly Dzhezkazgan)
- In Kyrgyzstan: FRU for Bishkek (formerly Frunze)
- In Lebanon: BEY for Beirut (formerly known by the French name Beyrouth)
- In Lithuania: VNO for Vilnius (formerly known by the Polish name Wilno and Russian Вильно, Vilno)
- In Madagascar: DIE for Antsiranana (formerly Diego-Suarez), WPB for Boriziny (formerly Port Bergé)
- In Moldova: KIV for Chișinău (formerly Kishinev); in 2024 renamed Chișinău Eugen Doga International Airport and given the new code RMO
- In Montenegro: IVG for Berane (formerly Ivangrad), TGD for Podgorica (formerly Titograd)
- In Mozambique: VJB for Xai-Xai (formerly João Belo), VPY for Chimoio (formerly Vila Pery), FXO for Cuamba (formerly Nova Freixo), TGS for Chokwe (formerly Vila Trigo de Morais), VXC for Lichinga (formerly Vila Cabral)
- In Myanmar: RGN for Yangon (formerly Rangoon), SNW for Thandwe (formerly Sandoway), and TVY for Dawei (formerly Tavoy)
- In Nepal: BWA for Siddharthanagar (formerly Bhairahawa)
- In Pakistan: LYP for Faisalabad (formerly Lyallpur)
- In Russia: LED for St. Petersburg (formerly Leningrad), GOJ for Nizhny Novgorod (formerly Gorky, from German romanization Gorkij), SVX for Yekaterinburg (formerly Sverdlovsk), KUF for Samara (formerly Kuybyshev), OGZ for Vladikavkaz (formerly Ordzhonikidze), and KLD for Tver (formerly Kalinin), KAJ for Krasnoyarsk (from German Romanization Krasnojarsk)
- In South Africa: NLP for Mbombela (formerly Nelspruit), PLZ for Gqeberha (formerly Port Elizabeth), and PTG for Polokwane (formerly Pietersburg)
- In South Korea: CJU for Jeju (formerly Cheju), KAG for Gangneung (formerly Kangnung), PUS for Busan (formerly Pusan), and TAE for Daegu (formerly Taegu)
- In Tajikistan: LBD for Khujand (formerly Leninabad), DYU for Dushanbe (formerly Dyushanbe)
- In Turkmenistan: KRW for Türkmenbaşy (formerly Krasnovodsk), CRZ for Türkmenabat (formerly Chardzhev), and TAZ for Daşoguz (formerly Tashauz)
- In Ukraine: IEV for Kyiv (formerly Kiev), VSG for Luhansk (formerly Voroshilovgrad), KGO for Kropyvnytskyi (formerly Kirovograd), LWO for Lviv (formerly Lwów while part of Poland until 1939, and still called Lvov in Russian), and IFO for Ivano-Frankivsk (in Soviet times spelt in Russian as Ivano-Frankovsk);
- In Vietnam: SGN for Ho Chi Minh City (formerly Saigon)
- In Western Sahara: VIL for Dakhla (formerly Villa Cisneros)

Some airport codes are based on previous names associated with a present airport, often with a military heritage. These include:

- Chicago's O'Hare, which is assigned ORD based on its old name of Orchard Field. It was renamed O'Hare in 1949 and expanded throughout the 1950s.
- Both airports serving Columbus, Ohio retain codes based on former names: Rickenbacker International Airport uses LCK, for its former name of Lockbourne Air Force Base, while John Glenn Columbus International Airport uses CMH after its old name of Columbus Municipal Hangar.
- Travis Air Force Base uses SUU, for its former name of Fairfield-Suisun Army Air Base.
- North Texas Regional Airport uses PNX, for its former name of Perrin Air Force Station.
- Fresno Yosemite International Airport uses the code FAT, derived from a previous name of the airport, Fresno Air Terminal.
- Orlando International Airport was founded as Orlando Army Air Field #2 but uses MCO for having been renamed McCoy Air Force Base in 1959 in honor of a wing commander who crashed at the field in 1958. It was converted in the early 1960s to joint civilian/military use and renamed Orlando Jetport at McCoy, then renamed Orlando International Airport in the early 1980s.
- Kansas City International Airport uses MCI, for its original name of Mid-Continent International Airport. The airport is referred to locally as "KCI", and attempts have been made to change its IATA code to match; however, "KCI" is already used for an airport in Timor-Leste.
- Spokane International Airport was so named in 1960 but goes by GEG because it was built on the former Geiger Field, renamed in 1941 for Major Harold Geiger when the US Army acquired it.
- Louis Armstrong New Orleans International Airport was originally named Moisant Field after daredevil aviator John Moisant, who died in 1910 in an airplane crash on agricultural land where the airport is now located. Its IATA code MSY was derived from Moisant Stock Yards, as Lakefront Airport retained the code NEW.
- Lehigh Valley International Airport uses ABE, for its former name of Allentown–Bethlehem–Easton International Airport.
- William R. Fairchild International Airport uses CLM, for its former name of Clallam County Municipal Landing Field.
- Chicago Executive Airport uses PWK, for its former name, Palwaukee Municipal Airport (which was derived from its location on Palatine Road and Milwaukee Avenue).
- Dallas Executive Airport used RBD, for its former name, Redbird Airport.
- TSTC Waco Airport uses CNW, as it was formerly Connally Air Force Base.
- Glacier Park International Airport uses FCA, for its former name Flathead County Airport.
- Clark International Airport uses CRK, for the site of the former Clark Air Base, an American military air base located in the province of Pampanga in the Philippines.
- Sohag International Airport uses HMB as it was named after President Hosni Mubarak from its opening in 2010 until his ousting in early 2011. His name was removed from the airport but the IATA code has not been changed.

Some airports are named for an administrative division or nearby city, rather than the one they are located in:

- Juan Santamaría International Airport is located in Alajuela province, but since it is so close to the capital city of San José, Costa Rica, the airport serves the whole Central Valley using SJO.
- Grand Strand Airport uses CRE for the former municipality of Crescent Beach, South Carolina.
- Cincinnati/Northern Kentucky International Airport is located in an unincorporated area of Boone County, Kentucky and uses CVG after the nearby city of Covington (located in neighbouring Kenton County).
- San Ignacio Town Airstrip, located in San Ignacio, Belize, uses CYD because it is located in the Cayo District.
- Ronald Reagan Washington National Airport in Crystal City, Virginia uses DCA for the District of Columbia (DC) and Arlington.
- Prince Naif bin Abdulaziz International Airport in Buraidah, Saudi Arabia uses ELQ for the Al-Qassim Province (El Qassim)
- Damazin Airport in Sudan uses RSS, for the nearby Roseires Dam.

Other airport codes are of obscure origin, and each has its own peculiarities:

- Nashville uses BNA for its former name as Berry Field, henceforth Berry Nashville Airport.
- Louisville Muhammad Ali International Airport is SDF for Standiford Field, its original name (Elisha David Standiford who, as a businessman and legislator, played an important role in Louisville transportation history and owned part of the land on which the airport was built.)
- Knoxville uses TYS for Charles McGhee Tyson, whose family donated the land for the first airport in Knoxville
- Kahului, the main gateway into Maui, uses OGG in homage to Hawaiian aviation pioneer Bertram J. Hogg
- Gold Coast, Australia, uses OOL due to its former name as Coolangatta Airport, named after the suburb in which it is located
- Sunshine Coast, Australia, uses MCY due to its former names Maroochydore Airport and Maroochydore-Sunshine Coast Airport. It is actually located in Marcoola rather than Maroochydore.
- Buli Airport uses PGQ, for its location in the Pekaulang administrative division.
- New River Valley Airport uses PSK for its location in Pulaski County, Virginia.
- Río Amazonas Airport uses PTZ for its location in Pastaza Province.
- Brackett Field uses POC, as it was named after a flying enthusiast and faculty member of nearby Pomona College.
- Yan'an Nanniwan Airport inherited the ENY code from the city of Yan'an's old airport, Yan'an Ershilipu Airport.
- Northwest Florida Beaches International Airport uses the code ECP, which when proposed was thought it could stand for "Everyone Can Party"
- Similarly, Laughlin/Bullhead International Airport uses IFP, for "International Fun Place."
- Franklin County Airport (Tennessee) uses UOS due to its proximity to the University of the South.

In Asia, codes that do not correspond with their city's names include Niigata's KIJ, Nanchang's KHN and Pyongyang's FNJ.

A rare exception to airport codes staying constant even after name changes is the primary international airport in New York City. Initially known as Idlewild Airport and given the code IDL, it was changed to John F. Kennedy International Airport in 1963 following the assassination of the president. The name change came with a new code, KIA for "Kennedy International Airport". However, this code would gain a negative association with the onset of the Vietnam War as the term "killed in action" was commonly abbreviated KIA. Airport authorities applied to the IATA to change the code in 1968, giving the airport its well-known code of JFK.

Another exception occurred when Palm Beach International Airport was renamed in July 2026 to President Donald J. Trump International Airport; the IATA code was changed from PBI to DJT just over a month later.

==== Multiple codes for a single airport ====
EuroAirport Basel Mulhouse Freiburg, which serves three countries, has three airport codes: BSL, MLH, EAP.

- The French part of the airport is assigned MLH, for Mulhouse, France
- The Swiss part of the airport is assigned BSL, for Basel, Switzerland
- The airport also has a Metropolitan Area Code, EAP, for EuroAirport.

==== Airport codes using the English name of the city ====
Some cities have a local name in their respective language which is different from the name in English, yet the airport code represents only the English name. Examples include:

- BKK – Bangkok, Thailand (Thai: กรุงเทพ, romanized: Krung Thep)
- CAI – Cairo, Egypt (Arabic: القاهرة, romanized: al-Qāhirah)
- CGN – Cologne, Germany (German: Köln)
- CPH – Copenhagen, Denmark (Danish: København)
- DEL – Delhi, India (Hindi: दिल्ली, romanized: Dilli)
- DUB – Dublin, Ireland (Irish: Baile Átha Cliath)
- FLR – Florence, Italy (Italian: Firenze)
- GVA – Geneva, Switzerland (French: Genève)
- HAV – Havana, Cuba (Spanish: La Habana)
- HKG – Hong Kong (Chinese: 香港, romanized: Hoeng1 gong2; Hēunggóng)
- LKO – Lucknow, India (Hindi: लखनऊ, romanized: Lakhnau)
- MCT – Muscat, Oman (Arabic: مَسْقَط, romanized: Masqaṭ)
- PRG – Prague, Czechia (Czech: Praha)
- VCE – Venice, Italy (Italian: Venezia)
- VIE – Vienna, Austria (German: Wien)

==== Scarcity of codes ====
Due to scarcity of codes (the three-character code is used by a maximum of 17,576 airports worldwide only), some airports are given codes with letters not found in their names:

- ACI ("Alderney, Channel Islands") for Alderney, Guernsey
- BGO for Bergen, Norway
- CWB for Curitiba, Brazil
- DAD for Da Nang, Vietnam
- FNJ for Pyongyang, North Korea

Use of 'X' as a filler

The use of 'X' as a filler letter is a practice to create three-letter identifiers when more straightforward options were unavailable:

- MMX for Malmö, Sweden
- CNX for Chiang Mai, Thailand (e.g. CMX was already allocated to Houghton County Memorial Airport in the United States)
- MXX for Mora–Siljan Airport, Sweden
- DXB for Dubai, United Arab Emirates (DUB was already allocated to Dublin Airport, Ireland)
- MXP for Milan, Italy (located outside of the city)
- GRX for Granada, Spain (e.g. GRA was already allocated to Gamarra Airport in Colombia)
- XGG for Gorom Gorom, Burkina Faso
- BHX for Birmingham, United Kingdom (e.g. BHM was already allocated to Birmingham–Shuttlesworth Airport in the United States)
- TXL for Berlin, Germany. Which was closed in 2020
- PKX for Beijing Daxing International Airport, China. The letters PK stand for the old Romanization of the city name as "Peking," which survives in the code for the main city airport Beijing Capital International Airport (PEK).
- CIX for Chiclayo, Peru
- SXB for Strasbourg, France
- SZX for Shenzhen, China

For airports without convenient codes, many airports in India use "IX" followed by the first letter of the cities they lie in:

- IXA for Agartala Airport (Singerbhil Airport)
- IXB for Bagdogra Airport (Siliguri, West Bengal)
- IXC for Chandigarh Airport
- IXJ for Jammu Airport
- IXL for Leh Kushok Bakula Rimpochee Airport
- IXM for Madurai Airport
- IXP for Pathankot Airport
- IXR for Ranchi Airport (Birsa Munda Airport)
- IXS for Silchar Airport (Kumbhirgram Airport)

Other "IX" series codes are also allocated without any correspondence to the name of the airport or the city they lie in:

- IXD for Prayagraj Airport / Bamrauli Air Force Base
- IXE for Mangalore International Airport
- IXG for Belgaum Airport
- IXH for Kailashahar Airport
- IXI for Lilabari Airport
- IXK for Junagadh Airport (Keshod Airport)
- IXN for Khowai Airport
- IXQ for Kamalpur Airport
- IXT for Pasighat Airport
- IXU for Chikkalthana Airport (Chhatrapati Sambhajinagar, Maharashtra)
- IXV for Along Airport
- IXW for Jamshedpur Airport
- IXY for Kandla Airport
- IXZ for Vir Savarkar Airport (Sri Vijaya Puram, Andaman and Nicobar)

Some airports in the United States retained their NWS (National Weather Service) codes and simply appended an X at the end. Examples include:

- LAX for Los Angeles
- PDX for Portland, Oregon
- PHX for Phoenix (Note: the X does not originate from the x at the end of Phoenix but is the result of appending an X at the end of the NWS code.)
- XWA for Williston, North Dakota

Use of 'Q' as a filler

The use of 'Q' as a filler letter is also a practice to create three-letter identifiers when more straightforward options were unavailable:

- SVQ for Seville Airport, Andalusia, Spain
- PNQ for Lohegaon Airport, Pune, Maharashtra
- SRQ for Sarasota Airport, Sarasota, Florida
- YQM for Greater Moncton Roméo LeBlanc International Airport, Moncton, New Brunswick

==== Airports without codes ====
A lot of minor airfields without scheduled passenger traffic have ICAO codes but not IATA codes, since the four letter codes allow a larger number of codes. IATA codes are mainly used for passenger services such as tickets and checked luggage, while ICAO codes are used by pilots. In the US, such airfields use FAA codes instead of ICAO.

There are airports with scheduled service for which there are ICAO codes but not IATA codes, such as Nkhotakota Airport/Tangole Airport in Malawi or Chōfu Airport in Tokyo, Japan. There are also several minor airports in Russia (e.g., Omsukchan Airport) which lack IATA codes and instead use internal Russian codes for booking. Flights to these airports cannot be booked through the international air booking systems or have international luggage transferred there, and thus, they are booked instead through the airline or a domestic booking system. Several heliports in Greenland have three-letter codes used internally which might be IATA codes for airports in distant countries.

There are several airports with scheduled service that have not been assigned ICAO codes that do have IATA codes, especially in the U.S. For example, several airports in Alaska have scheduled commercial service, such as Stebbins and Nanwalek, which use FAA codes instead of ICAO codes.

Thus, neither system completely includes all airports with scheduled service.

==== Use in colloquial speech ====
Some airports are identified in colloquial speech by their IATA code. Examples include JFK for New York-Kennedy airport, LAX, PDX and CCU.

== See also ==
- Lists of airports by IATA and ICAO code
- Airline codes
- Airspace class
- Geocoding
- ICAO airport code
- International Air Transport Association code
- List of IATA-indexed railway stations
- UN/LOCODE
