= List of TAAG Angola Airlines destinations =

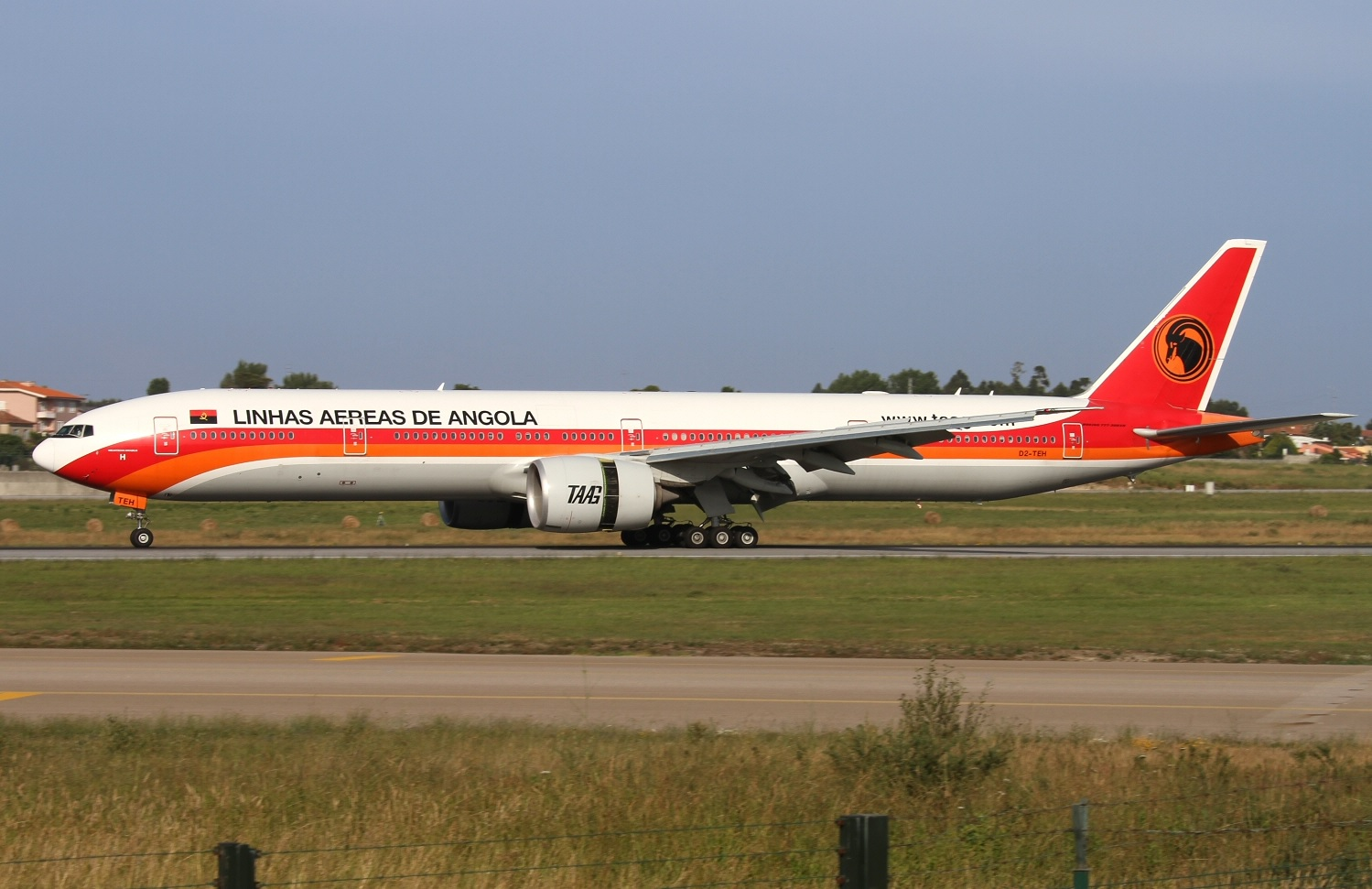
A TAAG Angola Airlines Boeing 777-300ER arrives at Porto Airport.

Following is a list of destinations TAAG Angola Airlines flies to as part of its scheduled services, as of May 2023. Terminated destinations are also shown.

TAAG services to Beijing were launched in 2008. At February 2018 TAAG Angola Airlines' network included 28 non-stop destinations, 13 of them domestic ones. The five top domestic routes at this time were Luanda–Cabinda, Luanda–Lubango, Luanda–Ondjiva, Luanda–Huambo and Luanda–Luena. At October 2014, TAAG Angola Airlines served 31 non-stop destinations. At this time, the carrier's three largest markets by seat capacity were Western Europe, Southern Africa and Upper South America. Around one-third of the airline's international capacity was in Africa, but only two of TAAG's five international markets were within this continent (Namibia and South Africa). Portugal and Brazil were the company's top markets based on available seats, followed by the Republic of South Africa, Namibia and the United Arab Emirates (UAE). Services to the UAE ceased in 2015 when flights to Dubai were terminated. In July 2016, the number of non-stop destinations reduced to 28, including 12 domestic, 11 in Africa, two in Brazil and Portugal, and one in China. By this time, TAAG's two main long-haul markets were Portugal and Brazil, representing approximately 36% and 19%, respectively, of the airline's operations.

== List ==
Country	City	Airport	Notes	Refs
Angola	Benguela	Benguela Airport	Terminated	
Angola	Cabinda	Cabinda Airport		
Angola	Catumbela	Catumbela Airport		
Angola	Cuito	Joaquim Kapango Airport		
Angola	Dundo	Dundo Airport		
Angola	Huambo	Albano Machado Airport		
Angola	Luanda	Dr. Antonio Agostinho Neto International Airport	Hub	
Angola	Luanda	Quatro de Fevereiro Airport	Airport closed	
Angola	Lubango	Lubango Airport		
Angola	Luena	Luena Airport		
Angola	Malanje	Malanje Airport	Terminated	
Angola	Menongue	Menongue Airport		
Angola	Namibe	Namibe Airport		
Angola	Ondjiva	Ondjiva Pereira Airport		
Angola	Saurimo	Saurimo Airport		
Angola	Soyo	Soyo Airport		
Brazil	Rio de Janeiro	Rio de Janeiro/Galeão International Airport	Terminated	
Brazil	São Paulo	São Paulo/Guarulhos International Airport		
Cameroon	Douala	Douala International Airport	Terminated	
Cape Verde	Sal	Amílcar Cabral International Airport	Terminated	
Cape Verde	Praia	Praia International Airport	Resumes 31 October 2026	
Central African Republic	Bangui	Bangui M'Poko International Airport	Terminated	
China	Beijing	Beijing Capital International Airport	Terminated	
China	Guangzhou	Guangzhou Baiyun International Airport		
Cuba	Havana	José Martí International Airport		
Democratic Republic of the Congo	Kinshasa	N'djili Airport		
France	Paris	Charles de Gaulle Airport	Terminated	
Germany	Berlin	Berlin Schönefeld Airport	Airport closed	
Guinea-Bissau	Bissau	Osvaldo Vieira International Airport	Terminated	
Italy	Rome	Leonardo da Vinci–Fiumicino Airport	Terminated	
Kenya	Nairobi	Jomo Kenyatta International Airport		
Mozambique	Maputo	Maputo International Airport		
Namibia	Windhoek	Hosea Kutako International Airport		
Nigeria	Lagos	Murtala Muhammed International Airport		
Portugal	Lisbon	Lisbon Airport		
Portugal	Porto	Porto Airport	Seasonal	
Republic of the Congo	Brazzaville	Maya-Maya Airport		
Republic of the Congo	Pointe-Noire	Agostinho-Neto International Airport		
Russia	Moscow	Sheremetyevo International Airport	Terminated	
Senegal	Dakar	Blaise Diagne International Airport	Begins 31 October 2026	
Spain	Madrid	Adolfo Suárez Madrid–Barajas Airport	Terminated	
South Africa	Cape Town	Cape Town International Airport		
South Africa	Johannesburg	O. R. Tambo International Airport		
São Tomé and Príncipe	São Tomé	São Tomé International Airport		
United Arab Emirates	Dubai	Dubai International Airport	Terminated	
Zambia	Lusaka	Kenneth Kaunda International Airport		
Zimbabwe	Harare	Robert Gabriel Mugabe International Airport		

== See also ==
- Transport in Angola
