= National Air Force of Angola =

Aerial warfare branch of Angola's armed forces

- Força Aérea Nacional de Angola
- Emblem
- Founded: 21 January 1976; 50 years ago
- Country: Angola
- Type: Air force
- Role: Aerial warfare
- Size: 6,000 personnel 286 aircraft
- Part of: Angolan Armed Forces
- Headquarters: Luanda
- Engagements: Angolan Civil War; South African Border War

Commanders
- Commander-in-Chief: President João Lourenço
- Air Force Chief of Staff: General Altino Dos Santos

Insignia
- Roundel

Aircraft flown
- Attack: Su-25, Su-22
- Fighter: Sukhoi Su-30, Su-27, MiG-23, MiG-21
- Helicopter: Mi-8
- Attack helicopter: Mi-24/35
- Patrol: EMB-110, C.212
- Trainer: Yak-11, PC-7, Embraer EMB 312 Tucano
- Transport: An-12, An-26, An-72

The National Air Force of Angola (FANA; Portuguese: Força Aérea Nacional de Angola) is the air force branch of the Angolan Armed Forces.

== History ==
Angola became independent from Portugal on 11 November 1975. However, the foundations for the establishment of the air force were laid before independence when members of the then Flying Club of Angola (Aeroclube de Angola) were assembled at Luanda in October 1975. These people and aircraft left behind by the Portuguese Air Force formed the basis for the air transport branch of the force.

The force was formally established on 21 January 1976 as the People's Air Force of Angola / Air and Antiaircraft Defense or FAPA/DAA (Força Aérea Popular de Angola / Defesa Aérea e Antiaérea). Its first batch of Soviet MiG fighter aircraft was delivered in mid-December 1975. The FAPA/DAA fought several battles with South African Air Force aircraft in November 1981, October 1982, and twice in September 1987.

Circa 1983–85, in order to enhance MPLA's combat capacity, Romania sent 150 flight instructors and other aviation personnel, who contributed to the establishment of an Angolan Military Aviation School.

The FANA has bases at Luanda, Catumbela, Belas, Luena, Kuito, Lubango and Moçâmedes. The World Factbook, produced by the CIA, reported that by 2007 the name of the force had changed to "National Air Force".

Most of the inventory is out of service, and refers to historical equipment delivered along the years. FAN has many bases – most of them, former Portuguese Air Force bases and others courtesy of the Cold War – but few airplanes that actually fly. The main body of the active air force is made of transport/cargo planes, used for moving supplies, equipment and personnel between parts of the country.

On 7 November 2025, an Airbus announcement for the delivery of 2 C-295 showed the new Roundel of the air force. Main difference is the removal of half-cogwheel, machete and the five-pointed star from the roundel, which is a part of its national flag.

== Structure ==
The National Air Force of Angola is headed by the Chief of Staff of the FANA (Chefe do Estado-Maior da FANA). The Chief of Staff of the FANA is a General directly subordinate to the Chief of the General Staff of the Armed Forces of Angola.

FANA follows a Russian/ex-Soviet organizational model, with its air units being aviation regiments (regimentos de aviação), each one including several squadrons (esquadrões). To each of the six aviation regiments corresponds an air base. Besides the aviation regiments, there is also a Pilot Training School.

Its order of battle is:

- 25th Fighter Aviation Regiment (Kuito Airport)
  - 13th Fighter Squadron (Su-27 and Su-27UB)
  - 12th Fighter Squadron (MiG-23ML and MiG-23UB)
  - 11th Fighter Squadron (MiG-21bis, MiG-21M, MiG- 21F-13 and MiG-21U)
- 26th Fighter Aviation Regiment (Moçâmedes Air Base)
  - 14th Fighter Squadron (Su-24MK)
  - 16th Fighter Squadron (Su-25K and Su-25UBK)
  - 15th Fighter Squadron (Su-22M-4K and Su-22UM-3K)
- 24th Training Regiment (Menongue Airport)
  - 8th Training Squadron (L-39ZA, EMB-312, PC-9 and PC-7)
  - 9th Training Squadron (L-29 Delfin, MiG-15UTI, Yak-11 and PC-6B)
  - 10th Training Squadron (Cessna 172 and Z-142C)
- 23rd Air Transportation Regiment (Luanda Air Base)
  - 5th Light Transportation Squadron (An-2, An-12, An-24, An-26, An-28, An-32, An-72, An-74, F-27, C-212-300, C-212-200, BN- 2A-21 Commander Turbo, Do-27, Do-28C and Do-228)
  - 6th Transportation Squadron (Il-76T, C-130K, Lockheed L-100-20 and Boeing 707)
  - 7th Transportation Squadron (Boeing 707 and EMB-120)

- Mil Mi-24s of Angola
- https://twitter.com/HammerOfWar5/status/1608164658170437632/photo/1

- 21st Transportation Helicopter Regiment (Luena Airport)
  - 1st Helicopter Squadron (SA-315, IAR-316, SA-342m, AB-212 and SA-365m)
  - 2nd Helicopter Squadron (Mi-8, Mi-17 and AS-532)
- 22nd Combat Helicopter Regiment (Huambo Air Base)
  - 3rd Helicopter Squadron (Mi-25, Mi-35, AS-565AA, AS-565UA and SA-342m)
  - 4th Helicopter Squadron (Mi-24, Mi-25 and Mi-35)
- Pilot Basic Training School (Lobito)

== Inventory ==
=== Aircraft ===
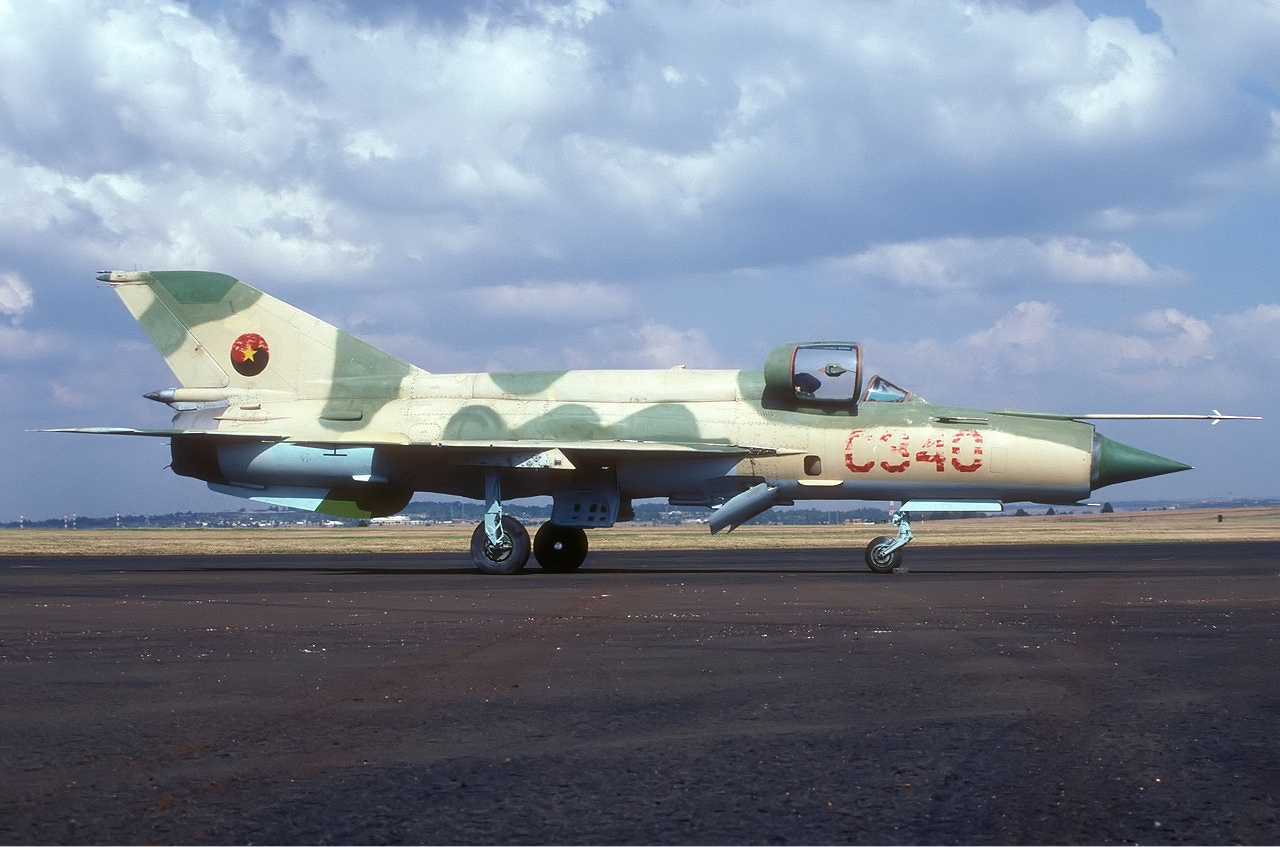
An Angolan Air Force MiG-21bis

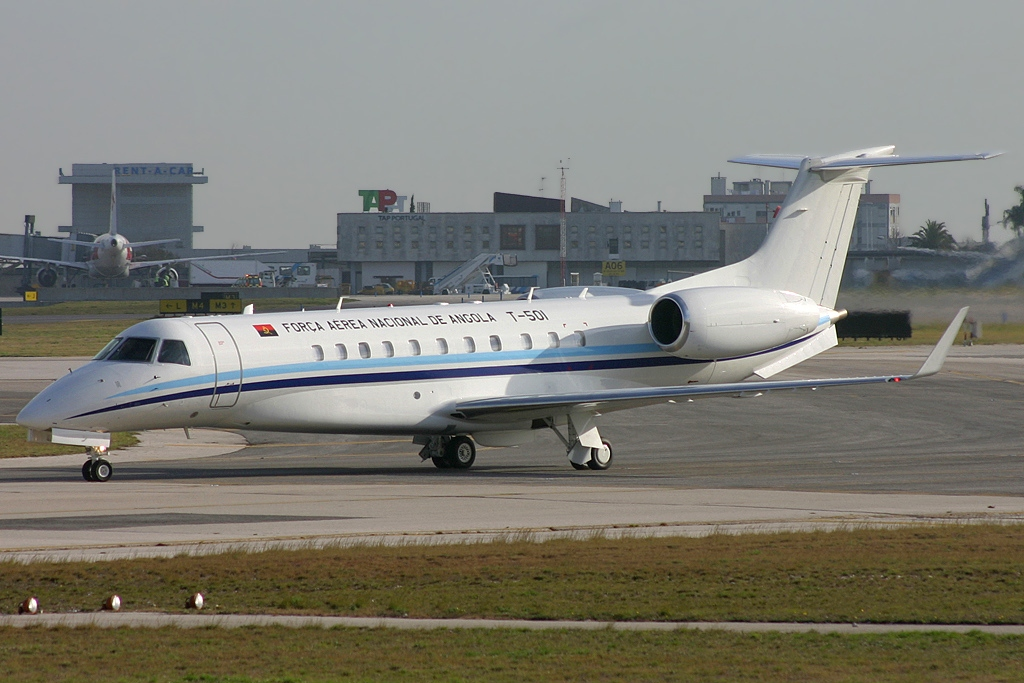
Angolan VIP Embraer ERJ-135BJ Legacy

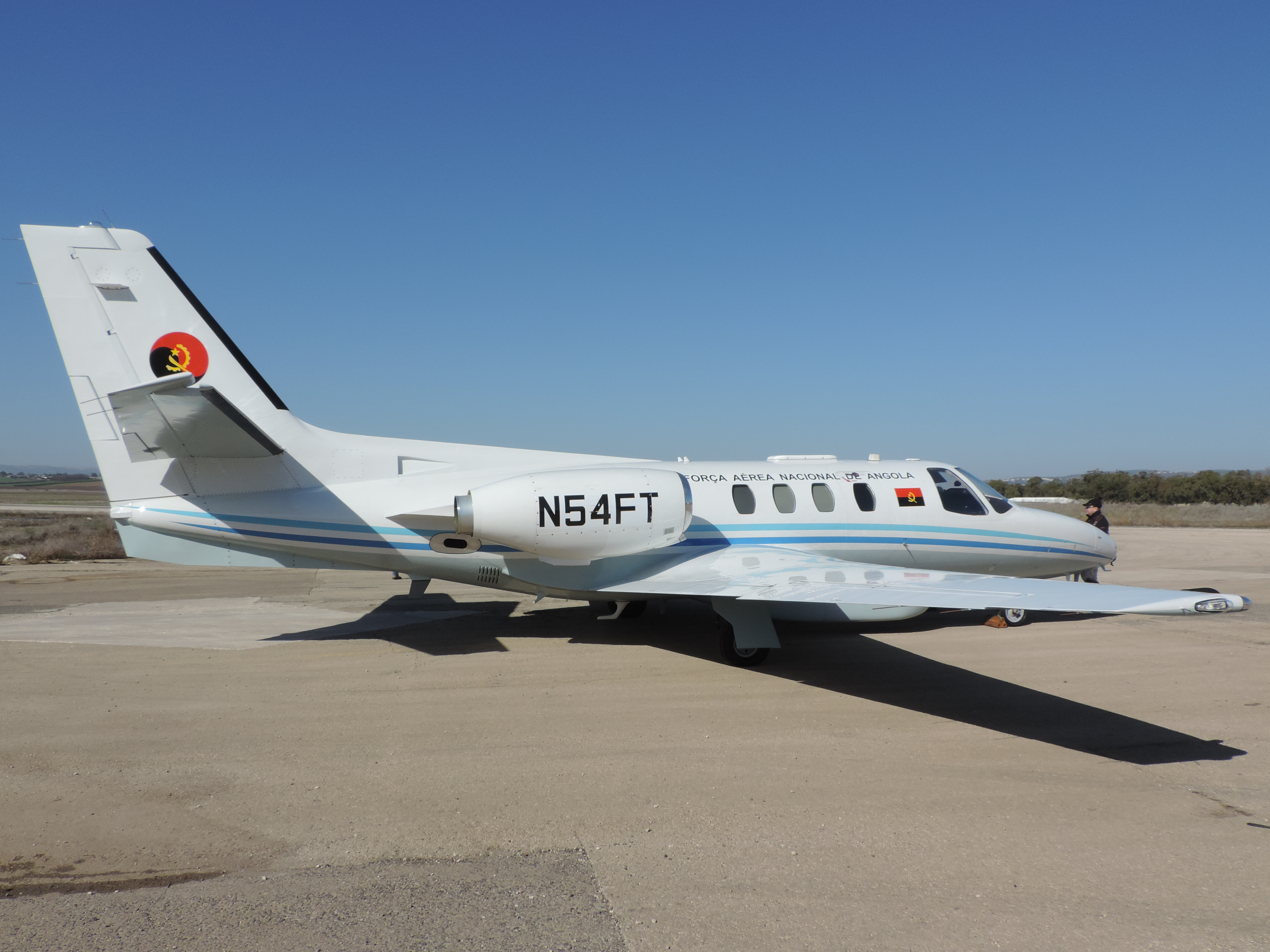
A Cessna 501 used for Maritime Patrol

Aircraft	Origin	Type	Variant	In service	Notes
Combat aircraft
Embraer EMB 314	Brazil	Attack / COIN		6	
MiG-21	Russia	Fighter	MiG-21bis	23	
MiG-23	Russia	Fighter		22	Some supplied by Belarus
Sukhoi Su-22	Russia	Fighter-bomber		10	Some supplied by Belarus
Sukhoi Su-30	Russia	Multirole	Su-30K	12	
Maritime patrol
CASA C-212	Spain	Maritime patrol		1	
Airbus C295	Spain	Maritime patrol	C-295 MSA	2	
Cessna Citation I	United States	Maritime patrol		1	Fitted with a Seaspray AESA radar and electro-optical sensor
Transport
Antonov An-12	Russia	Heavy transport		8	
Antonov An-26	Russia	Transport		1	
Antonov An-32	Russia	Transport		4	
Antonov An-72	Russia	Heavy transport		5	
CASA C-212	Spain	Utility		1	
Airbus C295	Spain	Utility		1	
Daher Kodiak	United States	Utility	Kodiak 100	3	
Ilyushin Il-76	Russia	Strategic airlift		7	
Xi'an MA60	China	Transport		2	
Helicopters
AgustaWestland AW109	Italy	Utility		2	4 on order
AgustaWestland AW139	Italy	SAR / Utility		4	
Alouette III	France	Liaison / Utility		21	
Bell 212	United States	Utility		9	
Mil Mi-17	Russia	Utility		65	
Mil Mi-24	Russia	Attack	Mi-35	14	
Trainer
Aero L-39	Czechoslovakia	Jet trainer		4	
Embraer EMB 312	Brazil	Trainer		12	Aircraft acquired from Peru
Hongdu JL-8	China	Jet trainer	K-8W	12	
Pilatus PC-7	Switzerland	Basic trainer		22	
Pilatus PC-9	Switzerland	Trainer		4	
Sukhoi Su-22	Russia	Conversion trainer		1	
Sukhoi Su-27	Russia	Conversion trainer	Su-27UB	1	
UAV
TAI Aksungur	Turkey	UCAV			Unknown quantity ordered

=== Air defense ===
Name	Origin	Type	In service	Notes
SAM
S-75M Volkhov	Soviet Union	Medium-range surface-to-air missile	40	
2K12 Kub	Soviet Union	Short-range surface-to-air missile	16	Upgraded to 2K12-ML standard
S-125 Pechora	Soviet Union	Short-range surface-to-air missile	12	
9K35 Strela-10	Soviet Union	Short-range surface-to-air missile	10	
9K33 Osa	Soviet Union	Short-range surface-to-air missile	15	
9K31 Strela-1	Soviet Union	Short-range surface-to-air missile	20	

=== Armaments ===
Name	Origin	Type	Notes
Air-to-air missile
K-13	Soviet Union	Infrared homing air-to-air missile	
R-60	Soviet Union	Infrared homing air-to-air missile	
R-73	Soviet Union	Infrared homing air-to-air missile	
R-23	Soviet Union	Semi-active radar homing	
R-27	Soviet Union	Infrared homing air-to-air missile / Semi-active radar homing	
Air-to-surface missile
9M17 Fleyta	Soviet Union	Anti-tank missile	
Anti-radiation missile
Kh-28	Soviet Union	Anti-radiation missile	

== Accidents and incidents ==
On 14 September 2011, an Embraer EMB 120 Brasilia, operated by the Air Force, crashed just after takeoff from Nova Lisboa Airport, killing 11 army officers (including three generals, among them Kalias Pedro) and six civilians. The accident occurred at 11:30 am at the airport, with a military delegation on board the flight at Albano Machado Airport.

== Ranks ==
=== Commissioned officer ranks ===
The rank insignia of commissioned officers.

Rank group	General / flag officers				Senior officers			Junior officers
National Air Force of Angola
National Air Force of Angola	General-de-aviação	General	Tenente-general	Brigadeiro	Coronel	Tenente-coronel	Mayor	Capitão	Tenente	Sub-tenente

=== Other ranks ===
The rank insignia of non-commissioned officers and enlisted personnel.

Rank group	Senior NCOs					Junior NCOs	Enlisted
National Air Force of Angola									No insignia
National Air Force of Angola	Sargento-mor	Sargento-chefe	Sargento-ajudante	Primeiro-sargento	Segundo-sargento	Subsargento	Primeiro-cabo	Segundo-cabo	Soldado
