= Ondjiva Pereira Airport =

Airport in Angola

Ondjiva Pereira Airport Aeroporto 11 de Novembro
- IATA: VPE; ICAO: FNGI

Summary
- Airport type: Public
- Operator: Government
- Serves: Ondjiva
- Elevation AMSL: 3,567 ft / 1,087 m
- Coordinates: 17°2′35″S 15°41′00″E

Map
- Location of Ondjiva Pereira Airport in Angola

Runways
Direction	Length		Surface
Direction	m	ft	Surface
13/31	3,243	10,640	Asphalt
- Source: DAFIF Landings.com Google Maps GCM

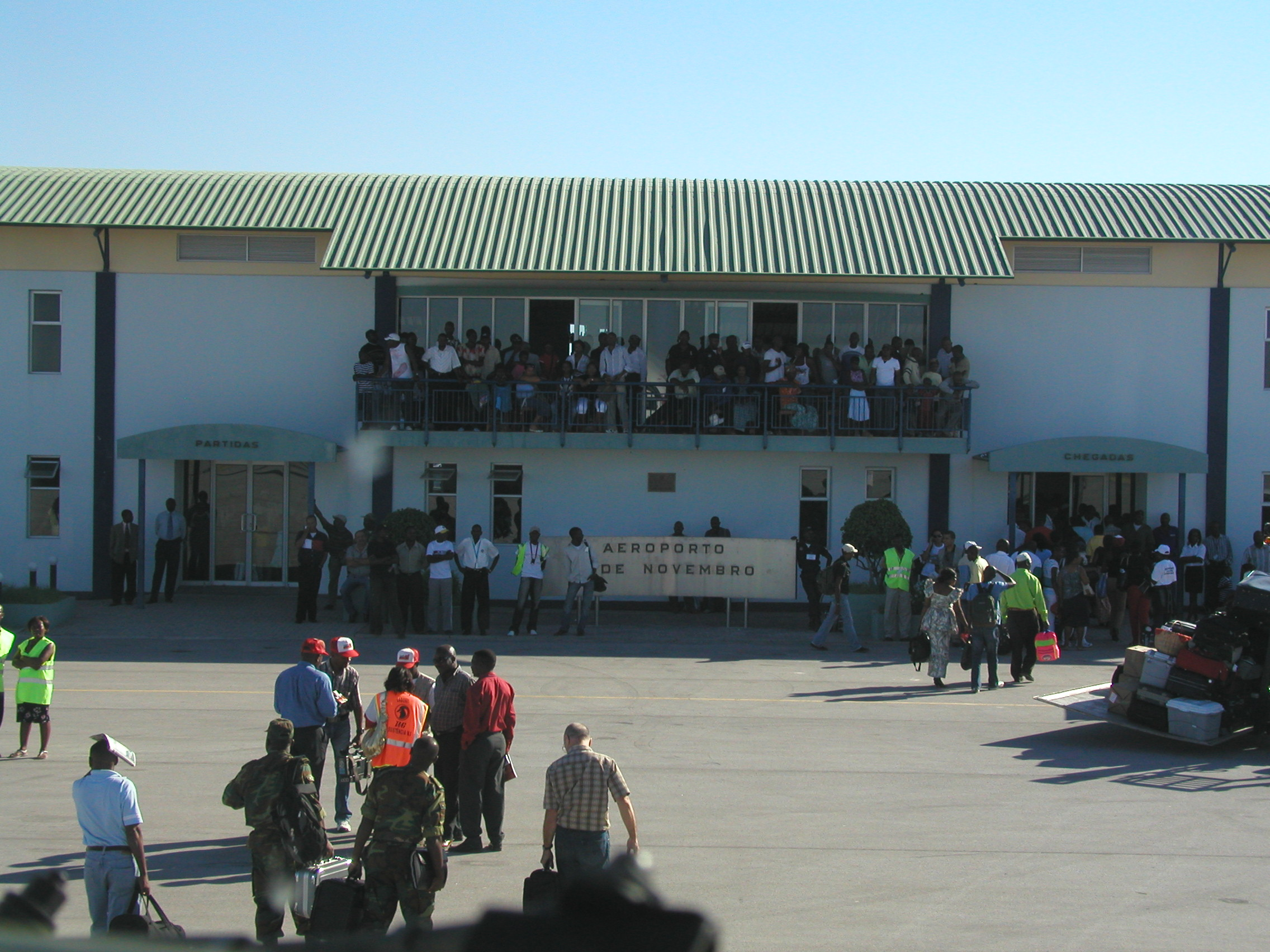
Ondjiva Pereira Airport

Ondjiva Pereira Airport (IATA: VPE, ICAO: FNGI) is an airport serving Ondjiva (alternate spellings: Ongiva, Ngiva, N'giva) in Cunene Province, Angola. The airport is 38 kilometres (24 mi) north of the Namibian border.

The N'giva non-directional beacon (Ident: GI) is located on the field.

== Airlines and destinations ==
Airlines	Destinations
TAAG Angola Airlines	Catumbela, Huambo, Kuito, Luanda, Lubango, Menongue, Moçâmedes

== See also ==
- List of airports in Angola
- Transport in Angola
