= 1983 in aviation =

This is a list of aviation-related events from 1983.

== Events ==
=== January ===
- France agrees to supply Iraq with five Dassault-Breguet Super Étendard strike fighters capable of firing the Exocet anti-ship missile.
- January 1 – Eastern Air Lines makes its first Boeing 757 revenue flight.
- January 2 – In the Iran–Iraq War, Iraqi Air Force aircraft in the Persian Gulf attack a convoy of merchant ships from the Iranian port of Bandar-e Emam Khomeyni, setting fire to the Singaporean cargo ship Eastern and the Liberian cargo ship Orient Horizon, forcing them both to run aground.
- January 5 – United Airlines begins the first scheduled nonstop service between the continental United States and Maui.
- January 16 – The Turkish Airlines Boeing 727-2F2 Afyon, operating as Flight 158, lands short of the runway in driving snow at Esenboğa International Airport in Ankara, Turkey. The plane breaks up and catches fire, killing 47 of the 67 people on board.
- January 18 – The Iraqi Air Force conducts a major raid against civilian and economic targets in Iran, claiming to have dispatched 66 sorties but actually sending more. The raid is made with inadequate fighter escort for attack aircraft and poor crew training in evading Iranian ground antiaircraft defenses, and some aircraft are lost due to insufficient maintenance or because they have been sent to targets that are too far away, causing them to run out of fuel on the way home.
- January 20 – Out on probation for hijacking Northwest Orient Airlines Flight 608 at Seattle-Tacoma International Airport outside Seattle, Washington, in July 1980, 20-year-old Glenn Kurt Tripp again hijacks Northwest Orient Airlines Flight 608, a Boeing 727 with 41 people on board bound for Portland, Oregon. After it takes off from Seattle, he tells a flight attendant that he has bomb in a box he is holding and demands to be flown to Afghanistan, but agrees to allow the airliner to land at Portland to refuel. After three hours of negotiations at Portland, Tripp agrees to allow half the passengers to disembark and while they do, two U.S. Federal Bureau of Investigation agents climb aboard the plane through its cockpit windows and confront Tripp. When Tripp moves as if to throw his box at them, one agent fires a single shot that kills him. The box turns out to contain no explosives.
- January 25–30 – The Islamic Republic of Iran Air Force attacks civilian and economic targets in Iraq.
- January 30 – Sun Country Airlines begins operations.
- January 31
  - Iran has lost 55 aircraft in combat since January 1, while Iraq has lost 80.
  - The Ayres Turbo Thrush Narcotics Eradication Delivery System (NEDS) cropduster plane officially joins the United States' "war on drugs".

=== February ===
- February 1 – Boeing announces it will stop producing Boeing 727 airliners.
- February 7 – The airfield at Sydenham, Belfast, reopens to commercial flights as the Belfast Harbour Airport.
- February 9 – British Airways begins Boeing 757 service.

=== March ===
- March 4–5 – A Cubana de Aviación Ilyushin Il-62M (NATO reporting name "Classic") airliner strays off course and overflies important American buildings two days in a row.
- March 16 – A Boeing 767 lands at Boeing Field in the U.S. State of Washington, after a record breaking non-stop flight from Lisbon, Portugal. The 5,499 miles (8,850 km) flown non-stop constitute a record for twin-engined airliners.
- March 25 – As a consequence of the incidents on March 4 and March 5, the United States Government bans use of American airspace by Cubana de Aviación for 14 days.
- March 28 – The first Boeing 747-300 enters service with Swissair as the launch customer.

=== April ===
- Golden West Airlines goes out of business.
- April 29 – Experiencing a complete loss of power while piloting an AV-8A Harrier vertical take-off and landing (VTOL) fighter during a training flight near Richmond, Virginia, United States Marine Corps pilot Art Nalls opt to glide the plane to a civilian airport, where he makes a deadstick landing, stopping just 50 feet (15 meters) short of the end of the runway. It is history's first deadstick landing of any version of the Harrier, and Nalls is awarded the Air Medal for the achievement.

=== May ===
- May 1 – Two Israeli Air Force aircraft — a 106 Squadron F-15D Eagle on a training flight and a 110 Squadron A-4 Skyhawk — collide over the Negev Desert. The A-4 crashes, but its pilot ejects and survives. The F-15D's right wing is sheared off about 60 cm (2 feet) from its root, but its pilot takes advantage of its abundant engine thrust and the lift generated by its fuselage — allowing the fuselage to act as a lifting body — to make an emergency landing at Ramon Airbase, touching down at twice the normal landing speed and bringing the F-15D to a stop only 20 feet (6.1 metres) from the end of the runway. The F-15D's crew survives, and the F-15D is repaired and returned to service.
- May 5 – Eastern Air Lines Flight 855, a Lockheed L-1011 TriStar with 172 people on board, experiences the involuntary shutdown of all three engines in mid-air over the Atlantic Ocean during a flight from Miami International Airport to Nassau International Airport in the Bahamas. The pilot, Richard Boddy, barely avoids disaster when he is able to restart one engine and land safely at Miami International Airport.
- May 15 – Iraqi aircraft make a missile attack on the Panamanian oil tanker Pan Oceanic Sane, setting her on fire. Her crew abandons her in the channel at Bandar-e Emam Khomeyni, Iran.
- May 22 – During an air show at Rhein-Main Air Base in Frankfurt-am-Main, West Germany, a Canadian Forces CF-104 Starfighter (serial number 104813) of 439 Squadron explodes in mid-air. Although its pilot ejects safely, its wreckage falls on a nearby road and hits a car carrying five people, killing three adults and two children. The sixth passenger in the car dies months later of burns suffered in the accident.
- May 25 – Iraqi aircraft attack the Panamanian platform supply vessel Seatrans-21 in the Persian Gulf, inflicting slight damage on her.
- May 26
  - A Learjet 55 sets a world speed record in its class of 448 mph (721 km/h) over the 5,655 miles (9,101 km) between Los Angeles, California, and Paris - Le Bourget Airport, France.
  - People Express Airlines inaugurates its first international service, flying a Boeing 747-227B between Newark International Airport in New Jersey and Gatwick Airport in London.
- May 31 – A missile attack by Iraqi aircraft in the Persian Gulf near the Iranian port of Bandar-e Emam Khomeyni seriously damages the Indian bulk carrier Ati Priti.

=== June ===
- June 1 – Singapore Airlines announces it has bought six Boeing 747-300s and four Boeing 757s, making it the first Asian airline to buy the 757.
- June 2 – Air Canada Flight 797, a McDonnell Douglas DC-9-32, experiences an in-flight fire and makes an emergency landing at Cincinnati/Northern Kentucky International Airport in Hebron, Kentucky. When the plane's doors are opened on the ground, a fire flashover occurs, killing 23 and injuring 16 of the 46 people on board; Canadian folk musician and songwriter Stan Rogers is among the dead. The accident prompts the installation of smoke detectors and emergency lighting leading to exits aboard airliners, as well as increased firefighting training and equipment for airline crews.
- June 6 – Flying a Sea Harrier with a defective radio, dangerously low on fuel, and unable to find his way back to his aircraft carrier, HMS Illustrious, Royal Navy Sub-Lieutenant Ian Watson makes an emergency landing on the Spanish cargo ship Alraigo in the Atlantic Ocean off the coast of Portugal, with his Sea Harrier coming to rest partly on a shipping container but with its tail on Alraigo's deck. After Alraigo arrives at Santa Cruz de Tenerife in the Canary Islands on 10 June, her crew and owners file a salvage claim, and they later are awarded £570,000 ($1,140,000).
- June 8 – The propeller detaches from the No. 4 engine of Reeve Aleutian Airways Flight 8 – a Lockheed L-188C Electra with 10 passengers and a crew of five on board – shortly after takeoff from Cold Bay Airport in Cold Bay, Alaska, for a flight to Seattle, Washington, causing damage that depressurizes the plane and jams its flight controls and engine throttles. Through use of the autopilot and gradual loosening of the flight controls and by shutting down the engines upon touchdown and rolling to an unpowered stop, the crew manages to land the aircraft safely at Anchorage International Airport in Anchorage Alaska, without injury to anyone or any further damage to the airliner.
- June 11 – The first aircraft carrier designed as such to be built in Italy, Giuseppe Garibaldi, is launched by Italcantieri at Monfalcone.
- June 24 – The Space Shuttle Challenger glides to a landing at Edwards Air Force Base, California, bringing the first American woman in space, astronaut Sally K. Ride, back to Earth.
- June 27 – Ballooning record-setter Maxie Anderson and his co-pilot Don Ida die in a balloon accident near Bad Brückenau, West Germany, during the 1983 Gordon Bennett Cup balloon race.

=== July ===
- July 1
  - A North Korean Ilyushin Il-62M en route Conakry Airport in Guinea crashes into the Fouta Djall Mountains in Guinea-Bissau, killing all 23 people on board.
  - Iraqi Foreign Minister Tariq Aziz warns that Iraq will begin to attack economic targets in Iran if Iran does not halt such attacks on Iraq.
  - The Soviet Union cancels the Tupolev Tu-144 supersonic transport program after the Tu-144 has made 102 commercial flights since entering service with Aeroflot in December 1975. The Soviet government also provides for the future use of the remaining Tu-144s as airborne laboratories.
- July 7 – A standard production Learjet 55 sets six time-to-climb records.
- July 8 – General Dynamics rolls out the 1,000th F-16 Fighting Falcon.
- July 11 – The TAME Boeing 737-2V2 Advanced Ciudad de Loja, flying over a mountainous region in heavy fog with an unqualified flight crew, crashes into a mountain while on final approach to a landing at Mariscal Lamar Airport in Cuenca, Ecuador, killing all 119 people on board. It is TAME's first crash and remains its deadliest; the crash also remains the deadliest aviation accident in the history of Ecuador.
- July 15 – A bomb planted in a suitcase by the Armenian Secret Army for the Liberation of Armenia (ASALA) explodes at the Turkish Airlines check-in counter at Paris-Orly Airport in Paris, France, killing eight people and injuring 55.
- July 16 – A British Airways Sikorsky S-61 helicopter crashes in thick fog in the southern Celtic Sea near St Mary's in the Isles of Scilly, killing 20 of the 26 people on board in the deadliest civilian helicopter accident in the United Kingdom prior to 1986.
- July 22 – Dick Smith achieves the first solo circumnavigation of the globe in a helicopter. Smith makes the 56,742-kilometre (35,258 mi) journey in stages using a bell Jetranger III named Australian Explorer.
- July 23 – Air Canada Flight 143, a Boeing 767-200 with 69 people on board, runs out of fuel over Canada at an altitude of 41,000 feet (12,000 m) during a flight from Ottawa, Ontario, to Edmonton, Alberta. Its flight crew glides the aircraft to a landing at Gimli, Manitoba. All on board survive, and only 10 suffer minor injuries. The aircraft involved returns to service and is nicknamed the "Gimli Glider."

=== August ===
- August 1 – America West Airlines begins flying, operating from Phoenix, Arizona.
- August 12 – Iraq declares a formal "exclusion zone" in the Persian Gulf in which ships are subject to attack by the Iraqi Air Force and Iraqi Navy.
- August 15 – Iraq warns foreign merchant ships to keep clear of Iranian waters or risk attack.
- August 21 – Former Philippine Senator Benigno "Ninoy" Aquino Jr., a political opponent of President of the Philippines Ferdinand Marcos, returns to the Philippines from a self-imposed exile, arriving at Manila International Airport in Manila aboard China Airlines Flight 811 from Taiwan. He is arrested by Philippine soldiers aboard the airliner immediately after it arrives, and less than a minute later is shot to death on the tarmac, as is Communist hitman Roland Galman, who is shot by several members of Aquino's military escort immediately after Aquino's assassination.
- August 24 – A Canadair Challenger 601 business jet arrives at London, England, from Calgary, Alberta, Canada, setting a world non-stop distance record for a business jet of 4,364.2 miles (7,023.5 km).
- August 30 – Aeroflot Flight 5463, a Tupolev Tu-134A (NATO reporting name "Crusty"), crashes into Dolan Mountain while approaching the Almaty airport in the Soviet Union's Kazakh Soviet Socialist Republic, killing all 90 people aboard.

=== September ===
- Late in the month, Iraq takes delivery from France of five Dassault-Breguet Super Étendard strike fighters capable of firing the Exocet anti-ship missile in accordance with their January 1983 agreement. They will begin combat operations in March 1984.
- September 1 – Soviet National Air Defense Forces Sukhoi Su-15 fighters shoot down Korean Air Flight 007, a Boeing 747-230B, killing all 269 people on board. Larry McDonald, a member of the United States House of Representatives representing Georgia's 7th congressional district, is among the dead. According to investigators, the Korean Air plane had strayed off course and into Soviet airspace near Sakhalin Island, and the attacking Soviet pilots claim it had ignored warnings before they shot it down.
- September 23
  - A bomb planted by the Abu Nidal organization explodes in the baggage compartment of Gulf Air Flight 771, a Boeing 737-200. The airliner crashes near Mina Jebel Ali in the United Arab Emirates, killing all 112 people on board.
  - Continental Airlines enters Chapter 11 bankruptcy.

=== October ===
- October 2 – During an Iranian offensive, Iraq apparently experiments with the use of Mil Mi-8 (NATO reporting name "Hip") helicopters and Soviet-made attack aircraft to drop mustard gas.
- October 9 – Iraq confirms that it has taken delivery from France of five Dassault-Breguet Super Étendard strike fighters.
- October 11; A Lufthansa Boeing 747 plane carrying cargo crash lands at Hong Kong Kai take airport. The plane ends up on the grass and is seriously damaged. There are no deaths.
- October 18 – Pan American World Airways and American Airlines announce they will trade aircraft; Pan Am will send 15 McDonnell Douglas DC-10s to American in exchange for eight Boeing 747s. It is the first time in history two airlines agree to a swap.
- October 24 – The Iraqi Air Force has flown up to 122 sorties per day in opposing a successful Iranian ground offensive.
- October 25 – Iraq again apparently experiments with the dropping of mustard gas on Iranian forces by Mi-8 helicopters and attack aircraft.
- October 26 – Pan American World Airways celebrates the 25th anniversary of its first Boeing 707 flight with a 707 flight from John F. Kennedy International Airport in New York, New York, to Paris, France.
- October 31 – Iraqi aircraft make a missile attack against a convoy of merchant ships escorted by Islamic Republic of Iran Navy vessels in the Persian Gulf near the Iranian port of Bandar-e Emam Khomeyni, causing a fire aboard the Greek cargo ship Avra.

=== November ===
- Trans World Airlines is spun off from Trans World Corporation as a new public company.
- November 8 – A TAAG Angola Airlines Boeing 737-200 crashes just after takeoff from Lubango Airport in Lubango, Angola, killing all 130 people on board. Angolan authorities identify technical failure as the cause, but the UNITA guerrilla group claims to have shot down the airliner with a surface-to-air missile.
- November 9–11 – During the last three days of the North Atlantic Treaty Organization's Able Archer 83 command post exercise, the Soviet Union places its forces on alert – including Sukhoi Su-24 (NATO reporting name "Fencer") bombers of the Soviet Air Force's 4th Air Army at cockpit readiness – out of fear that NATO is about to attack the Warsaw Pact. It is the closest that the world comes to the outbreak of a nuclear war between the Cuban Missile Crisis on 1962 and the end of the Cold War in 1991.
- November 11 – A bilateral air traffic agreement between Peru and the United States expires. Its expiration and disagreements between the two countries over "fifth freedom rights" – which allow an airline to carry revenue traffic between foreign countries as a part of services connecting the airline's own country – will lead to the suspension of commercial air traffic between the two countries from May 1984 to mid-1985.
- November 18–19 – Seven young Georgians hijack Aeroflot Flight 6833, a Tupolev Tu-134A with 57 people on board, in an attempt to force it to fly them to Turkey. The aircraft's pilot and co-pilot refuse to meet their demands and use sharp maneuvers to spoil the hijackers' aim and force them out of the cockpit, and several people are injured in a clash between the hijackers and the other people on the plane. The plane circles, then lands at Tbilisi in the Soviet Union, where on the next day the KGB's counterterrorist Spetsnaz Alpha Group storms it, killing three crew members, two passengers, and three hijackers.
- November 21 – Iraqi aircraft make a missile attack against a convoy of merchant ships escorted by Islamic Republic of Iran Navy vessels in the Persian Gulf near the Iranian port of Bandar-e Emam Khomeyni, sinking the 13,000-gross-ton Greek bulk carrier Antigoni.
- November 27 – Avianca Flight 011, a Boeing 747-283B, crashes into a hill while descending for a landing at Madrid, Spain, killing 181 of the 192 people on board. Among the dead are Mexican novelist and playwright Jorge Ibargüengoitia, Uruguayan writer, academic, and literary critic Ángel Rama, Peruvian novelist, poet, and political activist Manuel Scorza, and Argentinian art critic Marta Traba.

=== December ===
- December 4
  - In reprisal for an attack on United States military bases in Beirut, Lebanon, 28 United States Navy A-6 Intruders attack suspected terrorist bases in Libya.
  - Wanted for hijacking a Chalk's International Airlines Grumman G-73 Mallard amphibian from Florida to Havana, Cuba, in March 1972, Black Liberation Army member Joseph Terron Bennett finally is arrested for the crime, in Des Moines, Iowa. He had returned secretly to the United States from Cuba in 1982.
- December 7 – A disaster occurs at Madrid–Barajas Airport in Madrid, Spain, when the Iberia Boeing 727-256 Advanced Jumila (registration EC-CFJ) collides during its takeoff roll with the Aviaco Douglas DC-9-32 Vasco Núñez de Balboa (registration EC-CGS), which had made a wrong turn onto the runway while taxiing in fog. Both aircraft catch fire and are destroyed, killing all 42 people aboard the DC-9 and 51 of the 93 people aboard the Boeing 727. Mexican actress Fanny Cano is among the dead on the DC-9, and South African pianist Marc Raubenheimer is killed on the Boeing 727.
- December 8 – Iraqi aircraft make a missile attack in the Persian Gulf, damaging the 16,000-gross-ton Greek bulk carrier Iapetos near the Iranian port of Bandar-e Emam Khomeyni. The crew of Iapetos abandons her, but she later is repaired.
- December 9 – Delta Air Lines receives the 1,000th production Boeing 737 at Boeing's headquarters.
- December 12 – Memphis State University football coach Rex Dockery and all three others aboard die in the crash of a Piper PA-34-200T Seneca during a landing attempt in rain and darkness at Lawrenceburg, Tennessee.
- December 20 – Ozark Air Lines Flight 650, a McDonnell Douglas DC-9-31, strikes a snow plow on the runway while landing during a snowstorm at Sioux Falls Regional Airport at Sioux Falls, South Dakota. The collision rips off the airliner's right wing and starts a fire, causing a fireball to engulf the snow plow, killing its driver. No one aboard the airliner dies, although two flight attendants suffer minor injuries during the emergency evacuation of the aircraft.
- December 24 – Aeroflot Flight 601 crashes at Leshukonskoye Airport, killing 44 people on board.

== First flights ==
=== January ===
- January 14 – Gulfstream Peregrine
- January 25 – Saab 340 SE-ISF

=== April ===
- April 21 – Mooney 301
- April 25 – Dornier Do 24TT D-CATD

=== June ===
- HALSOL ("High-Altitude Solar") unmanned aerial vehicle (UAV) prototype
- June 17 – Robin ATL
- June 20 – de Havilland Canada Dash 8 C-GDNK

=== July ===
- July 27 – Embraer EMB 120 Brasilia PT-ZBA

=== August ===
- August 23 – Boeing Skyfox
- August 23 – Trago Mills SAH-1
- August 29 – Beech Model 115 Starship 85% scale proof-of-concept prototype

=== September ===
- September 11 – Agusta A129 Mangusta MM590
- September 22 – Reims-Cessna F406 Caravan II

=== October ===
- October 6 – Bell OH-58D Kiowa (Bell Model 406)

=== November ===
- November 11 – CASA CN-235

== Entered service ==
- Skyhigh Skybaby

=== January ===
- January 1 – Boeing 757 with Eastern Air Lines

=== March ===
- March 23 - Boeing 747-300 with Swissair.

=== April ===
- Airbus A310 with Lufthansa and Swissair

=== May ===
- May 10 – Westland 30 with Airspur Helicopters.

=== November ===
- F/A-18A and F/A-18B Hornet with United States Navy

== Retirements ==
- Beck-Mahoney Sorceress

== Deadliest crash ==
The deadliest crash of this year was Korean Air Lines Flight 007, a Boeing 747 which was shot down over the Sea of Japan near Sakhalin Island, Russian SFSR on 1 September, killing all 269 people on board.
