= Albano Machado Airport =

Airport in Angola

Albano Machado (Huambo) Airport Nova Lisboa Airport
- IATA: NOV; ICAO: FNHU

Summary
- Airport type: Public
- Serves: Huambo
- Elevation AMSL: 5,587 ft / 1,703 m
- Coordinates: 12°48′30″S 15°45′30″E

Map
- Location of Airport in Angola

Runways
Direction	Length		Surface
Direction	m	ft	Surface
11/29	2,660	8,727	Asphalt
- Source: WAD GCM Landings.com

The Albano Machado Airport (IATA: NOV, ICAO: FNHU) is a public airport southeast of Huambo, the capital of Huambo Province, Angola. It was formerly named Nova Lisboa Airport, after the former name of the city.

== Airlines and destinations ==
Airlines	Destinations
TAAG Angola Airlines	Catumbela, Luanda, Lubango, Menongue, Ondjiva

During July and August 1975, the airport operated as a bridge between Angola and Lisbon while the Angolan Civil War raged around the city. Several airlines operated special flights into the city: Swissair (Douglas DC-10), Transinternational Airlines (Douglas DC-8), TAP Air Portugal (Boeing 707s, 747), Perfect Tours (Boeing 707), and Overseas National Airways (DC-8).

== Accidents and incidents ==
- On 3 September 1970. Douglas DC-3 G-AVPW of Hunting Surveys was substantially damaged when it was subjected to ground fire on take-off. Hydraulic lines were damaged and the fuel tanks ruptured. A successful emergency landing was made at Luanda Airport. The aircraft was repaired and returned to service.
- On 14 September 2011, 17 people, including 11 military personnel, died when an Angolan Air Force EMB-120 crashed shortly after take-off from Albano Machado airport. The plane was headed to Luanda Airport.

== See also ==
- List of airports in Angola
- Transport in Angola

== Gallery ==
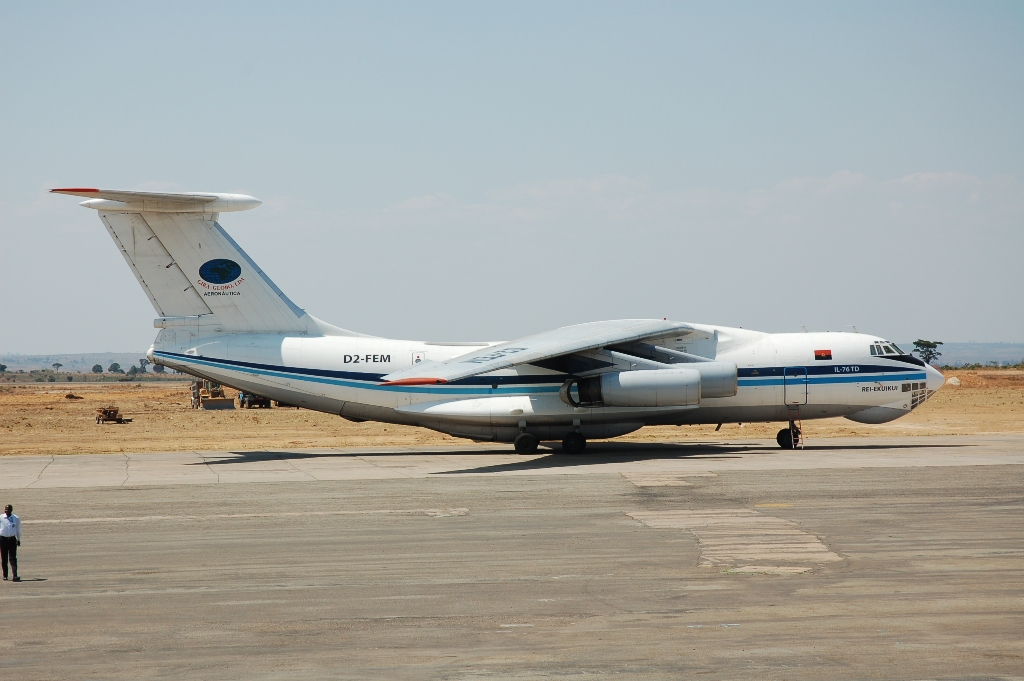
IL 76 at Huambo Airport in 2007

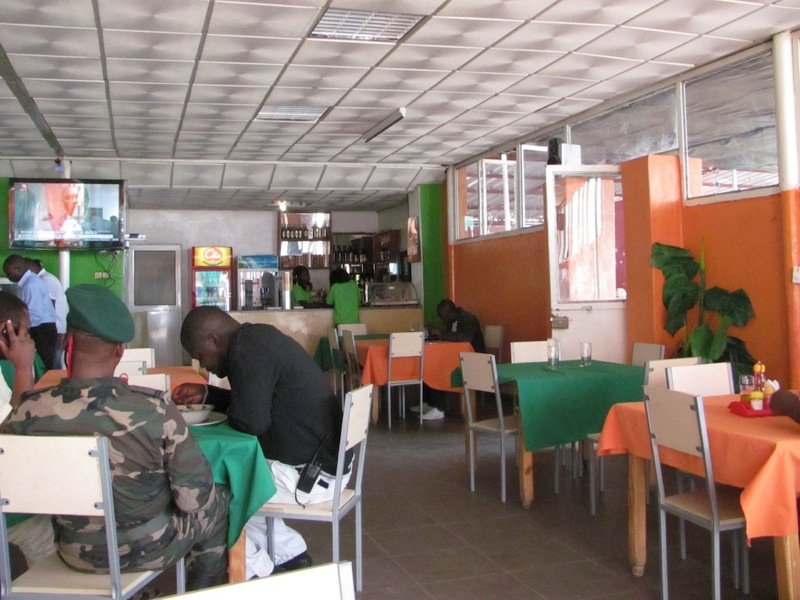
Airport restaurant

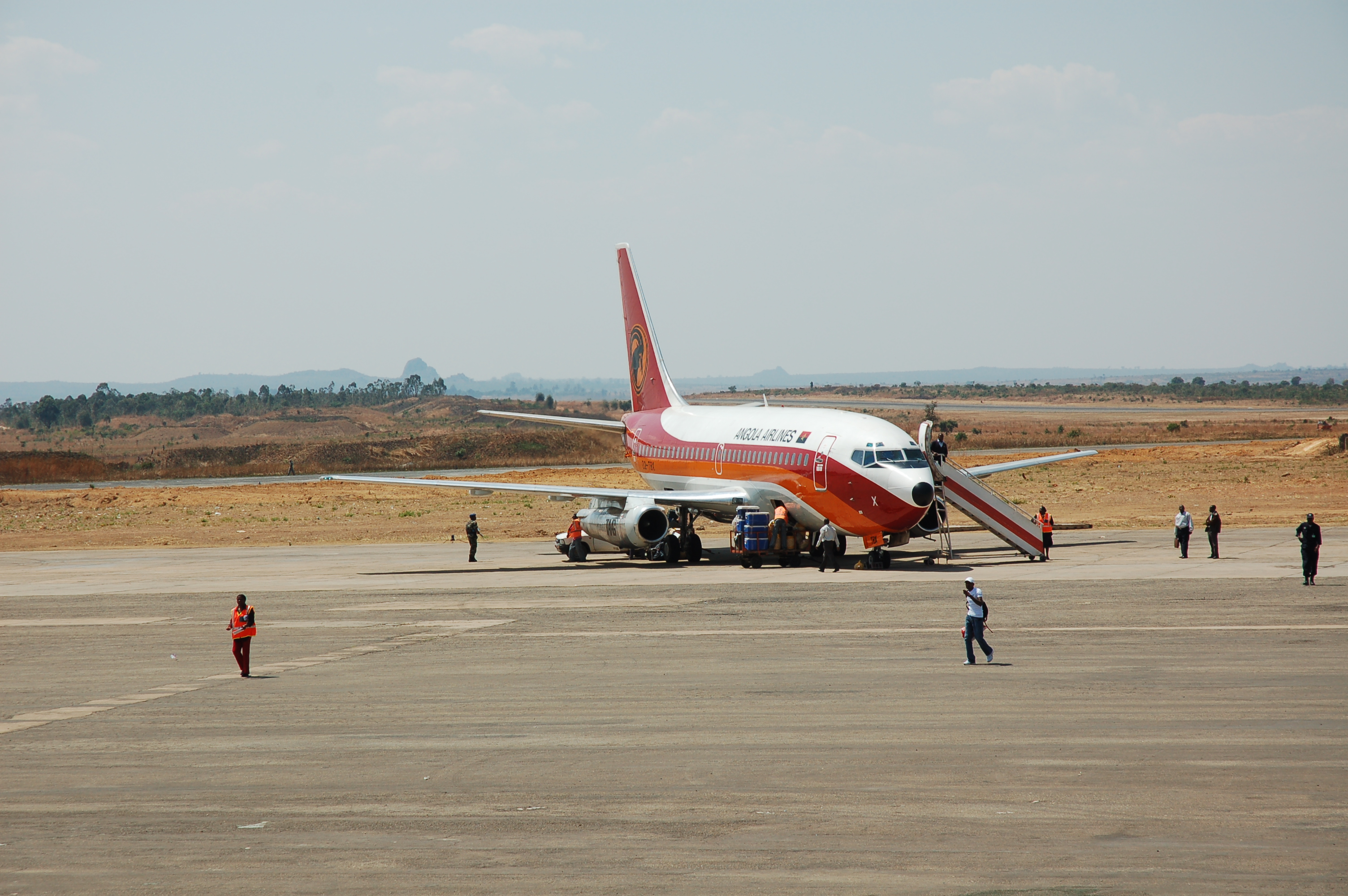
TAAG Boing 737-200 ready for boarding in 2007

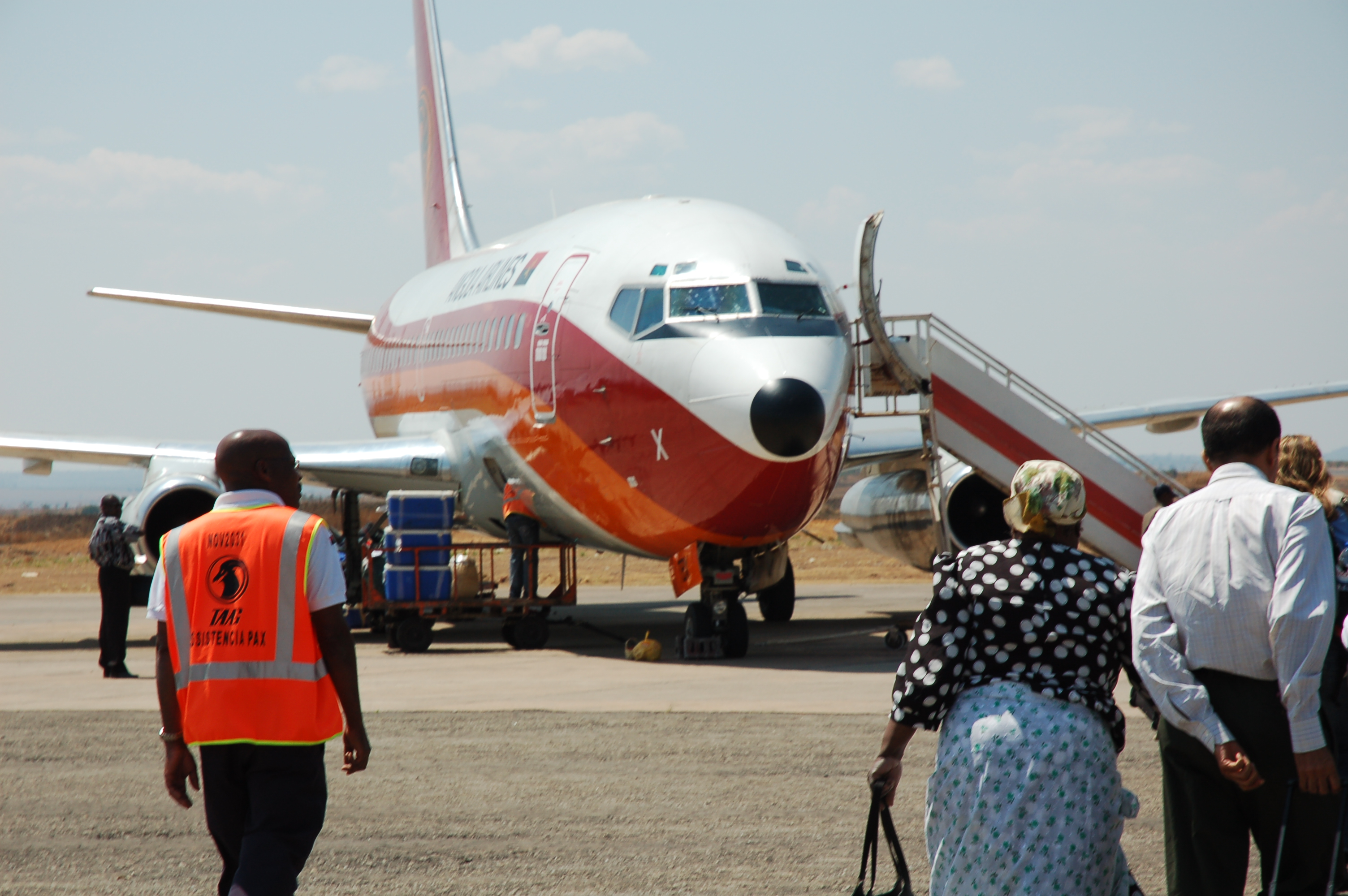
Boarding TAAG 737-200 in 2007

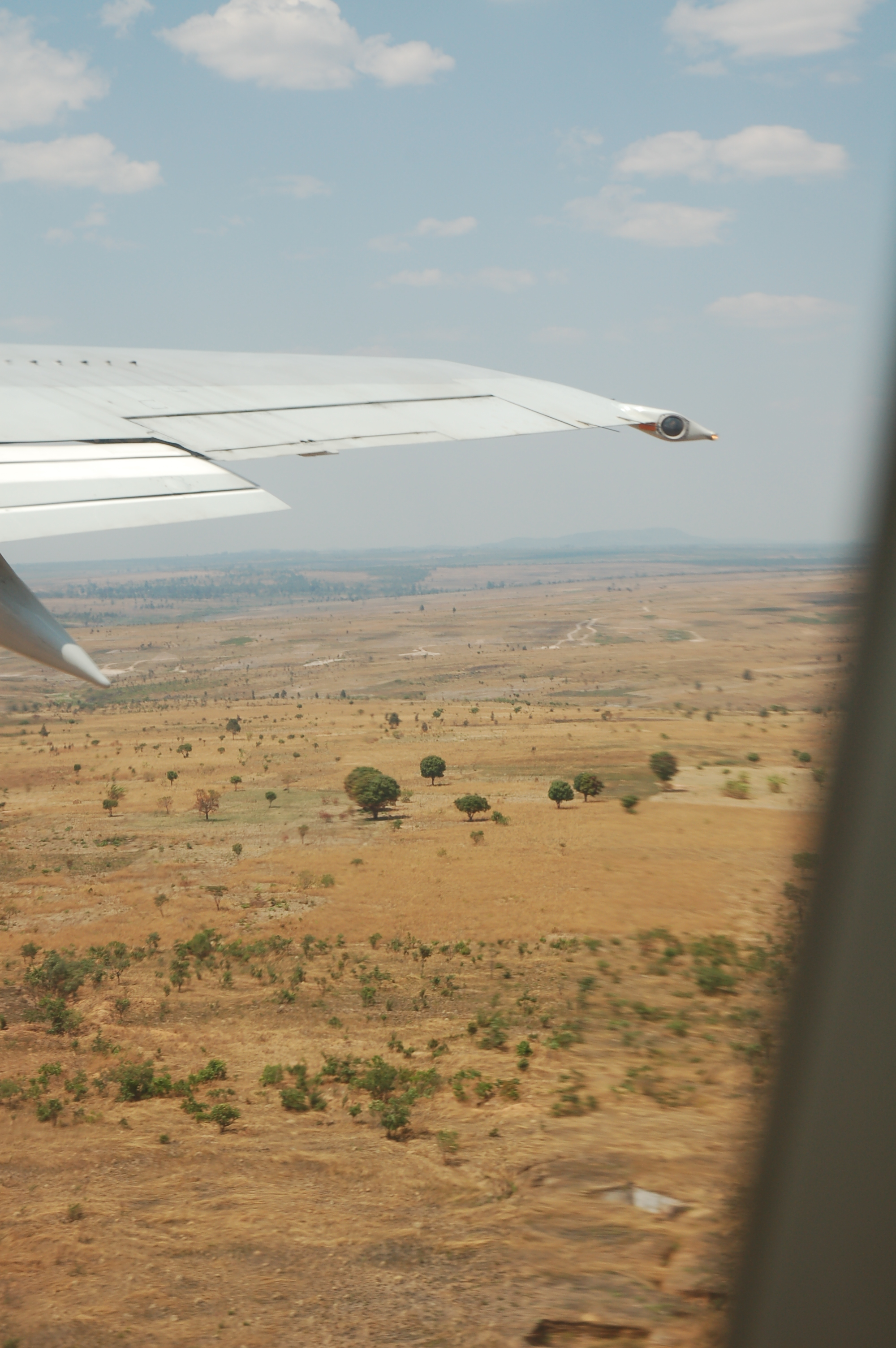
Departing Huambo
