= Kalias Pedro =

Elias Malungo Bravo da Costa Pedro (died 14 September 2011), more commonly known by his nom de guerre Kalias, was a lieutenant general of the Angolan Armed Forces.

== Angolan Civil War ==
During the Angolan Civil War Pedro fought on the side of UNITA as a military leader in the country's interior. He was part of the so-called "third generation" of UNITA leaders brought up within the organization and educated inside Angola and abroad on UNITA scholarships, along with Azevedo Kanganje, Adélio Chitekulo, Jorge Sanguende, Adalberto da Costa Jr., and Jardo Muekalia. He had a sister, Domingas Pedro, who was reportedly close to UNITA leader Jonas Savimbi.

In 1992, while holding the rank of brigadier, Pedro was named as the UNITA representative to the joint commission overseeing the implementation of the Tripartite Accord, which included the integration of UNITA troops into the government army. By 1999 he was already described as "a member of Savimbi's inner circle". In 2000, his military responsibilities increased, and he linked up with other high-level UNITA figures such as Abilio Kamalata. He was the director of Savimbi's office. Following Savimbi's death in February 2002, there were some reports that he had been captured by government troops. He was one of the UNITA leaders who participated in the meetings which led to the 2002 ceasefire.

== Post-war ==
In April 2003, Pedro was named head of the army's Office of Communication and Image (Gabinete de Comunicação e Imagem) under the Principal Directorate of Patriotic Education (Direcção Principal de Educação Patriótica). In July 2008, while still holding that same position, he appeared before the Supreme Military Tribunal on charges of assaulting a civilian during an altercation in 2003; the complainant, a man with alleged links to the Angolan intelligence service, had stated to Pedro that he and other UNITA members deserved to share the same fate as Savimbi (who had been killed in combat). In December 2009, he received Gen. Godfrey Ngwenya of South Africa at the airport when the latter came to Angola for a four-day visit to meet Angolan Armed Forces officers. He was killed in the 2011 Angolan Air Force crash along with Lt. Gen. Lelo Kizua. He was buried in a family cemetery in his home province of Benguela.
