= TAAG Flight 462 =

1983 aviation incident

Coordinates: 14°55′30″S 13°34′30″E

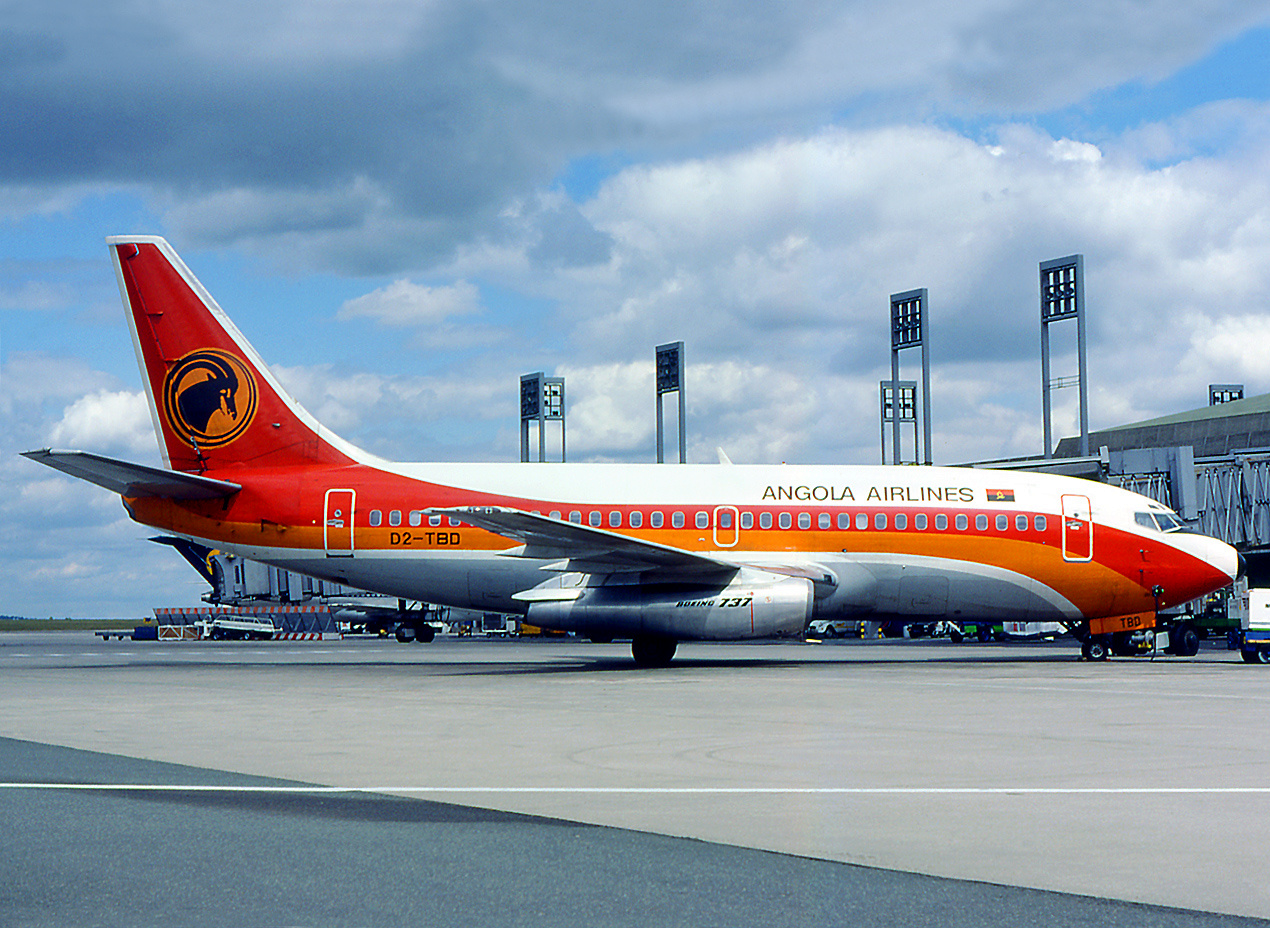
- A TAAG Angola Airlines Boeing 737-200 similar to the one involved.

Incident
- Date: 8 November 1983
- Summary: Mechanical failure
- Site: Near Lubango Airport, Lubango, Angola

Aircraft
- Aircraft type: Boeing 737-200
- Operator: TAAG Angola Airlines
- Registration: D2-TBN
- Flight origin: Lubango Airport, Lubango, Angola
- Destination: Quatro de Fevereiro Airport, Luanda, Angola
- Occupants: 130
- Passengers: 126
- Crew: 4
- Fatalities: 130
- Survivors: 0

TAAG Flight 462 was a TAAG Angola Airlines flight which crashed just after the Boeing 737-200 took off from Lubango Airport in Lubango, Angola, on a regular domestic service as Flight DT 462 to Quatro de Fevereiro Airport in Luanda on November 8, 1983. All 130 occupants onboard were killed.

== Aircraft ==
The aircraft involved was a one-year-old Boeing 737-2M2 registered as D2-TBN with serial number 869. The aircraft was powered by two Pratt & Whitney JT8D-17 turbofan engines.

== Crash ==
The Boeing 737 was operating as Flight DT 462. The aircraft was at 200 feet (61 m) and climbing when it began to descend and turn left. The left wingtip hit the ground, and the aircraft broke apart and burst into flames. The wreckage came to rest 800 metres (2,600 ft) from the end of the runway at Lubango Airport. The crash killed all 130 people on board.

== Probable cause ==
UNITA guerrillas claimed to have shot down the aircraft, which they believed to be carrying only military personnel, with a surface-to-air missile to protest Angola's government. Post-crash investigation of the aircraft's wreckage by the Angolan authorities reported no conclusive evidence of missile damage, and the cause of the crash is officially considered to be a mechanical failure.
