= Luena Airport =

Airport in Moxico, Angola

Luena Airport Aeroporto de Luena
- IATA: LUO; ICAO: FNUE

Summary
- Airport type: Public
- Operator: Government
- Serves: Luena
- Elevation AMSL: 4,446 ft (1,355 m)
- Coordinates: 11°46′05″S 19°53′50″E

Map
- Location of Airport in Angola

Runways
Direction	Length		Surface
Direction	m	ft	Surface
11/29	3,350	10,991	Asphalt
- Source: DAFIF GCM Landings.com

Luena Airport (Portuguese: Aeroporto de Luena) (IATA: LUO, ICAO: FNUE) is an airport serving Luena, the capital of the Moxico Province in Angola.

== Airlines and destinations ==
Airlines	Destinations
TAAG Angola Airlines	Luanda–Neto

== Facilities ==
The airport has a small and modern terminal building built to replace an older terminal. The control tower is now located next the terminal (the old tower was atop the old terminal building). Hangars and other airport buildings are located next to the main terminal building.

== See also ==
- List of airports in Angola
- Transport in Angola
