= Benguela Airport =

Airport in Benguela, Angola

Benguela Airport Gen. V. Deslandes Airport
- IATA: BUG; ICAO: FNBG

Summary
- Airport type: Public
- Operator: Government
- Serves: Benguela, Angola
- Elevation AMSL: 118 ft / 36 m
- Coordinates: 12°36′30″S 13°24′10″E

Map
- Location of airport in Angola

Runways
Direction	Length		Surface
Direction	m	ft	Surface
14/32	1,597	5,240	Asphalt
- Source: GCM Landings.com Google Maps

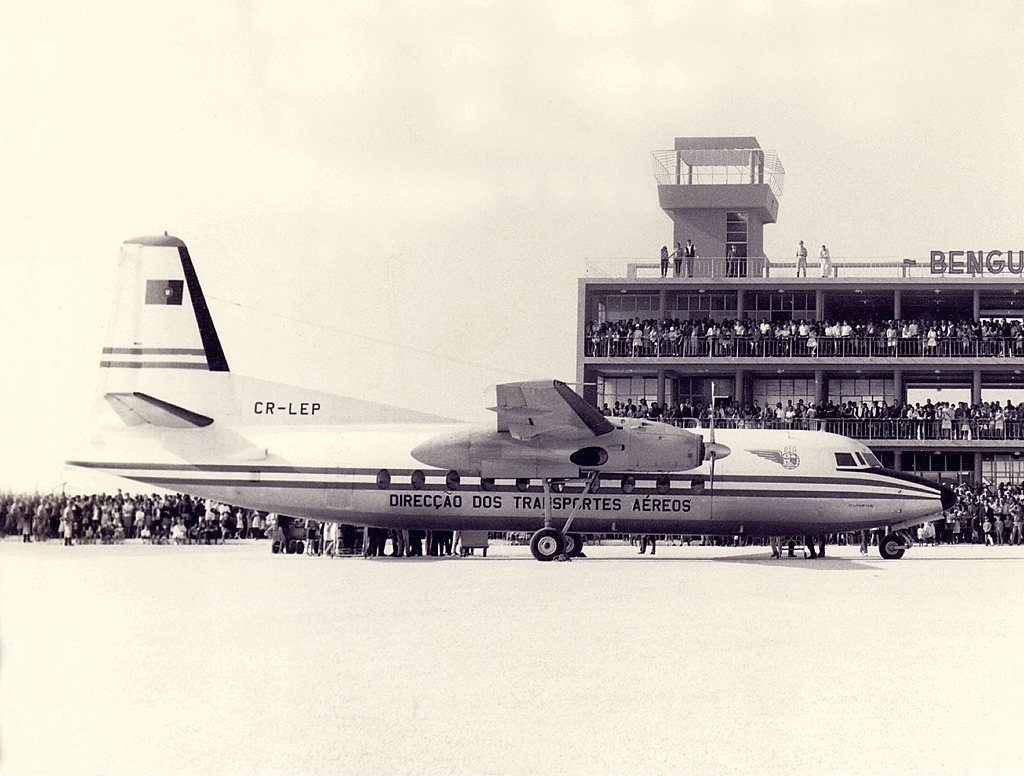
A Fokker F-27-200 airplane sits at Benguela Airport.

Benguela Airport (Portuguese: Aeroporto de Benguela - 17 de Setembro) (IATA: BUG, ICAO: FNBG) is an airport serving Benguela, the capital city of Benguela Province in Angola.

The Benguela non-directional beacon (Ident: BG) is located on the field.

== Airline and destination ==
Airlines	Destinations
Fly Angola	Luanda, Windhoek–Hosea Kutako

== See also ==
- List of airports in Angola
- Transport in Angola
