= Catumbela Airport =

Airport in Catumbela, Angola

Catumbela Airport Aeroporto da Catumbela
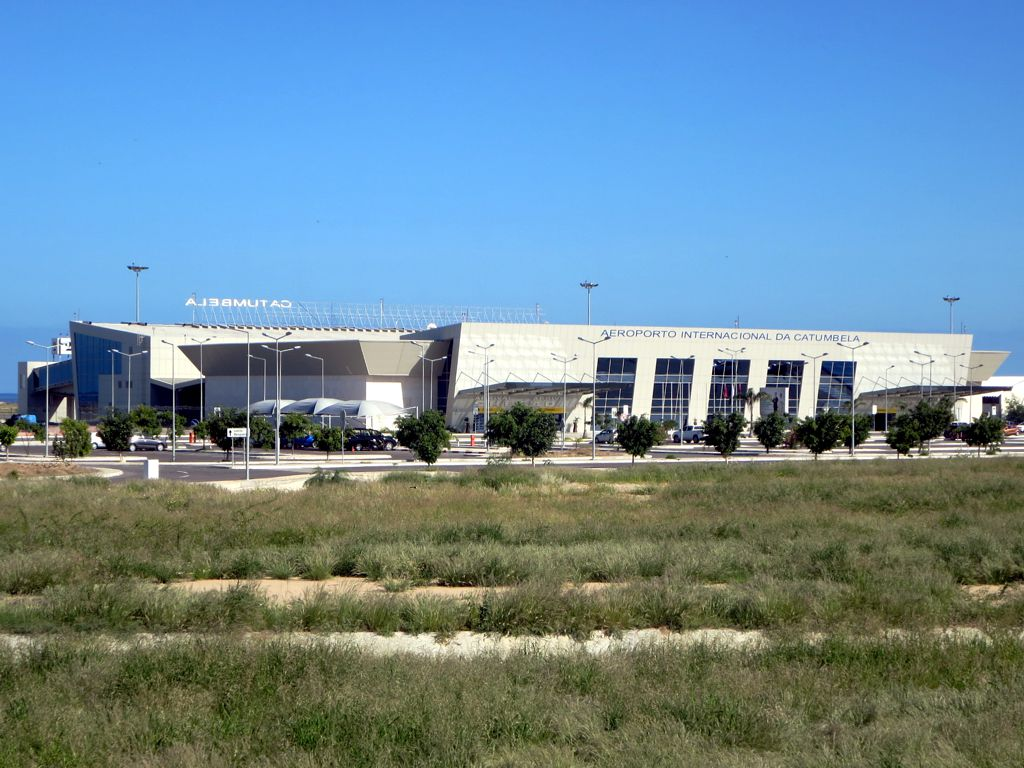
- IATA: CBT; ICAO: FNCT

Summary
- Airport type: Civil/military
- Operator: ENANA
- Serves: Catumbela
- Elevation AMSL: 23 ft / 7 m
- Coordinates: 12°28′45″S 013°29′15″E

Map
- Location of the airport in Angola

Runways
Direction	Length		Surface
Direction	m	ft	Surface
02/20	3,700	12,139	Asphalt
- Sources: GCM Google Maps

Catumbela Airport (IATA: CBT, ICAO: FNCT) is an airport in Catumbela, a coastal city in the Benguela Province of Angola.

== History ==
After having been expanded and restored, the airport opened in 2012 and due to its capacity and size, would indicate annual passenger movement of around 2.2 million. Cutumbela Airport will form an alternative to the airport in Luanda. The national certification process for Benguela Province's Catumbela airport is expected to be completed in February 2019, providing that the security standards complies with the 'Empresa Nacional de Navegação Aérea' regarding the infrastructure.

== Facilities ==
The airport boasts two boarding bridges and a 3,700-metre runway, 18 migration service-counters and 16 check-in counters. It also provides executive and first class facilities complete with restaurants and bars.

== Airlines and destinations ==
Airlines	Destinations
Fly Angola	Luanda, Windhoek–Hosea Kutako
TAAG Angola Airlines	Luanda, Lubango, Ondjiva

== See also ==
- List of airports in Angola
- Transport in Angola
