= Joaquim Kapango Airport =

Airport in Angola

Joaquim Kapango Airport Aeroporto Joaquim Kapango
- IATA: SVP; ICAO: FNKU

Summary
- Airport type: Public
- Operator: Government
- Serves: Cuíto, Angola
- Elevation AMSL: 5,618 ft (1,712 m)
- Coordinates: 12°24′15″S 16°56′55″E

Map
- Location of Joaquim Kapango Airport in Angola

Runways
Direction	Length		Surface
Direction	m	ft	Surface
08/26	2,680	8,793	Asphalt
- Source: DAFIF GCM Landings.com Google Maps

Joaquim Kapango Airport (Portuguese: Aeroporto Joaquim Kapango) (IATA: SVP, ICAO: FNKU), or Cuíto Airport, is an airport serving Cuíto (known as Silva Porto before 1975), a city in the Bié Province in Angola.

The Joaquim Kapango non-directional beacon (Ident: KU) is located on the field.

== Airlines and destinations ==
Airlines	Destinations
TAAG Angola Airlines	Luanda

== See also ==
- List of airports in Angola
- Transport in Angola
