= Lobito Airport =

Airport in Lobito, Benguela, Angola

Lobito Airport Aeroporto do Lobito
- IATA: LLT; ICAO: FNLB

Summary
- Airport type: Military
- Location: Lobito, Angola
- Elevation AMSL: 10 ft (3.0 m)
- Coordinates: 12°22′20″S 13°32′15″E

Map
- Location of Lobito Airport in Angola

Runways
Direction	Length		Surface
Direction	m	ft	Surface
16/34	1,500	4,921	Asphalt
- Source: DAFIF GCM Landings.com Google Maps

Lobito Airport (Portuguese: Aeroporto do Lobito) (IATA: LLT, ICAO: FNLB) is an airport serving in Lobito, a town and municipality in the Benguela Province of Angola.

== Accidents and incidents ==
- On 21 May 1972, a Fokker F27 Friendship, with aircraft registration CR-LLD, crashed into the sea on approach to Lobito Airport. Seventeen passengers and three crew died, whilst two passengers and the co-pilot survived.
- On 15 December 1994, Basler BT-67 N96BF of SL Aviation Services was damaged beyond repair in a take-off accident when flight was attempted with insufficient airspeed. Both crew were killed.

== See also ==
- List of airports in Angola
- Transport in Angola
