= Lubango Airport =

Airport serving Lubango, Angola

Lubango Mukanka Airport Aeroporto de Lubango
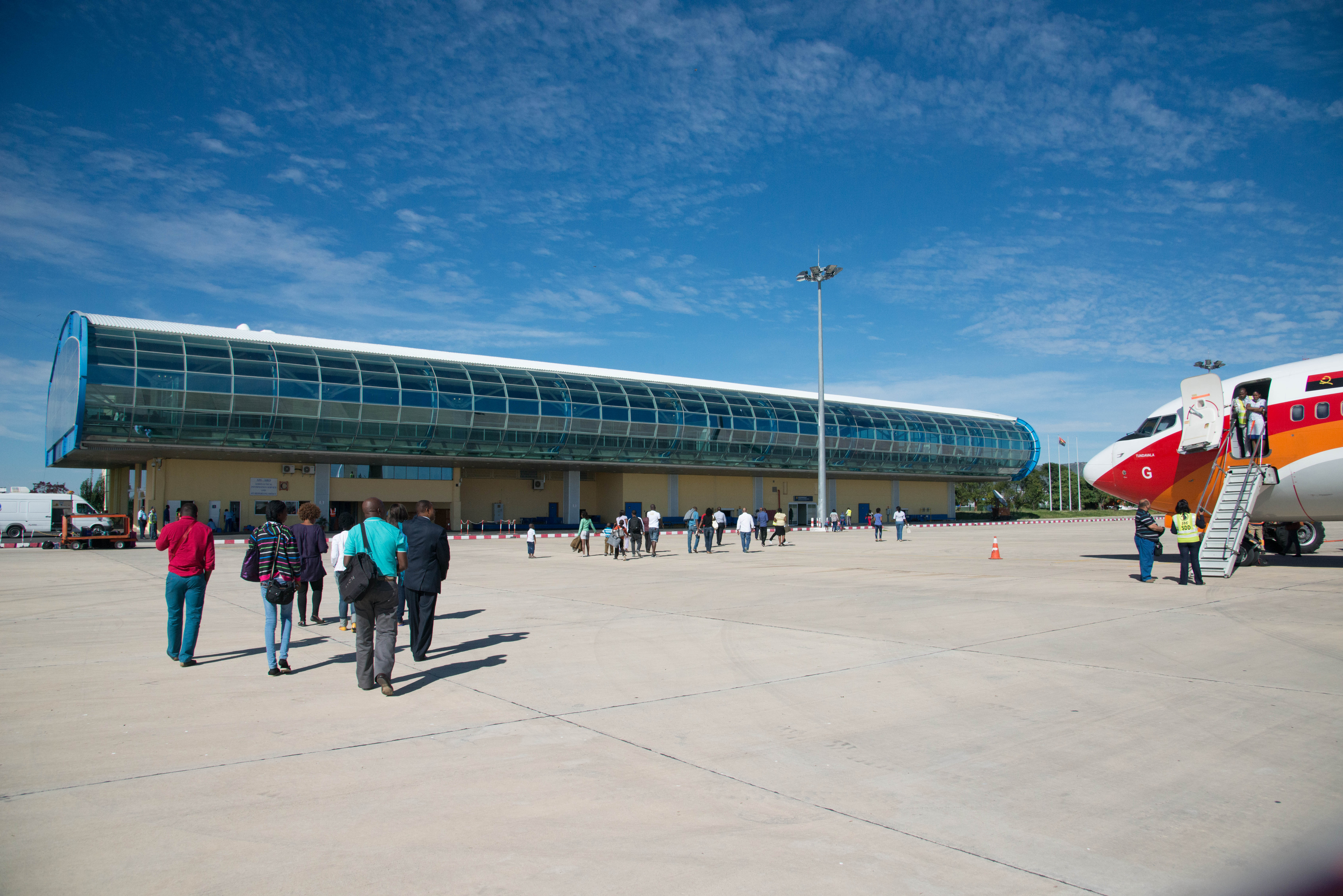
- IATA: SDD; ICAO: FNUB

Summary
- Airport type: Public
- Serves: Lubango
- Elevation AMSL: 5,778 ft (1,761 m)
- Coordinates: 14°55′30″S 13°34′30″E

Map
- Location of Airport in Angola

Runways
Direction	Length		Surface
Direction	m	ft	Surface
10/28	3,150	10,335	Asphalt
- Source: DAFIF GCM Landings.com Google Maps

Lubango Mukanka Airport (Portuguese: Aeroporto de Lubango) (IATA: SDD, ICAO: FNUB) is an airport serving Lubango, the capital city of the Huíla Province in Angola. The Lubango non-directional beacon (Ident: SB) is located 2.4 kilometres (1.5 mi) east-northeast of the Rwy 28 threshold.

== Airlines and destinations ==
Airlines	Destinations
TAAG Angola Airlines	Catumbela, Huambo, Luanda, Ondjiva, Windhoek–Hosea Kutako

== Military use ==
The airport houses four Sukhoi Su-30 fighter aircraft.

== Incidents and accidents ==
- On 8 November 1983 a TAAG Angola Airlines Boeing 737 crashed shortly after takeoff. All 130 passengers and crew on board were killed.

== See also ==
- List of airports in Angola
- Transport in Angola
