= Welwitschia Mirabilis Airport =

Airport in Angola

Welwitschia Mirabilis International Airport Moçâmedes Airport Yuri Gargarin Airport
- IATA: MSZ; ICAO: FNMO

Summary
- Airport type: Public / military
- Serves: Moçâmedes, Angola
- Elevation AMSL: 230 ft (70 m)
- Coordinates: 15°15′40″S 12°8′50″E

Map
- Location of airport in Angola

Runways
Direction	Length		Surface
Direction	m	ft	Surface
08/26	2,500	8,202	Asphalt
- Source: WAD GCM Landings.com

Welwitschia Mirabilis International Airport (Portuguese: Aeroporto Internacional Welwitschia Mirabilis) (IATA: MSZ, ICAO: FNMO) is an airport serving the Atlantic port city of Moçâmedes, the capital of Namibe Province in Angola. The runway is 6.8 kilometres (4.2 mi) south of the city.

Due to political shifts, the airport has had a different name at various times over the years. It is currently named after Welwitschia mirabilis, a plant species endemic to Angola and Namibia.

Aeroporto de Moçâmedes opened in 1960 to replace the old, shorter runway of the local Aero Clube, which had become surrounded by the city. Around 1972, modernisation work was carried out on the runway to accommodate larger jet aircraft. Following independence, the infrastructure was transferred to the new Angolan Republic.

Following independence in November 1975 and the subsequent consolidation of the Marxist-Leninist MPLA government, the airport was named after the Soviet cosmonaut Yuri Gagarin. This name remained officially listed in the IATA and ICAO systems until 2014. The names Yuri Gagarin and Namibe Airport were used interchangeably between 1985 and 2014 to refer to the same physical location.

According to Angolan aviation archives, the final civil expansion works were completed in 1977, with the airstrip being rated for Tu-95KM operations. The airport operated as a base for Soviet Maritime Patrols into the South Atlantic.

Following a $90 million renovation lasting approximately one year, designed by the Brazilian firm Odebrecht and carried out by the Portuguese firm Somague, the airport was reopened on Thursday 13 February 2014 and renamed Welwitschia Mirabilis International Airport. Although the name has been in use since 2014, the formal upgrade to a certified international airport was recently initiated by the Ministry of Transport to enable direct flights to neighbouring countries Namibia and South Africa.

== See also ==
- List of airports in Angola
- Transport in Angola
