= TAAG Angola Airlines =

State-owned flag carrier of Angola

TAAG Angola Airlines TAAG Linhas Aéreas de Angola

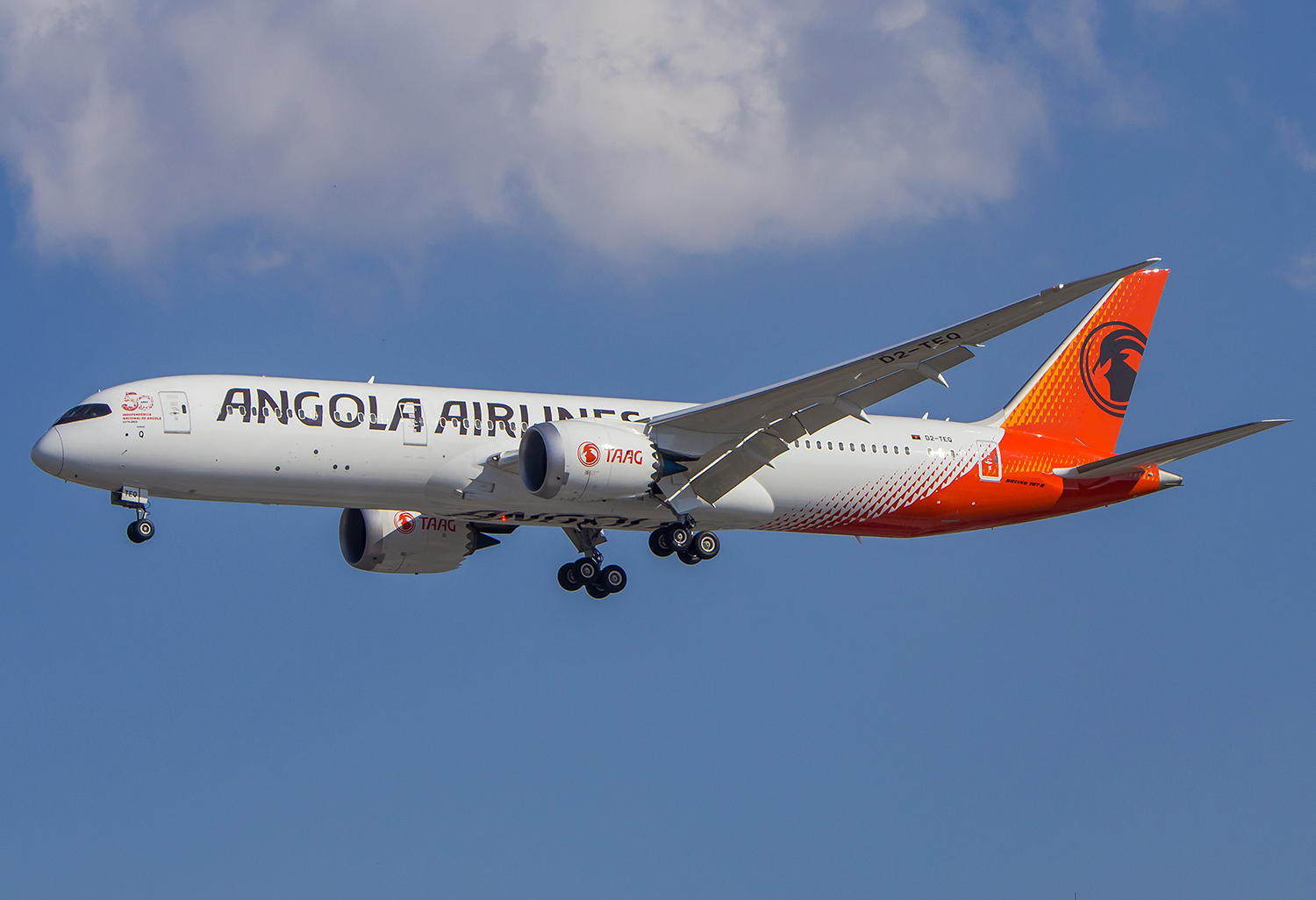
- TAAG Angola Airlines Boeing 787-9
IATA	ICAO	Call sign
DT	DTA	DTA
- Founded: September 1938; 88 years ago (as DTA, Divisão dos Transportes Aéreos)
- Commenced operations: 17 July 1940; 86 years ago
- Hubs: Dr. Antonio Agostinho Neto International Airport
- Frequent-flyer program: Umbi Umbi Club
- Subsidiaries: Angola Air Charter; (100%)
- Fleet size: 28
- Destinations: 31
- Parent company: Government of Angola (100%)
- Headquarters: Luanda, Angola
- Key people: Clóvis Rosa (Chairman); Eduardo Fairen (CEO); Vipula Gunatilleka (CFO)
- Profit: ▲US$−5 million (FY 2016)
- Employees: 3,268
- Website: taag.com

TAAG Angola Airlines E.P. (Portuguese: TAAG Linhas Aéreas de Angola E.P.) is a state-owned airline and flag carrier of Angola. Based in Luanda, the airline operates domestic services within Angola, medium-haul services in Africa and long-haul services to Brazil, Cuba, and Portugal. The airline was originally set up by the government as DTA – Divisão dos Transportes Aéreos in 1938, rechristened TAAG Angola Airlines in 1973, and gained flag carrier status in 1975. It is now a member of both the International Air Transport Association and the African Airlines Association. The airline uses Dr. Antonio Agostinho Neto International Airport as its hub.

== History ==
=== DTA – Divisão dos Transportes Aéreos (1938–1973) ===
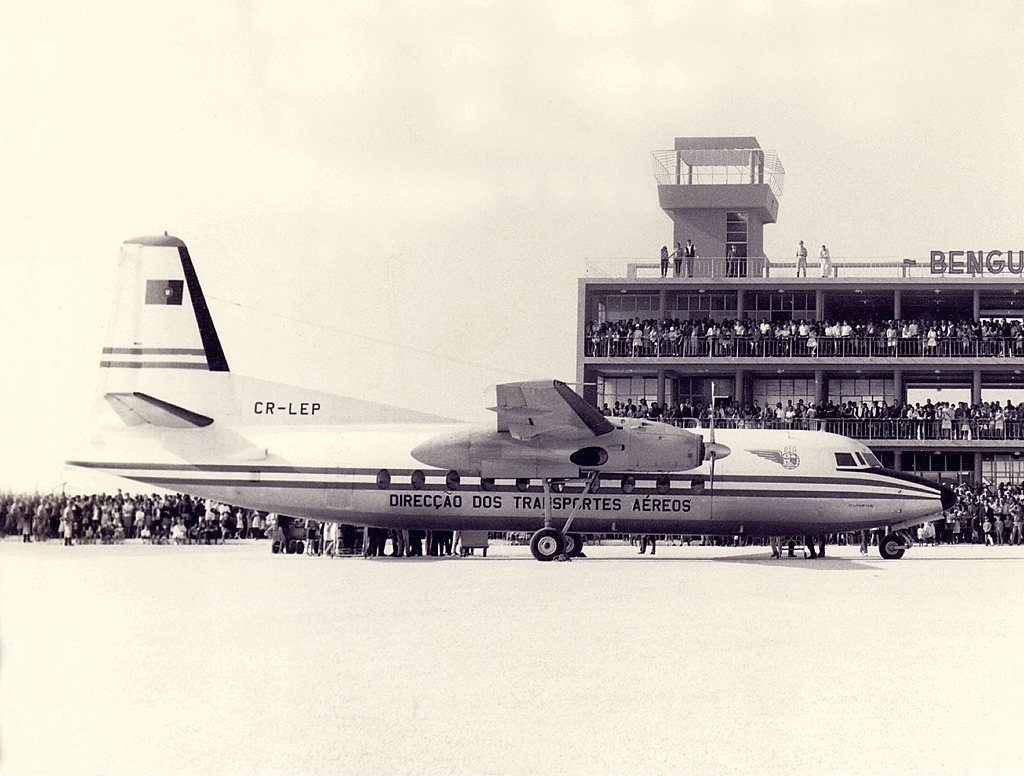
DTA Fokker F-27-200 at Benguela Airport in 1965

The origins of the carrier can be traced back to 1937, when the president of Portugal Óscar Carmona asked Joaquim de Almeida Baltazar to create an airline in Angola. In September 1938, DTA – Divisão dos Transportes Aéreos was formed as a division of the Administration of Railways, Harbours, and Air Transport of Portuguese West Africa. It was owned and run by the government, which authorised the acquisition of three De Havilland Dragon Rapides and two Junkers Ju 52s, although the latter two aircraft were not delivered due to the outbreak of the Second World War. Operations began on 17 July 1940, using the dragon biplanes. The first routes to be operated were founded by the Aero Club of Angola and included two main lines: one running between Luanda and Pointe Noire, having connections with Aeromaritime services to Europe, and the other being Luanda–Benguela–Lobito that was later extended to Moçâmedes. Flights were intermittently discontinued during World War II due to the scarcity of spare parts, but by the end of the war, the airline resumed operations. Two Stinson Reliants bought from the Belgian Congo in 1944 permitted the carrier to resume coastal services. The DC-3 and the Beechcraft Model 18 joined the fleet in 1946. In March that year, a new route to Leopoldville was launched. The airline joined the International Air Transport Association in 1951. Also in that year, the company extended the Leopoldville route further east, serving Lourenço Marques, but this destination was later abandoned due to poor financial performance. DTA also operated a route linking Luanda with Lourenço Marques via Livingstone between 1951 and 1952; poor sales prompted the airline to terminate the service. A 700-mile (1,100 km) long route to São Tomé was launched in 1956.

By April 1960, the fleet was composed of four Beech 18s, seven DC-3s and three DH.89s. A year later, DTA became the third African airline in ordering the Fokker F-27, with two aircraft acquired. At this time, the company had a route network that was 3,300 miles (5,300 km) long. The F-27s were incorporated into the fleet in 1962. Served with these brand new aircraft, Windhoek was added to the route network that year.

=== TAAG Angola Airlines (1973–present) ===
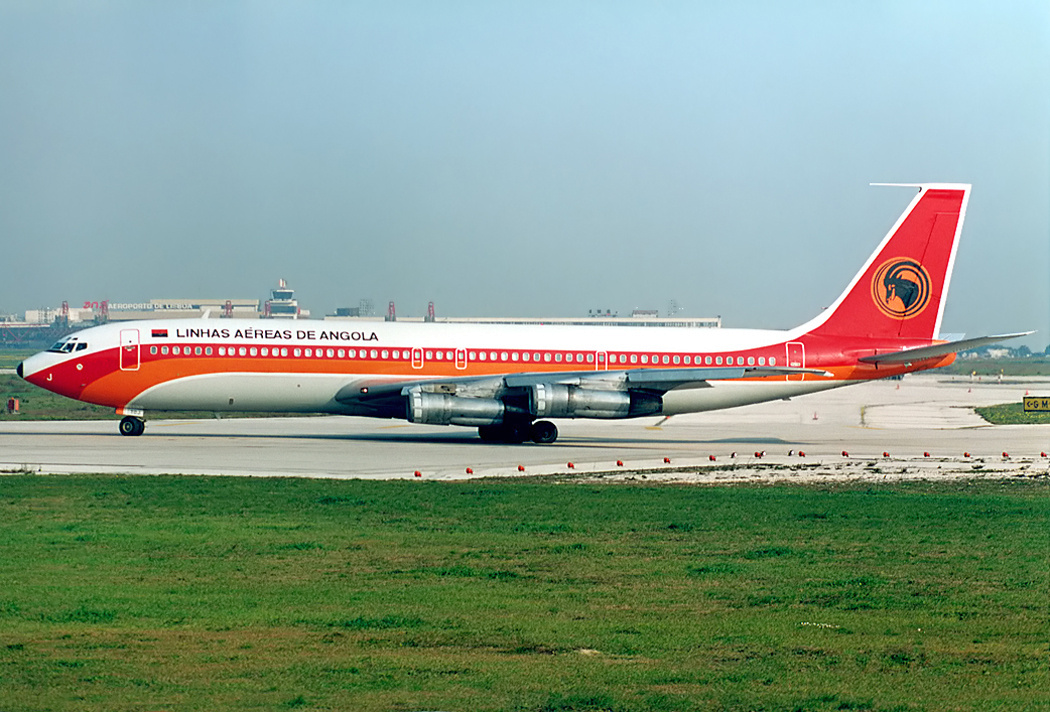
TAAG Angola Airlines Boeing 707-320C at Lisbon Portela Airport in 1991

Following its renaming to TAAG – Transportes Aéreos de Angola on 1 October 1973, the airline was reorganised and reconstituted. The company's shareholders at the time were the Angolan government (51%), TAP Air Portugal (29%) and ex-DTA employees (20%). Four Boeing 737-200s were ordered in 1974. The same year, a new livery including the Palança Negra was unveiled. Three F-27s and six DC-3s composed the fleet by March 1975. Following the rise to power of the communists, that year the country gained independence from Portugal; the airline became Angola's flag carrier in October. In November, the company took delivery of the first Boeing 737-200. In January 1976, the delivery of two Boeing 737-200Cs was blocked by the US State Department; the embargo was lifted two months later following the end of the civil war in the country. Valued at around US$18 million, these two aircraft were finally delivered by late April that year. In February the same year, an ex-Allegheny Airlines Fairchild FH-227 on delivery flight to Suidwes Lugdiens was forced to land at Luanda while flying over Angolan territory. The country seized control of the aircraft, which was later reported to be in service with TAAG, along with an ex-Argentine Air Force Caravelle and two ex-THY Turkish Airlines F-27s. Three Yak-40s entered the fleet in 1977, along with other Soviet-built aircraft; late this year, an ex-British Caledonian Airways Boeing 707-320C was sold to TAAG. In 1978, TAAG acquired two used F27s from Fokker, and another Boeing 737 was ordered a year later. A Lockheed L-100-20, registration D2-FAF, was involved in an accident while landing at São Tomé.

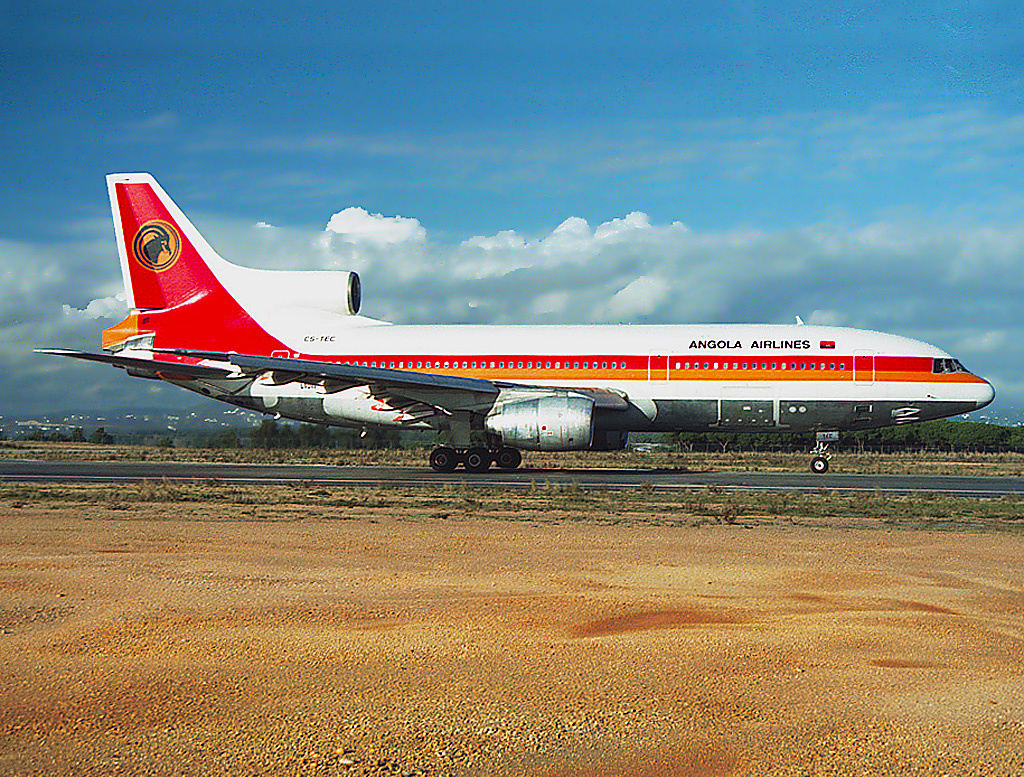
Portuguese registered Lockheed L-1011-500 wearing TAAG Angola Airlines livery at Faro Airport in 1995

By March 1980, the carrier had a fleet of three Boeing 707-320Cs, three Boeing 737-200Cs, six Fokker F27s —four -600s and two -200s—, three L-100s —two -20s and one -30— and four Yakovlev Yak-40s to serve a number of domestic destinations, plus Brazzaville, São Tome, Lagos, Maputo, Lisbon, Moscow, Paris and Rome. The company was reorganised again during the year. On 8 June, a Yak-40 (registration D2-TYC) crashed near Matala killing all 19 occupants on board. On 16 May 1981, the crew of four on board a Lockheed L-100-20 Hercules, registration D2-EAS, lost their lives in an accident at Mongua. During the early 1980s, the fleet also included a small number of Antonov An-26s that started being phased out. One of these examples (D2-TAB) was involved in an accident at Monte Bibala on 29 November 1982; 15 people lost their lives. Another fatal accident took place almost a year later, on 8 November 1983, when the crash of a Boeing 737-200 (D2-TBN) at Lubango resulted in 130 fatalities. Serious financial difficulties were uncovered during 1984. In the mid-1980s, an L-100 Hercules was withdrawn from service and two Ilyushin Il-62Ms were acquired for operations to Cuba. The carrier phased in the first of these two aircraft in 1988. On 21 July 1988, a Boeing 707 freighter owned by the airline crashed 20 kilometres (12 mi) away from Murtala Muhammed International Airport; six crewmembers lost their lives in the accident.

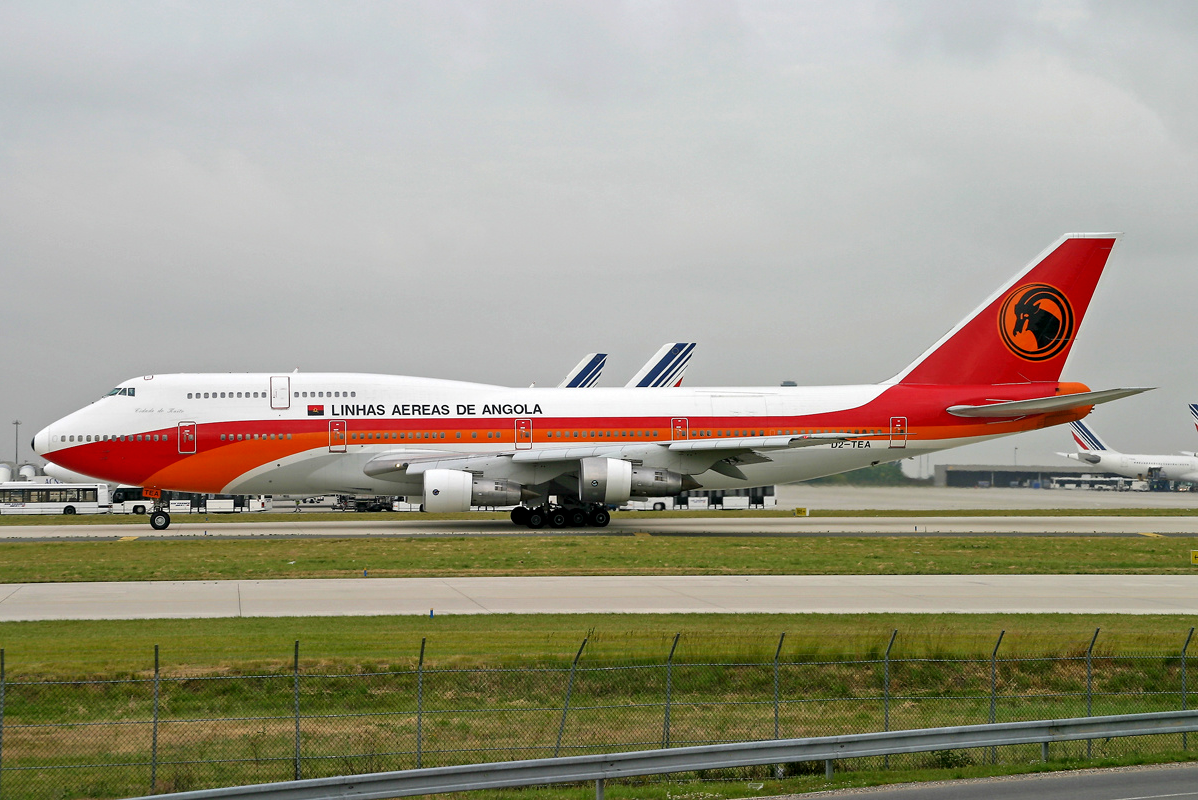
TAAG Angola Airlines Boeing 747-300M at Charles de Gaulle Airport in 2005

At March 1990, TAAG Angola Airlines had TAAG-Air Charter and TAAG Aviacao Ligeira as associated companies; the number of employees was 5,770. At this time, the fleet consisted of six Boeing 707-320s (one -320B and five -320Cs), four Boeing 737-200s, one Boeing 737-200C, one Lockheed L100-200, six Fokker F.27s (one -100, one -400M, one -500 and three -600s) and two Yakovlev Yak-40s. The carrier's network comprised 18 domestic points in Angola served from Luanda plus international flights to Berlin-Schonefeld, Brazzaville, Havana, Kinshasa, Lisbon, Lusaka, Maputo, Moscow, Paris, Rio de Janeiro, Rome, Sal and Sao Tome. On 31 January 1995, a Boeing 727-200, registration D2-TJB, crashed on landing at Huambo; the landing gear was torn off following the aircraft aquaplaning off the runway as a result of a long landing. There were no serious injuries among the occupants of the aircraft. TAAG bought a Boeing 747-300 Combi from Singapore Airlines in 1997.

In July 2005, TAAG Angola Airlines ordered three Boeing 777-200ERs and four Boeing 737-700s, it also took options on one and two more of these aircraft, respectively. The ordered aircraft were initially scheduled for delivery in July 2006. The new aircraft were aimed at replacing the ageing Boeing 747-300s and Boeing 737-200s. The order was partially fulfilled in November 2006, when two Boeing 777-200ERs and three 737-700s were delivered. One of these Boeing 777-200ERs established a record-breaking distance for the delivery of the type, when it flew 12,860 kilometres (6,940 nmi; 7,990 mi) between Seattle and Luanda in 16 hours and 47 minutes. In March 2011, the Boeing 747-300 fleet was retired from service. In June the same year, the airline received its first newly acquired Boeing 777-300ER, out of two ordered in October 2009; TAAG became the first African carrier in purchasing and operating this type of aircraft. Three additional 293-seater Boeing 777-300ERs were ordered in April 2012, in a deal worth US$895 million.

=== European Union ban and subsequent restructuring (2007) ===
TAAG Angola Airlines EU ban evolution since October 2006
Date of release of ban list	Ban status	Refs
12 October 2006	Not banned	
5 March 2007	Not banned	
4 July 2007	Banned	
11 September 2007	Banned	
28 November 2007	Banned	
11 April 2008	Banned	
24 July 2008	Banned	
14 November 2008	Banned	
14 July 2009	Partly banned	
26 November 2009	Partly banned	
30 March 2010	Partly banned	
23 November 2010	Partly banned	
20 April 2011	Partly banned	
23 November 2011	Partly banned	
3 April 2012	Partly banned	
4 December 2012	Partly banned	
10 July 2013	Partly banned	
3 December 2013	Partly banned	
10 April 2014	Partly banned	
11 December 2014	Partly banned	
25 June 2015	Partly banned	
10 December 2015	Partly banned	
16 June 2016	Partly banned	
8 December 2016	Partly banned	
16 May 2017	Partly banned	
30 November 2017	Partly banned	
14 June 2018	Partly banned	
17 April 2019	Not banned	

The European Union (EU), in its fourth update of the list of blacklisted airlines released in July 2007, banned TAAG aircraft from entering European airspace due to safety concerns. At the same time, the United Kingdom barred TAAG from flying into its territory, just before the airline was about to start services to London-Gatwick; in retaliation, Angola banned British Airways from landing within the country's borders. The carrier announced it was losing US$5 million a month because of the ban. To continue operating flights to Europe, TAAG wet-leased a Boeing 747-400 from South African Airways (SAA). Following the EU ban, in November 2008, the entire TAAG board was replaced; a new board was appointed with the objective of turning the carrier around, particularly of getting it removed from the EU blacklist. At the time, according to Transport Minister Augusto da Silva Tomás, the company lost about US$70 million (€55.6 million) over 14 months. The turnaround plan included staff reductions in the 5,000-strong workforce. In 2008, TAAG launched a new route to Beijing.

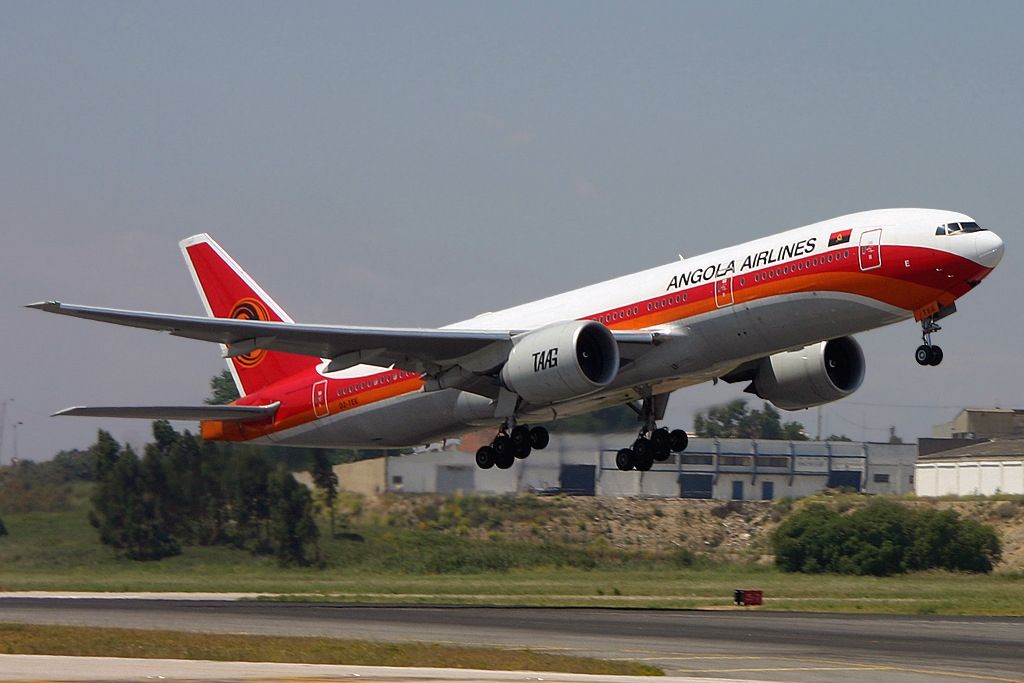
D2-TEE was one of the three Boeing 777s that TAAG Angola Airlines was allowed to use to relaunch operations to Europe following the partial lift of the EU ban on the airline in July 2009. The aircraft is seen here at Lisbon Portela Airport in May 2007.

It was announced in May 2009 that TAAG had passed IATA inspections. In July, TAAG received permission to operate flights solely to Portugal and only using its three Boeing 777s. This partial liftting of the ban made TAAG the only Angolan airline permitted to fly to the EU. After nearly two years of being banned from EU airspace, TAAG deployed its own aircraft on the European corridor immediately. TAAG then ended the South African Airways Boeing 747-400 wet lease. In November 2009, the European Commission gave additional permission for TAAG's four Boeing 737-700s to fly in EU airspace. That month, TAAG restarted services to Havana; the flight in particular serves numerous Cuban doctors and teachers residing in Angola. In late March 2010, restrictions on TAAG operations were again relaxed following the announcement that the airline could fly its Boeing 777-200ERs and 737-700s to all European airports.

In December 2010, two engine incidents involving TAAG's Boeing 777-200ERs forced the carrier to ground the three aircraft of the type.

In April 2012, the ban was partially lifted, but some aircraft were still prevented from flying in European airspace. An updated version of the list of airlines banned in the EU released in early December 2012 still included part of TAAG's fleet; however, five Boeing 777s and four Boeing 737-700s were allowed to operate in the EU. There were few changes to the aircraft allowed to fly into the EU in the 11 following lists released from July 2013 to June 2018 (see table).

On 17 April 2019, the ban was completely lifted, allowing TAAG to fly all its aircraft to any EU country.

=== Emirates management agreement (2014–2017) ===
In late September 2014, a ten-year management concession agreement between Emirates and the Government of Angola was signed; the deal also covered flight codesharing and the coordination of frequent flier programmes. In the first full year of operation under the agreement, annual losses dropped from $175m to $5m; the Ernst & Young-audited figures for January to December 2016 were approved at the airline's Board meeting on 9 March 2017.

The contract was unilaterally terminated by Emirates in 2017 after the Emirati carrier found difficulties in expatriating around US$340 million in revenues from Angola.

=== Post-COVID expansion and profitability ===
In September 2020, TAAG resumed domestic, and later, international services, after the cancelled operations due to the COVID-19 pandemic. Initial flights were flown using a pair of newly delivered De Havilland Canada Dash 8 turboprops, the first from an order of six to eventually join the fleet, with long-haul flights operated by the airline's 777s. In 2023, an order for 15 Airbus A220s was placed to replace the carrier's 737-700s and allow for regional expansion. The long-haul fleet was also overhauled with the announcement later that year of orders for four Boeing 787 aircraft, consisting of a pair of -9s in addition to a pair of larger -10s, which would make TAAG the first African airline to operate the 787-10.

In April 2023, the airline signed a codeshare agreement with Brazilian low-cost carrier Gol Linhas Aéreas, adding TAAG's airline code to 13 Gol routes and Gol's code to the São Paulo-to-Luanda route, enabling further connections to TAAG's African destinations. In May 2023, the airline released its financial performance for the previous year, stating a profit of 460,000,000 kwanzas, or roughly US$800,000.

February 2024 marked the start of a new era for the airline, as it began operations from the new Dr. Antonio Agostinho Neto International Airport, initially operating cargo flights to Lagos, Brazzaville and Johannesburg. The new airport is reported to have cost over $3 billion and will become the airline's hub for both passenger and cargo traffic; the first passenger flights, to Cabinda, launched on 10 November 2024 using the Dash 8-Q400s, with further domestic rotations transferring in December. The first flights from the new airport were operated using a Boeing 737-800BCF (Boeing Converted Freighter) cargo aircraft, delivered to the airline in December 2023, followed soon after by the addition of a larger Boeing 747-400F, on a long-term lease from Network Airline Management, with a capacity of 120,000 kg. The cargo division was very successful for TAAG and greatly contributed to the airline's profitability, with CEO Eduardo Fairen Soria saying "We have very strong traffic in the cargo space... we want to develop this service with larger aircraft". This strength was reflected in the airline's 2022 financial report citing a revenue of US$67 million, with the potential to grow even further with the move to the new airport, which has the capacity to accommodate 50,000 tons of cargo each year.

TAAG took delivery of its first 137-seater A220 in September 2024. This was the first planned step in doubling the fleet size to over 40 aircraft. The airline is looking to boost its foreign exchange income due to its heavy reliance on foreign currency. In November 2025, the airline phased in its first Boeing 787-10; the induction of a second aircraft of the type occurred a month later.

== Corporate affairs ==
=== Ownership, management and structure ===
At May 2026, TAAG Angola Airlines was 100% owned by the government of Angola. TAAG is itself the sole owner of Angola Air Charter, also based in Luanda, that operates cargo charters in Africa.

As of May 2026, the chairmanship is held by Clóvis Rosa. As of October 2023, Eduardo Fairen is the chief executive officer. As of August 2017, Vipula Gunatilleka is chief financial officer.

=== Business trends ===
The airline does not appear to publish annual reports. In the absence of these, the main sources for trends are press and industry reports of fleet size; even these are only indicative since it is not always clear whether the aircraft are actually in service. Available figures (for years ending on 31 December) are the following:

	2008	2009	2010	2011	2012	2013	2014	2015	2016	2017	2018	2019	2020	2021	2022
Turnover (US$ m)		585		530	650		700								
Profit (US$ m)	−70	−72					−99	−140	−5						
Number of employees (at year end)		4,124			3,281	3,589		3,559	3,268	3,112	3,064	2,914	2,743	2,742	2,742
Number of passengers (m)			1.1	0.8	1.1	1.3		1.3	1.2	1.4	1.5	1.5	0.4	0.3	0.9
Passenger load factor (%)								57.0	49.0	50	46	50	38	53	67
Number of aircraft (at year end)	14	11	11	12	12	11	14	13	13	13	13	16	9	18	16
Notes/sources															

=== Head office ===
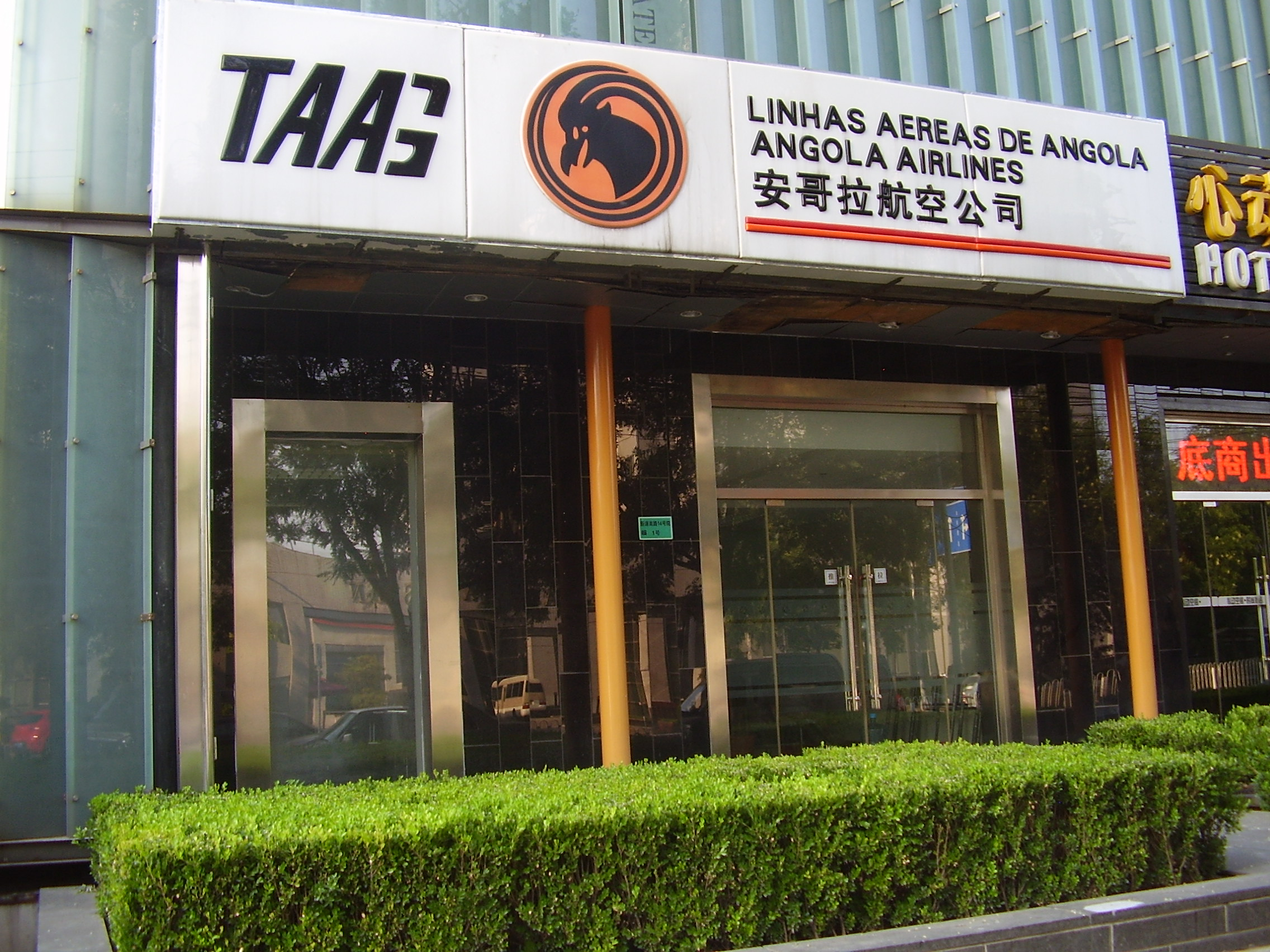
The TAAG office in Beijing

TAAG has its corporate headquarters in Luanda, Angola. The airline also has offices in Africa, Asia, Europe, and North and South America, and opened an office in Chaoyang District, Beijing in 2010.

== Destinations ==
As of October 2014, TAAG Angola Airlines serves 31 destinations, including 13 domestic, 11 in Africa, three in Latin America, two in Schengen Europe, and three in the Middle East and the Asia-Pacific region.

=== Codeshare agreements ===
TAAG Angola Airlines has codeshare agreements with the following airlines:

- Air France
- British Airways
- Brussels Airlines
- Cabo Verde Airlines
- Gol Linhas Aéreas Inteligentes
- Iberia
- Kenya Airways
- KLM
- LAM Mozambique Airlines
- Lufthansa
- Royal Air Maroc
- South African Airways

== Fleet ==
=== Current fleet ===
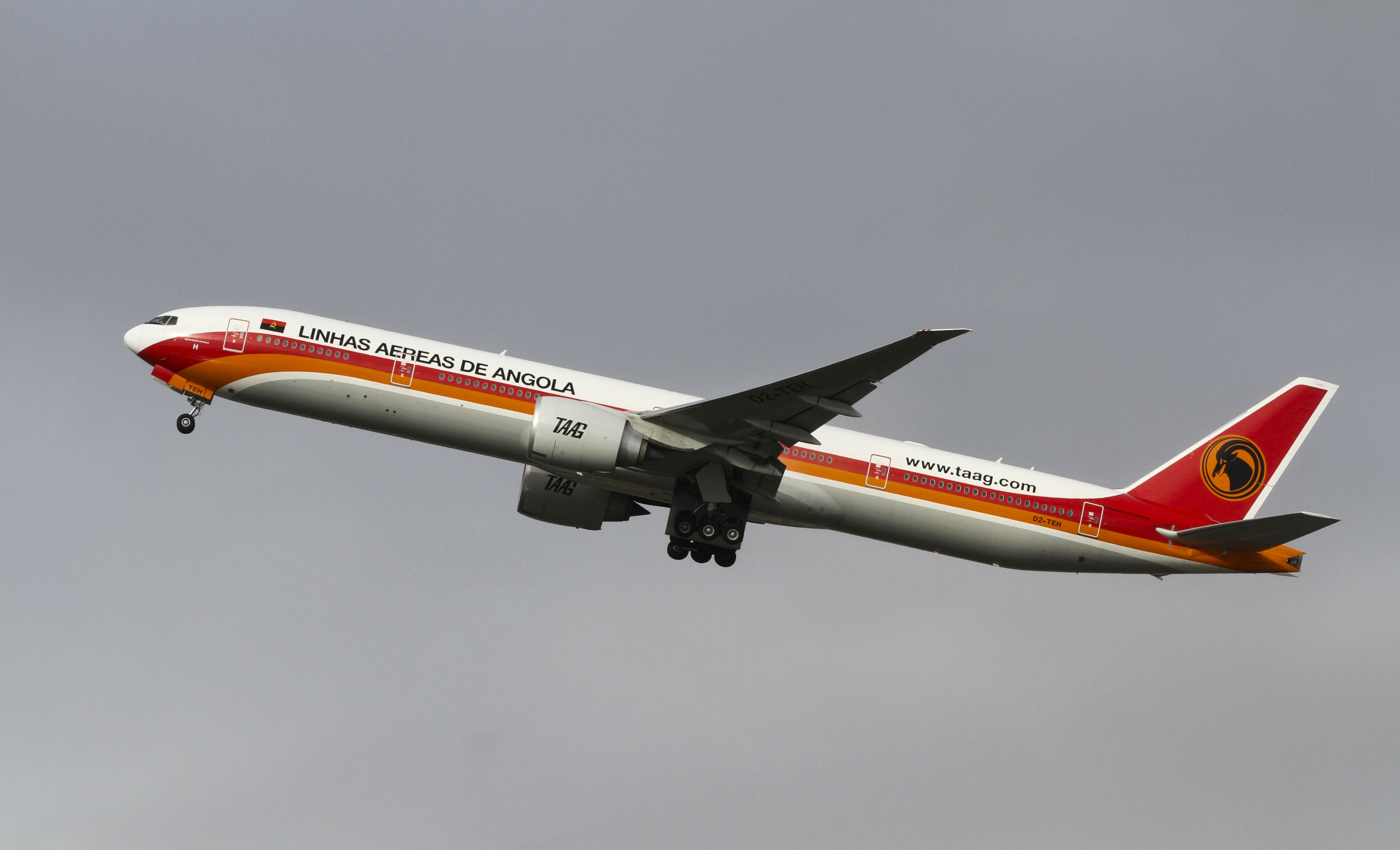
A TAAG Boeing 777-300ER (2012)

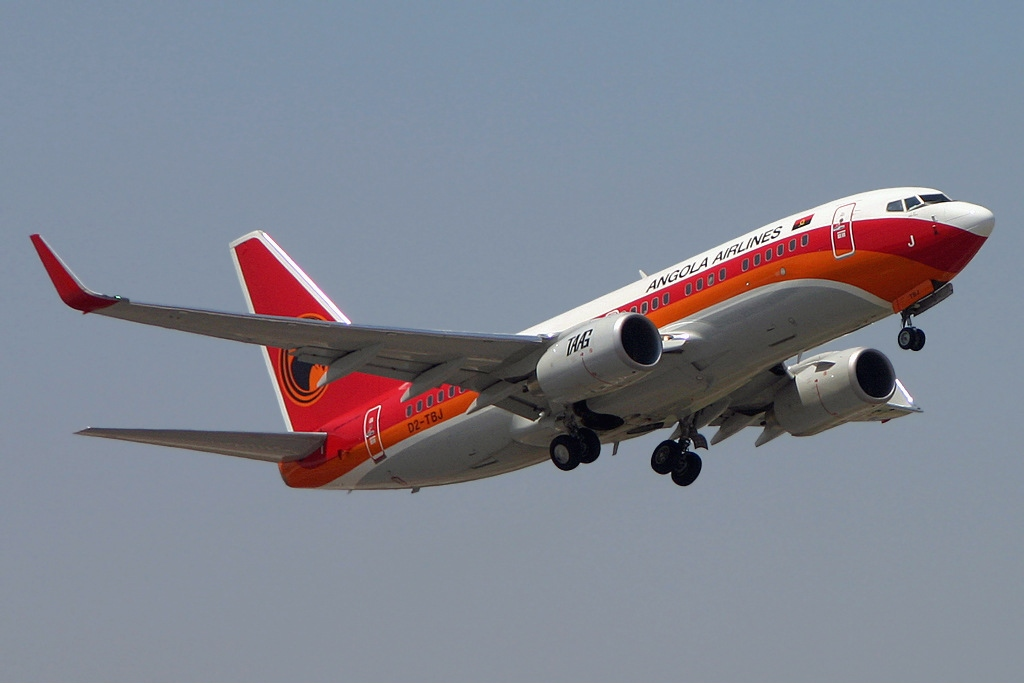
A TAAG Boeing 737-700 (2007)

As of December 2025, TAAG Angola Airlines operates the following aircraft:

TAAG Angola Airlines fleet
Aircraft	In service	Orders	Passengers					Notes
Aircraft	In service	Orders	F	J	W	Y	Total	Notes
Airbus A220-300	4	11	—	12	—	125	137	Replacing Boeing 737-700.
Boeing 737-700	7	—	—	12	—	108	120	To be retired and replaced by Airbus A220-300.
Boeing 777-200ER	3	—	14	51	—	170	235	
Boeing 777-300ER	5	—	12	56	—	225	293	
Boeing 787-9	2	—	—	16	21	276	313	
Boeing 787-10	2	—	—	24	—	343	367	
De Havilland Dash 8-400	6	—	—	10	—	64	74	
TAAG Angola Airlines Cargo fleet
Boeing 737-700QC	1	—	Cargo					
Boeing 737-800BCF	1	—	Cargo					
Total	31	12						

=== Historical fleet ===
The company previously operated the following aircraft:

- Airbus A340-300
- Antonov An-26
- Beechcraft Model 18 (1946–)
- Boeing 707-320B
- Boeing 707-320C
- Boeing 727-100C
- Boeing 737-200 Advanced
- Boeing 737-200C (1977–)
- Boeing 747-300
- Boeing 747-300 Combi
- Boeing 747-400
- de Havilland DH.89 Dragon Rapide (1940–)
- Douglas C-47A (1946–)
- Douglas DC-8-30
- Douglas DC-8-50
- Fokker 50
- Fokker F27-100
- Fokker F27-200 (1962–)
- Fokker F27-400
- Fokker F27-500
- Fokker F27-600
- Ilyushin Il-62M
- Lockheed L-100-20 Hercules
- Lockheed L-100-30
- Lockheed L-1011 TriStar 500
- Sud Aviation Caravelle
- Yakovlev Yak-40 (1977–)

== In-flight service ==
TAAG Angola Airlines became OnAir's first Sub-Saharan customer. The carrier plans to offer inflight connectivity aboard the Boeing 777-300ER fleet starting May 2014.

First Class

First Class, branded as Diamond First Class, is available only on TAAG's Boeing 777 aircraft. First class features fully flat-bed seats with AVOD in-flight entertainment. Additionally, amenity kits, pillows, and blankets are given to first class passengers. Passengers also have designated check-in desks and have access to TAAG's Welwitchia Lounge in Luanda Airport.

Business Class

Business Class, known as Executiva Class, is found on all TAAG aircraft. On the Boeing 777 fleet, the seats are angled lie-flat with AVOD in-flight entertainment in each seat. Amenity kits, pillows, and blankets are given to all Business Class passengers. Additionally, they are entitled to priority check-in and also have access to TAAG's Welwitchia Lounge in Luanda Airport.

Economy Class

Branded as HighFly Economic Class, TAAG's long-haul economy class cabin is equipped with AVOD in-flight entertainment. The seats feature footrests and winged headrests for extra comfort. Pillows and blankets are given to all economy class passengers, and hot meals are served on all international flights.

In-Flight Entertainment

All TAAG long-haul aircraft are equipped with AVOD entertainment throughout all cabins. Known as Palanca, there are two variations throughout the Boeing 777 fleet. Rockwell Collins' dTES system is installed on the B777-200ERs, while the newer B777-300ERs possess the Thales TopSeries™ Audio Video On-demand System. The B737-700 fleet features drop-down LCD screens, used to show cabin-wide movies and a moving map display. Additionally, TAAG has an in-flight magazine and an in-flight entertainment guide, both known as austral.

== Accidents and incidents ==
=== Accidents involving fatalities ===
- 21 May 1972: A Fokker F27 Friendship, with aircraft registration CR-LLD, crashed into the sea on approach to Lobito Airport. Seventeen passengers and three crew died, whilst two passengers and the co-pilot survived.
- 29 November 1982: An Antonov 26, registration D2-TAB, that operated a non-scheduled passenger service, flew into mountainous terrain and crashed. All 15 occupants of the aircraft perished in the accident.
- 14 April 1997: A Fokker F-27-600, tail number D2-TFP, operating a Brazzaville–Luanda cargo service, rolled right following rotation from Maya-Maya Airport, fell onto the runway it took off from and skidded until it came to rest past the end of it, breaking in two and bursting into flames. There were three reported fatalities.
- 28 June 2007: A Boeing 737-200 crashed in northern Angola. Portuguese news agency Lusa said the aircraft had taken off from the Angolan capital, Luanda, and was trying to land at M'banza-Kongo in the province of Zaire, which is in northern Angola near the border with the Democratic Republic of Congo. At least five people were killed and 66 injured. Among those killed in the accident was the municipal administrator of M'banza-Kongo and a senior Roman Catholic priest from Italy. The airplane was carrying 78 passengers when it crashed at 1330 local time (12.30 GMT). The agency said control of the aircraft was lost upon landing and it crashed into a building, destroying it. The director of Aeroportos de Angola (the Angolan airport authority) told national radio the pilot had missed the runway for an unknown reason while attempting an emergency landing. According to aviation sources in Luanda, the aircraft apparently punctured two tyres upon landing, causing one wing to dip and touch the runway. The aircraft then veered out of control and crashed into the building. Initial press reports indicated that the aircraft touched down about halfway along the runway while attempting to land at M'banza-Kongo.

=== Incidents involving fatalities ===
- 8 June 1980: A Yakovlev Yak-40K, registration D2-TYC, was shot down by a MiG-19 near Matala, Angola. There were 19 reported fatalities.
- 16 May 1981: A Lockheed L-100-20 Hercules, tail number D2-EAS, that was operating a freighter service, was shot down by a missile on approach to Menongue Airport. All four occupants of the aircraft perished in the incident.
- 8 November 1983: A Boeing 737-2M2, registration D2-TBN, crashed immediately after takeoff from Lubango Airport bound for Quatro de Fevereiro Airport; all 130 occupants of the aircraft —of whom 126 were passengers— died. UNITA guerrillas claimed to have shot down the airliner.

=== Incidents involving no fatalities ===
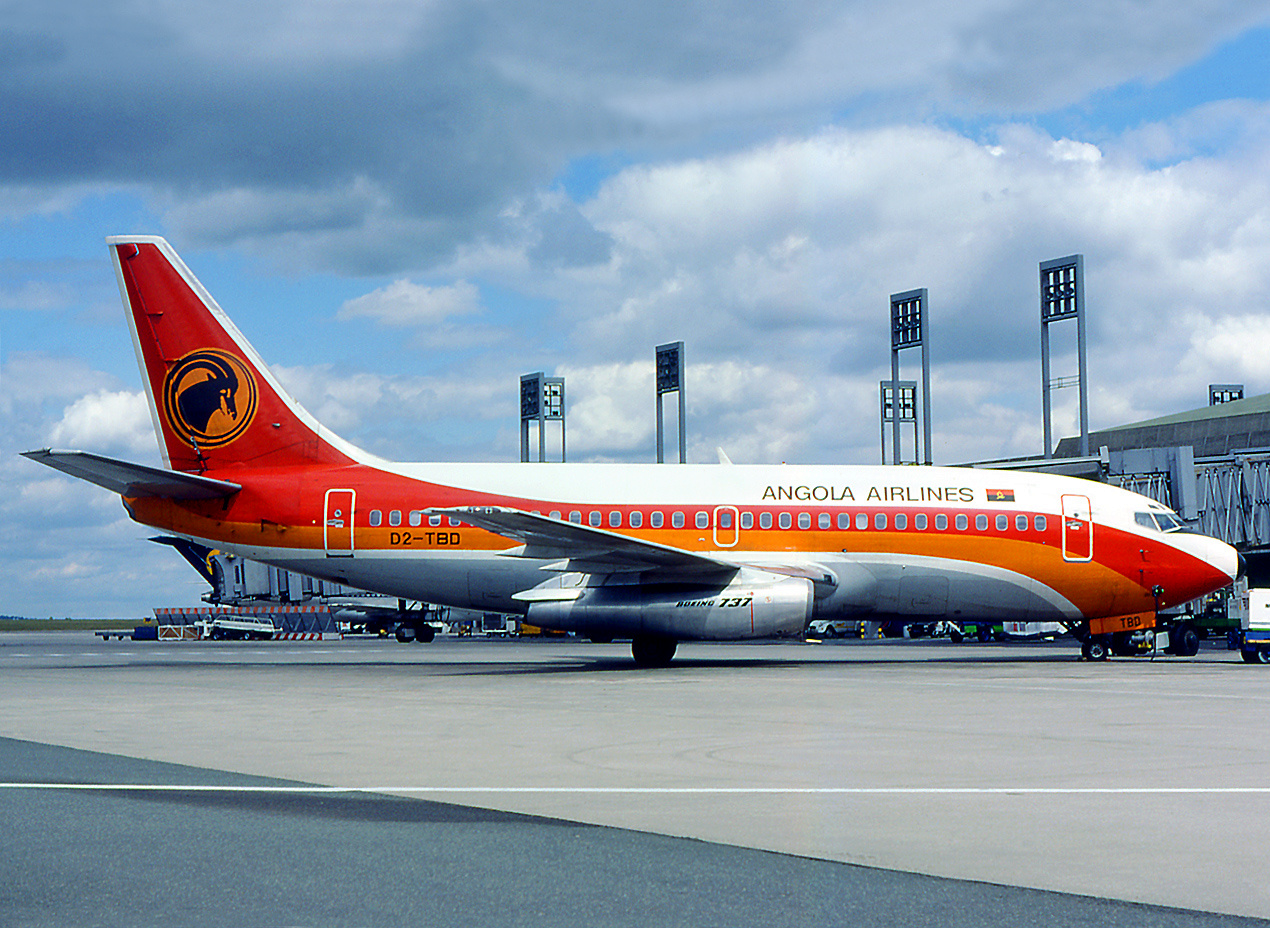
D2-TBD, a TAAG Angola Airlines Boeing 737-200 Advanced, was involved in a mid-air collision with another aeroplane over Namibia on 26 December 2002. The aircraft is seen here at Paris-Charles de Gaulle Airport in 1986.

- 26 December 2002: A Boeing 737-2M2, registration D2-TBD, that had departed from Windhoek Hosea Kutako International Airport bound for Luanda operating as Flight 572, was involved in a mid-air collision over Namibian airspace with a Cessna 404, registration V5-WAA, that took off from Windhoek Eros Airport. The collision occurred some 28 kilometres (17 mi) north of Hosea Kutako Airport. The Boeing sustained minor damage to one of its wings, but continued its flight to Luanda; the pilot of the Cessna —the only occupant of the light aircraft— managed to land it safely despite the damage it sustained in the incident. All occupants from both aircraft survived unharmed.

=== Non-fatal hull-losses ===
- 15 May 1979: A Lockheed L-100-20 Hercules, registration D2-FAF, crashed on landing at São Tomé International Airport.
- 4 November 1980: A Boeing 737-2M2C, tail number D2-TAA, that landed short of the runway at Benguela Airport, slid some 900 m following the collapse of the gear; a fire broke out on the right wing but there were no reported fatalities. The aircraft caught fire during recovery operations on 10 November, and was written off.
- 9 February 1984: A Boeing 737-2M2, registration D2-TBV, that departed from Albano Machado Airport operating a scheduled passenger service, suffered hydraulic problems following an explosion in the rear of the aircraft and returned to the airport of departure for an emergency landing. The plane touched down fast and overran the runway.
- 8 January 1988: A Yakovlev Yak-40K, tail number D2-TYD, ran off the runway upon landing at Quatro de Fevereiro Airport.
- 8 February 1988: A Boeing 707-349C, registration D2-TOI, had its hydraulic and control lines broken after it hit an antenna on approach to Quatro de Fevereiro Airport; the nosegear collapsed when it overran the runway.
- 20 February 1992: A Boeing 707-349C, tail number D2-TOJ, experienced a nosegear failure during taxiing at Quatro de Fevereiro Airport.

== See also ==
- Airlines of Africa
- Transport in Angola

== Bibliography ==
- Guttery, Ben R. (1998). Encyclopedia of African Airlines. Jefferson, NC: McFarland & Company. ISBN 0-7864-0495-7.
