= Menongue Airport =

Airport in Angola

Menongue Airport Aeroporto de Menongue
- IATA: SPP; ICAO: FNME

Summary
- Airport type: Public
- Operator: Government
- Serves: Menongue, Angola
- Elevation AMSL: 4,691 ft (1,430 m)
- Coordinates: 14°39′25″S 17°43′05″E

Map
- Location of Airport in Angola

Runways
Direction	Length		Surface
Direction	m	ft	Surface
13/31	3,500	11,483	Asphalt
- Source: DAFIF GCM Landings.com Google Maps

Menongue Airport (Portuguese: Aeroporto de Menongue) (IATA: SPP, ICAO: FNME) is an airport serving Menongue, a municipality in the province of Cubango in Angola.

From 2008 to 2014 the expansion of their terminal building and lengthened.

The Menongue non-directional beacon (Ident: ME) is located on the field.

== Airlines and destinations ==
Airlines	Destinations
TAAG Angola Airlines	Luanda

== National Air Force of Angola ==
The 8th Training Squadron of the 24th Training Regiment is stationed here.

== See also ==
- List of airports in Angola
- Transport in Angola
