= List of companies of Angola =

Location of Angola

Angola is a country in Southern Africa and the seventh-largest on the continent.

Angola has vast mineral and petroleum reserves, and its economy is among the fastest growing in the world, especially since the end of the civil war. In spite of this, the standard of living remains low for the majority of the population, and life expectancy and infant mortality rates in Angola are among the worst in the world. Angola's economic growth is highly uneven, with the majority of the nation's wealth concentrated in a disproportionately small sector of the population.

== Notable firms ==
This list includes notable companies with primary headquarters located in the country. The industry and sector follow the Industry Classification Benchmark taxonomy. Organizations which have ceased operations are included and noted as defunct.

Notable companies Status: P=Private, S=State; A=Active, D=Defunct
Name	Industry	Sector	Headquarters	Founded	Notes	Status	
Aeronáutica	Consumer services	Airlines	Luanda	2001	Charter airline	P	A
African Diamond Producers Association	Basic materials	Diamonds & gemstones	Luanda	2006	Policy agency for industry	P	A
Air 26	Consumer services	Airlines	Luanda	2006	Airline	P	A
Alada	Consumer services	Airlines	Luanda	1995	Airline, defunct 2010	P	D
Alfa 5	Industrials	Security Services	Luanda	1993	Security subsidiary of ENDIAMA	S	A
Ancar	Consumer goods	Automobiles	Luanda	2001	Automotive, currently inactive	P	D
Angola Air Charter	Consumer services	Airlines	Luanda	1987	Charter airline	P	A
Angola Cables	Telecommunications	Fixed line telecommunications	Luanda	2009	Fiber optics	P	A
Angola LNG	Oil & gas	Exploration & production	Soyo	2008	Natural gas	P	A
Angola Stock Exchange and Derivatives	Financials	Financial services	Luanda	2016	Exchange	P	A
Angola Telecom	Telecommunications	Fixed line telecommunications	Luanda	1992	State-owned telecommunications	S	A
Banco Angolano de Investimentos (BAI)	Financials	Banks	Luanda	1996	Private bank	P	A
Banco de Comércio e Indústria (BCI)	Financials	Banks	Luanda	1991	Bank of Commerce and Industry	S	A
Banco de Poupança e Crédito (BPC)	Financials	Banks	Luanda	1956	State-owned bank	S	A
Banco Económico	Financials	Banks	Luanda	2001	Private bank, previously a part of Banco Espírito Santo (Portugal)	P	A
Correios de Angola	Industrials	Delivery services	Luanda	1798	Postal services	S	A
Cuca beer	Consumer goods	Brewers	Luanda	1947	Brewery	P	A
Diamang	Basic materials	Diamonds & gemstones	Luanda	1917	Diamonds, defunct 1988	P	D
Diexim Expresso	Consumer services	Airlines	Luanda	2003	Airline	P	A
Edições Novembro	Consumer services	Publishing	Luanda	1923	State publisher (Jornal de Angola, Jornal de Economia, Jornal dos Desportes)	S	A
Empresa Nacional de Exploração de Aeroportos e Navegação Aérea (ENEANA)	Consumer services	Airlines	Luanda	1980	Airport and air navigation	S	A
ENDIAMA	Basic materials	Diamonds & gemstones	Luanda	1981	Diamonds, state-owned	S	A
ENSA - Seguros de Angola	Financials	Reinsurance	Luanda	1978	Insurance, re-insurance	P	A
Grupo Opaia SA	Conglomerates	-	Luanda	2002	Energy, real estate, utilities	P	A
Heli Malongo Airways	Consumer services	Airlines	Luanda	2008	Charter airline	P	A
Movicel	Telecommunications	Mobile telecommunications	Luanda	2003	Mobile phone network	P	A
MSTelcom	Telecommunications	Fixed line telecommunications	Luanda	1997	Communications subsidiary of Sonangol Group	P	A
Railway Company of Benguela (ECFB-EP)	Transports	Railway services	Lobito	1902	Transport of passengers and freight	S	A
Secil Maritima	Industrials	Marine transportation	Luanda	1987	Shipping	P	A
SODIAM	Basic materials	Diamonds & gemstones	Luanda	1999	Marketing subsidiary of ENDIAMA	S	A
Sonair	Industrials	Delivery services	Luanda	1998	Subsidiary of Sonangol Group, oil and gas industry air transport service	S	A
Sonangol Group	Oil & gas	Exploration & production	Luanda	1976	Oil and gas reserve management, state-owned	S	A
TAAG Angola Airlines	Consumer services	Airlines	Luanda	1938	Flag carrier	S	A
Teleservice	Industrials	Security services	Luanda	1993	Private security company since 2002; formerly private military company	P	A
Transafrik International	Industrials	Delivery services	Fujairah, UAE	1984	Cargo airline	P	A
Transporte Colectivo Urbano de Luanda (TCUL)	Consumer services	Travel & tourism	Luanda	1988	Bus transport	P	A
Unitel Angola	Telecommunications	Mobile telecommunications	Luanda	2001	Mobile phones	P	A
ZAP	Telecommunications	Mobile telecommunications	Luanda	2010	Satellite television provider	P	A

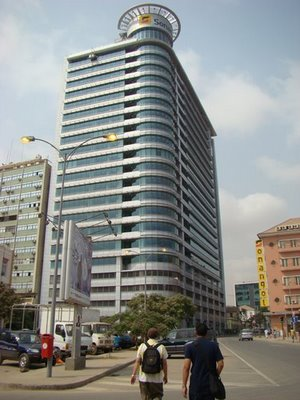
Sonangol Group head office in Luanda.

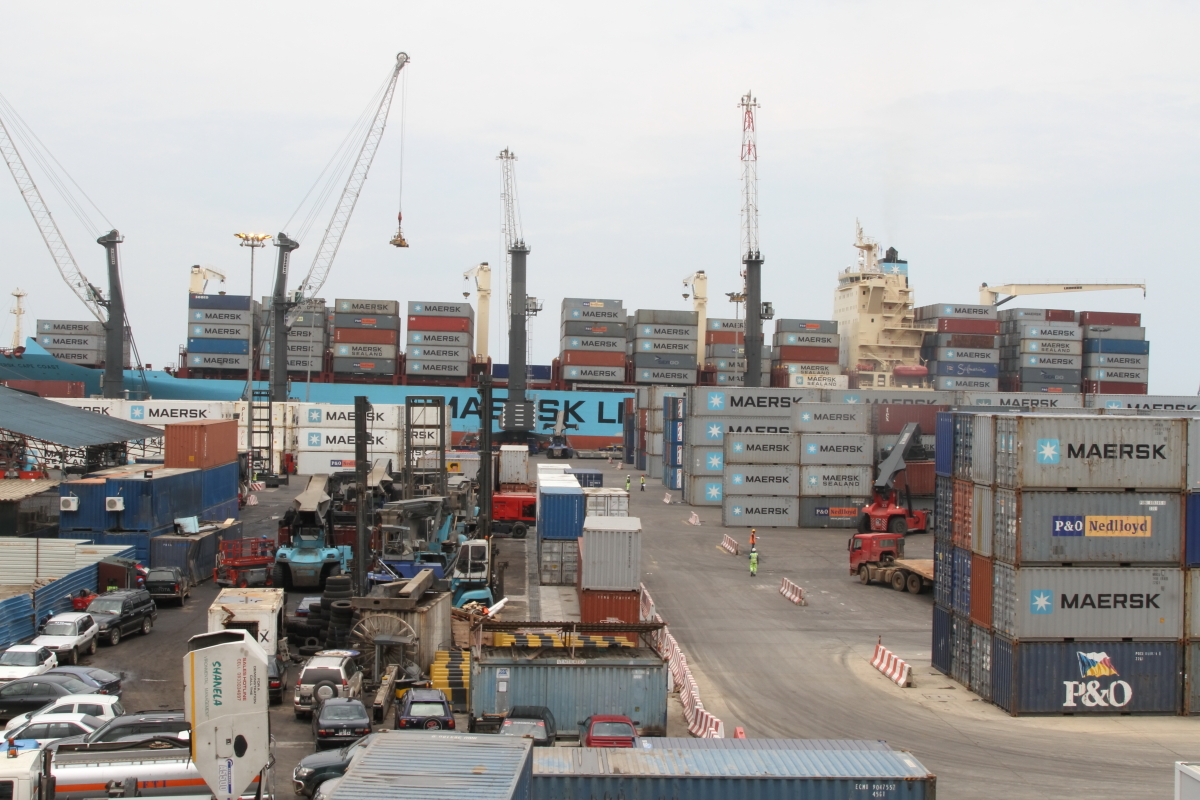
Cargo facility in Luanda.

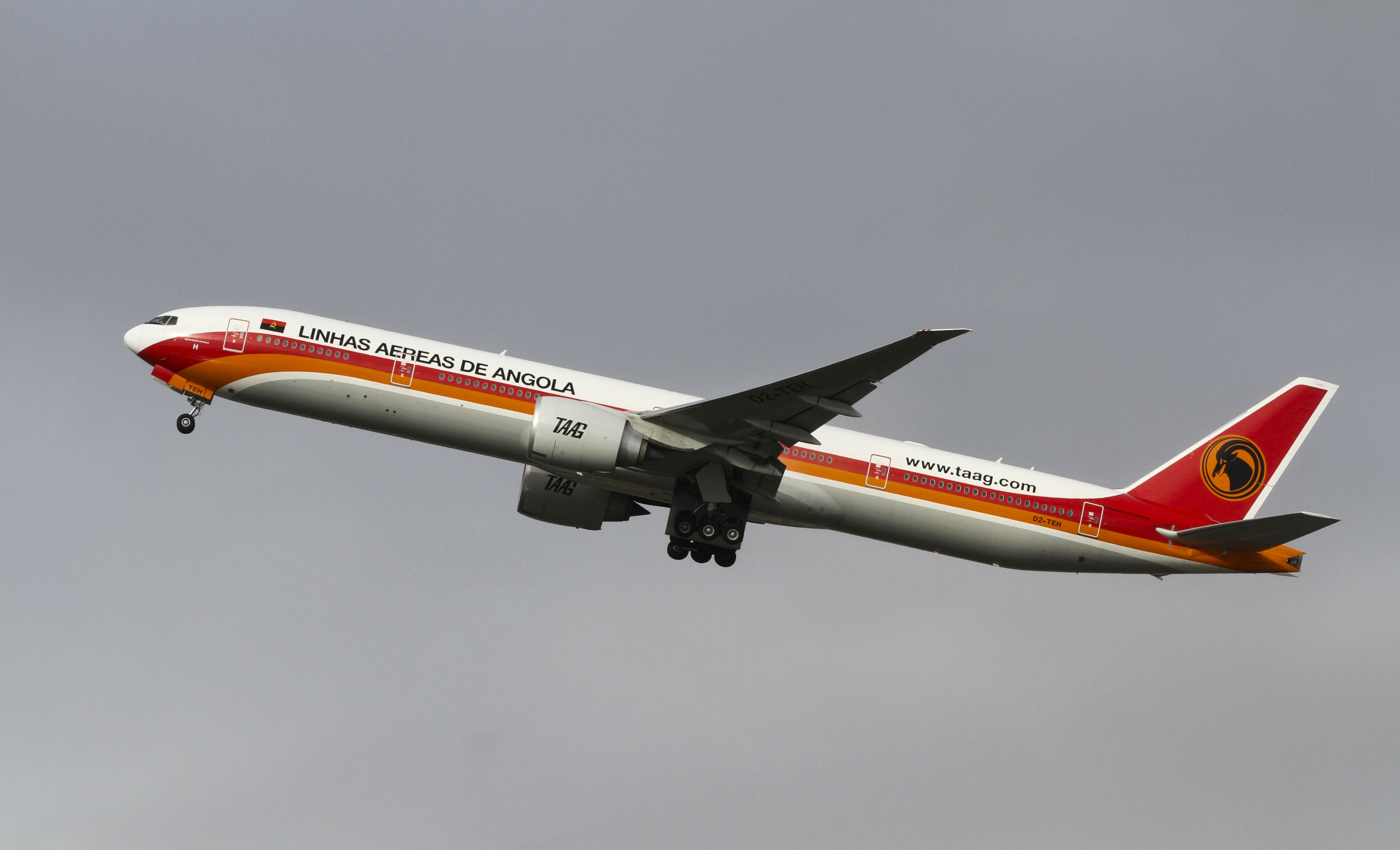
TAAG Angolan Airlines is Angola's national airline.

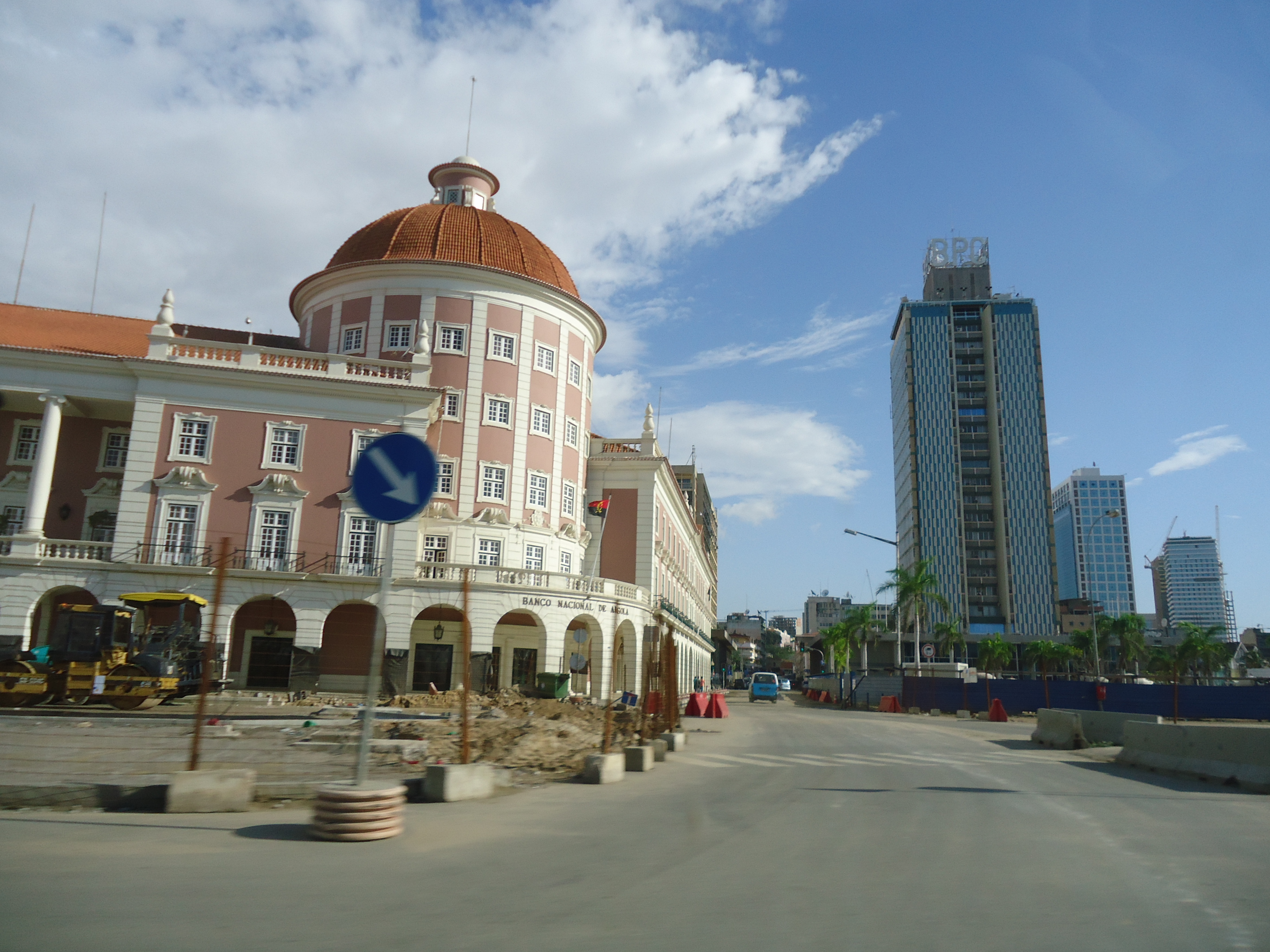
Luanda financial center.

== See also ==
- Telecommunications in Angola
