= List of defunct airlines of Angola =

This is a list of defunct airlines of Angola.

Airline	Image	IATA	ICAO	Callsign	Commenced operations	Ceased operations	Notes
ACA (Ancargo Air)			NCL	ANCARGO AIR	1998	2000	Operated Antonov An-12, Antonov An-26
Aerangol					1966	1972	Operated Beech Baron, Beech Queen Air
Aero Tropical			TPB		1996	1999	
Air 26			DCD	DUCARD	2006	2018	
Air Angol			NGO	AIR ANGOL	1997	1999	Operated Antonov An-26
Air Cassai			RCI	AIR CASSAI	1999	1999	
Air Gemini			GLL	TWINS	1999	2010	
Air Nacoia			ANL		1993	2002	Operated Antonov An-12, Antonov An-26, Boeing 707-320C, Boeing 727, Douglas DC-8
Air Nave					2001	2018	Operated Antonov An-32, Cessna Grand Caravan
Air Nocota					1992	1993	Operated Boeing 707, Boeing 727
Air Pesada (ASA Pesada)			API	ASA PESADA	1999	2001	Operated Antonov An-24
Air Pescara					2001	2001	
Alada			RAD	AIR ALADA	1995	2010	
Capricorn Flights					1994	1995	Renamed to Ibis Air
CTA (Cònsorcio Técnico de Aviação)					1978	1979	Operated BN-2 Islander
DAR (Direcção de Aeronaútica)					1979	1998	Renamed SonAir
Diexim Expresso				DIEXIM	2003	2008	
DTA (Divisão dos Transportes Aéreos)		DT	DTA	DTA	1938	1973	Renamed to TAAG Angola Airlines
Ecomex Air Cargo			ECX	AIR ECOMEX	1996	1998	
Etram Air Wing			ETM		2003	2009	
Fly540 Angola		F5			2011	2014	
Gira Globo			GGL	GIRA GLOBO	2001	2018	Operated Beech Super King Air
Ibis Air					1995	1999	Established as Capricorn Flights
Irwin Air					2002	2003	Formed by Keith Irwin and Cargo Air Transport Systems, South Africa
Linhas Aereas de Benguela					1998	2005	Operated Dornier 228
Mavewa Táxi Aéreo					1994	2018	Operated BN-2 Islander
National Commuter Airlines (Angola)					1998	2000	
Planar Airlines			PLN	PLANAIR	2002	2006	
SAL (Sociedade de Aviação Ligeira)					1992	2009	
Savanair			SVN	SAVANAIR	1994	2002	Operated Antonov An-12
Servisair (Angola)					2009	2010	
Southern Air Group					1995	1995	
TAAG		DT			1973	1976	Renamed to TAAG Angola Airlines
TAAG Charter		C3			1988	1991	Renamed to Angola Air Charter
Trans Air Welwitchia			TWW	WELWITCHIA	1995	2000	
Transaera (Transporte Aéreo de Cargas e Passageiros)					1998	1998	
Uralex					2000	2000	
VOAR (Aero Voar)			VRL	VOAR-LINHAS	1994	1998	
Von Haaf Air			VHA	AIR V-H	1994	1996	Operated Antonov An-8
Yuno					1999	1999	

== See also ==
- List of airlines of Angola
- List of airports in Angola
