= List of airlines of Angola =

This is a list of airlines that have an air operator's certificate issued by the civil aviation authority of Angola, the Instituto Nacional de Aviação Civil.

Except the two airlines with asterisk mark below, all other airlines of Angola are currently banned in the European Union.

== Airlines of Angola ==
Airline	IATA	ICAO	Image	Callsign	Commenced operations	Notes
AeroJet		TEJ			2008	
Angola Air Charter	C3;7X	AGO		ANGOLA CHARTER	1991	
SJL Aeronautica		GGL		GIRA GLOBO	2005	
Guicango						
Airjet Exploração Aérea de Carga		MBC		MABECO	2003	
TAAG Angola Airlines*	DT	DTA		ANGOLA	1940	
Serviços Executivos Aéreos de Angola		SVG		SEAA	2009	
Heli Malongo Airways*					2005	

== See also ==
- List of defunct airlines of Angola
- List of airports in Angola
- List of airlines
- List of air carriers banned in the European Union
