= TCUL =

The abbreviation TCUL stands for

- Texas Credit Union League in the United States of America
- Transporte Colectivo Urbano de Luanda, the public transit company of Luanda, the capital of Angola
- Tap changing under load, see tap changer
