= P. maritima =

P. maritima may refer to:

- Plantago maritima, the sea plantain, seaside plantain or goose tongue, a plant species
- Prunus maritima, the beach plum, a tree species native to the Atlantic coast of North America

== Synonyms ==
- Pinus maritima, a synonym for Pinus pinaster, the maritime pine, a tree species
- Piperia maritima, a synonym for Piperia elegans

== See also ==
- Maritima (disambiguation)
