= Volkswagen Passat (B6) =

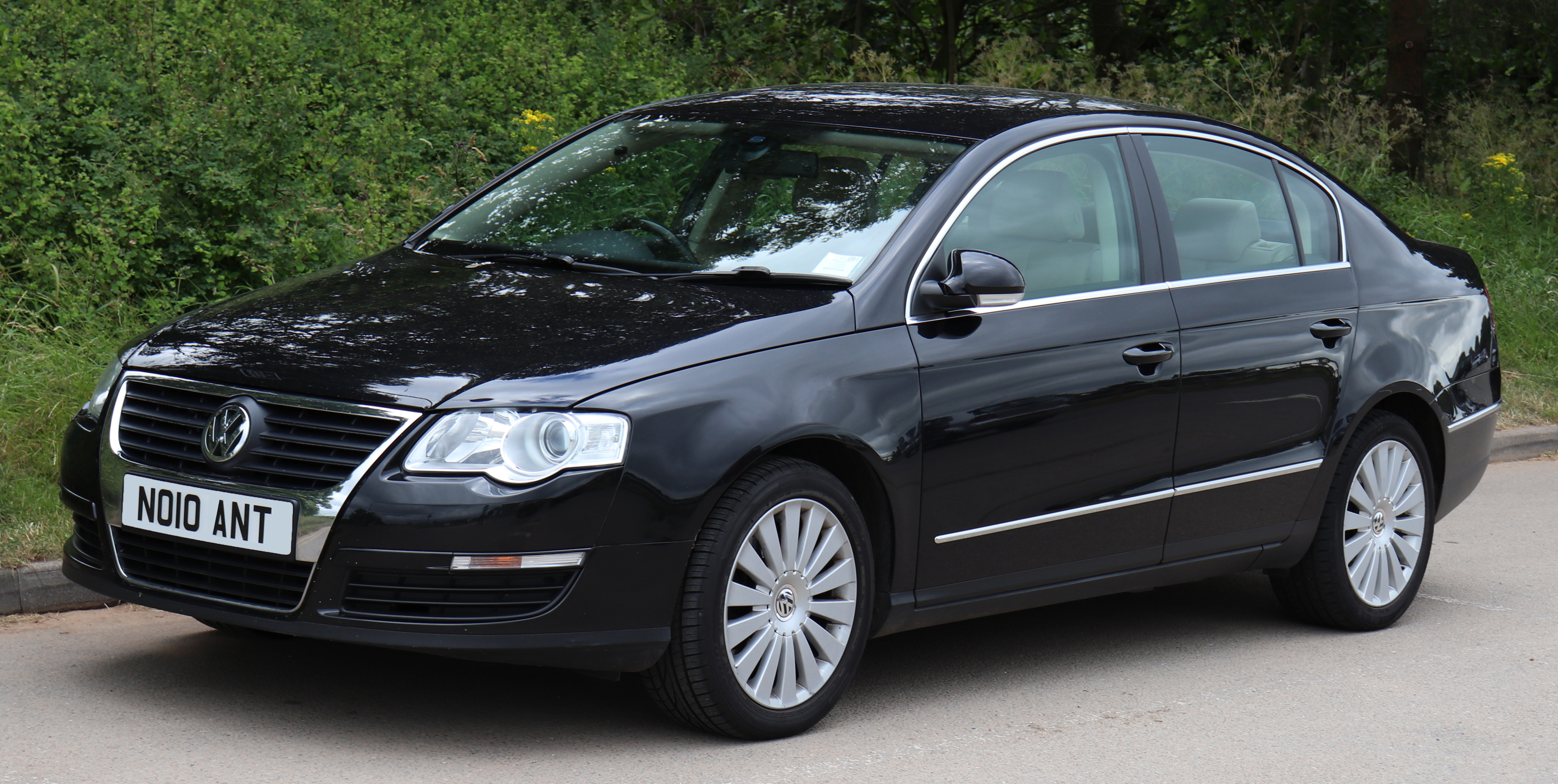

Overview
- Manufacturer: Volkswagen
- Also called: Volkswagen Magotan (China, FAW-VW); Volkswagen Variant (station wagon, China)
- Production: 2005–2010
- Assembly: Germany: Emden; Germany: Mosel/Zwickau; Russia: Kaluga; India: Aurangabad (Volkswagen India); Angola: Luanda (VW/Ancar); Ukraine: Solomonovo (Eurocar); China: Changchun (FAW-VW, Magotan only); Thailand: Bangkok (Yontrakit Group)
- Designer: Robert Lešnik

Body and chassis
- Class: Mid-size car / Large family car (D-segment)
- Body style: 4-door saloon/sedan 5-door estate/wagon 4-door coupé (Passat CC)
- Layout: Front engine, front-wheel drive or 4motion four-wheel drive
- Platform: Volkswagen Group A6 PQ46
- Related: Volkswagen Golf Mk6; Volkswagen Tiguan; Audi A3; SEAT Leon; SEAT Toledo; SEAT Altea; Škoda Octavia; Volkswagen Golf/Rabbit/GTI; Volkswagen Jetta; Volkswagen Passat CC; Škoda Superb

Powertrain
- Engine: 1.4 L I4 TSI turbo/supercharger (Petrol); 1.6 L I4 MPi (Petrol); 1.6 L I4 FSI (Petrol); 1.8 L I4 TSI (Petrol); 2.0 L I4 FSI; 2.0 L I4 TFSI; 2.0 L I4 TSI (Petrol, turbo); 3.2 L VR6 FSI (Petrol); 3.6 L VR6 FSI (Petrol); Diesel engines: 1.6 L I4 TDI CR (turbo-diesel); 1.9 L I4 TDI PD (Diesel); 2.0 L I4 TDI PD/CR (Diesel); CNG/Petrol: 1.4 L I4 TSI EcoFuel
- Transmission: 5-speed manual 6-speed manual 6-speed Tiptronic automatic 6-speed DSG dual-clutch automatic

Dimensions
- Wheelbase: 2,709 mm (106.7 in)
- Length: Sedan; 2005–2008: 4,780 mm (188.2 in); 2009–2010: 4,765 mm (187.6 in); Wagon; 4,775 mm (188.0 in)
- Width: 1,820 mm (71.7 in)
- Height: Sedan: 1,473 mm (58.0 in); Wagon: 1,516 mm (59.7 in)

Chronology
- Predecessor: Volkswagen Passat (B5)
- Successor: Volkswagen Passat (B8); Volkswagen Passat NMS

The Volkswagen Passat (B6 and B7) is a front-engine D-segment large family car manufactured and marketed by Volkswagen from 2005 to 2011 (B6) and from 2010 to 2015 (B7, facelift). Respectively the six and seventh generation Passat, and internally designated B6 and B7, they were marketed in sedan and wagon bodystyles in front-wheel as well as all-wheel drive configurations, with a range of petrol and diesel engines.

The B6 debuted at the Geneva Motor Show in March 2005, and launched in Europe in the summer of 2005, using a long-wheelbase version of the fifth-generation Golf and Jetta, along with a transverse engine layout. B6 Passats were marketed globally, and superseded in North America by a model exclusively manufactured at Volkswagen's Chattanooga Assembly Plant. VW debuted the B7 facelift at the Paris Motor Show in September 2010 and continued to market B7 models globally outside North America.

In Asia, the PQ46 Passat was released by FAW-VW as the Magotan, after Volkswagen's other joint venture Shanghai Volkswagen had decided to continue using the B5 platform for the Passat and the Passat Lingyu (long-wheelbase Passat). Since August 2010, the wagon version of Passat B6 was available in Asia, which is a fully imported model. But this car is simply called Volkswagen Variant in China, in order not to refer the name "Passat" or "Magotan".

Notable variations included the Passat CC, a sedan variant with revised styling, along with the R36 variant, featuring the VR6 engine. The all-wheel drive version, marketed as 4Motion, uses a Haldex Traction multi-plate clutch. A B7 all wheel drive wagon was marketed as the Alltrack and sedan and wagons were also marketed in China.

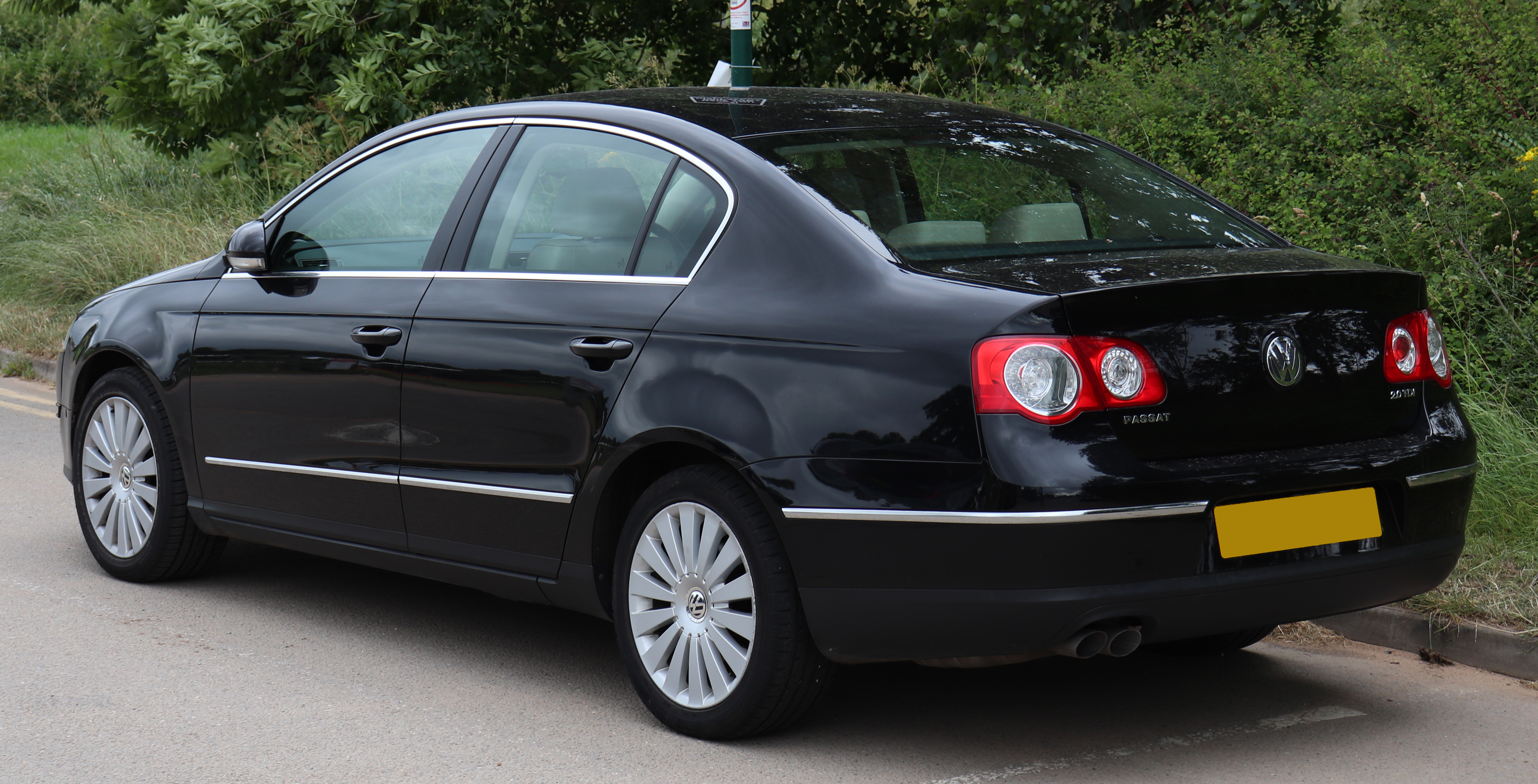
Saloon (pre-facelift)

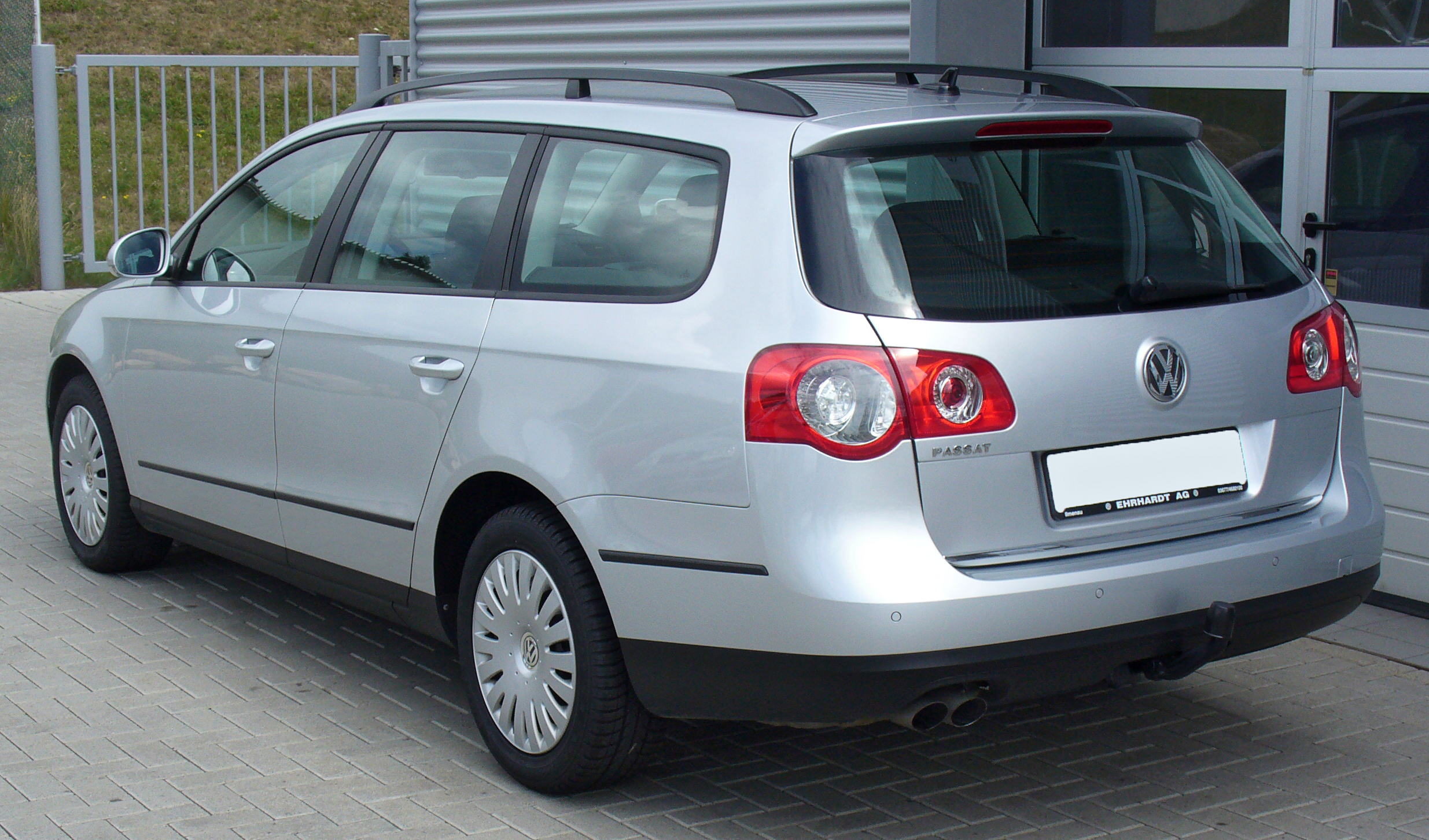
Variant (pre-facelift)

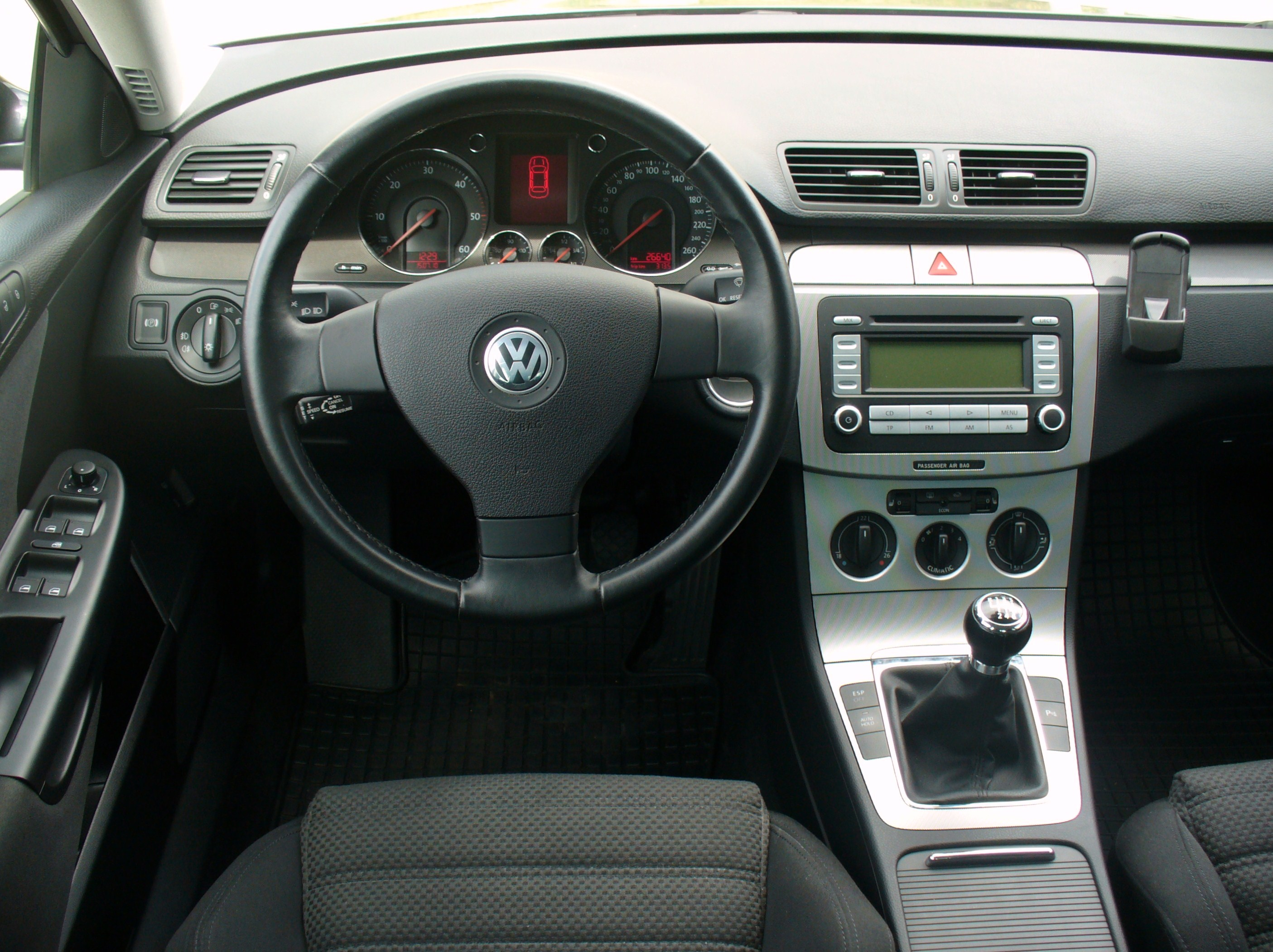
Interior (pre-facelift)

== Technology ==
The B6 Passat is based on a modified version of the Mk5 Golf's PQ35 platform (PQ46), no longer shared its platform with Audi's equivalent model (the Audi A4). The PQ46 platform provided increased torsional rigidity.

The B6 featured a transverse engine, rather than a longitudinal engine of itts predecessors. This required the four-wheel drive version, marketed as 4Motion, to switch from the Torsen centre differential of the B5, to the Haldex Traction multi-plate clutch. The change to the Haldex system also changes the handling closer to a front-wheel drive car. Compared to the Torsen, the Haldex can direct torque more unequally to the front wheels (from 100:0 to 50:50 front-to-rear bias), thus providing a wider bias range than the 75:25 to 25:75 of the B5 Passat. Haldex is a reactive-type system, behaving as a front-wheel-drive vehicle until slippage is detected, at which point up to a maximum of 50% of the torque can be transmitted to the rear axle. See the Audi-related quattro (four-wheel-drive system) article for more information.

A driverless version of the Passat Wagon finished second in the 2007 DARPA Urban Challenge. In spring 2015, Swiss telecommunications company Swisscom tested the driverless Volkswagen Passat on the streets of Zürich.

== Notable variations ==
=== Passat R36 ===
At the Frankfurt Motor Show in September 2007, Volkswagen launched the 'R Line' R36, created by Volkswagen Individual GmbH.

The R36 uses a 3.6 litre VR6 engine rated 221 kW; 296 bhp (300 PS) and 350 N⋅m (258 lbf⋅ft) of torque, which pushes the saloon and Variant (estate/wagon) to 100 km/h (62.1 mph) in 5.6 and 5.8 seconds respectively. The name "R36" is derived from the engine displacement, 3.6-litres.

The R36 features redesigned front and rear spoilers, four wheel drive, DSG gearbox with paddleshift on the flat-bottom steering wheel, 18" Omanyt aluminium alloy wheels, 20 mm (0.8 in) lowered suspension, 'R' engraved stainless steel pedals, Recaro seats with R36 logo, heated front and rear seats, Bi-Xenon headlights with cornering function, and twin rear muffler tailpipes.

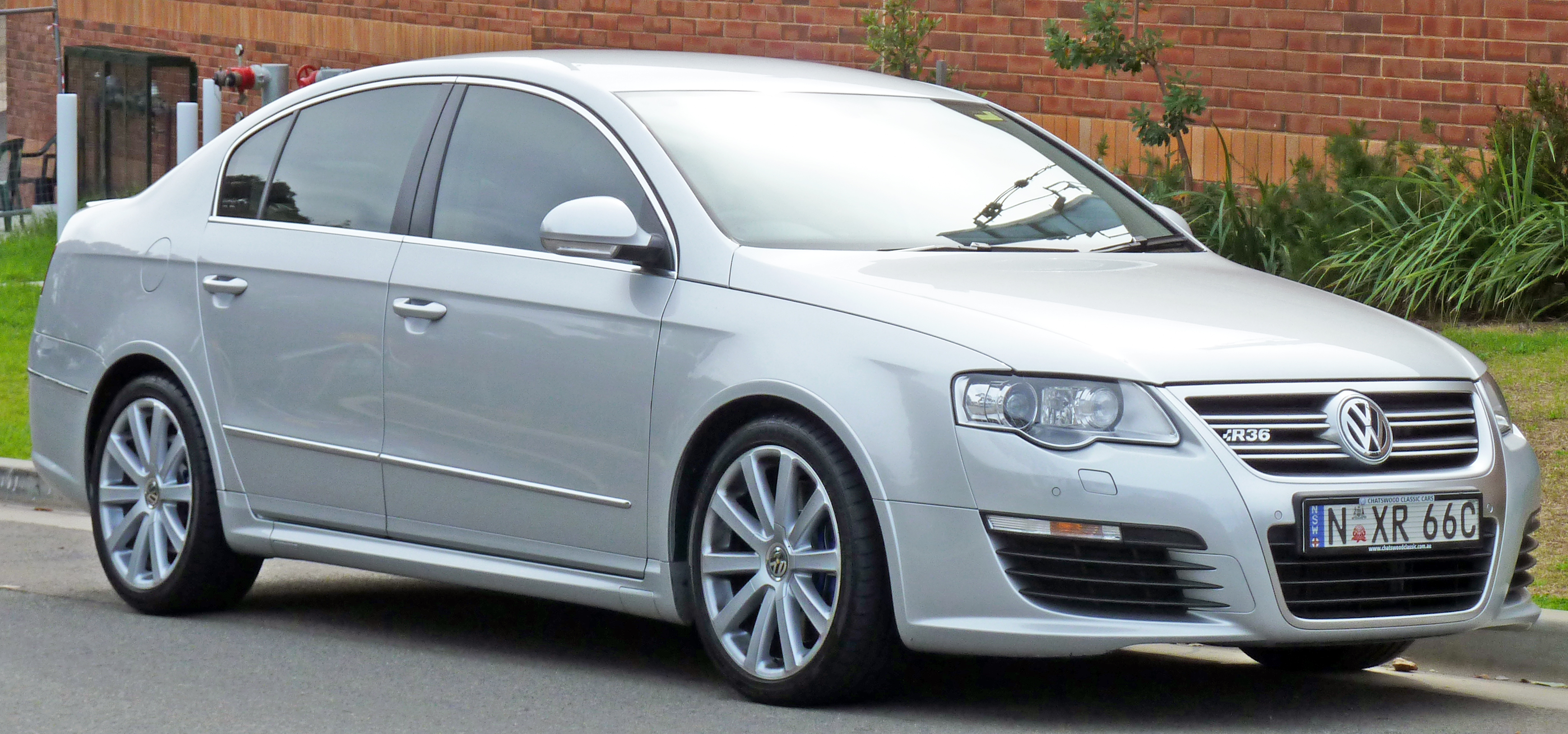
Saloon (front)

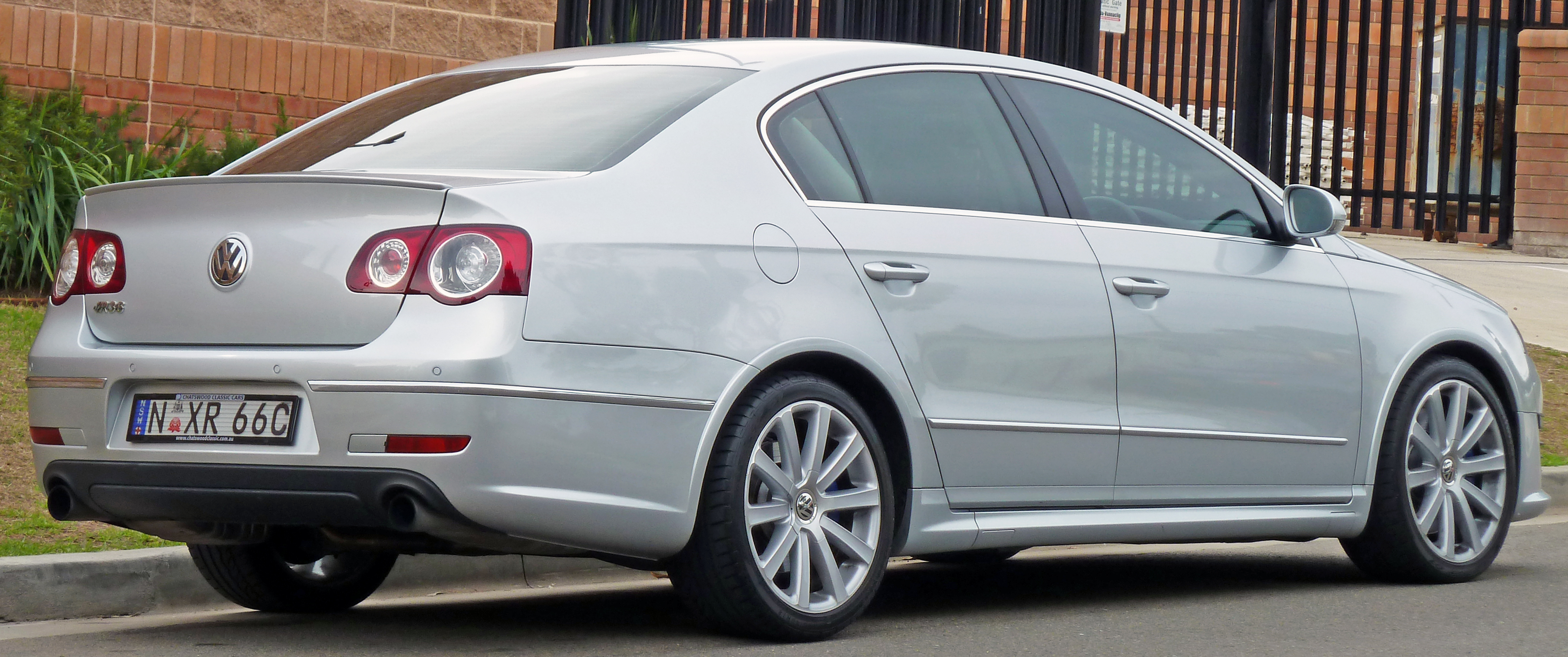
Saloon (back)

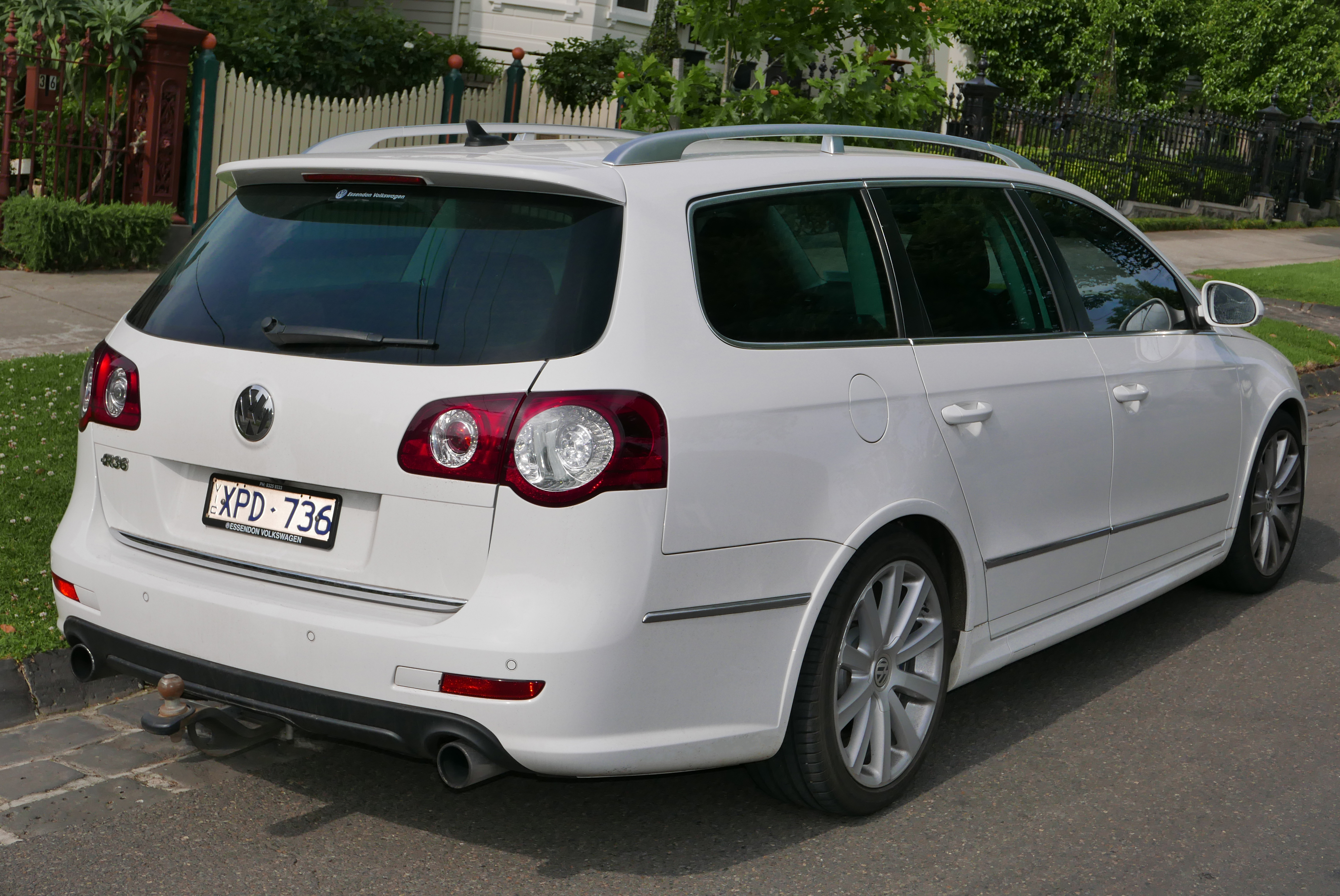
Variant

=== Passat CC ===
The CC ("Comfort Coupé") is a 4-door "coupé" version of the Passat. It debuted at the 2008 North American International Auto Show in Detroit. Originally aimed at competing with the similarly styled Mercedes CLS, the Passat CC intends to be more stylish and luxurious than the previously released Passat B6. In the U.S., the name "Passat" was dropped, and the car is being sold as "CC". Some options specific to the CC include hands-free parking, lane-departure prevention, intelligent cruise control, and adaptive suspension. Engines offered in the CC mirror those of the regular Passat, with options of the base 2.0-liter turbocharged four-cylinder, or the optional 3.6-liter V-6, which includes 4-motion all wheel drive. Although the CC is marketed as a more luxurious Passat B6, it comes in with a lower price tag. While the MSRP of a Passat B6 is $29,300, the CC comes with a base price of $27,100.

The Chinese-made CC was released by FAW-VW on July 15, 2010. Two engine options are provided: 1.8T and 2.0T.

Volkswagen facelifted the Passat CC in late 2011 for the 2012 year, with styling updates akin to those of the larger Phaeton. For the updated model, Volkswagen has dropped the Passat name for all markets, now matching the Volkswagen CC branding used since 2008 in North America.

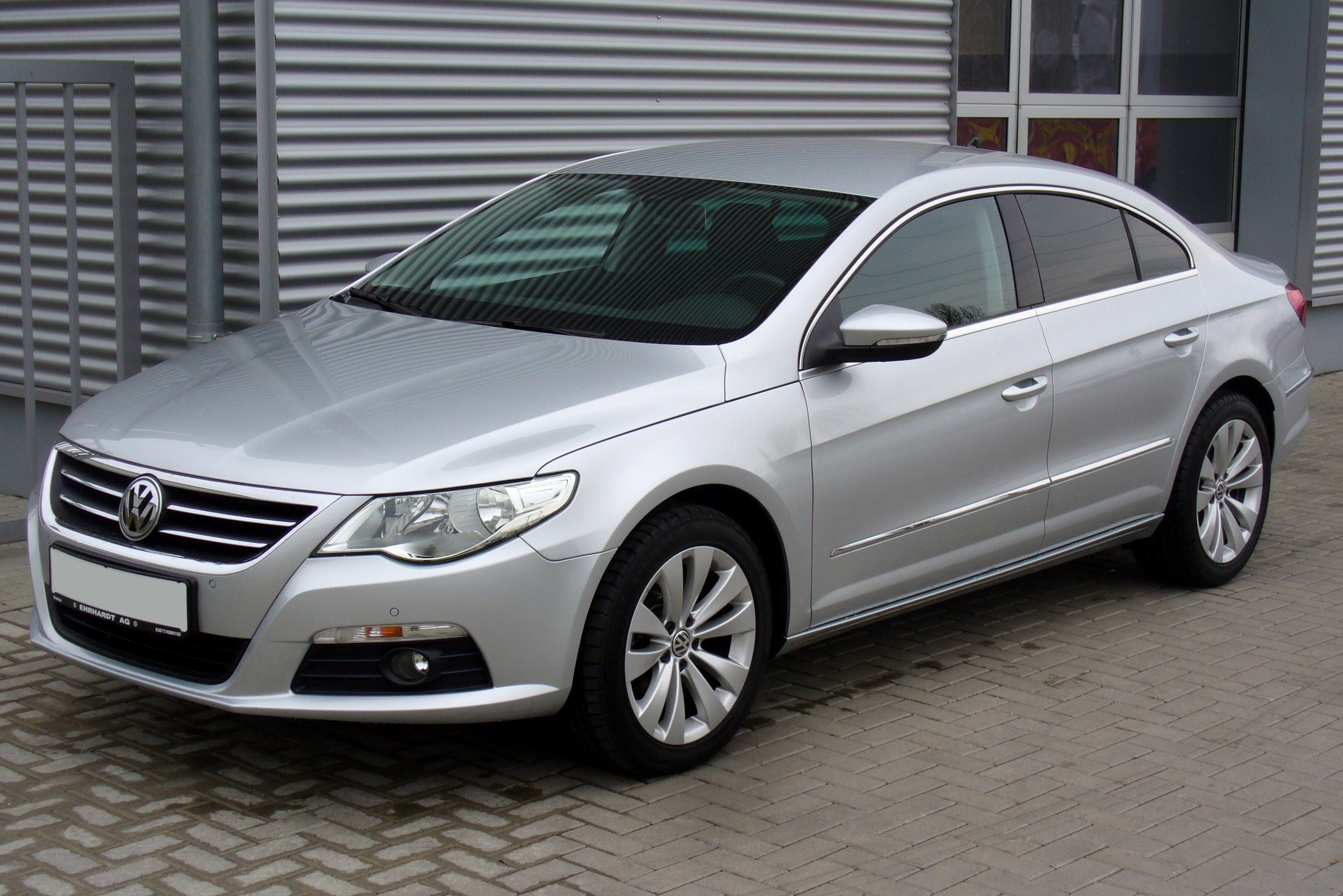
Front (pre-facelift)

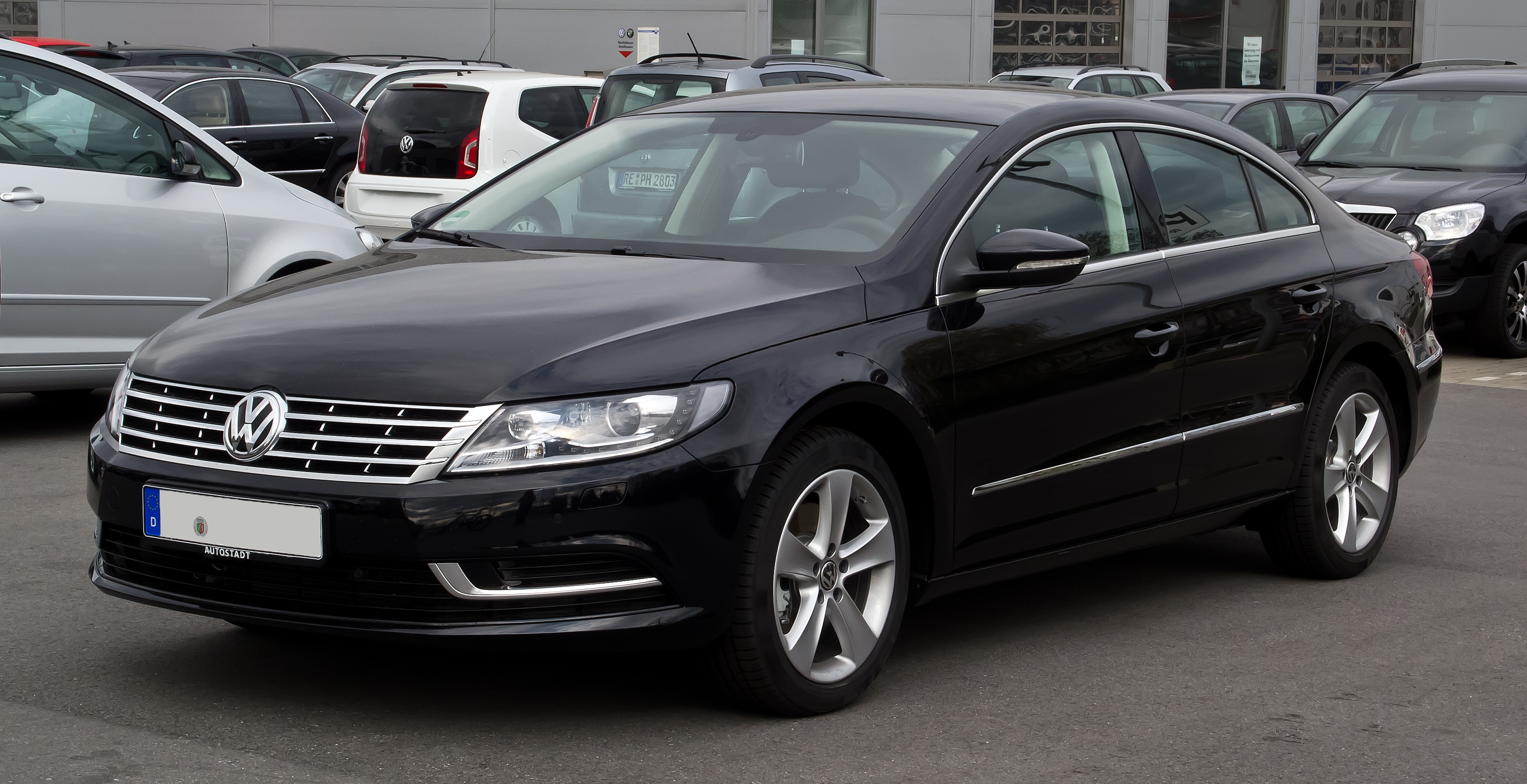
Front (facelift)

== 2010 facelift (B7) ==
Volkswagen Passat (B7)
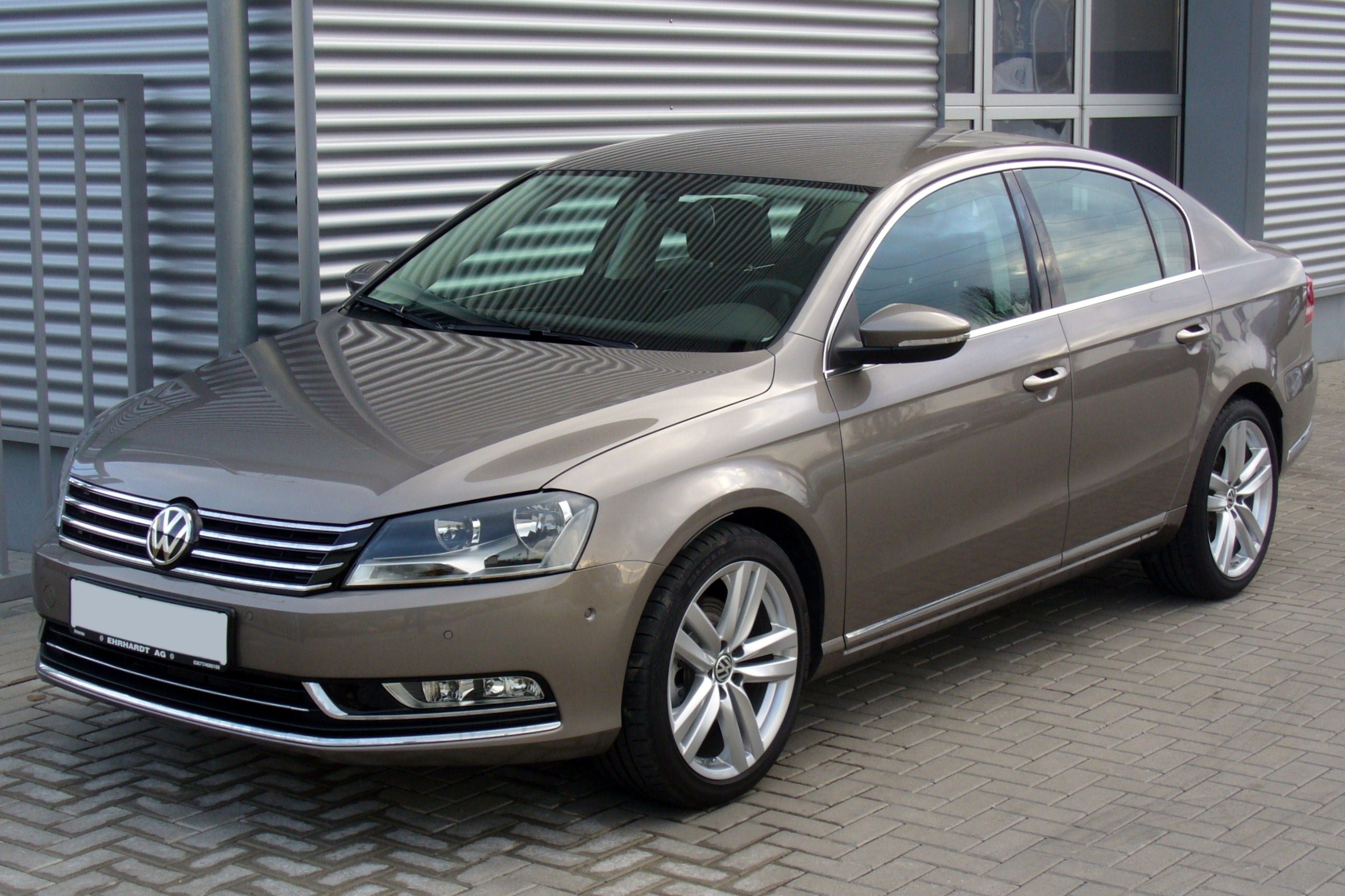

Overview
- Manufacturer: Volkswagen
- Also called: Volkswagen Magotan (China, FAW-VW); Volkswagen Variant (China); Pyeonghwa Zunma 2008 (North Korea)
- Production: 2010–2015
- Assembly: Germany: Emden; Germany: Mosel/Zwickau; Russia: Kaluga; India: Aurangabad (CKD); Angola: Luanda (VW/Ancar); Ukraine: Solomonovo (Eurocar); China: Changchun (FAW-VW, sedan only); Malaysia: Pekan (HICOM Automotive Manufacturers (Malaysia))

Body and chassis
- Class: Mid-size car / Large family car (D-segment)
- Body style: 4-door saloon/sedan 5-door estate/wagon 4-door coupé (Passat CC)
- Layout: Front engine, front-wheel drive or 4motion four-wheel drive
- Platform: Volkswagen Group A6 PQ46
- Related: Volkswagen Golf Mk6; Volkswagen Tiguan; Audi A3; SEAT Leon; SEAT Toledo; SEAT Altea; Škoda Octavia; Volkswagen Golf/Rabbit/GTI; Volkswagen Jetta; Volkswagen Passat CC

Powertrain
- Engine: Petrol: 1.4 L I4 TSI (turbo/supercharger); 1.8 L I4 TSI (turbo); 2.0 L I4 TSI (turbo); 3.0 L VR6 FSI (China, B7L); 3.6 L VR6 FSI; Petrol CNG: 1.4 L I4 TSI EcoFuel; Diesel: 1.6 L I4 TDI CR; 2.0 L I4 TDI CR
- Transmission: 5-speed manual 6-speed manual 6-speed Tiptronic (Only USA); 6-speed DSG dual-clutch automatic 7-speed DSG dual-clutch automatic

Dimensions
- Wheelbase: 2,711 mm (106.7 in); FAW-VW Magotan B7: 2,812 mm (110.7 in)
- Length: Sedan; 4,769 mm (187.8 in); FAW-VW Magotan B7: 4,865 mm (191.5 in); Wagon; 4,771 mm (187.8 in)
- Width: 1,820 mm (71.7 in)
- Height: Sedan: 1,490 mm (58.7 in); Wagon: 1,536 mm (60.5 in)

Chronology
- Predecessor: Volkswagen Passat (B6)
- Successor: Volkswagen Passat (B8); Volkswagen Passat NMS

The B6 Passat was facelifted by Klaus Bischoff and Walter de Silva, and was unveiled at the Paris Motor Show in September 2010 and arrived at European dealerships in December 2010. The B7 facelift revised all external body panels (except roof and glasshouse), a revised grille and headlights, and minor changes to the interior. Overall height and width dimensions remained unchanged, while the length was increased by 4 mm. New features include Adaptive Chassis Control (DCC), Dynamic Light Assist glare-free high beams, a fatigue detection system and an automatic "city emergency braking" system.

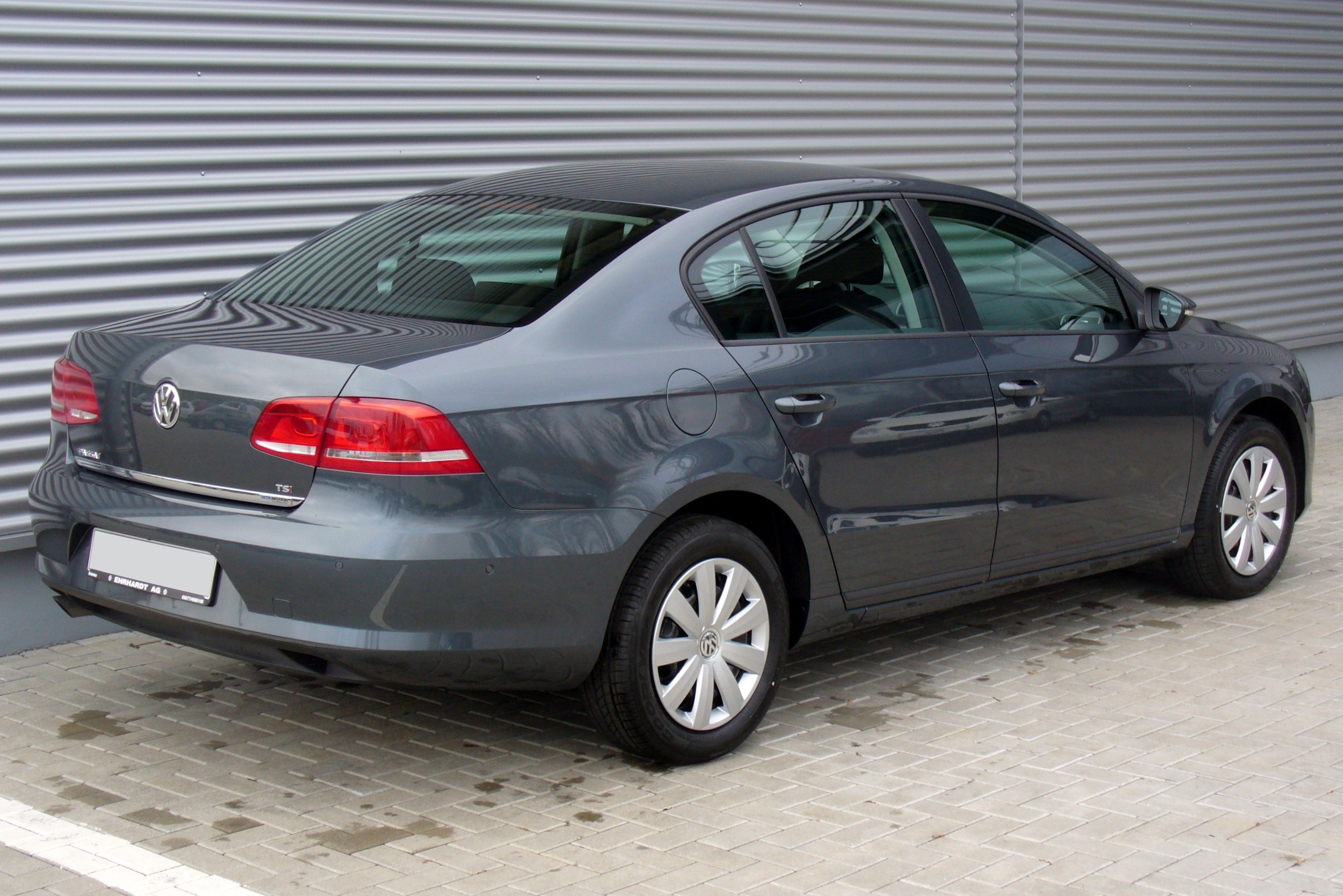
Saloon (facelift)

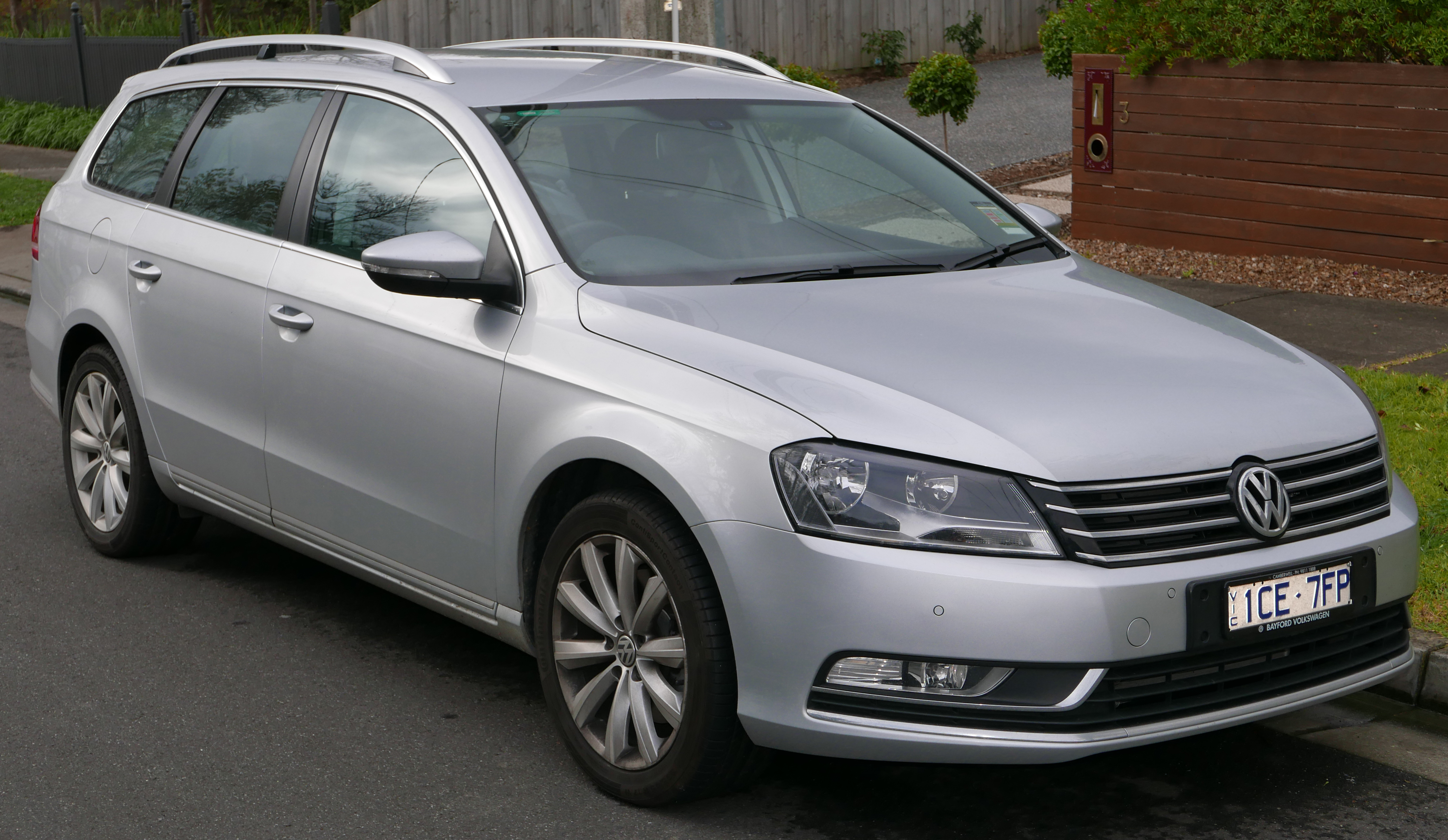
Variant (facelift)

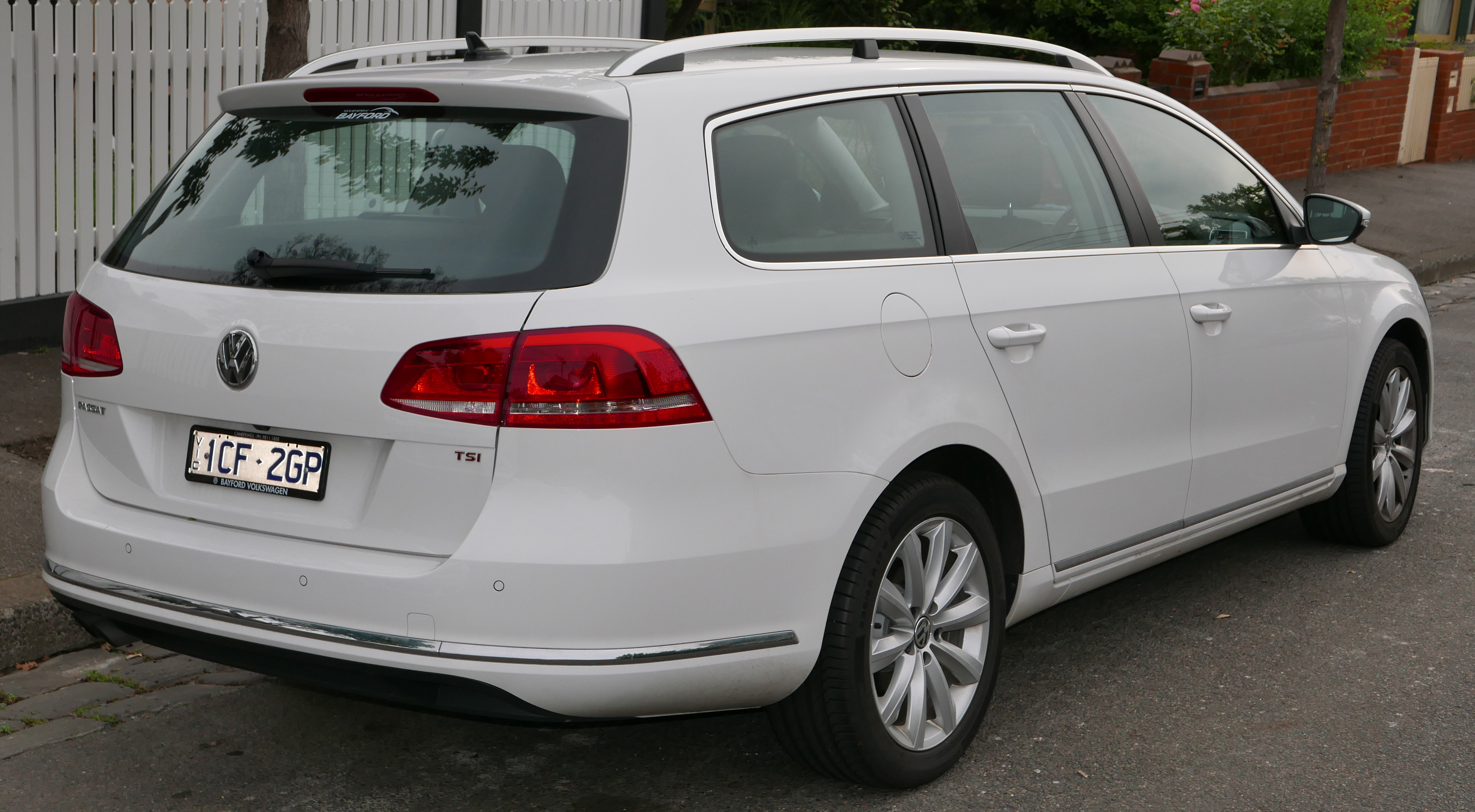
Variant (facelift)

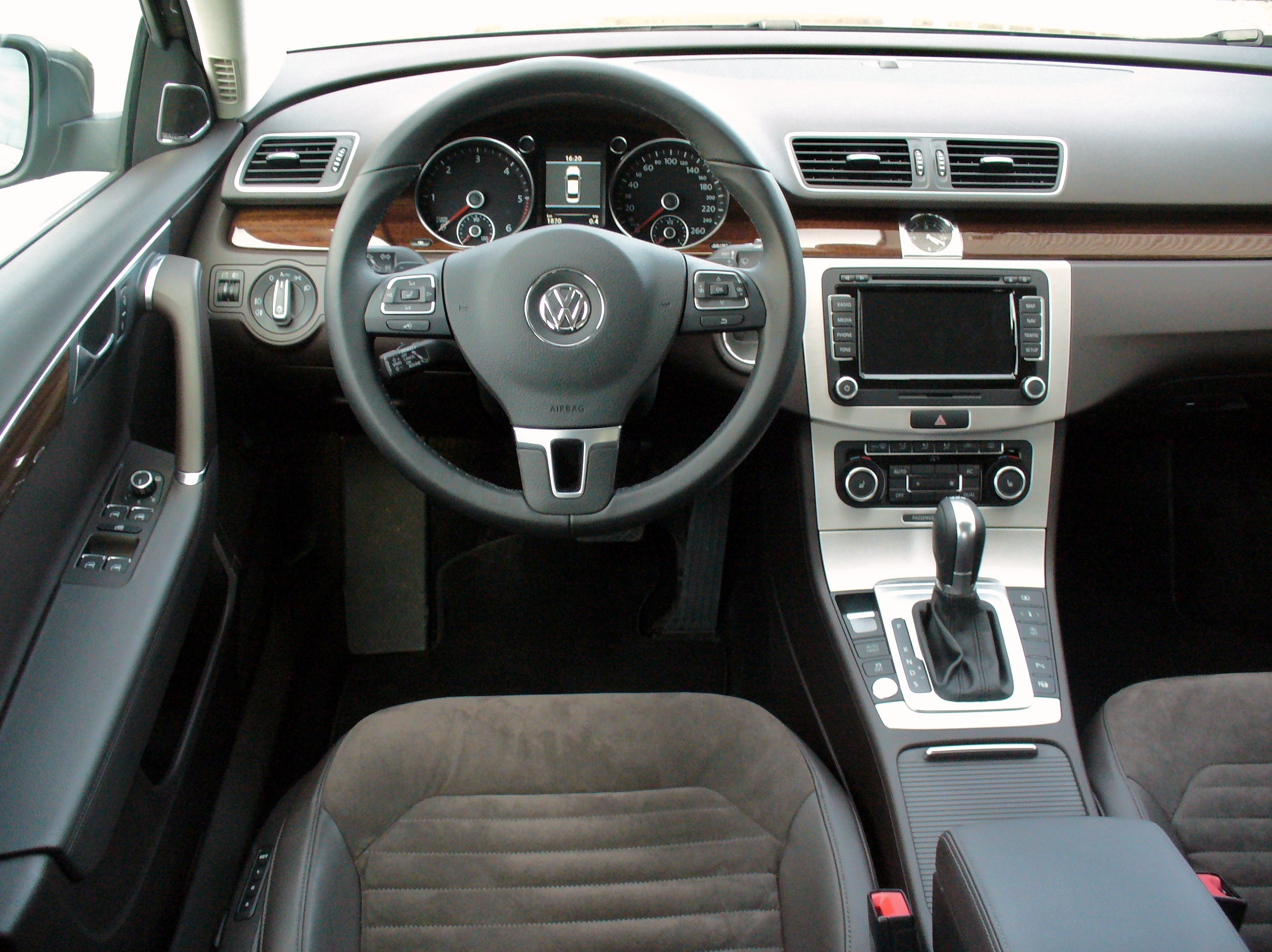
Interior (facelift)

=== Passat Alltrack ===
In October 2010, the Passat Alltrack debuted at the 2010 Tokyo Motor Show, bridges the gap between Volkswagen passenger car and SUV ranges.

The Passat Alltrack has raised ground clearance from 135 to 165 mm which improves approach angle from 13.5 to 16 degrees, departure angle from 11.9 to 13.6 degrees and ramp angle from 9.5 to 12.8 degrees when compared to the standard Passat wagon. Passat Alltrack is the only VW in the passenger range to offer 4Motion with off-road driving programme, the off-road system works in conjunction with the ABS, electronic differential lock (EDL), DSG and hill descent assist system to control the vehicle in an off-road expedition.

The engine range of the Passat Alltrack consists of two 2.0 L TDI with outputs of 103 kW/140 hp and 125 kW/170 hp and two petrol engines, 1.8 L producing 118 kW/160 hp and 2.0 L TSI producing 155 kW/207 hp. The TDI models come standard with BlueMotion Technology packages with Stop/Start system and battery regeneration mode for recovering braking energy. The two lesser powered engine variants 2.0 L TDI and 1.8 L TSI are only available in front wheel drive format with a manual 6 speed transmission. The rest of the range with 4Motion has a 6 speed DSG automated manual transmission, except the 2.0 L TDI with 103 kW/140 hp has an option of 6 speed manual.

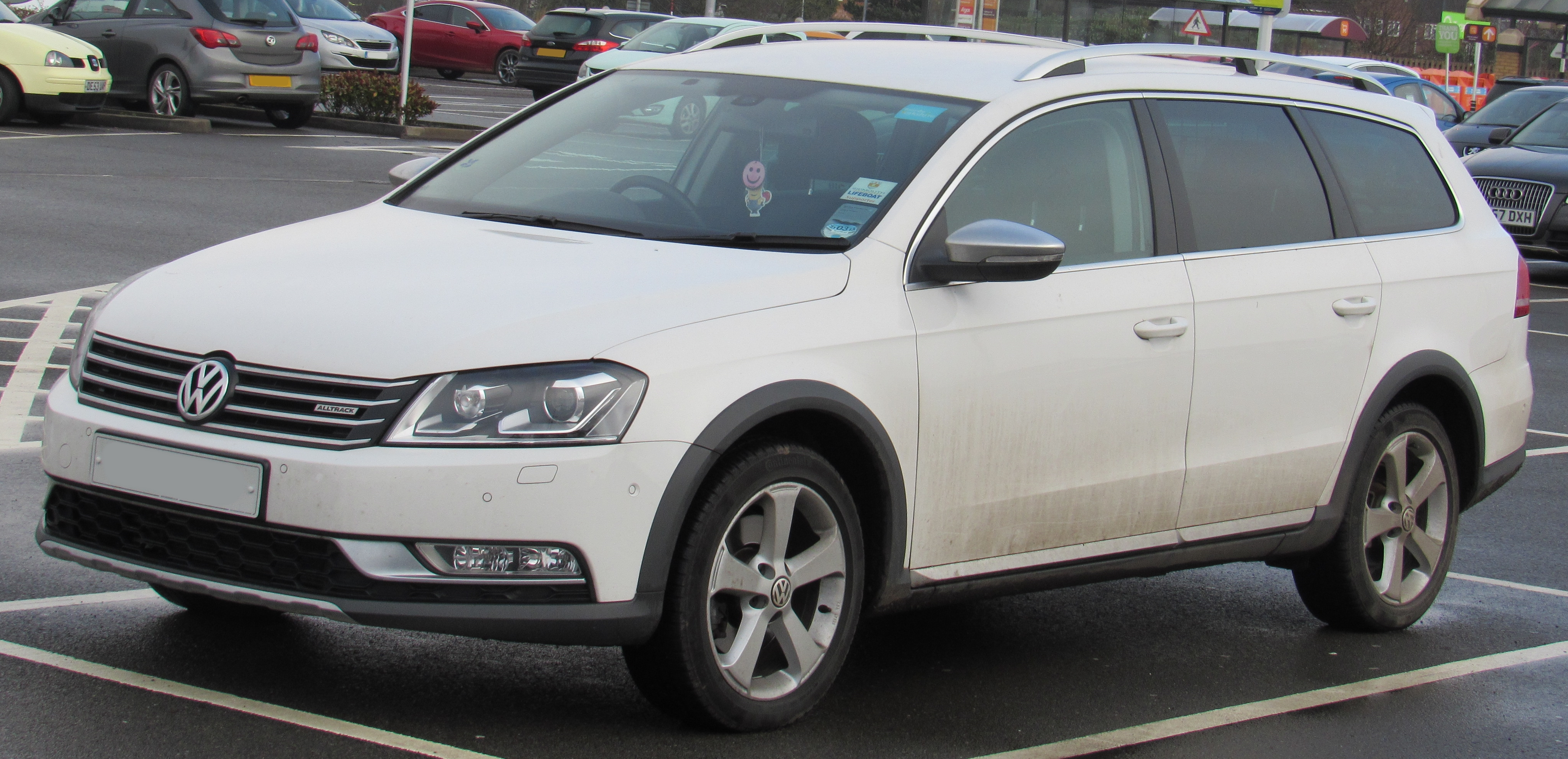
Front

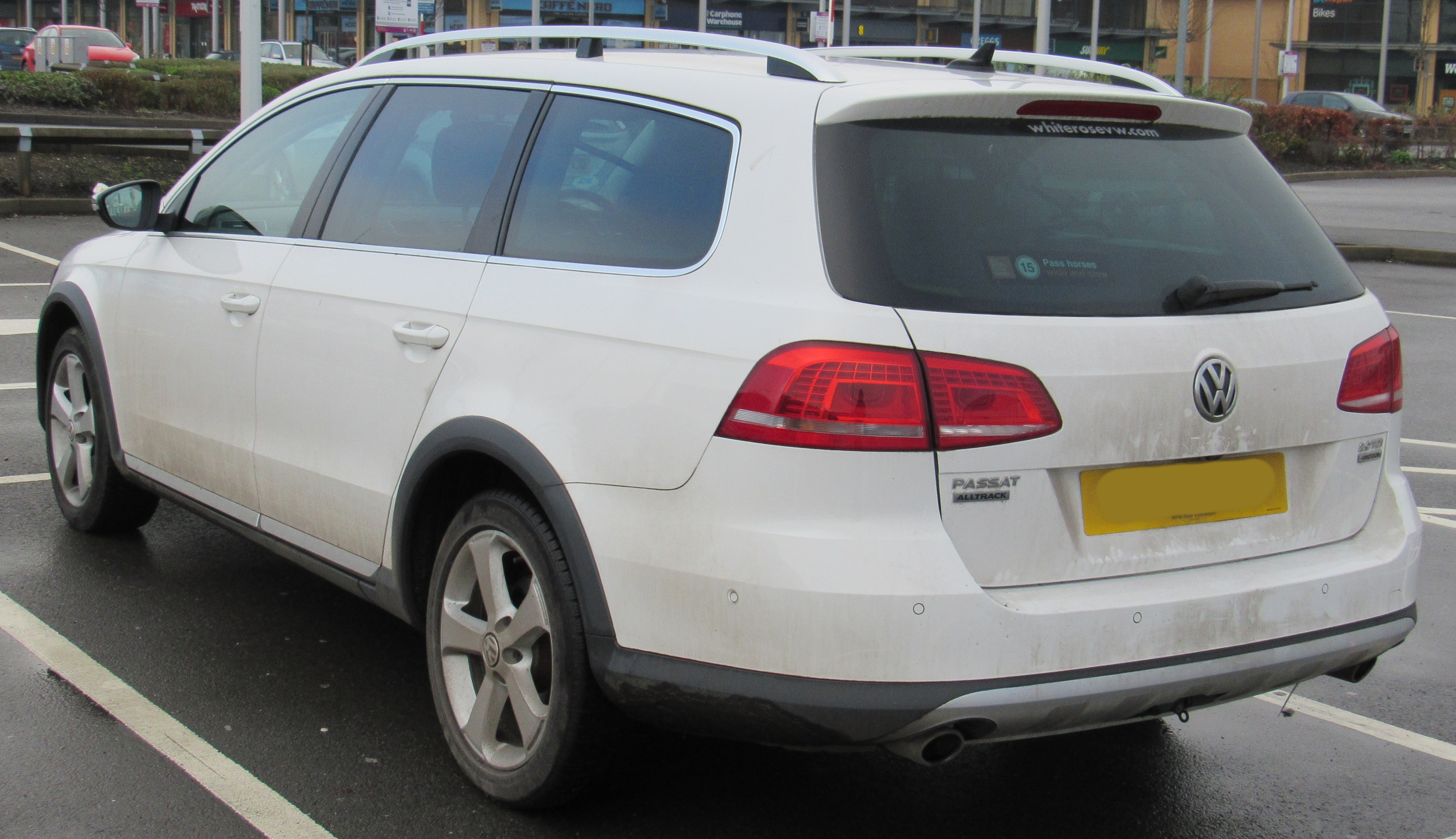
Back

== China ==
In China, the PQ46 Passat was released by FAW-Volkswagen (Volkswagen Group China subsidiary FAW-Volkswagen (FAW-VW) as the Magotan since July 2007, after Volkswagen's other joint venture in China, Shanghai Volkswagen Automotive (SVW), had decided to use the B5 platform for the Passat and the Passat Lingyu (long-wheelbase Passat). Since August 2010 the wagon version of Passat B6 will be offered in China, which is a fully imported model. But this car is simply called Volkswagen Variant in China, in order not to refer the name "Passat" or "Magotan".

In China, the FAW-VW-built Magotan was also replaced by a long-wheelbase version of the Passat B7. The new model will be exclusive to the Chinese market, and at least 100 mm longer than the European B7. Engines available for Magotan B7L are ranging from 1.4-litre T, 1.8-litre T to 2.0-litre T, a special-developed EA390 3.0-litre VR6 FSI engine is opted for the top model.

== Malaysia ==
On December 21, 2010 an agreement to assemble Volkswagen vehicles in Malaysia was signed between DRB-Hicom and Volkswagen AG, which followed the MOU signed by both parties in August of that year aimed at investigating the possibility of local vehicle production. The first locally assembled VW model to be rolled out from DRB-Hicom's Pekan plant in Pahang state, Malaysia, was the Volkswagen Passat in 2012.

== Engines ==
Fuel Stratified Injection is used in nearly every petrol engined version of the Passat, ranging from 1.6 to 3.6 litres (the 1.6-litre DOHC can reach 100 km/h (62.1 mph) in 11.5 seconds, and 200 km/h (124.3 mph) for manual transmission versions), and the multi-valve 2.0-litre Turbocharged Direct Injection (TDI) I4 diesel is available in both 140 PS (103 kW; 138 hp) and 170 PS (125 kW; 168 hp) variants. In the U.S. market, a 200 PS (147 kW; 197 hp) 2.0-litre turbocharged I4 was offered along with the 280 PS (206 kW; 276 hp) 3.6-litre VR6 engine, with six-speed manual (only available on the base 2.0 T model) and automatic transmissions. As of the 2009 model year, the VR6 engine and 4motion option were discontinued on US Passats.

B6 petrol engines
Model	Engine Code	Engine Type	Displacement	Power@rpm	Torque@rpm	Years	Top speed (km/h)
1.4 TSI	CAXA	I4 DOHC 16V FSI turbo	1,390 cc (85 cu in)	122 PS (90 kW; 120 hp) @ 5000	200 N⋅m (148 lb⋅ft) @ 1500-4000	2007-2015	203
1.6	BSE / BSF / CCSA	I4 SOHC 8V MPI	1,595 cc (97 cu in)	102 PS (75 kW; 101 hp) @ 5600	148 N⋅m (109 lb⋅ft) @ 3800	2005-2010	190
1.6 FSI	BLF / BLP	I4 DOHC 16V FSI	1,598 cc (98 cu in)	115 PS (85 kW; 113 hp) @ 6000	155 N⋅m (114 lb⋅ft) @ 4000	2005–2008	200
1.8 TSI	BZB	I4 DOHC 16V FSI turbo	1,798 cc (110 cu in)	160 PS (118 kW; 158 hp) @ 5000	250 N⋅m (184 lb⋅ft) @ 1500-4200	2007-2010	220
1.8 TSI	CDAA	I4 DOHC 16V FSI turbo	1,798 cc (110 cu in)	160 PS (118 kW; 158 hp) @ 4500-6200	250 N⋅m (184 lb⋅ft) @ 1500-4500	2008-2010	?
2.0 FSI	BLR / BVX / BVY	I4 DOHC 16V FSI	1,984 cc (121 cu in)	150 PS (110 kW; 148 hp) @ 6000	200 N⋅m (148 lb⋅ft) @ 3500	2005–2010	213
2.0 Turbo FSI	AXX / BWA / BPY	I4 DOHC 16V FSI turbo	1,984 cc (121 cu in)	200 PS (147 kW; 197 hp) @ 5100-6000	280 N⋅m (207 lb⋅ft) @ 1700-5000	2005-2008	235
2.0 TSI	CAWB	I4 DOHC 16V FSI turbo	1,984 cc (121 cu in)	200 PS (147 kW; 197 hp) @ 5100-6000	280 N⋅m (207 lb⋅ft) @ 1700-5000	2008-2010	235
2.0 TSI	CCTA / CBFA	I4 DOHC 16V FSI turbo	1,984 cc (121 cu in)	200 PS (147 kW; 197 hp) @ 5100-6000	280 N⋅m (207 lb⋅ft) @ 1800-5000	2008-2013	235
3.2 V6 FSI	AXZ	VR6 DOHC 24V FSI	3,189 cc (195 cu in)	250 PS (184 kW; 247 hp) @ 6250	330 N⋅m (243 lb⋅ft) @ 2750-3750	2005-2010	246
3.6 V6 FSI	BLV	VR6 DOHC 24V FSI	3,597 cc (220 cu in)	280 PS (206 kW; 276 hp) @ 6200	360 N⋅m (266 lb⋅ft) @ 2750	2005-2018	250
R36	BWS	VR6 DOHC 24V FSI	3,597 cc (220 cu in)	300 PS (220 kW; 300 hp) @ 6600	360 N⋅m (266 lb⋅ft) @ 2400-5300	2008-2010	250
B6 petrol/natural gas engines
Model	Engine Code	Engine Type	Displacement	Power@rpm	Torque@rpm	Years	Top speed (km/h)
1.4 TSI EcoFuel	CDGA	I4 DOHC 16V FSI twincharger	1,390 cc (85 cu in)	150 PS (110 kW; 148 hp) @ 5500	220 N⋅m (162 lb⋅ft) @ 1500-4500	2008-2010	

B6 diesel engines
Model	Engine Code	Engine Family	Engine Type	Displacement	Power@rpm	Torque@rpm	Years	Top speed (km/h)
1.6 TDI	CAYC	EA189	I4 DOHC common rail turbo with DPF	1,598 cc (98 cu in)	105 PS (77 kW; 104 hp)	250 N⋅m (184 lb⋅ft)	2009-2010	193
1.9 TDI	BKC / BXE / BLS		I4 SOHC 8V turbo with Pumpe Düse (PD) injectors optional DPF	1,896 cc (116 cu in)	105 PS (77 kW; 104 hp) @ 4000	250 N⋅m (184 lb⋅ft) @ 1900	2005–2009	188
2.0 TDI	CBDC	EA189	I4 DOHC 16V common rail turbo	1,968 cc (120 cu in)	110 PS (81 kW; 108 hp) @ 4200	250 N⋅m (184 lb⋅ft) @ 1500-2500	2008–2010	192
2.0 TDI	BMM / BMP		I4 SOHC 8V turbo with PD injectors	1,968 cc (120 cu in)	140 PS (103 kW; 138 hp) @ 4000	320 N⋅m (236 lb⋅ft) @ 1800-2500	2005-2008	209
2.0 TDI	BKP	EA188	I4 DOHC 16V turbo with piezoelectric PD injectors	1,968 cc (120 cu in)	140 PS (103 kW; 138 hp) @ 4000	320 N⋅m (236 lb⋅ft) @ 1750-2500	2005–2008	209
2.0 TDI	BMR		I4 DOHC 16V turbo with piezoelectric PD injectors and DPF	1,968 cc (120 cu in)	170 PS (125 kW; 168 hp) @ 4200	350 N⋅m (258 lb⋅ft) @ 1800-2500	2005–2008	223
2.0 TDI	CBAB	EA189	I4 DOHC 16V turbo with piezoelectric common rail injection and DPF	1,968 cc (120 cu in)	140 PS (103 kW; 138 hp) @ 4200	320 N⋅m (236 lb⋅ft) @ 1750-2500	2008-2010	209
2.0 TDI	CBBA/CBBB	EA189	I4 DOHC 16V turbo with piezoelectric common rail injection and DPF	1,968 cc (120 cu in)	170 PS (125 kW; 168 hp) @ 4200	350 N⋅m (258 lb⋅ft) @ 1750-2500	2008-2010	223
2.0 BlueTDI	CBAC	EA189	I4 DOHC 16V turbo with piezoelectric common rail injection and DPF	1,968 cc (120 cu in)	143 PS (105 kW; 141 hp) @ 4200	320 N⋅m (236 lb⋅ft) @ 1750-2500	2009-2010	210

In February 2008, the 2.0 FSI was replaced with the new Audi-developed 1.8 TSI engine and 6-speed automatic transmission. The 1.8 TSI is rated at 160 PS (118 kW; 158 hp), 250 N⋅m (184 lbf⋅ft) and reaches 0–100 km/h (62 mph) in 8.6 seconds, reaching a top speed of 220 km/h (136.7 mph). This engine is part of the wider Volkswagen Group policy for engine sharing.

As at August 2008, the cars were advertised in the UK as Euro 4 emission class. By July 2009, this had changed to Euro 5 class. This coincides with the introduction of the EA189 engine family at the centre of the VW emissions violation situation that became public in September 2015.

B7 petrol engines
Model	Engine Code	Engine Type	Displacement	Power@rpm	Torque@rpm	Years	Top speed (km/h)
1.4 TSI		I4 DOHC 16V FSI turbo	1,390 cc (85 cu in)	122 PS (90 kW; 120 hp) @ 5000	200 N⋅m (148 lb⋅ft) @ 1500-4000	2010-2015	203
1.8 TSI		I4 DOHC 16V FSI turbo	1,798 cc (110 cu in)	160 PS (118 kW; 158 hp) @ 5000-6200	250 N⋅m (184 lb⋅ft) @ 1500-4200	2010-2015	220
2.0 TSI		I4 DOHC 16V FSI turbo	1,984 cc (121 cu in)	210 PS (154 kW; 207 hp) @ 5300-6200	280 N⋅m (207 lb⋅ft) @ 1700-5200	2010-2015	238
3.6 V6 4MOTION		VR6 DOHC 24V FSI	3,597 cc (220 cu in)	300 PS (221 kW; 296 hp) @ 6600	350 N⋅m (258 lb⋅ft) @ 2400-5300	2010-2015	250
B7 petrol/natural gas engines
Model	Engine Code	Engine Type	Displacement	Power@rpm	Torque@rpm	Years	Top speed (km/h)
1.4 TSI EcoFuel		I4 DOHC 16V FSI twincharger	1,390 cc (85 cu in)	150 PS (110 kW; 148 hp) @ 5500	220 N⋅m (162 lb⋅ft) @ 1500-4500	2010-2015	214

B7 diesel engines
Model	Engine Code	Engine Type	Displacement	Power@rpm	Torque@rpm	Years	Top speed (km/h)
1.6 TDI	CAYC	I4 DOHC common rail turbo with DPF	1,598 cc (98 cu in)	105 PS (77 kW; 104 hp) @ 4400	250 N⋅m (184 lb⋅ft) @ 1500-2500	2011-	193
2.0 TDI	CBAB	I4 DOHC common rail turbo with DPF	1,968 cc (120 cu in)	140 PS (103 kW; 138 hp) @ 4200	320 N⋅m (236 lb⋅ft) @ 1750-2500	2011-	210
2.0 TDI	CLLA, CFGB	I4 DOHC common rail turbo with DPF	1,968 cc (120 cu in)	170 PS (125 kW; 168 hp) @ 4200	350 N⋅m (258 lb⋅ft) @ 1750-2500	2011-	224
2.0 TDI	CFGC	I4 DOHC common rail turbo with DPF	1,968 cc (120 cu in)	177 PS (130 kW; 175 hp) @ 4000	380 N⋅m (280 lb⋅ft) @ 1750-2500	2014-	224
2.0 BlueTDI	CFF/CFFB	I4 DOHC common rail turbo with DPF and SCR	1,968 cc (120 cu in)	140 PS (103 kW; 138 hp) @ 4200	320 N⋅m (236 lb⋅ft) @ 1750-2500	2011-	210

The Passat B7 range features several petrol and diesel engines, all to Euro 5 standards. All diesel engines feature BlueMotion Technology and Diesel Particulate Filter as standard. The BlueTDI engine is fitted with a Selective Catalytic Reduction system which makes it ready for Euro 6 standards.

=== Passat Estate TSI EcoFuel concept (2008) ===
It is a concept vehicle capable of using natural gas or conventional petrol fuel. It includes a 1.4-litre TSI 150 PS engine featuring both a supercharger and a turbocharger operating sequentially, 22 kg capacity natural gas tank mounted beneath the boot floor and 31-litre petrol tank.

The vehicle was unveiled in the 2008 Geneva Motor Show.

Production version went on sale at the end of 2008 in mainland Europe, for saloon and estate versions of the Passat.

== Safety ==
ANCAP test results* Volkswagen Passat diesel sedan and wagon (2008)
Test	Score
Overall	5 /5 stars
Frontal offset	13.99/16
Side impact	16/16
Pole	2/2
Seat belt reminders	2/3
Whiplash protection	Not Assessed
Pedestrian protection	Marginal
Electronic stability control	Standard

ANCAP test results* Volkswagen Passat CC diesel (2009)
Test	Score
Overall	5 /5 stars
Frontal offset	13.99/16
Side impact	16/16
Pole	2/2
Seat belt reminders	2/3
Whiplash protection	Not Assessed
Pedestrian protection	Marginal
Electronic stability control	Standard

== Awards ==
The Passat Estate won the overall winner of Practical Caravans Towcar of the Year Awards 2008 for its array of towing features such as its Trailer Stability Programme. A diesel Passat set a record distance of 1,626.1 miles (2,617 kilometres) on one tank of fuel in 2012.
