= D. maritima =

D. maritima may refer to:

- Dalbergia maritima, a legume species found only in Madagascar
- Drimia maritima, Sea Squill, a bulbous plant also known as Urginea maritima

== See also ==
- Maritima (disambiguation)
