= List of banks in Angola =

This is a list of commercial banks in Angola, as updated in 2024 by the Angolan Banking Association (ABANC).

== List of commercial banks ==
- Banco Angolano de Investimentos S.A. (BAI)
- Banco Caixa Geral Angola, S.A., part of CGD Group
- Banco de Comércio e Indústria S.A. (BCI), state-owned
- Banco da China Limitada - Sucursal em Luanda, S.A., part of Bank of China Group
- Banco Económico S.A.
- Banco de Negócios Internacional S.A. (BancoBNI)
- Banco BIC S.A.
- Banco Comercial Angolano S.A. (BCA)
- Banco Comercial do Huambo S.A.
- Banco de Desenvolvimento de Angola S.A. (BDA), state-owned
- Banco de Fomento Angola S.A. (BFA), part of CaixaBank Group
- Banco de Investimento Rural, S.A. (BIR)
- Banco de Poupança e Crédito S.A. (BPC), state-owned
- Banco Millenium Atlântico S.A., minority-owned by Banco Comercial Português
- Banco Keve S.A.
- Banco Valor S.A.
- Access Bank, part of Access Bank Group
- Banco Sol S.A.
- Standard Chartered S.A., part of Standard Chartered Group
- Banco VTB África, S.A., part of VTB Group
- Banco de Crédito do Sul, S.A. (BCS)
- Banco Yetu, S.A.
- Standard Bank de Angola S.A., part of Standard Bank Group

== See also ==
- List of Angolan companies
- List of banks in Africa
- List of insurance companies in Africa
