= Banco de Comércio e Indústria =

Bank of Angola

- Industry: Banking
- Founded: 11 July 1991; 34 years ago in Angola
- Founder: Government of Angola
- Headquarters: Luanda, Angola
- Key people: Filomeno Costa Alegre Alves de Ceita (CEO)
- Owners: Government of Angola (primary)
- Website: www.bci.ao

Banco de Comércio e Indústria is a bank in Angola. The bank was created on 11 July 1991 by government decree No. 08-A/91. The CEO is Filomeno Costa Alegre Alves de Ceita.

The primary shareholder is the government with 91% of the shares. Other shareholders are nine public enterprises, Angola Telecom, ENSA - Seguros de Angola, CERVAL, Sonangol, Endiama, TCUL, Porto de Luanda and TAAG with 1.1% of the shares each, and Bolama with 0.2%.

== See also ==
- List of banks in Angola
