= Air Express Algeria =

Algerian airline serving the oil and gas industry

| IATA | ICAO | Call sign |
|---|---|---|
| — | AEA | AIR EXPRESS |
- Founded: 2002
- Operating bases: Oued Irara–Krim Belkacem Airport
- Fleet size: 14
- Headquarters: Dar El Beïda, Algiers, Algeria
- Key people: Chakib Belleili (CEO)
- Website: http://www.airexpressdz.com

Air Express Algeria is an Algerian charter airline that mostly serves the oil and gas industries. The airline is based in Hassi Messaoud.

Air Express Algeria was founded in 2002. The services they provide include personnel transportation, medical evacuation, VIP transport, and light cargo transport. Algeria Air Express operates to international standards defined by OGP (Association of Oil and Gas Producers) as well as ICAO regulations.

In June 2026, the airline was banned from the EU due to "serious safety concerns", according to a report from the European Commission.

== Fleet ==
Air Express Algeria operates nine Beechcraft 1900D, and six Let L-410 Turbolet aircraft. The airline's total fleet consists of 15 aircraft as of 2025.
