= Banco de Desenvolvimento de Angola =

Angolan bank

- Type: Publicly owned
- Industry: Banking
- Founded: July 2006; 20 years ago
- Founder: Government of Angola
- Website: www.bda.ao

Banco de Desenvolvimento de Angola (English: Development Bank of Angola) (BDA) is the public bank of Angola to finance investments in "strategic long-term economic development" of the country. It was created July 2006 by government decree No. 37/06.

The BDA administers the Fundo Nacional de Desenvolvimento - FND (National Development Fund - NDF) which is supplied by 5% of the fiscal results of the petroleum industry of Angola and 2% of the fiscal results of the diamond activities of Angola.

In 2008, the bank financed projects worth 8.7 billion Kwanzas, corresponding to about $US 116 million.

== See also ==
- List of banks in Angola

== External links and sources ==
- Banco de Desenvolvimento de Angola
