= Banco Angolano de Investimentos =

Bank of Angola

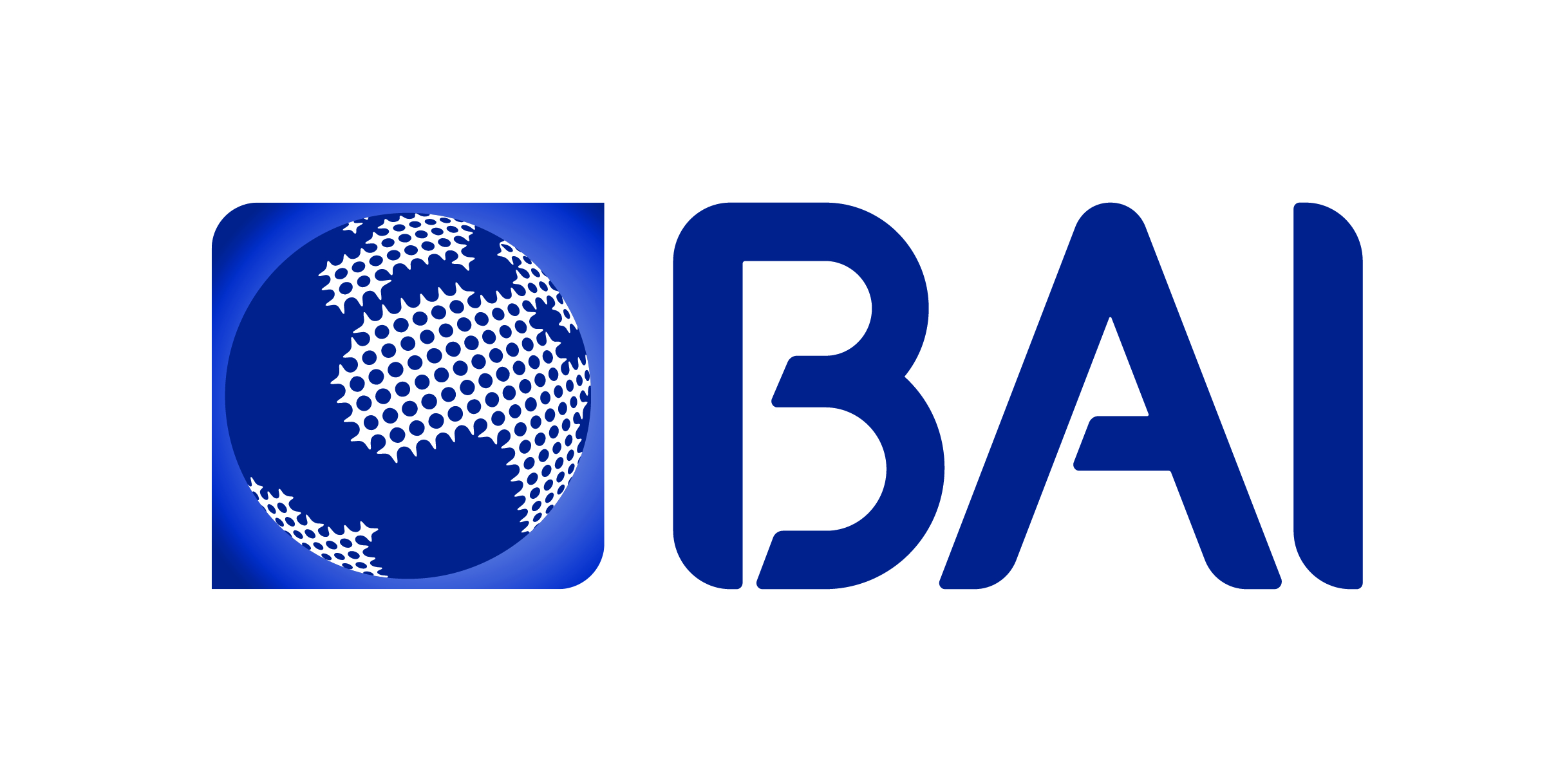
- Type: Common stock company (S.A.)
- Industry: Finance
- Founded: November 13, 1996; 29 years ago
- Headquarters: Luanda, Angola
- Key people: Pedro António Filipe
- Products: Financial services
- Website: www.bancobai.ao

Banco Angolano de Investimentos or BAI (formerly Banco Africano de Investimentos) was the first private bank in Angola, founded in 1996. BAI is a full-service bank operating in Angola with a nationwide network of 89 branches in all 18 provinces as of 2012, with 41 of those branches in Luanda Province. In 9 of the 18 provinces, BAI operates only one branch office.

The largest shareholder is Sonangol, with 8.5% of the bank's capital. Arcinella Assets and Sforza Properties hold 7% respective 6.5% of the shares, six others hold 5% each; the remaining 48% are spread in smaller allotments.

The BAI has one representation in Portugal, the Banco BAI Europa S.A. with two branches, Lisbon and Porto. In 2008 BAI opened the Banco BAI Cabo Verde in Cape Verde with several branches. During the last year, BAI bought the Banco BAI Microfinanças (BMF), a small bank in Angola that offers several services including Western Union payment transfers.

BAI is also a shareholder in the Banco Sul Atlantico (BSA), IFI in Cape Verde, Brasil Banco Múltiplo in Brazil, Banco Internacional de S. Tomé e Príncipe (BISTP) in São Tomé and Principe, and other companies.

== See also ==
- List of banks in Angola
