= List of airlines banned in the European Union =

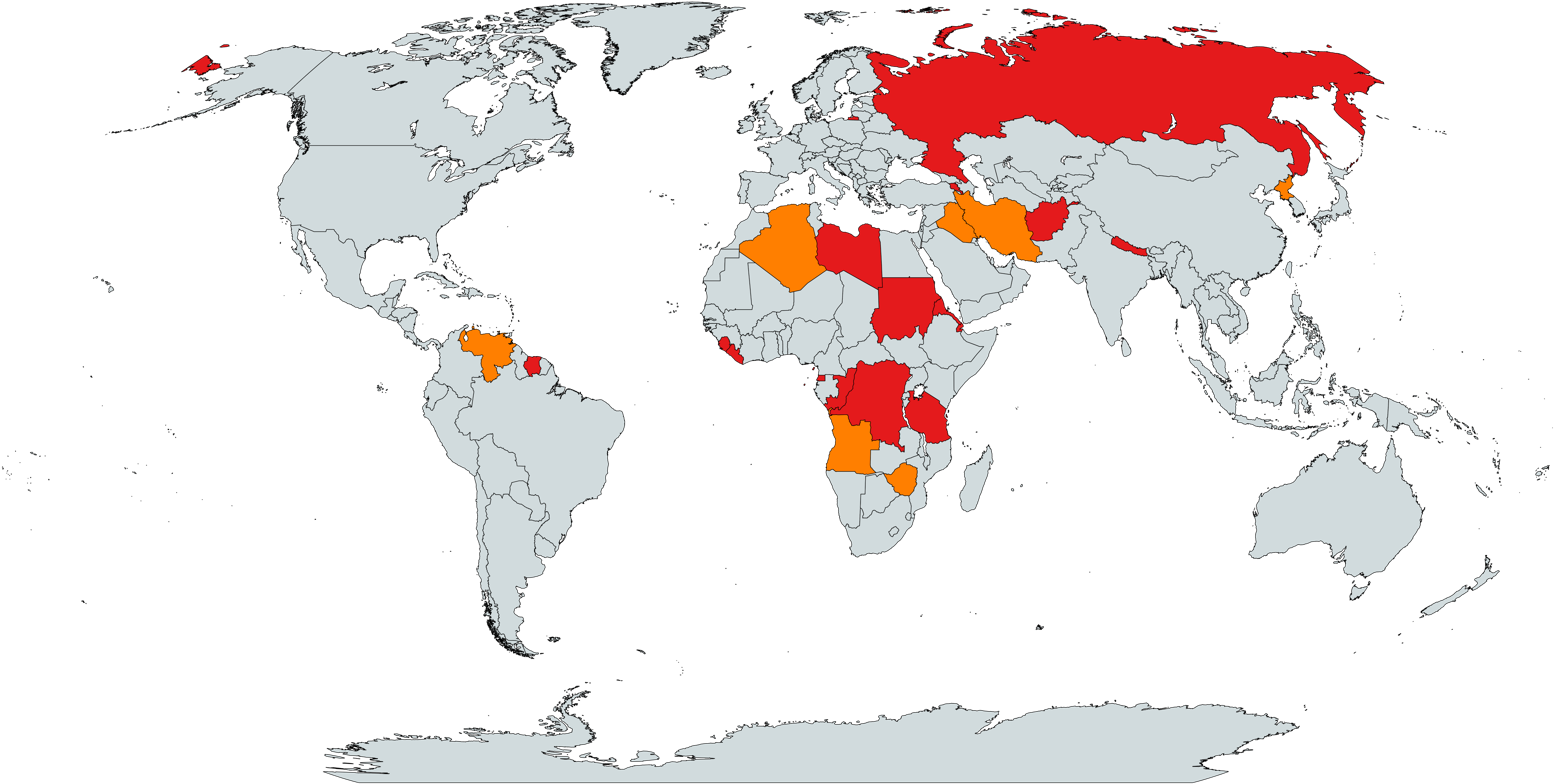
Accurate as of 10 June 2026: all airlines banned some airlines banned no airlines banned and still allowed to fly in the airspace

The European Union (EU) publishes a list of air carriers that are banned from entering the airspace of any of its member states, usually for failing to meet EU regulatory oversight standards. The first version of the list was published in 2006, on the legal basis of Regulation No. 474/2006 of the European Commission, issued on 22 March of that year. The current version of the list was published on 9 June 2026.

== Legal procedure ==
The process by which an air carrier is listed is laid out in Regulation (EC) No 2111/2005 of the European Parliament and Council. It involves consultation among the regulatory agencies of the member states, the institutions of the European Community, the authorities with responsibility for regulatory oversight of the air carrier concerned, and the air carrier itself. Before being listed, each air carrier has the right of appeal. The list is subject to periodic review.

In June 2016, all restrictions on Air Madagascar, Iran Air, Lion Air, Citilink, Batik Air, and all Zambian airlines were removed from the list of air carriers banned in the EU.

On 30 November 2017, Avior Airlines from Venezuela was added to the list because of "unaddressed safety deficiencies." No further details were given at the time.

On 14 June 2018, all remaining Indonesian airlines not already removed from the list were removed from the list of air carriers banned in the EU.

On 3 February 2019, Turkmenistan Airlines was banned from European Union airspace, "pending confirmation that it meets international air safety standards", but the ban was lifted on 16 October 2019.

On 8 December 2019, Gabon's airlines were removed from the list, while the Armenian Civil Aviation Committee was "put under heightened scrutiny because of signs of a decrease in safety oversight", and a new update to the list was published on the next day.

As of January 2020, Syria's airlines are not specifically mentioned on the list, but in practice there is a ban against them in the context of the general EU sanctions against Syria.

On 30 June 2020, EASA suspended Pakistan International Airlines authorisation to operate to the EU member states for a period of six months to Europe after the crash of flight PK8303 and subsequent PIA Pilot License scandal. In late 2020 and early 2021, the ban was extended by another three months and later indefinitely. In mid 2023, PIA reportedly passed an initial online EASA Safety Audit with in-person visit by EASA team scheduled for late November 2023. As of 30 November 2023, PIA does not figure on the EU Air Safety List. On 29 November 2024, the EASA lifted the EU ban, confirming that PIA had passed its safety audit and that the PCAA had established sufficient oversight over PIA.

In response to the government of Belarus forcing Ryanair Flight 4978 to divert and land in Minsk to arrest dissident Roman Protasevich, EU leaders announced that they would ban Belarusian carriers from using EU airspace and vice versa on 24 May 2021. Although the EU air safety list has since not included Belarusian airlines on its list of those banned from flying into EU airspace, the ban remains in place as part of EU sanctions against Belarus, which are more politically motivated than aviation safety-related.

In response to the 2022 Russian invasion of Ukraine, the President of the European Commission, Ursula von der Leyen announced that Russian owned, Russian registered or Russian controlled aircraft would not be permitted to take-off, land, or overfly EU airspace. And while some member states passed legislations under such terms, only selected carriers that violated Certificate of Airworthiness procedures and the Chicago Convention were banned by the EASA. This also resulted in Airbus, Boeing, and Embraer no longer supporting Russian-based aircraft.

On 3 June 2025, all Surinamese and Tanzanian air carriers were banned from EU airspace due to not meeting international aviation standards.

On 8 June 2026, all Kyrgyzstan air carriers were permitted to fly in EU airspace for the first time since the blacklist was created. The decision was credited with the nation's work in bringing their airlines up to ICAO international standards over the past twenty years. In the same update Air Express Algeria was added to the blacklist after "serious safety concerns" were reported, being the only Algerian airline on the list.

== List of air carriers ==
=== Banned airlines by country ===
Banned air carriers could be permitted to exercise traffic rights by using wet-leased aircraft of an air carrier which is not subject to an operating ban, provided that the relevant safety standards are complied with. The list includes the following airlines, with the airline license having been issued in the respective countries:

Country	Banned airlines	Notes
Afghanistan	All	Banned in 2010 for lacking a viable aviation safety regime.
Algeria	Air Express Algeria	Specific airline banned in 2026 for "serious safety concerns"
Angola	All with the exception of TAAG Angola Airlines and Heli Malongo Airways	
Armenia	All	FlyOne Armenia operates flights to and from nine EU countries using wetleased craft.
Democratic Republic of the Congo	All	
Republic of the Congo	All	
Djibouti	All	
Equatorial Guinea	All	CEIBA Intercontinental operates flights to Madrid via a wetlease.
Eritrea	All	
Iran	Iran Aseman Airlines	Iran Air's Fokker 100s are subject to restrictions under Annex B.
Iraq	Fly Baghdad, Iraqi Airways	
Liberia	All	Currently, there are no actively operating airlines in Liberia.
Libya	All	
Nepal	All	Single authority for aviation regulation and operation creates conflict of interest.
Russia	All	Since the 2022 Russian invasion of Ukraine.
São Tomé and Príncipe	All	STP Airways operates flights to Lisbon via a wetlease with EuroAtlantic Airways.
Sierra Leone	All	
Sudan	All	
Suriname	All	
Tanzania	All	
Venezuela	Avior Airlines	
Zimbabwe	Air Zimbabwe	

=== Annex B ===
Annex B of the EU list covers airlines which are restricted to operating only certain aircraft within the EU.

Country of operator	Restricted airlines	Aircraft permitted	Country of aircraft registry
Iran	Iran Air	All except all Fokker 100 and Boeing 747 aircraft currently on its AOC	Iran
North Korea	Air Koryo	Two Tupolev Tu-204 aircraft registered as P-632 and P-633	North Korea

== See also ==
- EUROCONTROL
- European Aviation Safety Agency
- Joint Aviation Authorities
