= Air 26 =

Airline of Angola

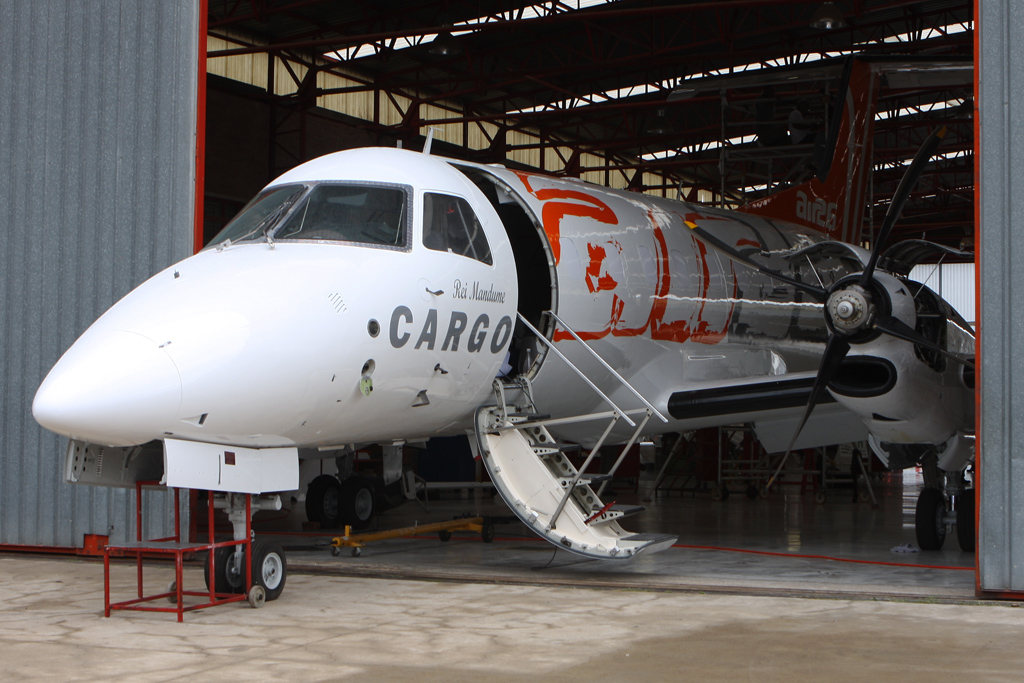
- An Air 26 Embraer EMB 120 Brasilia in a hangar at Lanseria International Airport (2009).
IATA	ICAO	Call sign
-	DCD	DUCARD
- Founded: 2006
- Ceased operations: 2011
- Hubs: Quatro de Fevereiro Airport
- Fleet size: 30
- Destinations: 26
- Headquarters: Luanda, Angola
- Website: www.air26.co.ao (defunct)

Air26 - Linhas Aéreas, S.A. was an airline based in Luanda, Angola. Founded in 2006, it operates domestic passenger and cargo flights out of the city's Quatro de Fevereiro Airport. Along with all other Angolan airlines except for TAAG, Air 26 is banned from operating within the European Union. In 2010, the company had its licence revoked, but it was re-issued on 31 January 2011. The airline was unable to fully re-start by the end of the year, however.

== Fleet ==
The Air 26 fleet consisted of the following aircraft (as of August 2019):

Air 26 fleet
Aircraft	In service
Embraer EMB 120RT Brasilia	2
Embraer ERJ 135LR	2
Embraer ERJ 145EP	1
Total	5

=== Former fleet ===
The airline previously operated the following aircraft:

- 1 further Embraer EMB 120
