= Diexim Expresso =

Airline of Angola

IATA	ICAO	Call sign
-	-	DIEXIM
- Founded: 2003
- Ceased operations: 2008
- Operating bases: Quatro de Fevereiro Airport
- Fleet size: 6
- Destinations: 5
- Parent company: Grupo Bartolomeu Dias (BD)
- Headquarters: Luanda, Angola

Diexim Expresso Aviaçao (operating as Diexim Expresso) was an airline based in Luanda, Angola. It operated scheduled services linking the main towns and cities in Angola, as well as VIP flights and charter services within Angola and to Namibia. Its main base was Quatro de Fevereiro Airport, Luanda. The airline was on the list of air carriers banned in the EU.

== History ==
The airline was established in 2003 and was wholly owned by Grupo BD-Bartolomeu Dias. On 14 November 2008, Diexim Expresso was added to the list of air carriers banned in the EU due to safety concerns. Meanwhile, the airline ceased operations.

== Destinations ==
Diexim Expresso served the following destinations as of November 2009:

^{[Base]}	Base

City	Country	IATA	ICAO	Airport
Benguela	Angola	BUG	FNBG	Benguela Airport
Huambo	Angola	NOV	FNHU	Nova Lisboa Airport
Luanda	Angola	LAD	FNLU	Quatro de Fevereiro Airport ^{[Base]}
Lubango	Angola	SDD	FNUB	Lubango Airport
Soyo	Angola	SZA	FNSO	Soyo Airport

== Fleet ==
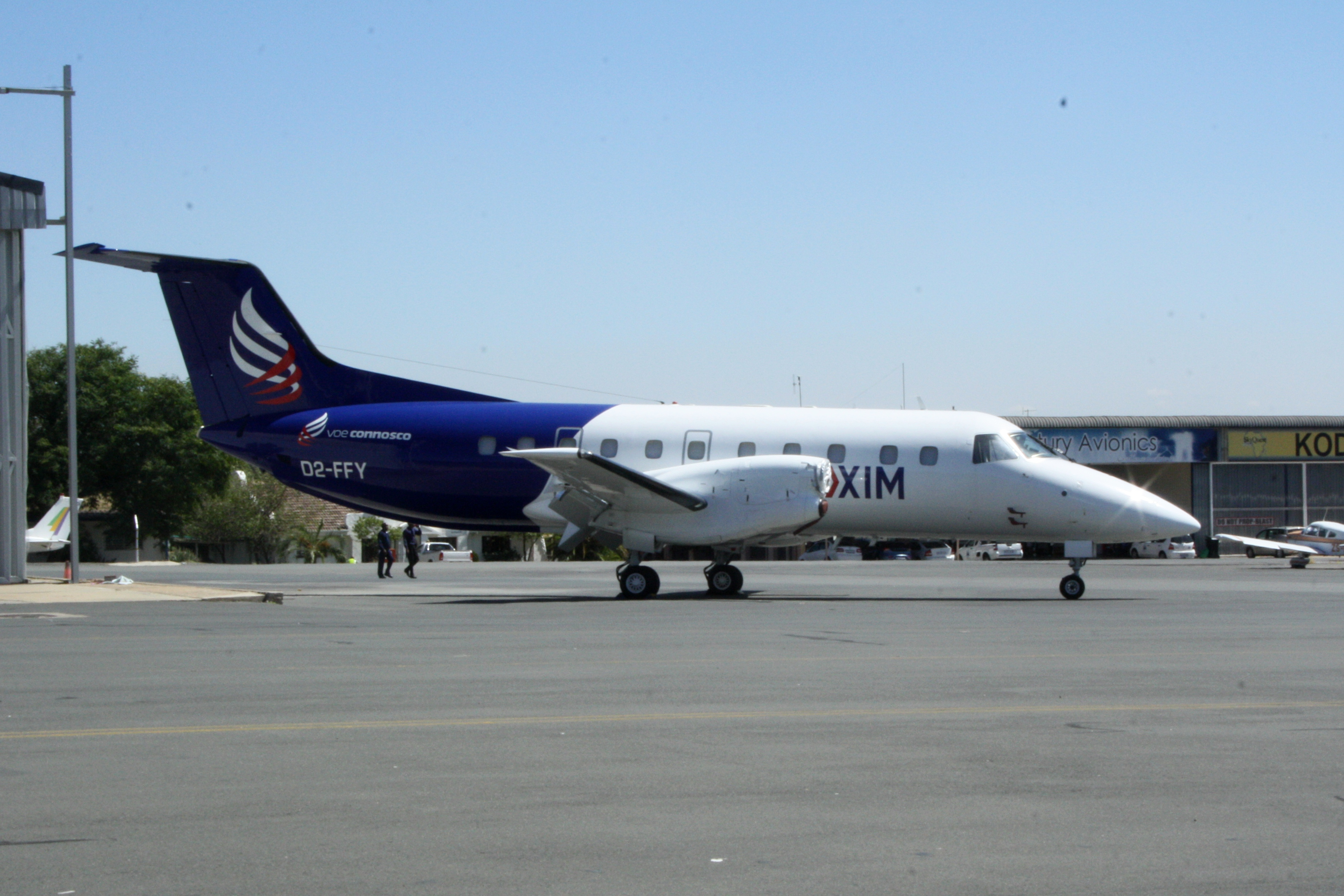
Diexim Expresso EMB 120 Brasilia

The Diexim Expresso fleet included the following aircraft as of April 2012:

Diexim Expresso fleet
Aircraft	In Fleet	Notes
Embraer EMB 120 Brasilia	5	2 stored at HLA; 1 stored at LOS
Embraer ERJ 145	1	Stored at HLA
Total	6	
