= Maritima =

Maritima may refer to:

- 912 Maritima, an asteroid
- maritima, a Latin word commonly used in systematic names

== See also ==
- , including:
  - Diocese of Alba Maritima, a Catholic titular see
  - Caesarea Maritima, an ancient and medieval port city on the coast of the eastern Mediterranean
  - CD Orientación Marítima, a football team in Arrecife, Canary Islands
  - Cupra Marittima, a town on the Adriatic coast
  - Ora maritima ('The Sea Coasts'), a poem by Avienius
  - Secil Maritima, an Angolan shipping company
  - Sea beet, Beta vulgaris subsp. maritima
- Maritime (disambiguation)
- Maritimus (disambiguation)
- Maritimum (disambiguation)
