= Secil Maritima =

Secil Marítima is an Angolan shipping company which operates the terminals at Lobito, Luanda and Moçâmedes ports. The company has increased its shipping activities since the signing of the country's peace treaty in 2002, and is now a leader in freight forwarding.

The company specializes in providing maritime transport for goods and passengers up and down the Angolan coast, and is responsible for the transportation of all the goods imported by the state.

Secil Marítima acquired Legend Virgo for cargo transport in 2024 to strengthen cargo transport capacity.
