= Ancar =

Defunct car assembly company in Angola

- Founded: 2001
- Founders: Helmuth Schuster; John Johannsen
- Defunct: c. 2005
- Headquarters: Angola
- Parent: Volkswagen Group

Ancar (Ancar Automóveis de Angola, SA) was a private company in Angola founded in 2001 to create a joint venture with Škoda Auto and to establish a car assembly line in Angola. Ancar was regarded as the front company of Ancar World Wide Investments Holding, a company with dubious financial European capital, that was registered in the USA. Ancar Angola no longer exists and the project was ceased in both Angola and Germany. There were serious corruption allegations against company executives.

== History ==
The initiators of the project were former Škoda Auto board member Helmuth Schuster and John Johannsen. At this time, the Spanish police had an arrest warrant out on Johannsen for serial cheating. Due to Schuster and Johannsen's dubious business practices, Norddeutscher Rundfunk in Germany broadcast a report about the Volkswagen corruption scandal on July 14, 2005. According to this news, Volkswagen Group responded to allegations by dismissing one board member and stopping construction of a factory 24 kilometres (15 mi) outside of Luanda. Volkswagen only continued further negotiations with Ancar until an extensive review of the company took place and then suspended the project.

On June 28, 2008, however, Volkswagen announced in a press release their decision to continue construction works and to open the assembly factory in 2009. An investment of 15 million U.S. dollars, including the establishment of a nationwide dealer network, was planned too. According to the original plans that were in effect in the years 2001 to 2005, this factory would have been just an assembly operation, where cars disassembled in Lisbon, Portugal would be reassembled in Angola. This method would have promised high profit gains to the operators. Due to this procedure, new jobs for the local people could have been created, which was supported by Angolan law.

Due to complications that led up to the highest government circles, including a daughter of President José Eduardo dos Santos participating in Ancar, the Government of Angola made it publicly clear to distance itself from the case. Instead, on the designated factory site, a joint venture between the Polo Industrial de Viana, Viana, and the China International Fund called CSG - Automóvel fabricado em Angola was established. (as of 2011).
