= SonAir =

Airline of Angola

IATA	ICAO	Call sign
-	SOR	SONAIR
- Founded: 10 October 1979
- Hubs: Quatro de Fevereiro Airport
- Fleet size: 12
- Destinations: 4
- Parent company: Sonangol Group
- Headquarters: Luanda, Angola
- Key people: Sebastiao Gaspar Martins (Chairman); Alfredo Manuel Varo Kaputu (Chief Executive Officer)
- Website: www.sonair.co.ao

SonAir Airline Services, S.A. (Portuguese: SonAir Serviço Aéreo, S.A.), commonly known as SonAir was established as DAR (Direcção de Aeronaútica) on 10 October 1979, is a venture of the Angolan national petroleum company Sonangol Group.

== Operations ==
It provides helicopter services to Angolan oil facilities, both onshore and offshore, as well as scheduled and charter services within Africa and to the United States.

Domestically they also provide air transportation to several business groups - private and government, outside the oil business. The company was also the first to provide direct transportation of passengers and cargo between Angola and the United States. Until 2018, the airline provided thrice-weekly services between Luanda (LAD) and Houston (IAH) utilizing a Boeing 747-400 (10 First Class, 143 Business Class, some of which were marketed as a Premium Economy with a lesser amenity service, and 36 Economy Class seats) operated by Atlas Air. In Angola, SonAir is once again investing in its fleet after several years of impasse over the company's future. In a first phase, the Sonangol subsidiary was included in the privatization program announced in 2019, while several strategic changes and a program to refound the largest company in the country were introduced. This caused some internal ripples because Sonangol's Board of Directors argued that supporting the oil industry is a profitable business.

These decisions also led to the separation of the functions of concessionaire (which are now under the responsibility of ANPG - National Oil and Gas Agency) and operator. It was also established that Sonangol would focus mainly on its core business (research, production and distribution of oil and derivatives). In this context, the market for the provision of air transport services to the oil industry was liberalized, putting an end to the monopoly, which led to the entry of new players in this segment. After avoiding the closure of the company, Sonair is now looking to reinforce its operations in a context of greater internal competition.

== Destinations ==
As of May 2018 SonAir operated scheduled flights to the following destinations:

Angola

- Cabinda (Cabinda Airport)
- Catumbela (Catumbela Airport)
- Luanda (Quatro de Fevereiro Airport), hub
- Soyo (Soyo Airport)

== Fleet ==
As of August 2025, Sonair operates the following aircraft:

- 12 Beechcraft 1900D

=== Former fleet ===
Fixed wing

- 1 Airbus A319
- 13 Beechcraft 1900
- 1 Boeing 727-100F
- 2 Boeing 737-700
- 2 Boeing 747-400 (operated by Atlas Air)
- 2 Embraer Legacy 600 (operated by Planair)
- 1 Dassault Falcon 7X (operated by Planair)
- 2 Dassault Falcon 900 (operated by Planair)

Helicopters:

- 8 Eurocopter AS332 Super Puma
- 5 Eurocopter Dauphin AS 365N3
- 16 Eurocopter EC225
- 9 Sikorsky S-76C+ and S-76C++

The fleet included the following aircraft (as of August 2019):

- 2 Boeing 737-700
- 5 de Havilland Canada DHC-6-300 Twin Otter

The airline previously operated the following aircraft:

- 4 further De Havilland Canada DHC-6 Twin Otter

== See also ==
- Gazpromavia, an airline based in Moscow, Russia that operates passenger and cargo charters, mainly in support of the oil and gas industry
