= Alada =

Airline of Angola

IATA	ICAO	Call sign
-	RAD	AIR ALADA
- Founded: 1995
- Ceased operations: 2010
- Hubs: Quatro de Fevereiro Airport
- Fleet size: 9
- Headquarters: Luanda, Angola

Alada Empresa de Transportes Aéreos was an airline based in Luanda, Angola. Established in 1995, it operated chartered passenger and cargo flights out of Quatro de Fevereiro Airport, Luanda. Their AOC was revoked in 2010.

== Fleet ==
As of June 2011, the Alada fleet included the following aircraft:

- 1 Antonov An-12
- 2 Antonov An-32
- 2 Ilyushin Il-18
