= Heli Malongo Airways =

Airline of Angola

- Founded: 2005
- Operating bases: Quatro de Fevereiro Airport, Cabinda Airport and Kwanda Base (Soyo)
- Fleet size: 2
- Headquarters: Luanda, Angola
- Website: www.helimalongo.com

Heli Malongo Aviação e Serviços de Angola, Lda is an air charter operator headquartered in Luanda, Angola, which offers onshore and offshore flights in support of the oil industry in Angola from its base at Cabinda Airport.

== Profile ==
At the 2008 Farnborough Air Show, Heli Malongo signed a deal with the Sikorsky Aircraft Corporation for the supply of three Sikorsky S-76C++. This marked the first time Heli Malongo had ordered Sikorsky helicopters. The airline made the purchase in order to set up Angola's first search and rescue service, allowing the company to further support the burgeoning oil industry in Angola. The three helicopters were delivered to Heli Malongo at a ceremony in Coatesville, Pennsylvania on 20 January 2011.

== Fleet ==
As of August 2025, Heli Malongo operates the following aircraft:

Heli Malongo Airways fleet
Aircraft	In service	Passengers
Bombardier Dash 8 Q-400	2	Y72
Total	2	
