= Angola Air Charter =

Cargo Charter Airline of Angola

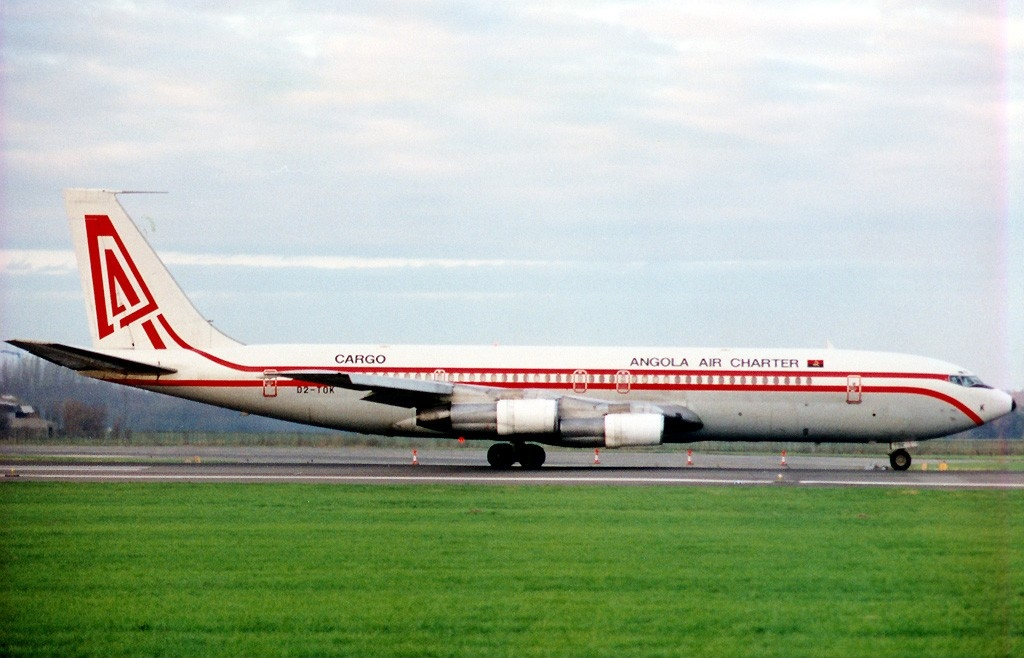
- Angola Air Charter Boeing 707, 1995
IATA	ICAO	Call sign
-	AGO	ANGOLA CHARTER
- Founded: 1987
- Hubs: Quatro de Fevereiro Airport
- Fleet size: 1
- Parent company: TAAG Angola Airlines (100%)
- Headquarters: Luanda, Angola
- Website: https://www.africanaircharter.com/air-charter-in-angola

Angola Air Charter is a charter airline based in Luanda, Angola. It operates cargo charters in Africa. Its main base is Quatro de Fevereiro Airport, Luanda. It is banned in the EU airspace as well as most other Angolan airlines.

== History ==
The airline was established in 1987 and is wholly owned by TAAG Angola Airlines.

== Fleet ==
The Angola Air Charter fleet consists of the following aircraft:

- 1 Embraer EMB-120RT Brasilia

=== Previously operated ===
Angola Air Charter has also operated:

- 7 Boeing 707
  - 1 707-321C
  - 2 707-324C
  - 1 707-347C
  - 2 707-351C
  - 1 707-373C
- 13 Boeing 727
  - 2 727-21
  - 1 727-22C
  - 4 727-23F
  - 2 727-44
  - 1 727-51C
  - 1 727-77C
  - 1 727-82
  - 1 727-116C
- 1 Boeing 737-200
- 7 Lockheed Hercules
  - 2 L-100-20 Hercules
  - 6 L-100-30 Hercules
- 2 Antonov An-12
  - 1 AN-12
  - 1 AN-12BP
- 1 Embraer EMB-120RT Brasilia
- 1 Ilyushin IL-76

== Accidents and incidents ==
1980s

- D2-TOV
1990s

- D2-THV
- J6-SLQ
- D2-THC
- D2-TJB
- D2-TJC
2000s

- D2-FCK

Source: Angola Air Charter Crashes at the Bureau of Aircraft Accidents
