= Transporte Colectivo Urbano de Luanda =

Public transit company of Luanda, the capital of Angola

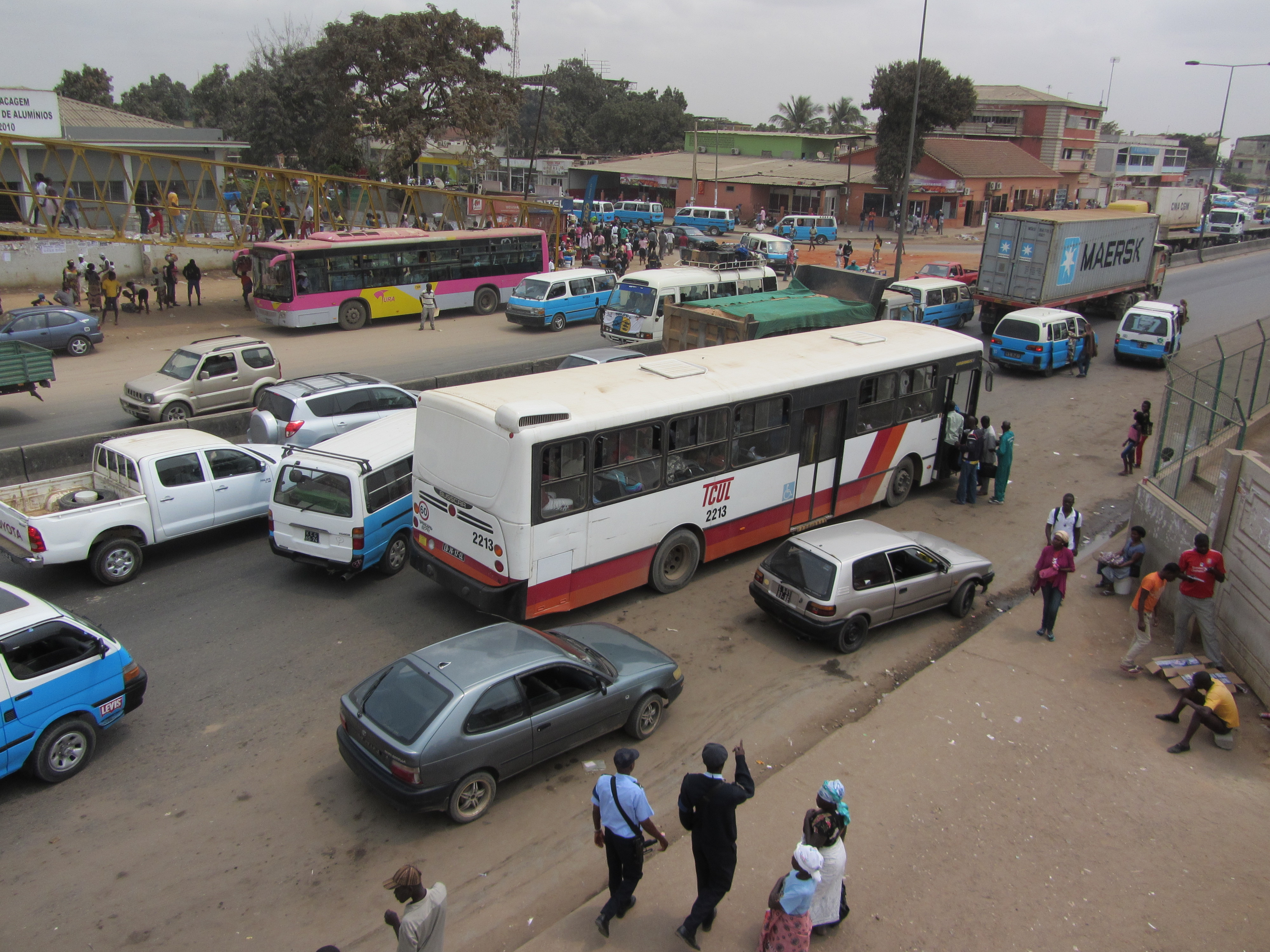
A TCUL bus in front of the Viana railway station, with also a TURA bus (private), Candongueiros, and private cars

Transporte Colectivo Urbano de Luanda, abbreviated as TCUL, is the public transit company of Luanda, Angola's capital. TCUL was founded on July 12, 1988. It is a public, i.e. state owned company, depending on the Transport ministry of the central government. Besides 40 bus lines within Luanda province, it also operates over-land bus lines from Luanda to Benguela, Sumbe, N'Dalatando, Malange, Uíge, and Huambo. TCUL disposes of about 300 buses, soon to be extended to 400. The CEO is currently Abel Cosme who took his role from 2017 to the present day.
