= List of airports in the Democratic Republic of the Congo =

This is a list of airports in the Democratic Republic of the Congo, sorted by location.

== Airports ==
Airport names shown in bold indicate the airport has scheduled service on commercial airlines.

City served	Province	ICAO	IATA	Airport name
**Public airports**				
Aba	Haut-Uélé	FZJF		Aba Airport
Abumumbazi	Nord-Ubangi	FZFE		Abumumbazi Airport
Aketi	Bas-Uélé	FZKN		Aketi Airport
Bandundu	Kwilu	FZBO	FDU	**Bandundu Airport**
Banga	Kasaï	FZCI		Banga Airport
Basankusu	Équateur	FZEN	BSU	Basankusu Airport
Basongo	Kasaï	FZVR	BAN	Basongo Airport
Beni	Nord-Kivu	FZNP	BNC	**Beni Airport**
Beni	Nord-Kivu	FZNS		Wageni Airport
Beni-Dibele	Sankuru	FZVO		Beni-Dibele Airport
Bibanga	Kasai-Oriental	FZWB		Bibanga Airport
Bindja	Mai-Ndombe	FZBQ		Bindja Airport
Binga	Mongala	FZGE		Binga Airport
Boende	Tshuapa	FZGN	BNB	**Boende Airport**
Bokela	Tshuapa	FZDR		Bokela Airport
Bokoro	Mai-Ndombe			Bokoro Airport
Bokote	Mai-Ndombe	FZBW		Basengele Airport
Bokungu	Tshuapa	FZGF		Bokungu Airport
Bolila	Tshopo	FZGC		Bolila Airport
Boma	Kongo Central	pending	pending	Boma International Airport
Boma	Kongo Central	FZAJ	BOA	Boma Airport
Bongimba	Mai-Ndombe	FZBB		Bongimba Airport
Bonkita	Mai-Ndombe	FZBF		Bonkita Airport
Bosondjo	Mongala	FZGB		Bosondjo Airport - closed
Bukavu	Sud-Kivu	FZMA	BKY	**Kavumu Airport**
Bukena	Haut-Lomami	FZRE		Bukena Airport
Bumba	Mongala	FZFU	BMB	**Bumba Airport**
Bunia	Ituri	FZKA	BUX	**Bunia Airport**
Busala	Kwilu	FZCR		Busala Airport
Buta	Bas-Uélé	FZKJ	BZU	Buta Zega Airport
Dekese	Kasaï	FZVT		Dekese Airport
Diboko	Kasaï	FZUP		Diboko Airport
Dikungu	Sankuru	FZVP		Dikungu Airport
Dilolo	Lualaba	FZSI		Dilolo Airport
Dingila	Bas-Uélé	FZKB		Bambili-Dingila Airport
Djokele	Mai-Ndombe	FZBL		Djokele Airport
Doko	Haut-Uélé	FZJB		Doko Airport
Doruma	Haut-Uélé	FZJD		Doruma Airport
Dungu-Uye	Haut-Uélé	FZJC		Dungu-Uye Airport
Engengele	Mongala	FZFC		Engengele Airport
Faradje	Haut-Uélé	FZJK		Faradje Airport
Fungurume	Lualaba	FZQF		Fungurume Airport
Gbadolite	Nord-Ubangi	FZFD	BDT	Gbadolite Airport
Gemena	Sud-Ubangi	FZFK	GMA	**Gemena Airport**
Goma	Nord-Kivu	FZNA	GOM	**Goma International Airport**
Goyongo	Nord-Ubangi	FZFJ		Goyongo Airport
Gwaka	Sud-Ubangi	FZFW		Gwaka Airport
Idiofa	Kwilu	FZCB	IDF	Idiofa Airport
Idumbe	Kasaï	FZVU		Idumbe Airport
Ikela	Tshuapa	FZGV	IKL	Ikela Airport
Ilebo	Kasaï	FZVS	PFR	Ilebo Airport
Inga	Kongo Central	FZAN		Inga Airport
Ingende	Équateur	FZEI		Ingende Airport
Inongo	Mai-Ndombe	FZBA	INO	Inongo Airport
Ipeke	Mai-Ndombe	FZBU		Ipeke Airport
Ishasha	Nord-Kivu	FZNI		Ishasha Airport
Isiro	Haut-Uélé	FZJH	IRP	**Matari Airport**
Isiro	Haut-Uélé	FZJA		Isiro-Ville Airport - closed
Kabalo	Tanganyika	FZRM	KBO	Kabalo Airport
Kabinda	Lomami	FZWT	KBN	Tunta Airport
Kabombo	Tanganyika	FZRD		Kabombo Airport - closed
Kahemba	Kwango	FZCF		Kahemba Airport
Kailo	Maniema	FZOO		Kailo Airport
Kulindji	Bandundu	FZCK		Kajiji Airport
Kala	Sud-Ubangi	FZFL		Kala Airport
Kalemie	Tanganyika	FZRF	FMI	**Kalemie Airport**
Kalima	Maniema	FZOD	KLY	Kinkungwa Airport
Kalima	Maniema	FZOC		Kamisuku Airport
Kamina	Haut-Lomami	FZSB	KMN	**Kamina Airport**
Kamituga	Sud-Kivu	FZPB		Kamituga Airport
Kampene	Maniema	FZOE		Kampene Airport
Kananga	Kasai-Central	FZUA	KGA	**Kananga Airport**
Kaniama	Haut-Lomami	FZTK	KNM	Kaniama Airport
Kansimba	Tanganyika	FZRK		Kansimba Airport
Kapanga	Lualaba	FZSK	KAP	Kapanga Airport
Karawa	Nord-Ubangi	FZFS		Karawa Airport
Kasaji	Lualaba	FZSJ		Kasaji Airport
Kasenga	Haut-Katanga	FZQG	KEC	Kasenga Airport
Kasese	Maniema	FZOS		Kasese Airport
Kasonga	Kasaï-Central	FZUF		Kasonga Airport - closed
Kasongo	Maniema	FZOK		Kasongo Airport
Kasongo Lunda	Kwango		KGN	Kasongo Lunda Airport
Katako'kombe	Sankuru	FZVG		Katako'kombe Airport
Katale	Nord-Kivu	FZNB		Katale Airport
Katwe	Haut-Katanga	FZQH		Katwe Airport
Kempa	Mai-Ndombe	FZBG		Kempa Airport - closed
Kempile	Mai-Ndombe	FZBV		Kempile Airport
Kenge	Kwango	FZCS		Kenge Airport
Kikongo	Kwilu	FZCW		Wamba Airport
Kikwit	Kwilu	FZCA	KKW	**Kikwit Airport**
Kindu	Maniema	FZOA	KND	**Kindu Airport**
Kinshasa	(capital city)	FZAA	FIH	**N'Djili International Airport** (Kinshasa Int'l)
Kinshasa	(capital city)	FZAB	NLO	**N'Dolo Airport**
Kipushi	Lomami	FZWF		Kipushi Airport
Kiri	Mai-Ndombe	FZBT	KRZ	Basango Mboliasa Airport
Kisangani	Tshopo	FZIC	FKI	**Bangoka International Airport**
Kisenge	Lualaba	FZQP		Kisenge Airport
Kole Sur Lukenie	Sankuru	FZVC		Kole Sur Lukenie Airport
Kolo Fuma	Kongo Central	FZAR	NKL	Nkolo-Fuma Airport
Kolwezi	Lualaba	FZQM	KWZ	**Kolwezi Airport**
Kongolo	Tanganyika	FZRQ	KOO	**Kongolo Airport**
Kwilu-Ngongo	Kongo Central	FZAW		Kwilu-Ngongo Airport
Libenge	Sud-Ubangi	FZFA	LIE	Libenge Airport
Lisaki	Haut-Katanga	FZQI		Kamatanda Airport - closed
Lisala	Mongala	FZGA	LIQ	**Lisala Airport**
Lodja	Sankuru	FZVA	LJA	**Lodja Airport**
Lokutu	Tshopo	FZIZ		Lokutu Airport
Lombo	Nord-Ubangi	FZFN		Lombo Airport - closed
Lomela	Sankuru	FZVE		Lomela Airport
Lubao	Lomami	FZWS		Lubao Airport
Lubero	Nord-Kivu	FZNF		Lubero Airport
Lubondaie	Kasaï-Central	FZUE		Lubondaie Airport
Lubudi	Lualaba	FZQU		Lubudi Airport
Lubumbashi	Haut-Katanga	FZQA	FBM	**Lubumbashi International Airport**
Luebo	Kasaï	FZUN		Luebo Airport
Luena	Haut-Lomami	FZTL		Luena Airport
Lugushwa	Sud-Kivu	FZPC		Lugushwa Airport
Luishi	Haut-Katanga	FZQW		Luishi Airport
Luiza	Kasaï-Central	FZUG	LZA	Luiza Airport
Lukala	Kongo Central	FZAP		Lukala Airport
Lulingu	Sud-Kivu	FZOG		Lulingu Tshionka Airport
Luniemu	Haut-Lomami	FZJN		Luniemu Airport
Lunkuni	Kwilu	FZCN		Lunkuni Airport
Luozi	Kongo Central	FZAL	LZI	Luozi Airport
Luputa	Lomami	FZWI		Kashia Airport
Lusambo	Sankuru	FZVI	LBO	Lusambo Airport
Lusanga	Kwilu	FZCE	LUS	Lusanga Airport - closed
Lusinga	Haut-Katanga	FZRL		Lusinga Airport
Luvua	Haut-Katanga	FZRO		Luvua Airport
Malebo	Mai-Ndombe	FZBN		Malebo Airport
Mangai Ii	Kwilu	FZCM		Mangai Ii Airport - closed
Manono	Tanganyika	FZRA	MNO	Manono Airport
Manzalele	Kwango	FZDQ		Manzalele Airport
Masi-Manimba	Kwilu	FZCV	MSM	Masi-Manimba Airport
Matadi	Kongo Central	FZAM	MAT	**Matadi Tshimpi Airport**
Mbandaka	Équateur	FZEA	MDK	**Mbandaka Airport**
Mboie	Kasaï-Central	FZUI		Mboie Airport
Mbuji Mayi	Kasaï-Oriental	FZWA	MJM	**Mbuji Mayi Airport**
Mitwaba	Haut-Katanga	FZQV		Mitwaba Airport
Moba	Tanganyika	FZRB	BDV	Moba Airport
Moga	Maniema	FZOH		Moga Airport
Mokaria-Yamoleka	Mongala	FZFH		Mokaria-Yamoleka Airport
Moma	Kasaï-Central	FZUH		Moma Airport
Mombongo	Tshopo	FZFR		Mombongo Airport
Mongo Wa Kenda	Kwango	FZDN		Mongo Wa Kenda Airport
Monkoto	Tshuapa	FZGX		Monkoto Airport
Mpaka	Sud-Ubangi	FZFQ		Mpaka Airport
Muanda	Kongo Central	FZAG	MNB	**Muanda Airport**
Mukedi	Kwilu	FZDP		Mukedi Airport
Mukoy	Tanganyika	FZRC		Mukoy Airport
Mulungu	Sud-Kivu	FZMC		Mulungu Airport
Munkamba	Kasaï-Central	FZWL		Munkamba Airport
Musese	Kasaï	FZUO		Musese Airport
Mushie	Mai-Ndombe	FZBJ		Mushie Airport
Mutena	Kasaï	FZDJ		Mutena Airport
Mutshatsha	Lualaba	FZQN		Mutshatsha Airport
Mvula Sanda	Kongo Central	FZAY		Mvula Sanda Airport
Mwadingusha	Haut-Katanga	FZQJ		Mwadingusha Airport
Mweka	Kasaï	FZVM	MEW	Mweka Airport
Mwene-Ditu	Lomami	FZWE		Mwene-Ditu Airport
Nioki	Mai-Ndombe	FZBI	NIO	**Nioki Airport**
Nianga	Kasaï	FZDG		Nyanga Airport
Nyunzu	Tanganyika	FZRN		Nyunzu Airport
Nzamba	Kwango	FZDF		Nzamba Airport
Nzovu	Sud-Kivu	FZMD		Nzovu Airport
Obaye	North Kivu	FZNQ		Obaye Airport
Oshwe	Mai-Ndombe	FZBD		Oshwe Airport
Pepa	Tanganyika	FZRJ		Pepa Airport
Popokabaka	Kwango	FZCP		Popokabaka Airport
Punia	Maniema	FZOP	PUN	Punia Airport
Punia	Maniema	FZOQ		Punia-Basenge Airport
Pweto	Haut-Katanga	FZQC	PWO	Pweto Airport
Rutshuru	Nord-Kivu	FZNC		Rutshuru Airport
Rwindi	Nord-Kivu	FZNR		Rwindi Airport
Sandoa	Lualaba	FZSD		Sandoa Airport
Saulia	Maniema	FZOR		Saulia Airport
Semendua	Mai-Ndombe	FZBS		Semendua Airport
Shabunda	Sud-Kivu	FZMW		Shabunda Airport
Tandala	Sud-Ubangi	FZFT		Tandala Airport
Tingi-Tingi	Maniema	FZOB		Tingi-Tingi Airport
Tshikaji	Kasaï-Central	FZUS		Tshikaji Airport
Tshikapa	Kasaï	FZUV		Kalonda Airport
Tshikapa	Kasaï	FZUK	TSH	Tshikapa Airport
Tshimpumpu	Kasaï			Tshimpumpu Airport
Tshumbe	Sankuru	FZVJ		Tshumbe Airport
Vanga	Kwilu	FZCD		Vanga Airport
Watsa	Haut-Uélé	FZJI		Watsa Airport
Wembo	Sankuru	FZVN		Wembo Airport
Yalingimba	Mongala	FZGI		Yalingimba Airport
Yemo	Tshuapa	FZGY		Yemo Airport
Zongo	Kongo Central	FZAD		Celo-Zongo Airport
**Military airports**
Kamina	Haut-Lomami	FZSA		Kamina Air Base
Kisangani	Tshopo	FZIA		Simisini Air Base
Kitona	Kongo Central	FZAI		Kitona Air Base
Kotakoli	Nord-Ubangi	FZFP	KLI	Kotakoli Air Base
**Airports with unverified coordinates**
Bau		FZFF		Bau Airport
Beno		FZBE		Beno Airport
Beongo		FZEO		Beongo Airport
Bokada		FZFG		Bokada Airport
Bolongonkele		FZBP		Bolongonkele Airport
Boshwe		FZBK		Boshwe Airport
Boteka		FZGT		Boteka Airport
Dingele		FZVD		Dingele Airport
Gandajika	Kasai-Oriental	FZWC	GDJ	Gandajika Airport
Gbado		FZFV		Gbado Airport
Imesse		FZFB		Imesse Airport
Inkisi	Bas-Congo	FZAS		Inkisi Airport
Isongo		FZBH		Isongo Airport
Ito		FZCU		Ito Airport
Kania		FZRG		Sominka Airport
Kasese	Katanga	FZTS		Kaniama Kasese Airport
Katubwe		FZUT		Katubwe Airport
Kerekere		FZJR		Kerekere Airport
Kiapupe		FZOF		Kiapupe Airport
Kilomines		FZKF		Kilomines Airport
Kimano Ii		FZMP		Kimano Ii Airport
Kipata-Katika		FZDK		Kipata-Katika Airport
Kisengwa		FZWR		Kisengwa Airport
Kodoro		FZER		Kodoro Airport
Konde		FZAU		Konde Airport
Kutusongo		FZVF		Kutusongo Airport
Lukombe		FZVK		Batwa Airport
Mahagi		FZKC		Mahagi Airport
Malanga		FZDA		Malanga Airport
Mentole		FZEP		Mentole Airport
Moanza		FZDO		Moanza Airport
Muambi		FZUJ		Muambi Airport
Mutoto		FZUM		Mutoto Airport
Ngi		FZDH		Ngi Airport
Ngumu		FZES		Ngumu Airport
Obokote		FZOJ		Obokote Airport
Oduku		FZVV		Oduku Airport
Phibraki		FZOT		Phibraki Airport
Shongamba		FZVH		Shongamba Airport
Tono		FZDE		Tono Airport
Tshela	Bas-Congo	FZAH		Tshela Airport
Tshibala		FZUR		Tshibala Airport
Wasolo		FZVL		Wasolo Airport
Yangambi	Orientale	FZIR	YAN	Yangambi Airport
Yasa		FZDS		Yasa Airport
Yedi		FZKI		Yedi Airport
Yembe		FZEM		Yembe Airport
Yuki		FZCY		Yuki Airport

== See also ==
- Transport in the Democratic Republic of the Congo
- List of airports by ICAO code: F#FZ - Democratic Republic of the Congo (DRC), formerly known as Zaire
- Wikipedia: WikiProject Aviation/Airline destination lists: Africa#Congo, Democratic Republic of the
