= Lombo =

Lombo may refer to

- Lombo language, in the Kele language group of Bantu languages
- Lombo, Democratic Republic of the Congo, a community in Équateur province
- Lombo Airport, which serves Lombo, Democratic Republic of the Congo
- Lombo Pocket Watch, a champion Australian grey Standardbred colt foaled on 16 October 2003
- Lombo-Bouenguidi Department, a department of Ogooué-Lolo Province in eastern Gabon
- Ana Maria Lombo, an American-Colombian singer/songwriter and dancer
- Turumbu people, who live in the Isangi area of the Tshopo Province on both sides of the Congo River
