= Kamisuku Airport =

- IATA: none; ICAO: FZOC

Summary
- Airport type: Public
- Serves: Kalima
- Elevation AMSL: 1,831 ft / 558 m
- Coordinates: 2°33′20″S 26°37′30″E

Map
- Location of the airport in Democratic Republic of the Congo

Runways
Direction	Length		Surface
Direction	m	ft	Surface
18/36	1,240	4,068	Grass
- Sources: Google Maps GCM

Kamisuku Airport (ICAO: FZOC) is an airport serving the town of Kalima in Democratic Republic of the Congo.

The Kalima non-directional beacon (Ident: KAL) is located 7.7 nautical miles (14.3 km) east-southeast of the airport.

== See also ==
- Transport in the Democratic Republic of the Congo
- List of airports in the Democratic Republic of the Congo
