= Punia Airport =

- IATA: PUN; ICAO: FZOP

Summary
- Airport type: Public
- Serves: Punia
- Elevation AMSL: 1,742 ft / 531 m
- Coordinates: 1°23′30″S 26°20′55″E

Map
- Location of the airport in Democratic Republic of the Congo

Runways
Direction	Length		Surface
Direction	m	ft	Surface
10/28	1,140	3,740	Dirt
- Sources: GCM Google Maps

Punia Airport (IATA: PUN, ICAO: FZOP) is an airstrip serving the town of Punia, Maniema Province, Democratic Republic of the Congo. The runway parallels a section of the N31 road 10 kilometres (6.2 mi) northwest of Punia.

== See also ==
- Transport in the Democratic Republic of the Congo
- List of airports in the Democratic Republic of the Congo
