= Lomela Airport =

- IATA: none; ICAO: FZVE

Summary
- Airport type: Public
- Serves: Lomela, Democratic Republic of the Congo
- Elevation AMSL: 1,434 ft / 437 m
- Coordinates: 2°17′25″S 23°21′15″E

Map
- Location of the airport in Democratic Republic of the Congo

Runways
Direction	Length		Surface
Direction	m	ft	Surface
04/22	850	2,789	Grass
- Sources: GCM Bing Maps

Lomela Airport (ICAO: FZVE) is an airport serving Lomela, a village in Sankuru Province, Democratic Republic of the Congo.

== See also ==
- Transport in the Democratic Republic of the Congo
- List of airports in the Democratic Republic of the Congo
