= Lubondaie Airport =

- IATA: none; ICAO: FZUE

Summary
- Airport type: Public
- Serves: Lubondaie, Democratic Republic of the Congo
- Elevation AMSL: 2,657 ft / 810 m
- Coordinates: 6°34′15″S 22°38′50″E

Map
- Location of the airport in Democratic Republic of the Congo

Runways
Direction	Length		Surface
Direction	m	ft	Surface
08/26	810	2,657	Grass
- Sources: GCM Bing Maps

Lubondaie Airport (ICAO: FZUE) is an airstrip serving Lubondaie, a village in the Kasaï-Central Province (formerly Kasai-Occidental) of the Democratic Republic of the Congo.

== See also ==
- Transport in the Democratic Republic of the Congo
- List of airports in the Democratic Republic of the Congo
