= Kaniama Airport =

- IATA: KNM; ICAO: FZTK

Summary
- Airport type: Public
- Serves: Kaniama
- Elevation AMSL: 2,772 ft / 845 m
- Coordinates: 7°36′05″S 24°09′25″E

Map
- Location of the airport in Democratic Republic of the Congo

Runways
Direction	Length		Surface
Direction	m	ft	Surface
04/22	1,000	3,281	Grass
- Sources: Google Maps GCM

Kaniama Airport (IATA: KNM, ICAO: FZTK) is an airstrip serving the town of Kaniama in Haut-Lomami Province, Democratic Republic of the Congo. The runway is 8 kilometres (5.0 mi) south of Kaniama.

== See also ==
- Transport in the Democratic Republic of the Congo
- List of airports in the Democratic Republic of the Congo
