= Punia-Basenge Airport =

- IATA: none; ICAO: FZOQ

Summary
- Airport type: Public
- Serves: Punia
- Elevation AMSL: 1,738 ft (530 m)
- Coordinates: 1°29′00″S 26°26′25″E

Map
- Location of the airport in Democratic Republic of the Congo

Runways
Direction	Length		Surface
Direction	m	ft	Surface
05/23	950	3,118	Grass
- Sources: GCM Google Maps

Punia-Basenge Airport (ICAO: FZOQ) is an airstrip serving the town of Punia in Maniema Province, Democratic Republic of the Congo. The runway forms a section of the N31 road south of Punia.

== See also ==
- Transport in the Democratic Republic of the Congo
- List of airports in the Democratic Republic of the Congo
