= Mitwaba Airport =

Airport in Haut-Katanga, DRC

- IATA: none; ICAO: FZQV

Summary
- Airport type: Public
- Serves: Mitwaba
- Elevation AMSL: 5,240 ft / 1,597 m
- Coordinates: 8°38′40″S 27°20′40″E

Map
- Location of the airport in Democratic Republic of the Congo

Runways
Direction	Length		Surface
Direction	m	ft	Surface
08/26	1,020	3,346	Gravel
- Sources: Google Maps GCM

Mitwaba Airport (ICAO: FZQV) is an airport serving the town of Mitwaba in Haut-Katanga Province, Democratic Republic of the Congo.

== See also ==
- Transport in the Democratic Republic of the Congo
- List of airports in the Democratic Republic of the Congo
