= Katako'kombe Airport =

- IATA: none; ICAO: FZVG

Summary
- Airport type: Public
- Serves: Katako'kombe
- Elevation AMSL: 1,978 ft / 603 m
- Coordinates: 3°27′25″S 24°25′25″E

Map
- Location of the airport in Democratic Republic of the Congo

Runways
Direction	Length		Surface
Direction	m	ft	Surface
07/25	1,000	3,281	Grass
- Sources: GCM Google Maps

Katako'kombe Airport (ICAO: FZVG) is an airstrip serving the town of Katako'kombe in Democratic Republic of the Congo. The runway is 6 kilometres (3.7 mi) south of the town.

== See also ==
- Transport in the Democratic Republic of the Congo
- List of airports in the Democratic Republic of the Congo
