= Nyunzu Airport =

- IATA: none; ICAO: FZRN

Summary
- Airport type: Public
- Serves: Nyunzu
- Elevation AMSL: 2,297 ft / 700 m
- Coordinates: 5°57′05″S 28°02′10″E

Map
- Location of the airport in Democratic Republic of the Congo

Runways
Direction	Length		Surface
Direction	m	ft	Surface
08/26	1,780	5,840	Dirt
- Sources: Google Maps GCM

Nyunzu Airport (ICAO: FZRN) is an airport serving the town of Nyunzu in Tanganyika Province, Democratic Republic of the Congo.

== See also ==
- Transport in the Democratic Republic of the Congo
- List of airports in the Democratic Republic of the Congo
