= Bokungu Airport =

- IATA: none; ICAO: FZGF

Summary
- Serves: Bokungu
- Elevation AMSL: 1,214 ft / 370 m
- Coordinates: 0°35′25″S 22°17′55″E

Map
- Location of airport in Democratic Republic of the Congo

Runways
Direction	Length		Surface
Direction	m	ft	Surface
05/23	1,200	3,937	Grass
- Source: GCM Google Maps

Bokungu Airport (ICAO: FZGF) is an airport serving locality of Bokungu in Tshuapa Province, Democratic Republic of the Congo.

== See also ==
- Transport in the Democratic Republic of the Congo
- List of airports in the Democratic Republic of the Congo
