= Sandoa Airport =

- IATA: none; ICAO: FZSD

Summary
- Airport type: Public
- Serves: Sandoa
- Elevation AMSL: 3,022 ft / 921 m
- Coordinates: 9°43′05″S 22°55′40″E

Map
- Location of the airport in Democratic Republic of the Congo

Runways
Direction	Length		Surface
Direction	m	ft	Surface
03/21	1,300	4,265	Grass
- Sources: GCM Google Maps

Sandoa Airport (ICAO: FZSD) is an airstrip serving the city of Sandoa in Lualaba Province, Democratic Republic of the Congo. The runway is approximately 5 kilometres (3.1 mi) east of the city.

== See also ==
- Transport in the Democratic Republic of the Congo
- List of airports in the Democratic Republic of the Congo
