= Mwadingusha Airport =

- IATA: none; ICAO: FZQJ

Summary
- Airport type: Public
- Serves: Mwadingusha
- Elevation AMSL: 3,707 ft (1,130 m)
- Coordinates: 10°45′24″S 27°12′55″E

Map
- Location of the airport in Democratic Republic of the Congo

Runways
Direction	Length		Surface
Direction	m	ft	Surface
10/28	700	2,297	Grass
- Sources: GCM Google Maps

Mwadingusha Airport (ICAO: FZQJ) is an airstrip serving the city of Mwadingusha in Haut-Katanga Province, Democratic Republic of the Congo. Aerial images of the runway show little sign of recent use.

== See also ==
- Transport in the Democratic Republic of the Congo
- List of airports in the Democratic Republic of the Congo
