= Lulingu Tshionka Airport =

- IATA: none; ICAO: FZOG

Summary
- Airport type: Public
- Serves: Lulingu
- Elevation AMSL: 1,968 ft / 600 m
- Coordinates: 2°19′00″S 27°31′35″E

Map
- Location of the airport in Democratic Republic of the Congo

Runways
Direction	Length		Surface
Direction	m	ft	Surface
13/31	900	2,953	Dirt
- Sources: Google Maps/2010 GCM

Lulingu Tshionka Airport (ICAO: FZOG) is an airport serving the town of Lulingu in Sud-Kivu Province, Democratic Republic of the Congo. The runway is 1 kilometre (0.62 mi) west of Lulingu.

== See also ==
- Transport in the Democratic Republic of the Congo
- List of airports in the Democratic Republic of the Congo
