= Kinkungwa Airport =

Airport in Democratic Republic of the Congo

- IATA: KLY; ICAO: FZOD

Summary
- Airport type: Public
- Serves: Kalima
- Elevation AMSL: 1,812 ft / 552 m
- Coordinates: 2°34′35″S 26°44′00″E

Map
- Location of the airport in Democratic Republic of the Congo

Runways
Direction	Length		Surface
Direction	m	ft	Surface
06/24	1,180	3,871	Grass
- Sources: Google Maps GCM

Kinkungwa Airport (IATA: KLY, ICAO: FZOD) is an airport serving the town of Kalima in Maniema Province, Democratic Republic of the Congo.

The Kalima non-directional beacon (Ident: KAL) is located 2 nautical miles (3.7 km) nautical miles (14.3 km) east-southeast of the airport.

== See also ==
- Transport in the Democratic Republic of the Congo
- List of airports in the Democratic Republic of the Congo
