= Kailo Airport =

- IATA: none; ICAO: FZOO

Summary
- Serves: Kailo Territory
- Elevation AMSL: 1,804 ft / 550 m
- Coordinates: 2°37′50″S 26°06′00″E

Map
- Location of airport in the Democratic Republic of the Congo

Runways
Direction	Length		Surface
Direction	m	ft	Surface
07/25	790	2,592	Grass
- Source: GCM Google Maps

Kailo Airport (ICAO: FZOO) is an airport serving Kailo Territory in Maniema Province, Democratic Republic of the Congo.

== See also ==
- Transport in the Democratic Republic of the Congo
- List of airports in the Democratic Republic of the Congo
