= Inga Airport =

- IATA: none; ICAO: FZAN

Summary
- Airport type: Public
- Serves: Inga
- Elevation AMSL: 741 ft / 226 m
- Coordinates: 5°31′50″S 13°34′45″E

Map
- Location of the airport in Democratic Republic of the Congo

Runways
Direction	Length		Surface
Direction	m	ft	Surface
11/29	1,100	3,609	Asphalt
- Sources: Great Circle Mapper Google Maps

Inga Airport (ICAO: FZAN) is an airport serving the town of Inga and the Inga dams in the Kongo Central Province of the Democratic Republic of the Congo.

The airport has a control tower, and is on a narrow ridge at a lower elevation than the town. An overrun to the east will drop 200 metres (660 ft) into the Congo River.

The Inga non-directional beacon (ident: IG) is located on the field.

== See also ==
- Transport in the Democratic Republic of the Congo
- List of airports in the Democratic Republic of the Congo
