= Lokutu Airport =

- IATA: none; ICAO: FZIZ

Summary
- Airport type: Public
- Serves: Lokutu
- Elevation AMSL: 1,214 ft / 370 m
- Coordinates: 1°07′50″N 23°36′05″E

Map
- Location of the airport in Democratic Republic of the Congo

Runways
| Direction | Length | | Surface |
| Direction | m | ft | Surface |
|---|---|---|---|
| 07/25 | 950 | 3,117 | Grass |
- Sources: Google Maps GCM

Lokutu Airport (ICAO: FZIZ) is an airport serving the town of Lokutu in Tshopo Province, Democratic Republic of the Congo.

== See also ==
- Transport in the Democratic Republic of the Congo
- List of airports in the Democratic Republic of the Congo
