= Kala Airport =

- IATA: none; ICAO: FZFL

Summary
- Airport type: Closed
- Serves: Monganzu
- Elevation AMSL: 1,254 ft / 382 m
- Coordinates: 3°23′00″N 18°39′20″E

Map
- Location of the airport in Democratic Republic of the Congo

Runways
Direction	Length		Surface
Direction	m	ft	Surface
Closed
- Sources: Google Maps HERE Maps

Kala Airport (ICAO: FZFL) was an airstrip near Monganzu, a hamlet on the Ubangi River in Sud-Ubangi Province, Democratic Republic of the Congo.

Google Earth Historical Imagery (4/18/2017) shows brush and shrubbery have grown on the runway since the (5/24/2000) image.

== See also ==
- Transport in the Democratic Republic of the Congo
- List of airports in the Democratic Republic of the Congo
