= Lusinga Airport =

- IATA: none; ICAO: FZRL

Summary
- Airport type: Public
- Serves: Lusinga
- Elevation AMSL: 5,840 ft / 1,780 m
- Coordinates: 8°55′35″S 27°11′45″E

Map
- Location of the airport in Democratic Republic of the Congo

Runways
Direction	Length		Surface
Direction	m	ft	Surface
08/26	1,375	4,511	Grass
- Sources: Google Maps GCM

Lusinga Airport (ICAO: FZRL) is an airport serving the village of Lusinga in Haut-Katanga Province, Democratic Republic of the Congo.

== See also ==
- Transport in the Democratic Republic of the Congo
- List of airports in the Democratic Republic of the Congo
