= Bonkita Airport =

- IATA: none; ICAO: FZBF

Summary
- Serves: Bonkita, Democratic Republic of the Congo
- Elevation AMSL: 1,152 ft / 351 m
- Coordinates: 3°06′25″S 18°47′08″E

Map
- Location of airport in the Democratic Republic of the Congo

Runways
Direction	Length		Surface
Direction	m	ft	Surface
18/36	1,020	3,346	Grass
- Source: GCM Google Maps

Bonkita Airport (ICAO: FZBF) is an airstrip serving Bonkita, a village on the Lukenie River in the Mai-Ndombe Province, Democratic Republic of the Congo.

== See also ==
- Transport in Democratic Republic of the Congo
- List of airports in Democratic Republic of the Congo
