= Yalingimba Airport =

- IATA: none; ICAO: FZGI

Summary
- Airport type: Public
- Serves: Yalingimba
- Elevation AMSL: 1,427 ft / 435 m
- Coordinates: 2°16′25″N 22°50′50″E

Map
- Location of the airport in Democratic Republic of the Congo

Runways
Direction	Length		Surface
Direction	m	ft	Surface
18/36	1,300	4,265	Grass
- Sources: GCM Google Maps

Yalingimba Airport (ICAO: FZGI) is an airstrip serving the community of Yalingimba in Mongala Province, Democratic Republic of the Congo.

== See also ==
- Transport in the Democratic Republic of the Congo
- List of airports in the Democratic Republic of the Congo
