= Kipushi Airport =

Kipushi Airport Kipushya, Kipushia
- IATA: none; ICAO: FZWF

Summary
- Airport type: Public
- Serves: Kipushi
- Elevation AMSL: 2,953 ft / 900 m
- Coordinates: 6°08′10″S 25°09′32″E

Map
- Location of the airport in Democratic Republic of the Congo

Runways
Direction	Length		Surface
Direction	m	ft	Surface
13/31	850	2,789	Grass
- Sources: Google Maps GCM

Kipushi Airport (ICAO: FZWF) is an airport serving the village of Kipushi in Lomami Province, Democratic Republic of the Congo.

== See also ==
- Transport in the Democratic Republic of the Congo
- List of airports in the Democratic Republic of the Congo
