= Mpaka Airport =

- IATA: none; ICAO: FZFQ

Summary
- Airport type: Public
- Serves: Mpaka
- Elevation AMSL: 1,969 ft / 600 m
- Coordinates: 4°06′20″N 19°13′50″E

Map
- Location of the airport in Democratic Republic of the Congo

Runways
| Direction | Length | | Surface |
| Direction | m | ft | Surface |
|---|---|---|---|
| 01/19 | 1,500 | 4,921 | Grass |
- Sources: Google Maps GCM

Mpaka Airport (ICAO: FZFQ) is an airport serving the village of Mpaka in Sud-Ubangi Province, Democratic Republic of the Congo.

== See also ==
- Transport in the Democratic Republic of the Congo
- List of airports in the Democratic Republic of the Congo
