= Mongo Wa Kenda Airport =

- IATA: none; ICAO: FZDN

Summary
- Airport type: Public
- Serves: Mongo Wa Kenda
- Elevation AMSL: 1,804 ft / 550 m
- Coordinates: 6°55′05″S 16°55′10″E

Map
- Location of the airport in Democratic Republic of the Congo

Runways
Direction	Length		Surface
Direction	m	ft	Surface
18/36	800	2,625	Grass
- Sources: Google Maps GCM

Mongo Wa Kenda Airport (ICAO: FZDN) is an airstrip serving Mongo Wa Kenda, a hamlet on the Kwango River in Kwango Province, Democratic Republic of the Congo. The runway is just north of the village.

== See also ==
- Transport in the Democratic Republic of the Congo
- List of airports in the Democratic Republic of the Congo
