= Mukedi Airport =

- IATA: none; ICAO: FZDP

Summary
- Airport type: Public
- Serves: Mukedi
- Elevation AMSL: 1,804 ft / 550 m
- Coordinates: 5°38′00″S 19°47′00″E

Map
- Location of the airport in Democratic Republic of the Congo

Runways
Direction	Length		Surface
Direction	m	ft	Surface
01/19	660	2,165	Gravel
- Sources: Google Maps GCM

Mukedi Airport (ICAO: FZDP) is an airport serving the town of Mukedi in Kwilu Province, Democratic Republic of the Congo.

== See also ==
- Transport in the Democratic Republic of the Congo
- List of airports in the Democratic Republic of the Congo
