= Kotakoli Air Base =

Airport in Democratic Republic of the Congo

- IATA: KLI; ICAO: FZFP

Summary
- Airport type: Military
- Location: Kotakoli, Democratic Republic of the Congo
- Elevation AMSL: 1,800 ft (550 m)
- Coordinates: 4°09′17″N 21°39′46″E

Map
- Location within DRC

Runways
Direction	Length		Surface
Direction	m	ft	Surface
05/23	2,012	6,601	Laterite
- Sources: WAD GCM

Kotakoli Air Base (IATA: KLI, ICAO: FZFP) is a military airport at Kotakoli, a town in the Nord-Ubangi Province, Democratic Republic of the Congo.

The Kotakoli non-directional beacon (Ident: KOT) is 6.0 nautical miles (11.1 km) east of the airport.

== See also ==
- Transport in Democratic Republic of the Congo
- List of airports in Democratic Republic of the Congo
- Air Force of the Democratic Republic of the Congo
