= Moga Airport (Democratic Republic of the Congo) =

Airport of Moga

- IATA: none; ICAO: FZOH

Summary
- Airport type: Public
- Serves: Moga, Democratic Republic of the Congo
- Elevation AMSL: 1,434 ft / 437 m
- Coordinates: 2°27′40″S 26°48′50″E

Map
- Location of the airport in Democratic Republic of the Congo

Runways
Direction	Length		Surface
Direction	m	ft	Surface
18/36	640	2,100	Grass
- Sources: GCM Bing Maps OSM

Moga Airport (ICAO: FZOH) is an airport serving Moga, a hamlet in the Maniema Province of the Democratic Republic of the Congo.

The Kalima non-directional beacon (Ident: KAL) is located 8.3 nautical miles (15.4 km) southwest of the airport.

== See also ==
- Transport in the Democratic Republic of the Congo
- List of airports in the Democratic Republic of the Congo
