= Basongo =

Basongo may refer to

- Basongo, Democratic Republic of the Congo
  - Basongo Airport
- MV Basongo, a Panamanian coaster in service 1965-66
