= Mutena Airport =

- IATA: none; ICAO: FZDJ

Summary
- Airport type: Public
- Serves: Mutena
- Elevation AMSL: 2,395 ft / 730 m
- Coordinates: 6°45′50″S 21°09′30″E

Map
- Location of the airport in Democratic Republic of the Congo

Runways
Direction	Length		Surface
Direction	m	ft	Surface
09/27	640	2,100	Grass
- Sources: Google Maps GCM

Mutena Airport (ICAO: FZDJ) is an airport serving the town of Mutena in Kasaï Province, Democratic Republic of the Congo.

== See also ==
- Transport in the Democratic Republic of the Congo
- List of airports in the Democratic Republic of the Congo
