= Kempile Airport =

Kempile Airport Kutu-Kempili Airport
- IATA: none; ICAO: FZBV

Summary
- Airport type: Public
- Serves: Kutu
- Location: Kempile
- Elevation AMSL: 984 ft / 300 m
- Coordinates: 2°43′45″S 18°06′25″E

Map
- Location of the airport in Democratic Republic of the Congo

Runways
Direction	Length		Surface
Direction	m	ft	Surface
08/26	1,420	4,659	Grass
- Sources: Google Maps GCM

Kempile Airport (ICAO: FZBV) is an airport serving the Fimi River town of Kutu in Mai-Ndombe Province, Democratic Republic of the Congo. The runway is 4 kilometres (2.5 mi) west of Kutu, by the village of Kempile.

== See also ==
- Transport in the Democratic Republic of the Congo
- List of airports in the Democratic Republic of the Congo
