= Bukena Airport =

- IATA: none; ICAO: FZRE

Summary
- Serves: Bukena
- Elevation AMSL: 2,145 ft / 654 m
- Coordinates: 7°46′40″S 27°12′55″E

Map
- Location of airport in the Democratic Republic of the Congo

Runways
Direction	Length		Surface
Direction	m	ft	Surface
07/25	1,275	4,183	Grass
- Source: GCM Google Maps

Bukena Airport (ICAO: FZRE) is a rural airstrip serving the hamlet of Bukena in Haut-Lomami Province, Democratic Republic of the Congo.

The runway is 9 kilometres (5.6 mi) south of Bukena, near the village of Mukwende. It is at the northern edge of the Upemba Depression, 18 kilometres (11 mi) northeast of Lake Kabamba.

== See also ==
- Transport in the Democratic Republic of the Congo
- List of airports in the Democratic Republic of the Congo
- Talk:Bukena Airport
