= Isiro-Ville Airport =

- IATA: none; ICAO: FZJA

Summary
- Airport type: Closed
- Serves: Isiro
- Elevation AMSL: 2,507 ft / 764 m
- Coordinates: 2°46′55″N 27°37′32″E

Map
- Location of airport in the Democratic Republic of the Congo

Runways
Direction	Length		Surface
Direction	ft	m	Surface
Closed
- Source: OurAirports Google Maps

Isiro-Ville Airport (ICAO: FZJA) was an airport serving Isiro, Democratic Republic of the Congo. Isiro is now served by Matari Airport.

== See also ==
- Transport in the Democratic Republic of the Congo
- List of airports in the Democratic Republic of the Congo
