= Gwaka Airport =

- IATA: none; ICAO: FZFW

Summary
- Serves: Gwaka
- Elevation AMSL: 1,476 ft / 450 m
- Coordinates: 2°28′25″N 20°05′30″E

Map
- Location of airport in the Democratic Republic of the Congo

Runways
Direction	Length		Surface
Direction	m	ft	Surface
10/28	1,200	3,937	Grass
- Source: Great Circle Mapper Google Maps

Gwaka Airport (ICAO: FZFW) is an airport serving Gwaka in Sud-Ubangi Province, Democratic Republic of the Congo.

== See also ==
- Transport in the Democratic Republic of the Congo
- List of airports in the Democratic Republic of the Congo
