= Saulia Airport =

- IATA: none; ICAO: FZOR

Summary
- Airport type: Public
- Serves: Saulia, Democratic Republic of the Congo
- Elevation AMSL: 1,870 ft / 570 m
- Coordinates: 1°31′45″S 26°32′05″E

Map
- Location of the airport in Democratic Republic of the Congo

Runways
Direction	Length		Surface
Direction	m	ft	Surface
15/33	620	2,034	Grass
- Sources: GCM Google Maps

Saulia Airport (ICAO: FZOR) is an airstrip serving Saulia, a village in the Maniema Province of the Democratic Republic of the Congo.

The runway is on a slight ridge 1.6 kilometres (1 mi) west of Saulia.

== See also ==
- Transport in the Democratic Republic of the Congo
- List of airports in the Democratic Republic of the Congo
