= Dikungu Airport =

- IATA: none; ICAO: FZVP

Summary
- Airport type: Public
- Serves: Dikungu
- Elevation AMSL: 1,833 ft / 559 m
- Coordinates: 4°02′20″S 24°28′10″E

Map
- Location of the airport in Democratic Republic of the Congo

Runways
| Direction | Length | | Surface |
| Direction | m | ft | Surface |
|---|---|---|---|
| 10/28 | 1,400 | 4,593 | Gravel |
- Sources: Google Maps GCM

Dikungu Airport (ICAO: FZVP) is a highway strip airport serving the village of Dikungu in Sankuru Province, Democratic Republic of the Congo.

== See also ==
- Transport in the Democratic Republic of the Congo
- List of airports in the Democratic Republic of the Congo
