= Abumumbazi Airport =

- IATA: none; ICAO: FZFE

Summary
- Serves: Abumumbazi, Democratic Republic of the Congo
- Elevation AMSL: 1,499 ft / 457 m
- Coordinates: 3°41′45″N 22°09′00″E

Map
- Location of airport in Democratic Republic of the Congo

Runways
Direction	Length		Surface
Direction	m	ft	Surface
07/25	1,260	4,134	Dirt
- Source: GCM Google Maps

Abumumbazi Airport (ICAO: FZFE) is an airport serving the town of Abumumbazi, in the Nord-Ubangi Province of the Democratic Republic of the Congo. The runway is on the north side of the town.

== See also ==
- Transport in the Democratic Republic of the Congo
- List of airports in the Democratic Republic of the Congo
