= Nzovu Airport =

- IATA: none; ICAO: FZMD

Summary
- Airport type: Public
- Serves: Nzovu
- Elevation AMSL: 1,970 ft / 600 m
- Coordinates: 2°34′30″S 27°59′20″E

Map
- Location of the airport in Democratic Republic of the Congo

Runways
Direction	Length		Surface
Direction	m	ft	Surface
05/23	665	2,182	Grass
- Sources: Google Maps GCM

Nzovu Airport (ICAO: FZMD) is an airstrip serving the village of Nzovu in Sud-Kivu Province, Democratic Republic of the Congo. The runway is 2.5 kilometres (1.6 mi) south of the village, across the Lubimbi river.

== See also ==
- Transport in the Democratic Republic of the Congo
- List of airports in the Democratic Republic of the Congo
