= Bosondjo Airport =

- IATA: none; ICAO: FZGB

Summary
- Airport type: Closed
- Serves: Bosondjo
- Elevation AMSL: 1,312 ft / 400 m
- Coordinates: 1°52′15″N 21°45′35″E

Map
- Location of airport in Democratic Republic of the Congo

Runways
Direction	Length		Surface
Direction	ft	m	Surface
Closed
- Sources: Google Maps GCM

Bosondjo Airport (ICAO: FZGB) was an airstrip serving Bosondjo, a town in Mongala Province, Democratic Republic of the Congo.

Aerial imagery show trees and shrubbery growing on the former runway.

== See also ==
- Transport in the Democratic Republic of the Congo
- List of airports in the Democratic Republic of the Congo
