= Busala Airport =

- IATA: none; ICAO: FZCR

Summary
- Serves: Busala, Democratic Republic of the Congo
- Elevation AMSL: 1,312 ft / 400 m
- Coordinates: 4°10′05″S 18°41′55″E

Map
- Location of airport in the Democratic Republic of the Congo

Runways
| Direction | Length | | Surface |
| Direction | m | ft | Surface |
|---|---|---|---|
| 08/26 | 540 | 1,772 | Grass |
- Source: GCM Google Maps

Busala Airport (ICAO: FZCR) is a rural airstrip serving the village of Busala in Kwilu Province, Democratic Republic of the Congo.

== See also ==
- Transport in the Democratic Republic of the Congo
- List of airports in the Democratic Republic of the Congo
