= Bongimba Airport =

Airport in the Democratic Republic of the Congo

- IATA: none; ICAO: FZBB

Summary
- Serves: Bongimba, Democratic Republic of the Congo
- Elevation AMSL: 1,476 ft / 450 m
- Coordinates: 3°24′30″S 20°05′10″E

Map
- Location of airport in the Democratic Republic of the Congo

Runways
| Direction | Length | | Surface |
| Direction | m | ft | Surface |
|---|---|---|---|
| 12/30 | 1,200 | 3,937 | Grass |
- Source: GCM HERE Maps

Bongimba Airport (ICAO: FZBB) is an airport serving Bongimba, a hamlet in Mai-Ndombe Province, Democratic Republic of the Congo.

== See also ==
- Transport in the Democratic Republic of the Congo
- List of airports in the Democratic Republic of the Congo
