= Luena Airport (Democratic Republic of the Congo) =

- IATA: none; ICAO: FZTL

Summary
- Airport type: Public
- Serves: Luena
- Elevation AMSL: 2,349 ft / 716 m
- Coordinates: 9°28′05″S 25°45′30″E

Map
- Location of the airport in Democratic Republic of the Congo

Runways
Direction	Length		Surface
Direction	m	ft	Surface
14/32	1,500	4,921	Dirt
- Sources: Google Maps GCM

Luena Airport (ICAO: FZTL) is an airstrip serving the city of Luena in Haut-Lomami Province, Democratic Republic of the Congo. The runway is approximately 4 kilometres (2.5 mi) southwest of the town.

== See also ==
- Transport in the Democratic Republic of the Congo
- List of airports in the Democratic Republic of the Congo
