= Karawa Airport =

- IATA: none; ICAO: FZFS

Summary
- Airport type: Public
- Serves: Karawa
- Elevation AMSL: 1,640 ft / 500 m
- Coordinates: 3°21′42″N 20°17′50″E

Map
- Location of the airport in Democratic Republic of the Congo

Runways
Direction	Length		Surface
Direction	m	ft	Surface
08/26	950	3,117	Grass
- Sources: Google Maps GCM

Karawa Airport (ICAO: FZFS) is an airport serving the town of Karawa in Nord-Ubangi Province, Democratic Republic of the Congo.

== See also ==
- Transport in the Democratic Republic of the Congo
- List of airports in the Democratic Republic of the Congo
