= Nyanga Airport =

- IATA: none; ICAO: FZDG

Summary
- Airport type: Public
- Serves: Nianga
- Elevation AMSL: 2,231 ft / 680 m
- Coordinates: 5°57′55″S 20°26′10″E

Map
- Location of the airport in Democratic Republic of the Congo

Runways
Direction	Length		Surface
Direction	m	ft	Surface
17/35	1,000	3,281	Grass
- Sources: GCM Google Maps

Nyanga Airport (ICAO: FZDG) is an airstrip serving the village of Nianga in Kasaï Province, Democratic Republic of the Congo.

== See also ==
- Transport in the Democratic Republic of the Congo
- List of airports in the Democratic Republic of the Congo
