= Ingende Airport =

- IATA: none; ICAO: FZEI

Summary
- Airport type: Public
- Serves: Ingende
- Elevation AMSL: 1,246 ft / 380 m
- Coordinates: 0°18′30″S 18°56′45″E

Map
- Location of airport in Democratic Republic of the Congo

Runways
Direction	Length		Surface
Direction	m	ft	Surface
03/21	1,150	3,773	Grass
- Sources: Great Circle Mapper Google Maps

Ingende Airport (ICAO: FZEI) is an airstrip serving Ingende, a village on the Ruki River in Équateur Province, Democratic Republic of the Congo. The runway is 2 kilometres (1.2 mi) west of Ingende.

The Mbandaka VOR/DME (Ident: MBA) is located 40.9 nautical miles (75.7 km) west-southwest of the airstrip.

== See also ==
- Transport in the Democratic Republic of the Congo
- List of airports in the Democratic Republic of the Congo
