= Bambili-Dingila Airport =

- IATA: none; ICAO: FZKB

Summary
- Serves: Dingila, Bambili
- Elevation AMSL: 2,050 ft / 625 m
- Coordinates: 3°39′19″N 26°05′00″E

Map
- Location of airport in the Democratic Republic of the Congo

Runways
Direction	Length		Surface
Direction	m	ft	Surface
08/26	990	3,248	Grass
- Source: GCM Google Maps

Bambili-Dingila Airport (ICAO: FZKB) is an airstrip serving the towns of Bambili and Dingila in Bas-Uélé Province, Democratic Republic of the Congo. The runway is 3 kilometres (1.9 mi) east of Dingila, alongside the road to Bambili.

== See also ==
- Transport in the Democratic Republic of the Congo
- List of airports in the Democratic Republic of the Congo
