= Musese Airport =

- IATA: none; ICAO: FZUO

Summary
- Airport type: Public
- Serves: Musese
- Elevation AMSL: 1,870 ft / 570 m
- Coordinates: 5°25′50″S 21°30′02″E

Map
- Location of the airport in Democratic Republic of the Congo

Runways
Direction	Length		Surface
Direction	m	ft	Surface
17/35	1,000	3,281	Grass
- Sources: Google Maps GCM

Musese Airport (ICAO: FZUO) is a grass airstrip running alongside the N20 road at the hamlet of Musese, about 12 kilometres (7.5 mi) southeast of Luebo, in Kasaï Province, Democratic Republic of the Congo.

== See also ==
- Transport in the Democratic Republic of the Congo
- List of airports in the Democratic Republic of the Congo
