= Mangai Ii Airport =

- IATA: none; ICAO: FZCM

Summary
- Airport type: Closed
- Serves: Mangai
- Elevation AMSL: 1,410 ft / 430 m
- Coordinates: 4°02′05″S 19°31′35″E

Map
- Location of the airport in Democratic Republic of the Congo

Runways
Direction	Length		Surface
Direction	ft	m	Surface
Closed

Mangai Ii Airport (ICAO: FZCM) is a closed airport that formerly served the town of Mangai in Democratic Republic of the Congo. The 1,075 metres (3,527 ft) north–south runway is 1.8 kilometres (1.1 mi) north of the town, and is now overgrown and planted with oil palm.

== See also ==
- Transport in the Democratic Republic of the Congo
- List of airports in the Democratic Republic of the Congo
