= Yemo Airport =

- IATA: none; ICAO: FZGY

Summary
- Airport type: Public
- Serves: Yemo
- Elevation AMSL: 1,525 ft / 465 m
- Coordinates: 0°26′55″S 21°55′06″E

Map
- Location of the airport in Democratic Republic of the Congo

Runways
Direction	Length		Surface
Direction	m	ft	Surface
15/33	720	2,362	Grass
- Sources: GCM Google Maps

Yemo Airport (ICAO: FZGY) is an airstrip serving the village of Yemo in Tshuapa Province, Democratic Republic of the Congo. The narrow runway also serves as a road within the village, and tapers off to a trail at the southern end.

== See also ==
- Transport in Democratic Republic of the Congo
- List of airports in the Democratic Republic of the Congo
