= Bindja Airport =

- IATA: none; ICAO: FZBQ

Summary
- Airport type: Public
- Serves: Bindja
- Elevation AMSL: 1,201 ft / 366 m
- Coordinates: 3°22′45″S 19°35′45″E

Map
- Location of airport in the Democratic Republic of the Congo

Runways
Direction	Length		Surface
Direction	m	ft	Surface
10/28	1,500	4,921	Dirt
- Sources: GCM Google Maps

Bindja Airport (ICAO: FZBQ) is an airport serving Bindja, a hamlet on the Lukenie River in Mai-Ndombe Province, Democratic Republic of the Congo. The runway is 3 kilometres (1.9 mi) north of Bindja.

== See also ==
- Transport in the Democratic Republic of the Congo
- List of airports in the Democratic Republic of the Congo
