= Mulungu Airport =

Airport serving the town of Mulungu

- IATA: none; ICAO: FZMC

Summary
- Airport type: Public
- Serves: Mulungu
- Elevation AMSL: 2,400 ft (730 m)
- Coordinates: 2°58′25″S 27°52′10″E

Map
- Location of the airport in Democratic Republic of the Congo

Runways
Direction	Length		Surface
Direction	m	ft	Surface
02/20	800	2,625	Grass
- Sources: Google Maps GCM

Mulungu Airport (ICAO: FZMC) is an airport serving the town of Mulungu in Sud-Kivu Province, Democratic Republic of the Congo.

== See also ==
- Transport in the Democratic Republic of the Congo
- List of airports in the Democratic Republic of the Congo
