= Moma Airport (Democratic Republic of the Congo) =

- IATA: none; ICAO: FZUH

Summary
- Airport type: Public
- Serves: Moma
- Elevation AMSL: 2,789 ft / 850 m
- Coordinates: 7°14′05″S 22°36′30″E

Map
- Location of the airport in Democratic Republic of the Congo

Runways
Direction	Length		Surface
Direction	m	ft	Surface
17/35	900	2,953	Grass
- Sources: Google Maps GCM

Moma Airport (ICAO: FZUH) is an airstrip serving the village of Moma in Kasaï-Central Province, Democratic Republic of the Congo.

== See also ==
- Transport in the Democratic Republic of the Congo
- List of airports in the Democratic Republic of the Congo
