= Mutshatsha Airport =

- IATA: none; ICAO: FZQN

Summary
- Airport type: Public
- Serves: Mutshatsha
- Elevation AMSL: 3,806 ft / 1,160 m
- Coordinates: 10°33′45″S 24°25′10″E

Map
- Location of the airport in Democratic Republic of the Congo

Runways
Direction	Length		Surface
Direction	m	ft	Surface
10/28	730	2,395	Grass
- Sources: HERE Maps GCM

Mutshatsha Airport (ICAO: FZQN) is an airstrip serving the town of Mutshatsha, Lualaba Province, Democratic Republic of the Congo. The runway is approximately 10 kilometres (6.2 mi) northwest of the town.

== See also ==
- Transport in the Democratic Republic of the Congo
- List of airports in the Democratic Republic of the Congo
