= Mazelele Airport =

Airport in Kwango Province, the Congo

- IATA: none; ICAO: FZDQ

Summary
- Airport type: Public
- Serves: Mazelele
- Elevation AMSL: 1,650 ft / 503 m
- Coordinates: 7°16′55″S 17°01′50″E

Map
- Location of the airport in Democratic Republic of the Congo

Runways
Direction	Length		Surface
Direction	m	ft	Surface
12/30	1,000	3,281	Grass
- Sources: Google Maps GCM

Mazelele Airport (ICAO: FZDQ) is an airport serving the village of Mazelele in Kwango Province, Democratic Republic of the Congo. The village is 1 kilometre (0.62 mi) from the Kwango River, which is locally the border with Angola.

== See also ==
- Transport in the Democratic Republic of the Congo
- List of airports in the Democratic Republic of the Congo
