= Kashia (disambiguation) =

Kashia may refer to:

== People ==
- Guram Kashia (born 1987), Georgian footballer

== Other uses ==
- Kashia language, the critically endangered language of the Kashia band of the Pomo people
- Kashia Airport, an airstrip serving the city of Luputa in Lomami Province, Democratic Republic of the Congo
- Kashia Band of Pomo Indians of the Stewarts Point Rancheria, a federally recognized tribe of Pomo people in Sonoma County, California
