= Nzamba Airport =

Airport in Democratic Republic of the Congo

- IATA: none; ICAO: FZDF

Summary
- Airport type: Public
- Serves: Nzamba
- Elevation AMSL: 2,953 ft / 900 m
- Coordinates: 6°50′00″S 17°41′45″E

Map
- Location of the airport in Democratic Republic of the Congo

Runways
Direction	Length		Surface
Direction	m	ft	Surface
16/34	740	2,428	Grass
- Sources: Google Maps GCM

Nzamba Airport (ICAO: FZDF) is an airstrip serving the village of Nzamba in Kwango Province, Democratic Republic of the Congo. The runway is 1.6 kilometres (1 mi) west of the village.

== See also ==
- Transport in the Democratic Republic of the Congo
- List of airports in the Democratic Republic of the Congo
