= Fungurume Airport =

- IATA: none; ICAO: FZQF

Summary
- Serves: Fungurume
- Elevation AMSL: 3,855 ft / 1,175 m
- Coordinates: 10°32′00″S 26°19′30″E

Map
- Location of airport in the Democratic Republic of the Congo

Runways
Direction	Length		Surface
Direction	m	ft	Surface
11/29	1,705	5,594	Asphalt
- Source: GCM Google Maps

Fungurume Airport (ICAO: FZQF) is an airport serving the copper and cobalt mining community of Fungurume in Lualaba Province, Democratic Republic of the Congo.

== See also ==
- Transport in Democratic Republic of the Congo
- List of airports in Democratic Republic of the Congo
