= Banga Airport =

- IATA: none; ICAO: FZCI

Summary
- Location: Banga, Democratic Republic of the Congo
- Elevation AMSL: 2,493 ft / 760 m
- Coordinates: 5°27′32″S 20°27′45″E

Map
- Location of airport in Democratic Republic of the Congo

Runways
Direction	Length		Surface
Direction	m	ft	Surface
12/30	640	2,100	Grass
- Sources: Google Maps GCM

Banga Airport (ICAO: FZCI) is an airstrip serving the village of Banga in Kasai Province, Democratic Republic of the Congo.

== See also ==
- List of airports in the Democratic Republic of the Congo
- Transport in the Democratic Republic of the Congo
