= Kansimba Airport =

- IATA: none; ICAO: FZRK

Summary
- Airport type: Public
- Serves: Kansimba, Democratic Republic of the Congo
- Elevation AMSL: 5,413 ft / 1,650 m
- Coordinates: 7°19′30″S 29°10′25″E

Map
- Location of the airport in Democratic Republic of the Congo

Runways
Direction	Length		Surface
Direction	m	ft	Surface
06/24	2,050	6,726	Grass
- Sources: Google Maps GCM

Kansimba Airport (ICAO: FZRK) is an airstrip serving the hamlet of Kansimba in Tanganyika Province, Democratic Republic of the Congo.

== See also ==
- Transport in the Democratic Republic of the Congo
- List of airports in the Democratic Republic of the Congo
