= Idumbe Airport =

- IATA: none; ICAO: FZVU

Summary
- Airport type: Public
- Serves: Idumbe
- Elevation AMSL: 1,847 ft / 563 m
- Coordinates: 3°55′25″S 21°33′25″E

Map
- Location of the airport in Democratic Republic of the Congo

Runways
Direction	Length		Surface
Direction	m	ft	Surface
01/19	1,300	4,265	Grass
- Sources: Great Circle Mapper Google Maps

Idumbe Airport (ICAO: FZVU) is an airstrip serving the hamlet of Idumbe in Kasaï Province, Democratic Republic of the Congo.

== See also ==
- Transport in the Democratic Republic of the Congo
- List of airports in the Democratic Republic of the Congo
