= Luishi Airport =

- IATA: none; ICAO: FZQW

Summary
- Airport type: Public
- Serves: Luishi
- Elevation AMSL: 5,576 ft / 1,700 m
- Coordinates: 9°45′00″S 27°46′30″E

Map
- Location of the airport in Democratic Republic of the Congo

Runways
Direction	Length		Surface
Direction	m	ft	Surface
14/32	2,150	7,054	Gravel
- Sources: HERE Maps Makaya AIP GCM

Luishi Airport (ICAO: FZQW) is an airport serving the village of Luishi in Katanga Province, Democratic Republic of the Congo. The runway is 4 kilometres (2.5 mi) southeast of the village.

== See also ==
- Transport in the Democratic Republic of the Congo
- List of airports in the Democratic Republic of the Congo
