= Lubudi Airport =

- IATA: none; ICAO: FZQU

Summary
- Airport type: Public
- Serves: Lubudi
- Elevation AMSL: 4,541 ft / 1,384 m
- Coordinates: 9°54′50″S 25°58′10″E

Map
- Location of the airport in Democratic Republic of the Congo

Runways
Direction	Length		Surface
Direction	m	ft	Surface
08/26	900	2,953	Grass
- Sources: Google Maps GCM

Lubudi Airport (ICAO: FZQU) is an airport serving the town of Lubudi in Lualaba Province, Democratic Republic of the Congo. The runway is 15 kilometres (9.3 mi) north of the town.

== See also ==
- Transport in the Democratic Republic of the Congo
- List of airports in the Democratic Republic of the Congo
