= Kasaji Airport =

- IATA: none; ICAO: FZSJ

Summary
- Airport type: Public
- Serves: Kasaji
- Elevation AMSL: 3,297 ft / 1,005 m
- Coordinates: 10°22′25″S 23°25′30″E

Map
- Location of the airport in Democratic Republic of the Congo

Runways
| Direction | Length | | Surface |
| Direction | m | ft | Surface |
|---|---|---|---|
| 02/20 | 1,200 | 3,937 | Dirt |
- Sources: Google Maps GCM

Kasaji Airport (ICAO: FZSJ) is an airstrip serving the town of Kasaji in Lualaba Province, Democratic Republic of the Congo.

== See also ==
- Transport in the Democratic Republic of the Congo
- List of airports in the Democratic Republic of the Congo
