= Katale Airport =

- IATA: none; ICAO: FZNB

Summary
- Airport type: Public
- Serves: Katale
- Elevation AMSL: 4,589 ft / 1,399 m
- Coordinates: 1°19′30″S 29°22′30″E

Map
- Location of the airport in Democratic Republic of the Congo

Runways
Direction	Length		Surface
Direction	m	ft	Surface
18/36	890	2,920	Dirt

Helipads
Number	Length		Surface
Number	m	ft	Surface
1	15	49	Dirt
- Sources: Google Maps GCM

Katale Airport (ICAO: FZNB) is an airport serving the village of Katale in North Kivu Province, Democratic Republic of the Congo.

The Goma VOR/DME (Ident: GOM) is 24.4 nautical miles (45.2 km) south-southwest of the airport.

== See also ==
- Transport in the Democratic Republic of the Congo
- List of airports in the Democratic Republic of the Congo
