= Luozi Airport =

- IATA: LZI; ICAO: FZAL

Summary
- Airport type: Public
- Serves: Luozi, Democratic Republic of the Congo
- Elevation AMSL: 722 ft / 220 m
- Coordinates: 4°56′40″S 14°07′25″E

Map
- Location of the airport in Democratic Republic of the Congo

Runways
Direction	Length		Surface
Direction	m	ft	Surface
13/31	1,030	3,379	Dirt
- Sources: GCM Bing Maps

Luozi Airport (ICAO: FZAL) is an airport serving Luozi, a Congo River port in Kongo Central Province, Democratic Republic of the Congo.

== See also ==
- Transport in the Democratic Republic of the Congo
- List of airports in the Democratic Republic of the Congo
