= Djokele Airport =

- IATA: none; ICAO: FZBL

Summary
- Serves: Djokele, Democratic Republic of the Congo
- Elevation AMSL: 307 m / 1,007 ft
- Coordinates: 2°58′13″S 17°06′15″E

Map
- Location of airport in the Democratic Republic of the Congo

Runways
Direction	Length		Surface
Direction	m	ft	Surface
08/26	1,000	3,281	Grass
- Source: Great Circle Mapper Google Maps

Djokele Airport (ICAO: FZBL) is an airport serving Djokele, a village on the Fimi River in Mai-Ndombe Province, Democratic Republic of the Congo.

== See also ==
- Transport in the Democratic Republic of the Congo
- List of airports in the Democratic Republic of the Congo
