= Kwilu-Ngongo Airport =

- IATA: none; ICAO: FZAW

Summary
- Airport type: Public
- Serves: Kwilu-Ngongo
- Elevation AMSL: 1,296 ft / 395 m
- Coordinates: 5°30′10″S 14°42′25″E

Map
- Location of the airport in Democratic Republic of the Congo

Runways
Direction	Length		Surface
Direction	m	ft	Surface
07/25	1,300	4,265	Dirt
- Sources: Google Maps GCM

Kwilu-Ngongo Airport (ICAO: FZAW) is an airport serving the city of Kwilu-Ngongo in Kongo Central Province, Democratic Republic of the Congo. The runway is 2 kilometres (1.2 mi) east of the city.

== See also ==
- Transport in the Democratic Republic of the Congo
- List of airports in the Democratic Republic of the Congo
