= Mweka Airport =

- IATA: MEW; ICAO: FZVM

Summary
- Airport type: Public
- Serves: Mweka
- Elevation AMSL: 1,968 ft / 600 m
- Coordinates: 4°51′18″S 21°32′30″E

Map
- Location of the airport in Democratic Republic of the Congo

Runways
Direction	Length		Surface
Direction	m	ft	Surface
10/28	885	2,904	Grass
- Sources: Google Maps GCM

Mweka Airport (IATA: MEW, ICAO: FZVM) is an airport serving the town of Mweka in Democratic Republic of the Congo.

== See also ==
- Transport in the Democratic Republic of the Congo
- List of airports in the Democratic Republic of the Congo
