= Kasonga Airport =

Former airport in Democratic Republic of the Congo

- IATA: none; ICAO: FZUF

Summary
- Airport type: Closed
- Location: Kasonga, Democratic Republic of the Congo
- Elevation AMSL: 2,707 ft / 825 m
- Coordinates: 6°39′00″S 22°23′30″E

Map
- Location of the airport in Democratic Republic of the Congo

Runways
Direction	Length		Surface
Direction	m	ft	Surface
Closed
- Sources: GCM Google Maps

Kasonga Airport (ICAO: FZUF) was a rural airstrip near Kasonga in Kasaï-Central Province, Democratic Republic of the Congo.

== See also ==
- Transport in the Democratic Republic of the Congo
- List of airports in the Democratic Republic of the Congo
