= Kashia Airport =

- IATA: none; ICAO: FZWI

Summary
- Airport type: Public
- Serves: Luputa
- Location: Kashia
- Elevation AMSL: 2,887 ft / 880 m
- Coordinates: 7°13′15″S 23°45′35″E

Map
- Location of the airport in Democratic Republic of the Congo

Runways
| Direction | Length | | Surface |
| Direction | m | ft | Surface |
|---|---|---|---|
| 02/20 | 930 | 3,051 | Grass |
- Sources: GCM Google Maps

Kashia Airport (ICAO: FZWI) is an airstrip serving the city of Luputa in Lomami Province, Democratic Republic of the Congo. The airport is 6 kilometres (3.7 mi) southeast of Luputa.

== See also ==
- Transport in the Democratic Republic of the Congo
- List of airports in the Democratic Republic of the Congo
