= Wamba Airport =

Wamba Airport Kikongo Sur Wamba Airport
- IATA: none; ICAO: FZCW

Summary
- Airport type: Public
- Serves: Kikongo Sur Wamba
- Elevation AMSL: 1,312 ft / 400 m
- Coordinates: 4°15′50″S 17°11′05″E

Map
- Location of the airport in Democratic Republic of the Congo

Runways
Direction	Length		Surface
Direction	m	ft	Surface
14/32	700	2,297	Dirt
- Sources: Bing Maps GCM

Wamba Airport (ICAO: FZCW) is an airstrip serving the village of Kikongo Sur Wamba in Kwilu Province, Democratic Republic of the Congo. The runway is located between the village and the Wamba River.

== See also ==
- Transport in the Democratic Republic of the Congo
- List of airports in the Democratic Republic of the Congo
