= Obaye Airport =

- IATA: none; ICAO: FZNQ

Summary
- Airport type: Public
- Serves: Obaye, Democratic Republic of the Congo
- Elevation AMSL: 2,000 ft / 610 m
- Coordinates: 1°20′05″S 27°43′40″E

Map
- Location of the airport in Democratic Republic of the Congo

Runways
Direction	Length		Surface
Direction	m	ft	Surface
18/36	760	2,493	Grass
- Sources: GCM Bing Maps

Obaye Airport (ICAO: FZNQ) is an airstrip serving Obaye, a village in the North Kivu Province of the Democratic Republic of the Congo.

== See also ==
- Transport in the Democratic Republic of the Congo
- List of airports in the Democratic Republic of the Congo
