= Rwindi Airport =

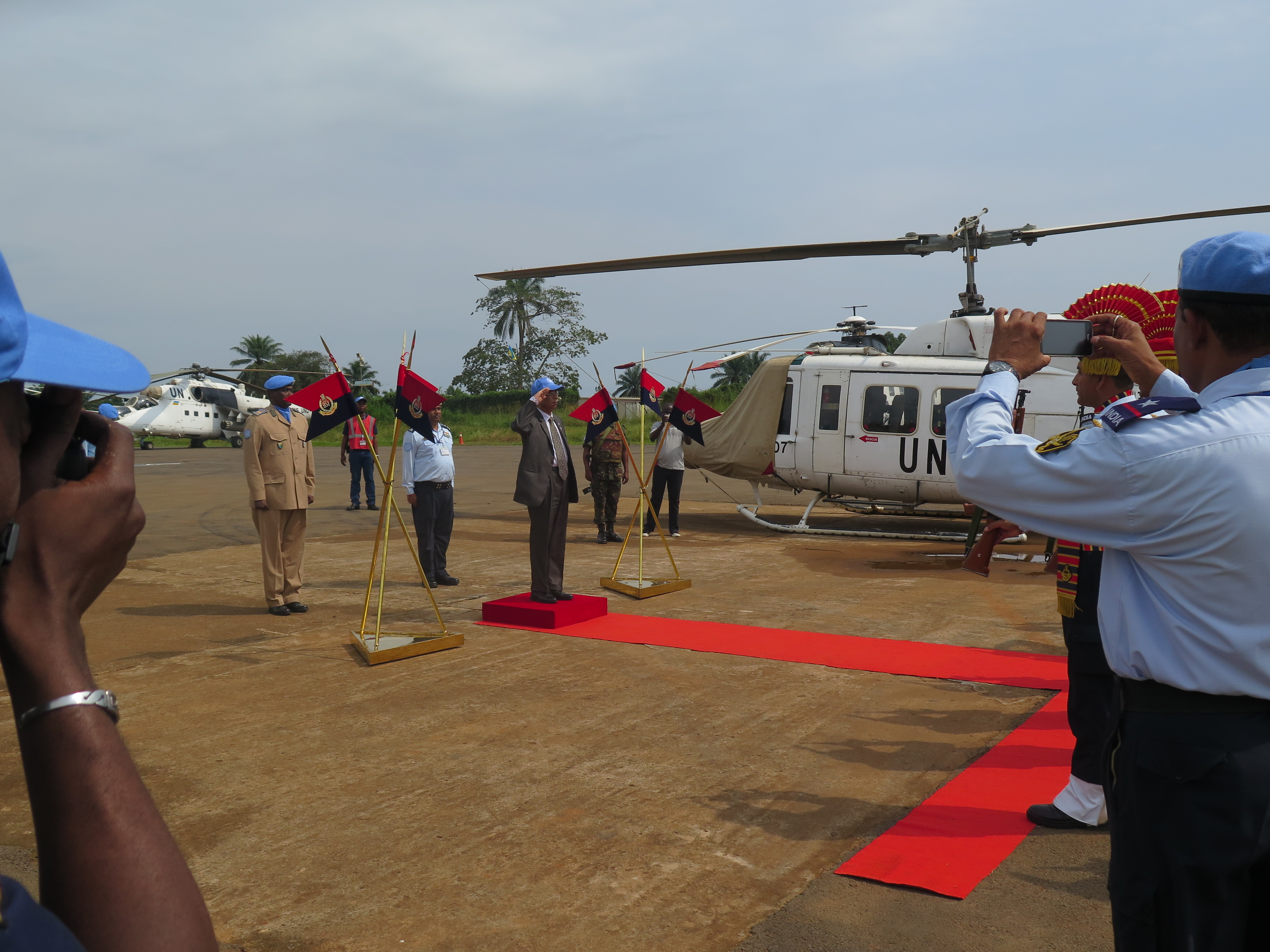
- MONUSCO helicopters during a ceremony at the airport
- IATA: none; ICAO: FZNR

Summary
- Airport type: Public
- Serves: Rwindi
- Elevation AMSL: 3,412 ft / 1,040 m
- Coordinates: 0°47′45″S 29°17′25″E

Map
- Location of the airport in Democratic Republic of the Congo

Runways
Direction	Length		Surface
Direction	m	ft	Surface
02/20	900	2,954	Dirt
- Sources: GCM Google Maps

Rwindi Airport (ICAO: FZNR) is an airport serving the town of Rwindi in Nord-Kivu Province, Democratic Republic of the Congo.

== See also ==
- Transport in the Democratic Republic of the Congo
- List of airports in the Democratic Republic of the Congo
