= Diboko Airport =

- IATA: none; ICAO: FZUP

Summary
- Serves: Diboko
- Elevation AMSL: 2,431 ft / 741 m
- Coordinates: 7°00′10″S 21°14′30″E

Map
- Location of airport in the Democratic Republic of the Congo

Runways
Direction	Length		Surface
Direction	m	ft	Surface
08/26	790	2,592	Grass
- Source: GCM Google Maps

Diboko Airport (ICAO: FZUP) is an airstrip serving Diboko, a village in Kasaï Province, Democratic Republic of the Congo.

== See also ==
- Transport in the Democratic Republic of the Congo
- List of airports in the Democratic Republic of the Congo
