= Tandala Airport =

- IATA: none; ICAO: FZFT

Summary
- Airport type: Public
- Serves: Tandala
- Elevation AMSL: 1,640 ft / 500 m
- Coordinates: 2°58′40″N 19°21′05″E

Map
- Location of the airport in Democratic Republic of the Congo

Runways
Direction	Length		Surface
Direction	m	ft	Surface
18/36	870	2,854	Grass
- Sources: Google Maps GCM

Tandala Airport (ICAO: FZFT) is an airport serving the town of Tandala in Sud-Ubangi Province, Democratic Republic of the Congo.

== See also ==
- Transport in the Democratic Republic of the Congo
- List of airports in the Democratic Republic of the Congo
