= Mukoy Airport =

- IATA: none; ICAO: FZRC

Summary
- Airport type: Public
- Serves: Mukoy
- Elevation AMSL: 5,249 ft / 1,600 m
- Coordinates: 7°32′57″S 28°40′20″E

Map
- Location of the airport in Democratic Republic of the Congo

Runways
Direction	Length		Surface
Direction	m	ft	Surface
08/26	1,200	3,937	Grass
- Sources: Google Maps GCM

Mukoy Airport (ICAO: FZRC) is a grass airstrip serving the hamlet of Mukoy in Tanganyika Province, Democratic Republic of the Congo.

== See also ==
- Transport in the Democratic Republic of the Congo
- List of airports in the Democratic Republic of the Congo
