= Ipeke Airport =

- IATA: none; ICAO: FZBU

Summary
- Serves: Ipeke
- Elevation AMSL: 1,017 ft / 310 m
- Coordinates: 2°32′15″S 18°14′40″E

Map
- Location of airport in the Democratic Republic of the Congo

Runways
Direction	Length		Surface
Direction	m	ft	Surface
09/27	1,440	4,724	Grass
- Source: GCM Google Maps

Ipeke Airport (ICAO: FZBU) is an airstrip serving Ipeke, a village on the western shore of Lake Mai-Ndombe in Mai-Ndombe Province, Democratic Republic of the Congo. The runway is 2 kilometres (1.2 mi) southwest of the village.

== See also ==
- Transport in the Democratic Republic of the Congo
- List of airports in the Democratic Republic of the Congo
