= Mokaria-Yamoleka Airport =

- IATA: none; ICAO: FZFH

Summary
- Airport type: Public
- Serves: Mokaria-Yamoleka, Democratic Republic of the Congo
- Elevation AMSL: 1,378 ft / 420 m
- Coordinates: 2°05′50″N 23°14′35″E

Map
- Location of the airport in Democratic Republic of the Congo

Runways
Direction	Length		Surface
Direction	m	ft	Surface
18/36	1,380	4,528	Grass
- Sources: GCM Bing Maps

Mokaria-Yamoleka Airport (ICAO: FZFH) is an airstrip serving Mokaria-Yamoleka, a village Mongala Province, Democratic Republic of the Congo. The airstrip is along the road south of the village

== See also ==
- Transport in the Democratic Republic of the Congo
- List of airports in the Democratic Republic of the Congo
