= Mombongo Airport =

- IATA: none; ICAO: FZFR

Summary
- Airport type: Public
- Serves: Mombongo
- Elevation AMSL: 1,476 ft / 450 m
- Coordinates: 1°39′10″N 23°09′10″E

Map
- Location of the airport in Democratic Republic of the Congo

Runways
Direction	Length		Surface
Direction	m	ft	Surface
14/32	1,050	3,445	Grass
- Sources: Google Maps GCM

Mombongo Airport (ICAO: FZFR) is an airport serving the Congo River town of Mombongo in Tshopo Province, Democratic Republic of the Congo.

== See also ==
- Transport in the Democratic Republic of the Congo
- List of airports in the Democratic Republic of the Congo
