= Mvula Sanda Airport =

- IATA: none; ICAO: FZAY

Summary
- Airport type: Public
- Serves: Kizulu
- Elevation AMSL: 1,148 ft / 350 m
- Coordinates: 5°37′36″S 13°25′32″E

Map
- Location of the airport in Democratic Republic of the Congo

Runways
Direction	Length		Surface
Direction	m	ft	Surface
06/24	914	2,999	Grass
- Sources: Google Maps GCM

Mvula Sanda Airport (ICAO: FZAY) is a grass airstrip serving the village of Kizulu in Kongo Central Province, Democratic Republic of the Congo. The runway is poorly marked, but corner markers are visible on the northeastern end.

== See also ==
- Transport in the Democratic Republic of the Congo
- List of airports in the Democratic Republic of the Congo
