= Bibanga Airport =

Airstrip in Bibanga, DR Congo

- IATA: none; ICAO: FZWB

Summary
- Airport type: Public
- Serves: Bibanga, Democratic Republic of the Congo
- Elevation AMSL: 2,953 ft / 900 m
- Coordinates: 6°15′12″S 23°56′45″E

Map
- Location of airport in Democratic Republic of the Congo

Runways
| Direction | Length | | Surface |
| Direction | m | ft | Surface |
|---|---|---|---|
| 07/25 | 625 | 2,051 | Dirt |
- Sources:Google Maps GCM

Bibanga Airport (ICAO: FZWB) is an airstrip serving the village of Bibanga in Kasai-Oriental Province, Democratic Republic of the Congo.

The Mbuji Mayi VOR/DME (Ident: MBY) is located 26.3 nautical miles (48.7 km) west-northwest of the airstrip.

== See also ==
- Transport in the Democratic Republic of the Congo
- List of airports in the Democratic Republic of the Congo
