= Kalonda Airport =

- IATA: none; ICAO: FZUV

Summary
- Airport type: Public
- Serves: Tshikapa, Democratic Republic of the Congo
- Location: Kalonda
- Elevation AMSL: 1,873 ft / 571 m
- Coordinates: 6°23′00″S 20°47′45″E

Map
- Location of the airport in the Democratic Republic of the Congo

Runways
Direction	Length		Surface
Direction	m	ft	Surface
04/22	1,000	3,281	Grass
- Sources: GCM Bing Maps

Kalonda Airport (ICAO: FZUV) is an airstrip serving Tshikapa in Kasaï Province, Democratic Republic of the Congo.

The airport is on the north side of Kalonda, a village 3 kilometres (1.9 mi) north of Tshikapa and 6 kilometres (3.7 mi) north of Tshikapa Airport.

== See also ==
- Transport in the Democratic Republic of the Congo
- List of airports in Democratic Republic of the Congo
