= Watsa Airport =

- IATA: none; ICAO: FZJI

Summary
- Airport type: Public
- Serves: Watsa
- Elevation AMSL: 3,199 ft / 975 m
- Coordinates: 2°59′40″N 29°32′50″E

Map
- Location of the airport in Democratic Republic of the Congo

Runways
Direction	Length		Surface
Direction	m	ft	Surface
06/24	730	2,395	Grass
- Sources: GCM Google Maps

Watsa Airport (ICAO: FZJI) is an airport serving the town of Watsa in Haut-Uélé Province, Democratic Republic of the Congo.

== See also ==
- Transport in the Democratic Republic of the Congo
- List of airports in the Democratic Republic of the Congo
