= Luniemu Airport =

- IATA: none; ICAO: FZJN

Summary
- Airport type: Public
- Serves: Luniemu
- Elevation AMSL: 3,272 ft / 997 m
- Coordinates: 8°12′30″S 24°42′10″E

Map
- Location of the airport in Democratic Republic of the Congo

Runways
Direction	Length		Surface
Direction	m	ft	Surface
17/35	1,400	4,593	Grass
- Sources: Google Maps GCM

Luniemu Airport (ICAO: FZJN) is an airport serving the village of Luniemu in Haut-Lomami Province, Democratic Republic of the Congo.

== See also ==
- Transport in the Democratic Republic of the Congo
- List of airports in the Democratic Republic of the Congo
