= Engengele Airport =

- IATA: none; ICAO: FZFC

Summary
- Serves: Engengele
- Elevation AMSL: 1,279 ft / 390 m
- Coordinates: 2°07′00″N 22°38′50″E

Map
- Location of airport in the Democratic Republic of the Congo

Runways
Direction	Length		Surface
Direction	m	ft	Surface
08/26	1,400	4,593	Gravel
- Source: Google Maps Great Circle Mapper

Engengele Airport (ICAO: FZFC) is an airport serving the Congo River village of Engengele in Mongala Province, Democratic Republic of the Congo.

The Bumba non-directional beacon (Ident: BBA) is located 10.4 nautical miles (19.3 km) west-northwest of the airport.

== See also ==
- Transport in the Democratic Republic of the Congo
- List of airports in the Democratic Republic of the Congo
