= Luiza Airport =

- IATA: LZA; ICAO: FZUG

Summary
- Airport type: Public
- Serves: Luiza
- Elevation AMSL: 2,890 ft / 881 m
- Coordinates: 07°11′20″S 022°23′30″E

Map
- Location of the airport in Democratic Republic of the Congo

Runways
Direction	Length		Surface
Direction	m	ft	Surface
14/32	1,040	3,412	Dirt
- Sources: Google Maps

Luiza Airport (IATA: LZA, ICAO: FZUG) is an airport in Luiza (town) in Kasaï-Central Province, Democratic Republic of the Congo. It is a local airport with no scheduled airline services.

== See also ==
- Transport in the Democratic Republic of the Congo
- List of airports in the Democratic Republic of the Congo
