= Wembo-Nyama Airport =

- IATA: none; ICAO: FZVN

Summary
- Airport type: Public
- Serves: Wembo-Nyama
- Elevation AMSL: 1,801 ft / 549 m
- Coordinates: 4°07′20″S 24°30′40″E

Map
- Location of the airport in Democratic Republic of the Congo

Runways
Direction	Length		Surface
Direction	m	ft	Surface
17/35	1,050	3,445	Gravel
- Sources: Google Maps GCM

Wembo-Nyama Airport (ICAO: FZVN) is an airstrip serving the town of Wembo-Nyama in Sankuru Province, Democratic Republic of the Congo.

== See also ==
- Transport in the Democratic Republic of the Congo
- List of airports in the Democratic Republic of the Congo
