= Bokela Airport =

- IATA: none; ICAO: FZDR

Summary
- Serves: Bokela, Democratic Republic of the Congo
- Elevation AMSL: 1,210 ft / 369 m
- Coordinates: 1°14′50″S 22°00′26″E

Map
- Location of airport in the Democratic Republic of the Congo

Runways
Direction	Length		Surface
Direction	m	ft	Surface
14/32	975	3,000	Laterite
- Sources: Google Maps, GCM

Bokela Airport (ICAO: FZDR) is an airport serving Bokela, a hamlet on the Lomela River in Tshuapa Province, Democratic Republic of the Congo.

== See also ==
- Transport in the Democratic Republic of the Congo
- List of airports in the Democratic Republic of the Congo
