= Malebo Airport =

- IATA: none; ICAO: FZBN

Summary
- Airport type: Public
- Serves: Malebo
- Elevation AMSL: 1,411 ft / 430 m
- Coordinates: 2°27′50″S 16°28′50″E

Map
- Location of the airport in Democratic Republic of the Congo

Runways
Direction	Length		Surface
Direction	m	ft	Surface
17/35	1,100	3,609	Grass
- Sources: Google Maps GCM

Malebo Airport (ICAO: FZBN) is an airstrip serving the hamlet of Malebo in Mai-Ndombe Province, Democratic Republic of the Congo.

== See also ==
- Transport in the Democratic Republic of the Congo
- List of airports in the Democratic Republic of the Congo
