= Munkamba Airport =

- IATA: none; ICAO: FZWL

Summary
- Airport type: Public
- Serves: Munkamba
- Elevation AMSL: 2,230 ft / 680 m
- Coordinates: 5°45′38″S 23°03′20″E

Map
- Location of the airport in Democratic Republic of the Congo

Runways
Direction	Length		Surface
Direction	m	ft	Surface
11/29	740	2,430	Gravel
- Sources: Google Maps GCM

Munkamba Airport (ICAO: FZWL) is an airport serving the town of Munkamba in Kasaï-Central Province, Democratic Republic of the Congo.

== See also ==
- Transport in the Democratic Republic of the Congo
- List of airports in the Democratic Republic of the Congo
