= Bolila Airport =

- IATA: none; ICAO: FZGC

Summary
- Serves: Bolila
- Elevation AMSL: 1,279 ft / 390 m
- Coordinates: 01°51′10″N 023°06′55″E

Map
- Location of airport in the Democratic Republic of the Congo

Runways
Direction	Length		Surface
Direction	m	ft	Surface
13/31	1,480	4,856	Grass
- Source: GCM Google Maps

Bolila Airport (ICAO: FZGC) is an airport serving Bolila, a village on the Congo River in Tshopo Province, Democratic Republic of the Congo. The runway parallels the river 1 kilometre (0.6 mi) downstream from Bolila.

== See also ==
- Transport in the Democratic Republic of the Congo
- List of airports in the Democratic Republic of the Congo
