= Boma Airport =

- IATA: BOA; ICAO: FZAJ

Summary
- Airport type: Public
- Serves: Boma, Democratic Republic of the Congo
- Elevation AMSL: 26 ft / 8 m
- Coordinates: 5°51′15″S 13°03′49″E

Map
- Location within DR Congo

Runways
Direction	Length		Surface
Direction	m	ft	Surface
03/21	1,020	3,346	Gravel
- Source: GCM Google Maps

Boma Airport (IATA: BOA, ICAO: FZAJ) is an airport serving the Congo River port city of Boma in the Kongo Central Province of the Democratic Republic of the Congo. The runway is within the southeastern part of the city, just north of the river.

The Boma non-directional beacon (Ident: BOM) is located on the field.

== See also ==
- Transport in the Democratic Republic of the Congo
- List of airports in the Democratic Republic of the Congo
