= Ilebo Airport =

- IATA: PFR; ICAO: FZVS

Summary
- Airport type: Public
- Location: Ilebo, Democratic Republic of Congo
- Elevation AMSL: 1,450 ft / 442 m
- Coordinates: 04°19′48″S 020°36′21″E

Map
- Location within DRC

Runways
Direction	Length		Surface
Direction	m	ft	Surface
07/25	1,255	4,117	Grass
- Sources: Google Maps, GCM

Ilebo Airport (IATA: PFR, ICAO: FZVS) is an airport serving the Kasai River port of Ilebo, in Kasaï Province, Democratic Republic of Congo. The runway is within the city.

== See also ==
- Transport in the Democratic Republic of the Congo
- List of airports in the Democratic Republic of the Congo
