= Tshumbe Airport =

- IATA: none; ICAO: FZVJ

Summary
- Airport type: Public
- Serves: Tshumbe
- Elevation AMSL: 1,804 ft / 550 m
- Coordinates: 4°02′20″S 24°22′00″E

Map
- Location of the airport in Democratic Republic of the Congo

Runways
Direction	Length		Surface
Direction	m	ft	Surface
09/27	1,910	6,266	Gravel
- Sources: GCM Google Maps

Tshumbe Airport (ICAO: FZVJ) is an airport serving the city of Tshumbe in Sankuru Province, Democratic Republic of the Congo. The runway is just southwest of the town.

== See also ==
- Transport in the Democratic Republic of the Congo
- List of airports in the Democratic Republic of the Congo
