= Dingele Airport =

- IATA: none; ICAO: FZVD

Summary
- Serves: Dingele, Democratic Republic of the Congo
- Elevation AMSL: 605 m (1,985 ft)
- Coordinates: 03°36′00″S 024°35′00″E

Map
- Location of airport in the Democratic Republic of the Congo
- Source: Great Circle Mapper

Dingele Airport (ICAO: FZVD) is an airport serving Dingele, Democratic Republic of the Congo.

== See also ==
- Transport in the Democratic Republic of the Congo
- List of airports in the Democratic Republic of the Congo
