= Doko Airport =

Airport in the Democratic Republic of Congo

- IATA: none; ICAO: FZJB

Summary
- Serves: Doko, Democratic Republic of the Congo
- Elevation AMSL: 2,874 ft / 876 m
- Coordinates: 3°08′40″N 29°35′30″E

Map
- Location of airport in the Democratic Republic of the Congo

Runways
Direction	Length		Surface
Direction	m	ft	Surface
02/20	1,900	6,234	Asphalt
- Source: Google Maps

Doko Airport (ICAO: FZJB) is an airport near Doko in Haut-Uélé Province, Democratic Republic of the Congo. The airport has been greatly expanded to serve the gold mining operation at Kalimva, the northwestern section of the Kibali gold deposit.

== See also ==
- Transport in the Democratic Republic of the Congo
- List of airports in the Democratic Republic of the Congo
