= BDV (disambiguation) =

BDV or BdV may refer to:

== Businesses and organisations ==
- Banco de Venezuela, an international bank
- Bremian Democratic People's Party, a regional party in Bremen, Germany
- Bund der Vertriebenen, a West German non-profit

== Other uses ==
- Bodo Parja, spoken in India (ISO 639:bdv)
- Borna disease virus
- Moba Airport, DR Congo (IATA:BDV)
- Viscera (wrestler) (ring name: Big Daddy V)
