= Binga Airport =

- IATA: none; ICAO: FZGE

Summary
- Serves: Binga
- Elevation AMSL: 1,476 ft / 450 m
- Coordinates: 2°22′00″N 20°30′50″E

Map
- Location of airport in Democratic Republic of the Congo

Runways
Direction	Length		Surface
Direction	m	ft	Surface
11/29	1,180	3,871	Grass
- Sources: Google Maps GCM

Binga Airport (ICAO: FZGE) is an airport serving the locality of Binga, in the Mongala Province of the Democratic Republic of the Congo.

The runway is just south of the town.

== See also ==
- Transport in the Democratic Republic of the Congo
- List of airports in the Democratic Republic of the Congo
