= Kajiji Airport =

Airport serving Kajiji, Bandundu Province, Democratic Republic of the Congo

- IATA: none; ICAO: FZCK

Summary
- Serves: Kulindji
- Elevation AMSL: 3,510 ft / 1,070 m
- Coordinates: 7°38′50″S 18°29′50″E

Map
- Location of airport in the Democratic Republic of the Congo

Runways
Direction	Length		Surface
Direction	m	ft	Surface
09/27	970	3,182	Gravel
- Source: GCM Google Maps

Kajiji Airport (ICAO: FZCK) is an airport serving Kajiji in Bandundu Province, Democratic Republic of the Congo. The airport and village are on a mesa with dropoffs to the west and south.

== See also ==
- Transport in the Democratic Republic of the Congo
- List of airports in the Democratic Republic of the Congo
