= Katwe Airport =

Airport in Democratic Republic of the Congo

- IATA: none; ICAO: FZQH

Summary
- Airport type: Public
- Serves: Katwe
- Elevation AMSL: 5,577 ft / 1,700 m
- Coordinates: 10°33′45″S 27°51′10″E

Map
- Location of the airport in Democratic Republic of the Congo

Runways
Direction	Length		Surface
Direction	m	ft	Surface
10/28	1,205	3,953	Gravel
- Sources: Google Maps GCM

Katwe Airport (ICAO: FZQH) is an airport serving the hamlet of Katwe in Kundelungu National Park, a protected area of Haut-Katanga Province, Democratic Republic of the Congo.

== See also ==
- Transport in the Democratic Republic of the Congo
- List of airports in the Democratic Republic of the Congo
