= Kasese Airport (Democratic Republic of the Congo) =

- IATA: none; ICAO: FZOS

Summary
- Airport type: Public
- Serves: Kasese
- Elevation AMSL: 1,863 ft / 568 m
- Coordinates: 1°38′18″S 27°05′05″E

Map
- Location of the airport in Democratic Republic of the Congo

Runways
Direction	Length		Surface
Direction	ft	m	Surface
06/24	3,610	1,100	Grass
- Sources: Google Maps Landings

Kasese Airport (ICAO: FZOS) is an airstrip serving the village of Kasese in Maniema Province, Democratic Republic of the Congo. The runway is 3 kilometres (1.9 mi) west of Kasese.

== See also ==
- Transport in the Democratic Republic of the Congo
- List of airports in the Democratic Republic of the Congo
