= Goyongo Airport =

- IATA: none; ICAO: FZFJ

Summary
- Serves: Goyongo
- Elevation AMSL: 1,640 ft / 500 m
- Coordinates: 4°10′35″N 19°48′05″E

Map
- Location of airport in the Democratic Republic of the Congo

Runways
Direction	Length		Surface
Direction	m	ft	Surface
12/30	860	2,822	Grass
- Source: GCM Google Maps

Goyongo Airport (ICAO: FZFJ) is an airstrip serving Goyongo, a hamlet in Nord-Ubangi Province, Democratic Republic of the Congo.

== See also ==
- Transport in the Democratic Republic of the Congo
- List of airports in the Democratic Republic of the Congo
