= Shabunda Airport =

- IATA: none; ICAO: FZMW

Summary
- Airport type: Public
- Serves: Shabunda
- Elevation AMSL: 1,837 ft / 560 m
- Coordinates: 2°41′25″S 27°20′40″E

Maps
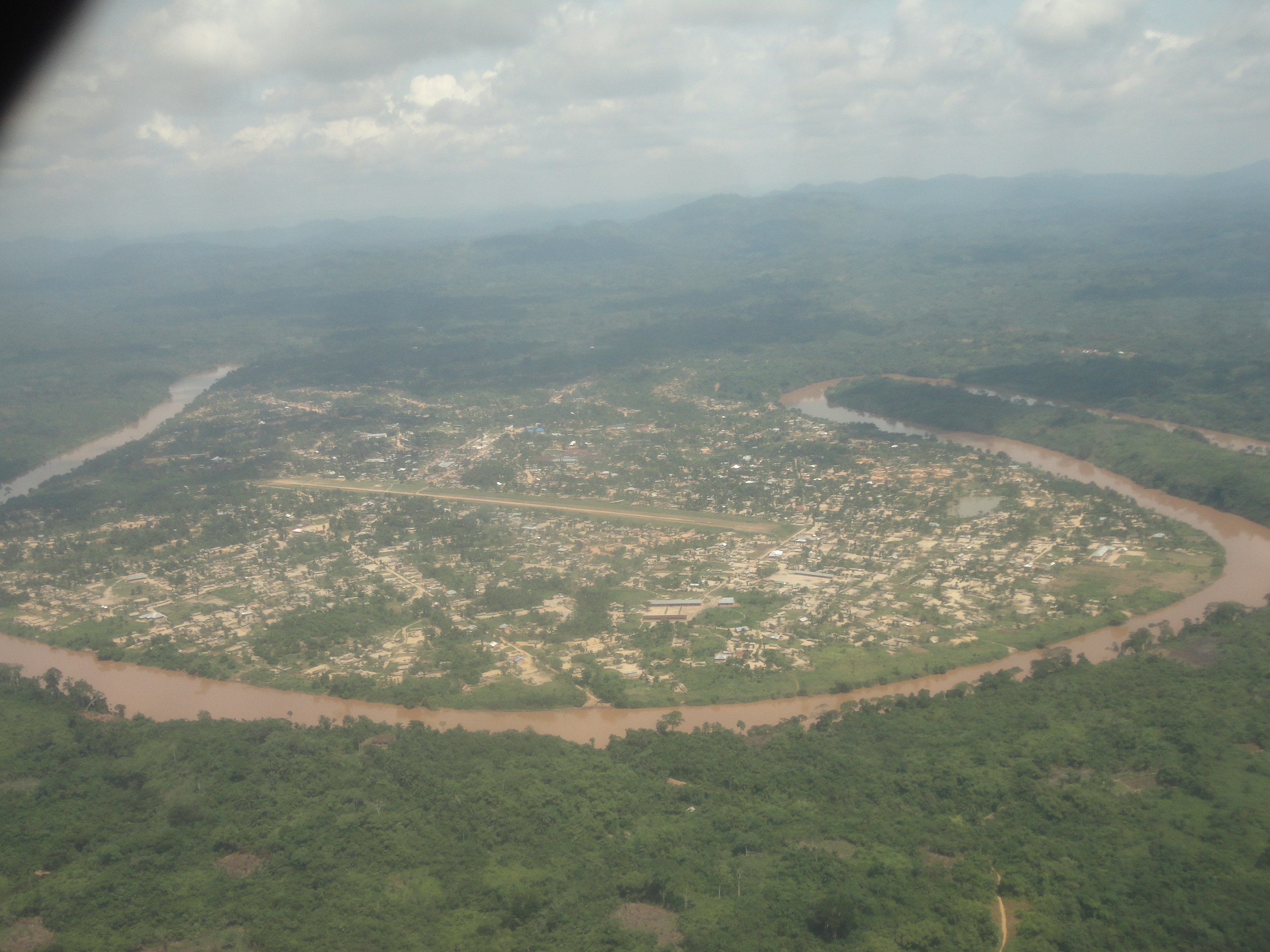

- Location of the airport in Democratic Republic of the Congo

Runways
Direction	Length		Surface
Direction	ft	m	Surface
11/29	3,118	950	Grass
- Sources: Google Maps

Shabunda Airport (ICAO: FZMW) is an airport serving the town of Shabunda in Sud-Kivu Province, Democratic Republic of the Congo. The runway is centered within the town, which is within a loop of the Ulindi River.

== See also ==
- List of airports in the Democratic Republic of the Congo
