= Lusanga Airport =

- IATA: LUS; ICAO: FZCE

Summary
- Airport type: Public
- Serves: Lusanga
- Elevation AMSL: 1,365 ft / 416 m
- Coordinates: 4°48′15″S 18°43′10″E

Map
- Location of the airport in Democratic Republic of the Congo

Runways
Direction	Length		Surface
Direction	ft	m	Surface
Closed
- Sources: Google Maps

Lusanga Airport (IATA: LUS, ICAO: FZCE) is a former airstrip that served the town of Lusanga in Kwilu Province, Democratic Republic of the Congo.

The grass runway has trees growing midfield and is unusable.

== See also ==
- List of airports in the Democratic Republic of the Congo
