= Celo-Zongo Airport =

- IATA: none; ICAO: FZAD

Summary
- Serves: Zongo
- Elevation AMSL: 506 m / 1,660 ft
- Coordinates: 04°47′25″S 14°54′20″E

Map
- Location of airport in the Democratic Republic of the Congo

Runways
Direction	Length		Surface
Direction	ft	m	Surface
15/33	2,460	750	Grass
- Source: Google Maps, Great Circle Mapper

Celo-Zongo Airport (ICAO: FZAD) is an airport serving Zongo in Kongo Central Province (not to be confused with Zongo in Sud-Ubangi province), Democratic Republic of the Congo.

== See also ==
- List of airports in the Democratic Republic of the Congo
