= Basengele Airport =

- IATA: none; ICAO: FZBW

Summary
- Airport type: Public
- Serves: Bokote
- Elevation AMSL: 1,309 ft / 399 m
- Coordinates: 1°51′40″S 17°57′40″E

Map
- Location of the airport in Democratic Republic of the Congo

Runways
Direction	Length		Surface
Direction	m	ft	Surface
07/25	960	3,150	Grass
- Sources: GCM Google Maps

Basengele Airport (ICAO: FZBW) is an airstrip serving the village of Bokote in Mai-Ndombe Province, Democratic Republic of the Congo.

== See also ==
- List of airports in the Democratic Republic of the Congo
