= Lombo Airport =

- IATA: none; ICAO: FZFN

Summary
- Airport type: Closed
- Location: Lombo, Democratic Republic of the Congo
- Elevation AMSL: 2,331 ft / 710 m
- Coordinates: 4.438890°N 19.538900°E

Map
- Location in the Democratic Republic of the Congo

Runways
Direction	Length		Surface
Direction	ft	m	Surface
Closed
- Sources: AirCharter

Lombo Airport (ICAO: FZFN) was an airstrip serving Lombo, a hamlet in the Nord-Ubangi Province of the Democratic Republic of the Congo.

The last Google Earth Historical Imagery satellite image to show the former 1,240 metres (4,070 ft) grass runway is (12/30/1986).

== See also ==
- Transport in the Democratic Republic of the Congo
- List of airports in the Democratic Republic of the Congo
