= Lake Tshangalele =

- Location within Democratic Republic of the Congo Location within Africa
- Coordinates: 10.880556°S 26.9925°E
- Lake type: artificial lake
- Primary inflows: Lufira River
- Primary outflows: Lufira River
- Basin countries: Democratic Republic of Congo
- Max. length: 25 km (16 mi)
- Max. width: 24 km (15 mi)
- Surface area: 362.5 km^{2} (140.0 sq mi)
- Average depth: 2.6 m (8.5 ft)
- Max. depth: 14 m (46 ft)
- Water volume: 1.063 km^{3} (0.255 cu mi)
- Surface elevation: 1,105.75 m (3,627.8 ft)

Lake Tshangalele, also known as Lake Lufira or Mwadingusha Reservoir, is an artificial lake in the south-east of the Democratic Republic of Congo. It is located about 20 km east of the city of Likasi in the old province of Katanga. It lies at about 1,100 m above sea-level in a large depression surrounded by low mountains. It was created by a dam built on the Lufira River near Mwadingusha in 1926 to provide hydro-electric power. The area of open water is about 362.5 km^{2}. During the wettest months of February and March, the area flooded reaches a maximum of 440 km^{2}. The lake is shallow with a mean depth of only 2.6 m.

The lake holds a variety of fish including longfin tilapia (Oreochromis macrochir), redbelly tilapia (Tilapia zillii), thinface cichlid (Serranochromis angusticeps) and North African catfish (Clarias gariepinus). It supports an important commercial fishery with the tilapias the main species caught. Surrounding the lake, there are extensive swamps where Typha and Cyperus grow. The region is rich in birdlife such as the Lake Lufira weaver (Ploceus ruweti) which is endemic to the area. The lake was declared a Biosphere Reserve in 1982 and is classed as an Important Bird Area by BirdLife International.
