= Tshikaji Airport =

- IATA: none; ICAO: FZUS

Summary
- Airport type: Public
- Serves: Tshikaji
- Elevation AMSL: 2,287 ft / 697 m
- Coordinates: 5°58′35″S 22°27′25″E

Map
- Location of the airport in Democratic Republic of the Congo

Runways
Direction	Length		Surface
Direction	m	ft	Surface
17/35	1,180	3,872	Gravel
- Sources: Google Maps

Tshikaji Airport (ICAO: FZUS) is an airstrip serving the town of Tshikaji in Kasaï-Central Province, Democratic Republic of the Congo. The runway is 8.5 kilometres (5.3 mi) south of the Kananga Airport.

== See also ==
- List of airports in the Democratic Republic of the Congo
