= Tshimpumpu Airport =

- IATA: none; ICAO: none

Summary
- Airport type: Public
- Serves: Tshimpumpu
- Elevation AMSL: 1,630 ft / 497 m
- Coordinates: 5°18′10″S 21°24′35″E

Map
- Location of the airport in Democratic Republic of the Congo

Runways
| Direction | Length | | Surface |
| Direction | m | ft | Surface |
|---|---|---|---|
| 14/32 | 800 | 2,625 | Grass |
- Sources: Google Maps

Tshimpumpu Airport is an airport serving the town of Tshimpumpu in Kasaï Province, Democratic Republic of the Congo. The runway is on the north side of town, west of the N20 highway.

== See also ==
- List of airports in the Democratic Republic of the Congo
