= Kasenga Airport =

- IATA: KEC; ICAO: FZQG

Summary
- Airport type: Public
- Serves: Kasenga
- Elevation AMSL: 3,146 ft / 959 m
- Coordinates: 10°21′20″S 28°37′00″E

Map
- Location of the airport in Democratic Republic of the Congo

Runways
Direction	Length		Surface
Direction	ft	m	Surface
01/19	4,265	1,300	Dirt
- Sources: Google Maps

Kasenga Airport (IATA: KEC, ICAO: FZQG) is an airport serving the town of Kasenga in Democratic Republic of the Congo.

== See also ==
- List of airports in the Democratic Republic of the Congo
