= Semendua Airport =

- IATA: none; ICAO: FZBS

Summary
- Airport type: Public
- Serves: Semendua
- Elevation AMSL: 1,148 ft / 350 m
- Coordinates: 3°14′15″S 18°08′00″E

Map
- Location of the airport in Democratic Republic of the Congo

Runways
Direction	Length		Surface
Direction	ft	m	Surface
11/29	3,610	1,100	Gravel
- Sources: Google Maps

Semendua Airport (ICAO: FZBS) is an airport serving the town of Semendua in Mai-Ndombe Province, Democratic Republic of the Congo.

== See also ==
- List of airports in the Democratic Republic of the Congo
