= Basongo Airport =

- IATA: BAN; ICAO: FZVR

Summary
- Serves: Basongo
- Elevation AMSL: 405 m / 1,330 ft
- Coordinates: 4°18′55″S 20°24′50″E

Map
- Location of airport in the Democratic Republic of the Congo

Runways
Direction	Length		Surface
Direction	m	ft	Surface
08/26	1,200	3,937	Grass
- Sources: GCM Google Maps

Basongo Airport (IATA: BAN, ICAO: FZVR) is an airport serving Basongo, a village on the Kasai River in Kasaï Province, Democratic Republic of the Congo. The runway is 4 kilometres (2.5 mi) east of the village.

== See also ==
- List of airports in the Democratic Republic of the Congo
- Transport in the Democratic Republic of the Congo
