= Bokada Airport =

- IATA: none; ICAO: FZFG

Summary
- Serves: Bokada
- Elevation AMSL: 502 m / 1,647 ft
- Coordinates: 04°07′20″N 019°25′08″E

Map
- Location of airport in the Democratic Republic of the Congo

Runways
Direction	Length		Surface
Direction	ft	m	Surface
16/34	2,600	792	Grass
- Sources: Google Maps, Great Circle Mapper

Bokada Airport (ICAO: FZFG) is an airport serving the village of Bokada in Équateur Province, Democratic Republic of the Congo.

== See also ==
- List of airports in the Democratic Republic of the Congo
