= Boma International Airport =

Boma International Airport Lukandu
- IATA: pending; ICAO: pending

Summary
- Airport type: Public
- Serves: Boma
- Elevation AMSL: 308 ft / 94 m
- Coordinates: 5°48′15″S 12°59′45″E

Map
- Location of the airport in Democratic Republic of the Congo

Runways
Direction	Length		Surface
Direction	m	ft	Surface
03/21	2,000	6,563	Clay
- Sources: Google Maps

Boma International Airport (IATA: pending, ICAO: pending) is an airport serving the city of Boma in Kongo Central Province, Democratic Republic of the Congo. The airport is at Lukandu, 22 kilometres (14 mi) northwest of Boma.

The airport is under construction as of 2024, with 2,000 metres (6,600 ft) of clay-surfaced runway completed in 2013, and extension to 3,000 metres (9,800 ft) planned.

As of January 2026, there has been no official announcement regarding the airport’s operational launch date.

== See also ==
- List of airports in the Democratic Republic of the Congo
