= Lufira River =

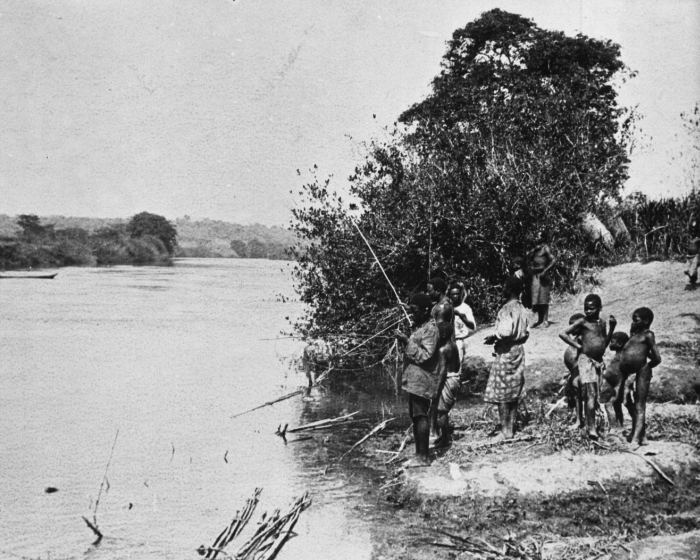

- The Lualaba River in red. Lufira River (not shown) flows in a northwestern direction before joining Lualaba just north of Bukama

Location
- Country: Democratic Republic of the Congo

Physical characteristics
- Mouth
  - location: Lualaba River
  - coordinates: 08°20′03″S 26°29′46″E
- Length: 500 km (310 mi)

Ramsar Wetland
- Official name: Bassin de la Lufira
- Designated: 31 October 2017
- Reference no.: 2318

The Lufira River is a tributary of the Lualaba River in the Democratic Republic of the Congo (DRC).

The Lufira rises in the Shaba plateau south of Likasi. The river was dammed in 1926 at Mwadingusha near Likasi to form Lake Tshangalele, a reservoir for a hydroelectric generator supplying power for copper smelting. It flows northwards through the Bia Mountains for about 500 km (310 mi), joining the Lualaba in Lake Kisale.
