= Moba Airport =

Airport in Democratic Republic of the Congo

- IATA: BDV; ICAO: FZRB

Summary
- Airport type: Public
- Serves: Moba
- Elevation AMSL: 2,953 ft / 900 m
- Coordinates: 7°05′05″S 29°44′15″E

Map
- Location of the airport in Democratic Republic of the Congo

Runways
Direction	Length		Surface
Direction	m	ft	Surface
06/24	1,248	4,094	Dirt
- Sources: Google Maps GCM

Moba Airport (IATA: BDV, ICAO: FZRB) is an airport serving the cities of Kirungu and Moba in Democratic Republic of the Congo. The airport is within Kirungu, 6 kilometres (3.7 mi) southwest of Moba.

== See also ==
- Transport in the Democratic Republic of the Congo
- List of airports in the Democratic Republic of the Congo
