= Nianga =

Nianga Nyanga
- Town
- Location within Democratic Republic of the Congo
- Coordinates: 5.96043°S 20.43516°E
- Country: DR Congo
- Province: Kasai
- Time zone: UTC+2 (Central Africa Time)

Nianga (Nyanga) is a village in Kasai province in the Democratic Republic of the Congo. It is around 65 kilometres (40 mi) north-west of Tshikapa, and 15 kilometres (9.3 mi) west of the Kasai river.

The town was founded as a mission post in 1923. During colonial times, Nianga was home to a primary school and also a secondary school.

Nianga is connected by road to Route Nationale 1 and is served by Nyanga Airport (FZDG).
