= Manzalele =

Village in Kwilu province, Democratic Republic of the Congo

Manzalele is a village in Kwilu province, the Democratic Republic of the Congo. It contains the Manzalele Airport.
