= Binga, Democratic Republic of the Congo =

Binga
- Location in the Democratic Republic of the Congo
- Coordinates: 2.40°N 20.42°E
- Country: Democratic Republic of the Congo
- Province: Mongala

Population (2010)
  - Total: 64,639
- Time zone: UTC+1 (Kinshasa Time)

Binga is a town in Mongala province of Democratic Republic of the Congo. In 2010 it had an estimated population of 64,639.

Binga is served by Binga Airport.

== Climate ==
Climate data for Binga, elevation 400 m (1,300 ft), (1971–2000)
Month	Jan	Feb	Mar	Apr	May	Jun	Jul	Aug	Sep	Oct	Nov	Dec	Year
Mean daily maximum °C (°F)	31.0 (87.8)	32.2 (90.0)	31.8 (89.2)	31.5 (88.7)	31.1 (88.0)	30.1 (86.2)	29.1 (84.4)	29.4 (84.9)	30.0 (86.0)	29.9 (85.8)	30.1 (86.2)	30.6 (87.1)	30.6 (87.0)
Mean daily minimum °C (°F)	19.0 (66.2)	19.4 (66.9)	20.2 (68.4)	20.6 (69.1)	20.5 (68.9)	20.0 (68.0)	19.7 (67.5)	19.7 (67.5)	19.7 (67.5)	19.6 (67.3)	19.7 (67.5)	19.2 (66.6)	19.8 (67.6)
Average precipitation mm (inches)	49.0 (1.93)	88.0 (3.46)	156.0 (6.14)	163.0 (6.42)	195.0 (7.68)	171.0 (6.73)	188.0 (7.40)	228.0 (8.98)	215.0 (8.46)	247.0 (9.72)	145.0 (5.71)	75.0 (2.95)	1,920 (75.58)
Average relative humidity (%)	84	79	80	82	84	86	88	87	85	86	86	85	84
Source: FAO
