= Kasaji =

Kasaji is a city and administrative district in the Democratic Republic of Congo. It is located in the province of Lualaba, in the southern part of the country, 1100 km southeast of the capital Kinshasa.

The region surrounding Kasaji is sparsely populated, with about 8 inhabitants per square kilometer.

Kasaji is crossed by the Benguela railway, which connects it to Kolwezi, the capital of the province of Lualaba, and; to the city of Luau, in Angola.

The city has Kasaji Airport.
