= Lombo, Democratic Republic of the Congo =

Lombo
- Location within Democratic Republic of the Congo
- Coordinates: 4.3475°N 19.6257°E
- Country: DR Congo
- Province: Nord-Ubangi
- Territory: Bosobolo
- Time zone: UTC+1 (West Africa Time)

Lombo is a community in the Bosobolo territory of Nord-Ubangi province in the extreme northwest of the Democratic Republic of the Congo. It is served by the small Lombo Airport.
