= Kalima, Democratic Republic of the Congo =

Kalima
- Location within Democratic Republic of the Congo
- Coordinates: 02°34′00″S 26°37′00″E

Population (2012)
  - Total: 48,337

Kalima is a town in Maniema Province, Congo. It is situated northeast of the provincial capital Kindu, between the Ulindi River and the Elila River, at an altitude of 2797 ft (852 m). The economic activity of Kalima and the surrounding area includes tin mining. In 2003 the town saw attacks by the Mai-Mai militias. Kalima has a hospital and is served by Kalima Airport. As of 2012, it had an estimated population of 48,337.

It is the see city of the Anglican Diocese of Kalima in the Province of the Anglican Church of the Congo.
