= Kailo Territory =

Kailo Wilaya ya Kailo (Swahili)
- Territory
- Interactive map of Kailo
- Coordinates: 2°38′S 26°06′E
- Country: DR Congo
- Province: Maniema
- Time zone: UTC+2 (CAT)

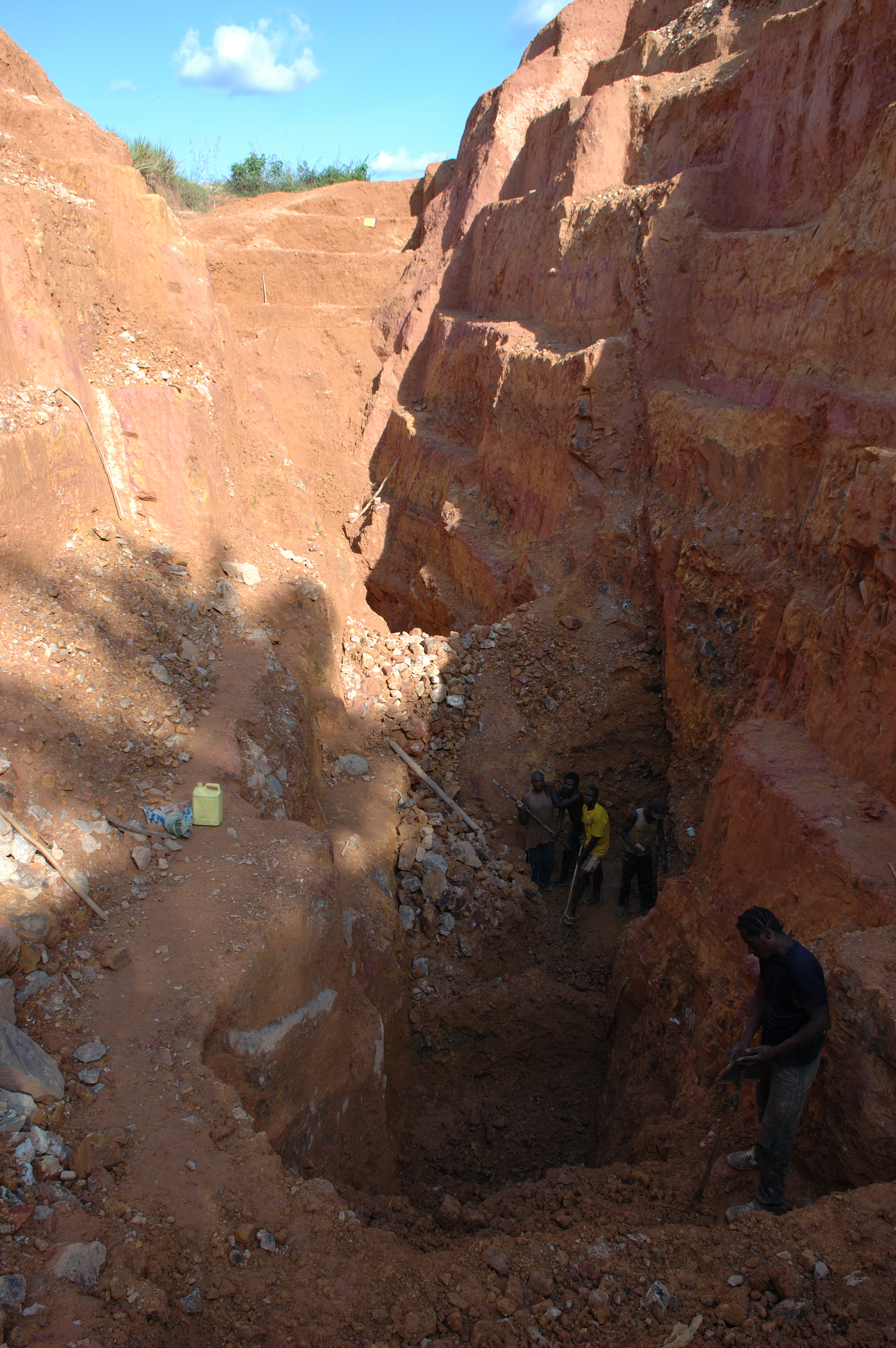
Miners in an open pit mine in Kailo, 2007

Kailo is a territory in Maniema province of the Democratic Republic of the Congo. Kailo Territory is home to open pit wolframite and cassiterite mines.
