= Luputa =

City of the Democratic Republic of the Congo

Coordinates: 7°09′58″S 23°43′04″E

Luputa is a city of the Democratic Republic of the Congo. It is located in Lomami Province. As of 2012, it had an estimated population of 39,875.
