= Lulingu =

Town in Democratic Republic of the Congo

Coordinates: 2°20′14″S 27°36′04″E

Lulingu is a town in the South Kivu province of the Democratic Republic of Congo, 140 kilometres (87 mi) west of Bukavu. It has a population of under 30,000. Sidney Coles described the town in 2018 as "isolated, set into misty hills that are blanketed by dense jungle".
