= Bokungo =

Coordinates: 0°40′S 22°18′E

- Location in Democratic Republic of the Congo
- Country: Democratic Republic of the Congo
- Province: Tshuapa

Population (2005)
  - Languages: Lingala

Bokungu is a territory of the Democratic Republic of the Congo. It is located in Tshuapa Province.
