= Sandoa =

City of the Democratic Republic of the Congo

- Location within Democratic Republic of the Congo
- Coordinates: 9.68°S 22.87°E

Population (2012)
  - Total: 10,208

Sandoa is a city in the Lualaba province of the Democratic Republic of the Congo. As of 2012, it had an estimated population of 10,208.
