= Mwadingusha =

- Location within Democratic Republic of the Congo
- Coordinates: 10.752155°S 27.235365°E
- Country: Democratic Republic of the Congo
- Province: Katanga
- District: Haut Katanga
- Territory: Kambove Territory

Mwadingusha is a community in the Kambove Territory of Haut Katanga District in the Democratic Republic of the Congo.

== Hydroelectricity ==
The Cornet Falls on the Lufira River had a drop of 113 metres (371 ft) at Mwadingusha. The river was dammed at the falls in 1925 with an 8 metres (26 ft) dyke to form Lake Tshangalele, a reservoir for a hydroelectric generator supplying power for copper smelting in Likasi. The newly formed Société Générale des Forces Hydro-électriques du Katanga (SOGEFOR) undertook construction over a four-year period, with most of the work done by large crews of laborers. The Emil Francqui power station was built to harness the power. It had six turbo-generators, five active at any time, and a generating capacity of 60,000 kilowatts.

== Lake ==
The dike was raised in 1934, 1938 and again in 1947 to a final height of 13 metres (43 ft). The resultant shallow lake has an area of over 410 square kilometres (160 sq mi) and supports up to 2,000 fishermen.

== Sources ==
- Blaes, X. (October 2008). "Découpage administratif de la République Démocratique du Congo" (PDF). PNUD-SIG. Archived from the original (PDF) on 2010-04-01.
- "La SOGEFOR" (in French). Yves Ghislain.
- "Mwadingusha Reservoir". FAO.
- US Bureau of Foreign Commerce (1954). World trade information service. U.S. Govt. Print. Off.
