= Lubondai =

Location in the Democratic Republic of the Congo

Coordinates: 6°34′0″S 22°36′0″E

A small rural location in the Democratic Republic of Congo, Lubondai or Lubondaie is characterized by its Presbyterian and Methodist missions that have built schools, hospitals, and stations.
