= Lomela =

City of the Democratic Republic of the Congo

- Location within Democratic Republic of the Congo
- Coordinates: 1.1°N 29.97°E

Population (2012)
  - Total: 10,883

Lomela is a city in Kasaï-Oriental province of the Democratic Republic of the Congo. As of 2012, it had an estimated population of 10,883.
