= Lokutu =

Coordinates: 1.1444°N 23.6025°E

Lokutu (sometimes spelled Lukutu) is a town in Tshopo province, Democratic Republic of the Congo. It is on the west bank of the Congo River, and was formerly named Elisabetha.

== Local Statistics ==
Lokutu has 747 kilometres of operational roads. It also have 1,985 houses, 60 schools, two hospitals, eight dispensaries, and two health centers.

== Feronia's Oil Palm Plantations ==
The Feronia Plantation in Lokutu is the company's largest plantation, 63,560 hectares (157,100 acres), and was established in 1920. The plantation is situated alongside the Congo River in the Orientale Province of the DRC.

Although the plantation is 63,000+ hectares, wildlife buffer zones make up a large amount of the area, so it will never be planted on.

== Conflict ==
On March 16, 2019, within the Lokutu oil palm plantation concession area of the Canadian company Feronia Inc, in the Tshopo Province, in the Democratic Republic of the Congo, military forces fired live bullets at local Bolombo and Wamba villagers in the municipality of Mwingi, and from Bokala-wamba. This incident followed weeks of tension that had been growing between the locals and the companies at Lokutu and Boteka plantations. Complaints have been filed by the communities with the international complaints mechanism of the German development bank (DEG) denouncing the company's illegal occupation of their territories.

The communities blocked the company vehicles from transporting palm nuts from the plantation sites and state it is the only way for them to be heard. The communities have also been protesting unpaid or underpaid wages for local workers on the plantations. According to some local sources, Feronia claimed to have resumed payments, but many locals stated they only received partial payments.

The villagers took action and began harvesting and processing palm oil from the plantation themselves and destroyed multiple bridges used by the company for transport. This is when the military action and shots fired began to take place.

National and international civil society organizations are actively supporting the affected communities. The long-standing occupation of Lokutu territory by Feronia was a direct cause of these conflicts.

Between 12 and 16 September 2019, the national police arrested numerous villagers from communities involved in an international mediation process regarding the occupation of their land by the Canadian palm oil company Feronia Inc (PHC-Feronia in Lokutu). Following a meeting between community leaders and members of the German development bank's complaint mechanism panel, these arrests were violently made in the middle of the night.

The Support and Information Network for National Organizations (RIAO-RDC) denounces the threats and attacks by PHC-Feronia targeting members of the communities that mandated RIAO-RDC to file a complaint on their behalf with the complaint mechanism of the DEG (German development bank) so that ultimately the Congolese communities can have their claims against this Canadian company heard at the international and national level.
