= Nyunzu =

- Commune
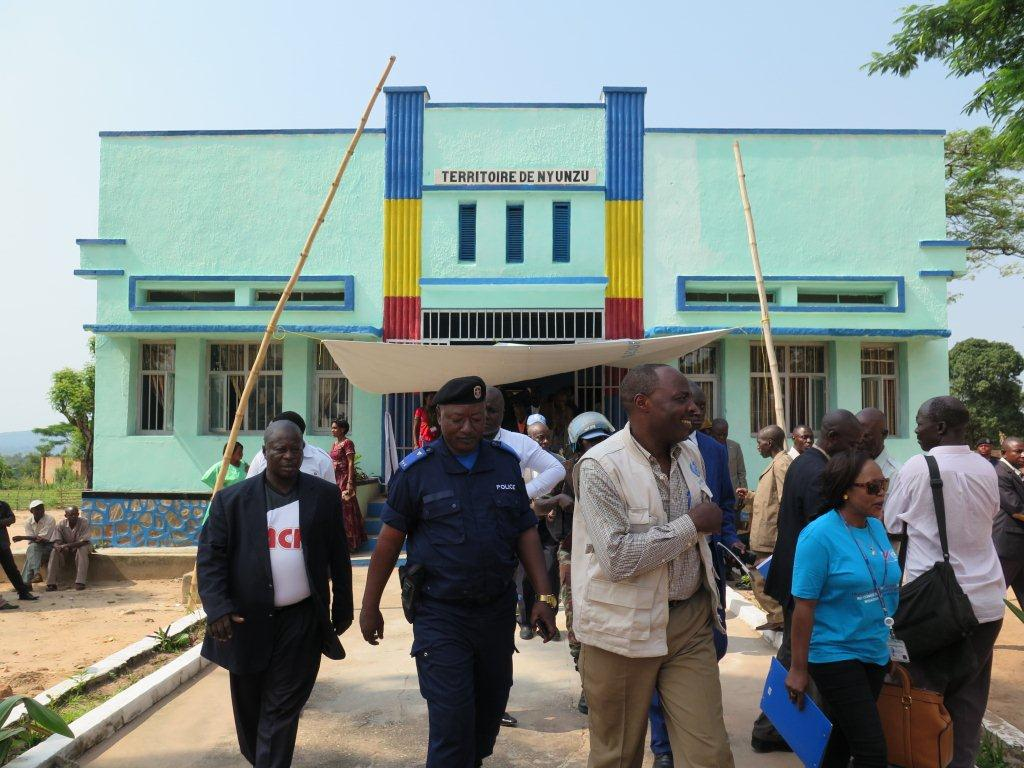
- reclaiming the public building assisted by MONUSCO

- Location in DRC
- Coordinates: 5°57′S 28°02′E
- Country: DR Congo
- Province: Tanganyika
- Territory: Nyunzu

Population (2012)
  - Total: 42,589
- Time zone: UTC+2 (Central Africa Time)
- Climate: Cwb

Nyunzu is a town in Tanganyika Province (formerly part of Katanga Province), located in the eastern Democratic Republic of the Congo.
