= Mitwaba =

City of the Democratic Republic of the Congo

- Location within Democratic Republic of the Congo
- Coordinates: 8.63°S 27.33°E

Population (2012)
  - Total: 4,332

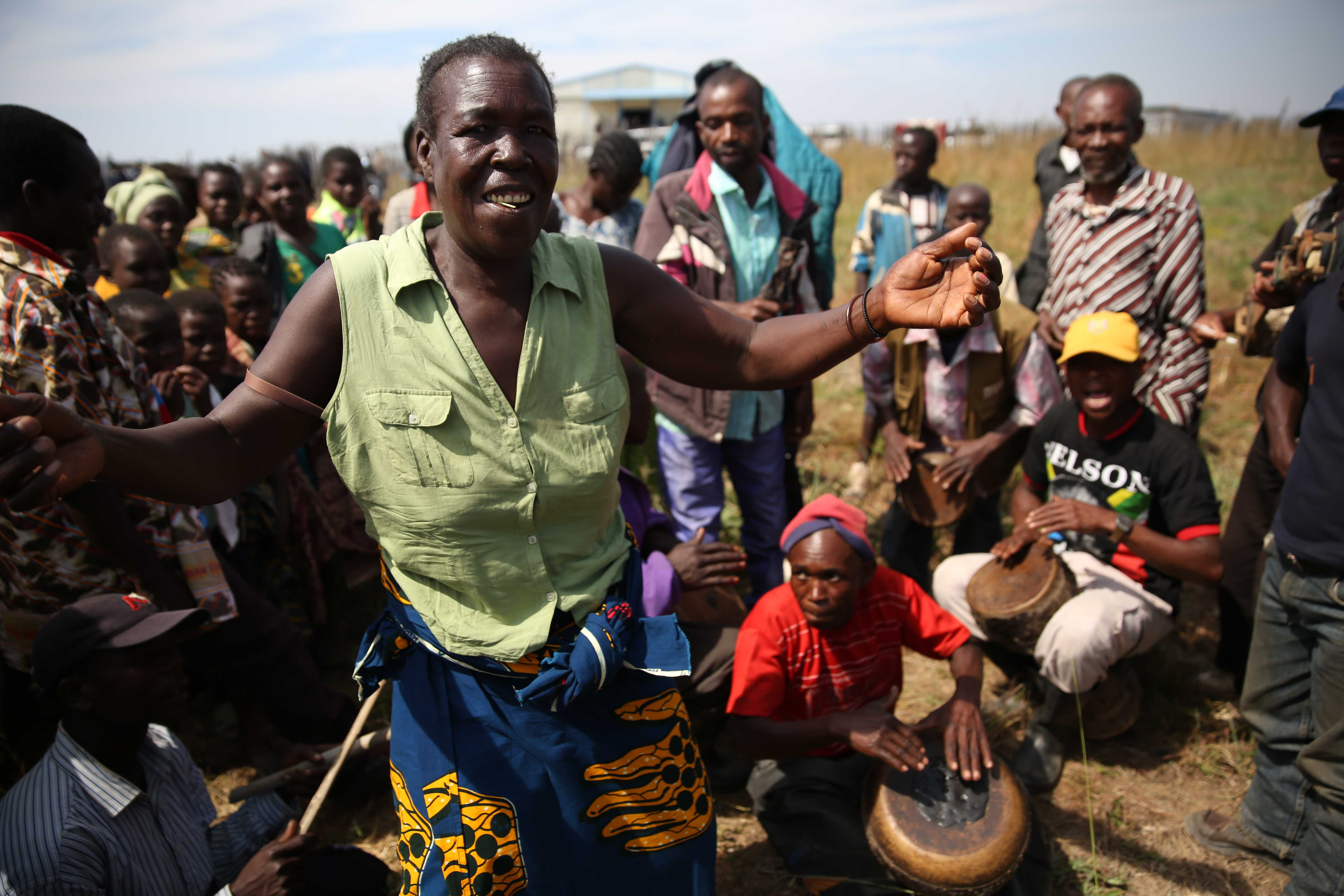
Mitwaba, Katanga province, DR Congo: A group of internally displaced persons perform traditional music and dance on the occasion of a meeting between MONUSCO and the local population.

Mitwaba is a city in the Haut-Katanga province of the Democratic Republic of the Congo. As of 2012, it had an estimated population of 4,332.

On December 24, 1947, the first fatal airliner crash in present-day Congo occurred near Mitwaba. A Lockheed Lodestar on a Sabena flight from the city to Manono went down inverted after engine issues, killing all 5 onboard.
