= Katako-Kombe Territory =

Katako-Kombe
- Territory
- Interactive map of Katako-Kombe
- Coordinates: 3°24′00″S 24°25′12″E
- Country: DR Congo
- Province: Sankuru

Area
  - Total: 25,949 km^{2} (10,019 sq mi)

Population (2020)
  - Total: 1,488,922
  - Density: 57.379/km^{2} (148.61/sq mi)
- Time zone: UTC+2 (CAT)

Katako-Kombe is a territory of Sankuru Province of the Democratic Republic of the Congo and is part of the region known as Kasaï. It is traditionally considered the homeland of the Tetela people.

In honor of the Congo’s first prime minister, Patrice Lumumba, his birthplace and the area of his childhood was split from the territory to form the new city of Lumumbaville which came into effect around 2022.
