= Inga, Democratic Republic of the Congo =

City of the Democratic Republic of the Congo

Inga
- Location within Democratic Republic of the Congo
- Coordinates: 5.5°S 13.57°E

Population (2012)
  - Total: 10,887

Inga is a city of Kongo Central province in the Democratic Republic of the Congo. As of 2012, it had an estimated population of 10,887.
