= Kaniama =

City of the Democratic Republic of the Congo

- Location within Democratic Republic of the Congo
- Coordinates: 7.57°S 24.17°E

Population (2012)
  - Total: 62,723

Kaniama is a city of the Democratic Republic of the Congo. It is located in Haut-Lomami. As of 2012, it had an estimated population of 62,723
