= Punia, Democratic Republic of the Congo =

City of the Democratic Republic of the Congo

Punia
- Location within Democratic Republic of the Congo
- Coordinates: 1.45°S 26.42°E

Population (2012)
  - Total: 19,716

Punia is a city in Maniema province of the Democratic Republic of the Congo. As of 2012, it had an estimated population of 19,716.
