= Transport in the Democratic Republic of the Congo =

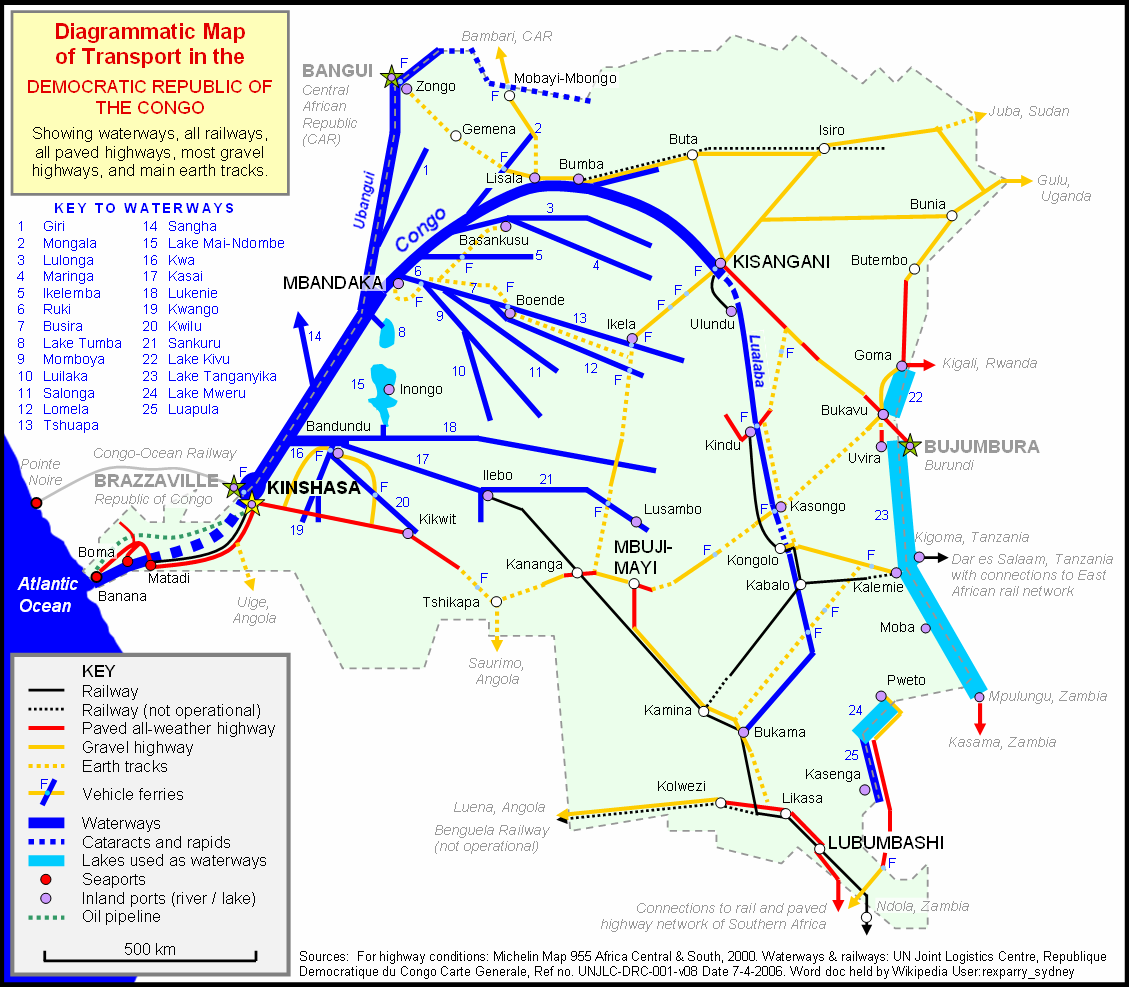
A diagrammatic map of ground and water transport in the DR Congo in 2000 (roads) and 2006 (waterways and railways)

Ground transport in the Democratic Republic of the Congo has always been problematic. Despite other countries being able to conquer terrain and climate similar to that of the Congo Basin it is chronic economic mismanagement and internal conflict that has led to serious under-investment over many years.

On the other hand, the DRC has thousands of kilometres of navigable waterways. Historically water transport has been the dominant means of moving around a large part of the country.

== Transport problems ==
As an illustration of transport difficulties in the DRC, even before wars damaged the infrastructure, the so-called "national" route, used to get supplies to Bukavu from the seaport of Matadi, consisted of the following:

- Matadi to Kinshasa – rail
- Kinshasa to Kisangani – river boat
- Kisangani to Ubundu – rail
- Ubundu to Kindu – river boat
- Kindu to Kalemie – rail
- Kalemie to Kalundu (the lake port at Uvira) – boat on Lake Tanganyika
- Kalundu to Bukavu – road

In other words, goods had to be loaded and unloaded eight times and the total journey would take many months.

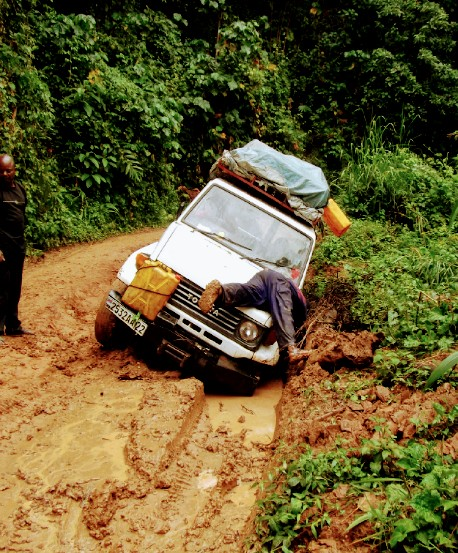
Truck stuck in the mud after a heavy rain

Many of the routes listed below are in poor condition and may be operating at only a fraction of their original capacity (if at all), despite recent attempts to make improvements. Up to 2006 the United Nations Joint Logistics Centre (UNJLC) had an operation in Congo to support humanitarian relief agencies working there, and its bulletins and maps about the transport situation are archived on ReliefWeb.

The First and Second Congo Wars saw great destruction of transport infrastructure from which the country has not yet recovered. Many vehicles were destroyed or commandeered by militias, especially in the north and east of the country, and the fuel supply system was also badly affected. Consequently, outside of Kinshasa, Matadi and Lubumbashi, private and commercial road transport is almost non-existent and traffic is scarce even where roads are in good condition. The few vehicles in use outside these cities are run by the United Nations, aid agencies, the DRC government, and a few larger companies such as those in the mining and energy sectors. High-resolution satellite photos on the Internet show large cities such as Bukavu, Butembo and Kikwit virtually devoid of traffic, compared to similar photos of towns in neighbouring countries.

Air transport is the only effective means of moving between many places within the country. The Congolese government, the United Nations, aid organisations and large companies use air rather than ground transport to move personnel and freight. The UN operates a large fleet of aircraft and helicopters, and compared to other African countries the DRC has a large number of small domestic airlines and air charter companies. The transport (and smuggling) of minerals with a high value for weight is also carried out by air, and in the east, some stretches of paved road isolated by destroyed bridges or impassable sections have been turned into airstrips.

For the ordinary citizen though, especially in rural areas, often the only options are to cycle, walk or go by dugout canoe.

Some parts of the DRC are more accessible from neighbouring countries than from Kinshasa. For example, Bukavu itself and Goma and other north-eastern towns are linked by paved road from the DRC border to the Kenyan port of Mombasa, and most goods for these cities have been brought via this route in recent years. Similarly, Lubumbashi and the rest of Katanga Province is linked to Zambia, through which the paved highway and rail networks of Southern Africa can be accessed. Such links through neighbouring countries are generally more important for the east and south-east of the country, and are more heavily used, than surface links to the capital.

== Major infrastructure programs ==
In 2007 China agreed to lend the DRC US$5bn for two major transport infrastructure projects to link mineral-rich Katanga, specifically Lubumbashi, by rail to an ocean port (Matadi) and by road to the Kisangani river port, and to improve its links to the transport network of Southern Africa in Zambia. The two projects would also link the major parts of the country not served by water transport, and the main centres of the economy. Loan repayments will be from concessions for raw materials which China desperately needs: copper, cobalt, gold and nickel, as well as by toll revenues from the road and railway. In the face of reluctance by the international business community to invest in DRC, this represents a revitalisation of DRC's infrastructure much needed by its government.

The China Railway Seventh Group Co. Ltd were in charge of the contract, under signed by the China Railway Engineering Corporation, with construction to be started from June 2008.

In July of 2025, the DRC signed a $257 million concession contract to revamp the 115 kilometre long Kisangani–Ubundu railway segment, expected for completion in 2028.

== Railways ==
Rail transport is provided in the Democratic Republic of the Congo by the Société Nationale des Chemins de Fer du Congo (SNCC), the Société commerciale des transports et des ports (SCTP) (previously Office National des Transports (ONATRA) until 2011), and the Office des Chemins de fer des Ueles (CFU). The national system is mostly operated by the Société Nationale des Chemins de Fer du Congo, SNCC. Not all rail lines link up, but they are generally connected by river transport.

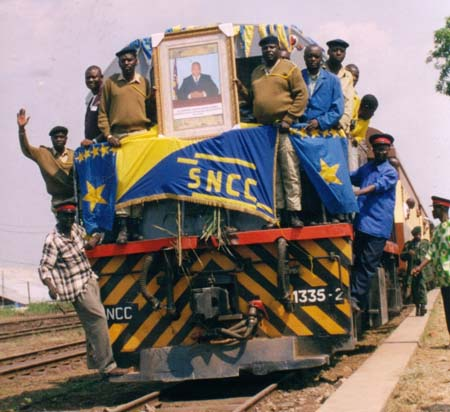
Train from Lubumbashi arriving in Kindu on newly refurbished line

== Highways ==
The Democratic Republic of the Congo has fewer all-weather paved highways than any country of its population and size in Africa — a total of 2250 km, of which only 1226 km is in good condition (see below). To put this in perspective, the road distance across the country in any direction is more than 2500 km (e.g. Matadi to Lubumbashi, 2700 km by road). The figure of 2250 km converts to 35 km of paved road per 1,000,000 of population. Comparative figures for Zambia and Botswana are 721 km and 3427 km respectively.

=== Categories ===
The road network is theoretically divided into four categories (national roads, priority regional roads, secondary regional roads and local roads), however, the United Nations Joint Logistics Centre (UNJLC) reports that this classification is of little practical use because some roads simply do not exist. For example, National Road 9 is not operational and cannot be detected by remote sensing methods.

The two principal highways are:

- National Road No. 1 connecting the Atlantic seaports with Kinshasa and southeast Katanga, the most important economic area of the country due to its copper and other mines.
- National Road No. 2, Mbuji-Mayi–Bukavu–Goma–Beni
- Note that the so-called Kinshasa Highway is not a physical road but a metaphor applied to the route by which AIDS is believed to have been spread east through Uganda and Kenya and neighbouring countries by truck drivers from the Congo. In the DR Congo the only highway which physically matches the route is National Road No. 2, and most passengers and freight moving between Kinshasa and that road go by boat along the Congo River.

=== Inventory ===
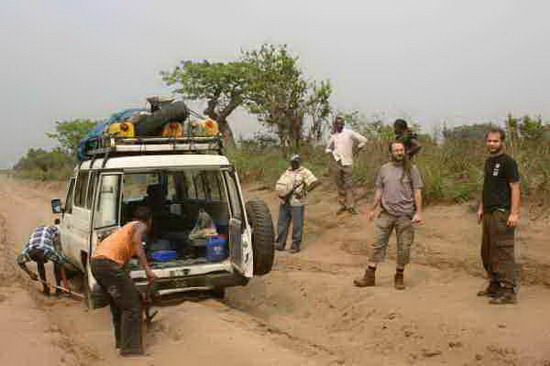
The road between Kikwit and Idiofa.

The total road network in 2005, according to the UNJLC, consisted of:

- paved: 2,801 km
- unpaved: 15,000 km
- tracks 43,000 km
- country roads 21,000 km
- local roads or footpaths 90,000 km
- total: 171,250 km

The UNJLC also points out that the pre-Second Congo War network no longer exists, and is dependent upon 20,000 bridges and 325 ferries, most of which are in need of repair or replacement. In contrast, a Democratic Republic of the Congo government document shows that, also in 2005, the network of main highways in good condition was as follows:

- paved: 1,226 km
- unpaved: 607 km

The 2000 Michelin Motoring and Tourist Map 955 of Southern and Central Africa, which categorizes roads as "surfaced", "improved" (generally unsurfaced but with gravel added and graded), "partially improved" and "earth roads" and "tracks" shows that there were 2694 km of paved highway in 2000. These figures indicate that, compared to the more recent figures above, there has been a deterioration this decade, rather than improvement.

=== International highways ===
Three routes in the Trans-African Highway network pass through DR Congo:

- Tripoli-Cape Town Highway: this route crosses the western extremity of the country on National Road No. 1 between Kinshasa and Matadi, a distance of 285 km on one of the only paved sections in fair condition.
- Lagos-Mombasa Highway: the DR Congo is the main missing link in this east–west highway and requires a new road to be constructed before it can function.
- Beira-Lobito Highway: this east–west highway crosses Katanga and requires re-construction over most of its length, being an earth track between the Angolan border and Kolwezi, a paved road in very poor condition between Kolwezi and Lubumbashi, and a paved road in fair condition over the short distance to the Zambian border.

== Waterways ==
The DRC has more navigable rivers and moves more passengers and goods by boat and ferry than any other country in Africa. Kinshasa, with 7 km of river frontage occupied by wharfs and jetties, is the largest inland waterways port on the continent. However, much of the infrastructure — vessels and port handling facilities — has, like the railways, suffered from poor maintenance and internal conflict.

The total length of waterways is estimated at 16,238 km including the Congo River, its tributaries, and unconnected lakes.

The 1000-kilometre Kinshasa-Kisangani route on the Congo River is the longest and best-known. It is operated by river tugs pushing several barges lashed together, and for the hundreds of passengers and traders these function like small floating towns. Rather than mooring at riverside communities along the route, traders come out by canoe and small boat alongside the river barges and transfer goods on the move.

Most waterway routes do not operate to regular schedules. It is common for an operator to moor a barge at a riverside town and collect freight and passengers over a period of weeks before hiring a river tug to tow or push the barge to its destination.

- Description of Inland Waterways in the Congo from the UN Joint Logistics Centre

=== International links via inland waterways ===
- Kinshasa is linked to Brazzaville (Republic of the Congo) by regular boat and ferry services 3.5 km across the Congo River.
- Kinshasa and other river ports via the Ubangui River to Bangui (Central African Republic).
- Goma and Bukavu on Lake Kivu to Gisenyi, Kibuye and Cyangugu in Rwanda.
- Kalemie, Kulundu-Uvira and Moba on Lake Tanganyika to Kigoma (Tanzania), Bujumbura (Burundi) and Mpulungu (Zambia).
- Kasenga and Pweto on the Luapula River-Lake Mweru system to Nchelenge, Kashikishi and Kashiba in Zambia.
- Lake Albert: two small ports on the DRC side, Kisenye near Bunia and Mahadi-Port in the north can link to Ugandan ports at Butiaba and Pakwach (served by Uganda Railways) on the Albert Nile, which is navigable as far as Nimule in southern Sudan. Water transport is conducted principally in small craft, and commercial water transport is relatively absent.
- Lake Edward: located within national parks, settlements are small, water transport is conducted principally in small craft, commercial water transport is absent.

=== Domestic links via inland waterways ===
The middle Congo River and its tributaries from the east are the principal domestic waterways in the DRC. The two principal river routes are:

- Kinshasa to Mbandaka and Kisangani on the River Congo
- Kinshasa to Ilebo on the Kasai River

See the diagrammatic transport map above for other river waterways.

The most-used domestic lake waterways are:

- Kalemie to Kalundu-Uvira on Lake Tanganyika
- Bukavu to Goma on Lake Kivu
- Fimi River to Inongo on Lake Mai-Ndombe
- Irebu on the Congo to Bikoro on Lake Tumba
- Kasenga to Pweto on the Luapula-Mweru system
- Kisenye to Mahadi-Port on Lake Albert.

Most large Congo river ferry boats were destroyed during the civil war. Only smaller boats are running and they are irregular.

=== Ports and harbors ===
==== Atlantic Ocean ====
- Matadi - largest port, and railhead for portage railway to Kinshasa - draft: 6.4 m
- Banana - oil terminal for pipeline to Kinshasa
- Boma - second-largest port

A new deep-water port is under construction at Banana, near the mouth of the Congo River, intended to give the country its first deep-sea port and reduce its reliance on ports in neighbouring states. Developed by DP World under a concession with the Congolese government, the first phase — a roughly US$350 million greenfield project with a 600-metre quay and an initial capacity of about 350,000 TEU per year — is being built by Mota-Engil.

==== Inland river ports ====
- Bumba
- Ilebo - railhead
- Kindu - railhead
- Kinshasa - railhead
- Kisangani - railhead
- Mbandaka
- N'dangi - former military harbor

==== Lake Tanganyika ====
- Kalemie - railhead
- Kalundu-Uvira
- Moba

==== Lake Kivu ====
- Bukavu
- Idjwi
- Goma

== Pipelines ==
petroleum products 390 km

== Merchant marine ==
1 petroleum tanker

== Airports ==
Due to the lack of roads, operating railroads and ferry transportation many people traveling around the country fly on aircraft. As of 2016 the country does not have an international passenger airline and relies on foreign-based airlines for international connections. Congo Airways provides domestic flights and are based at Kinshasa's N'djili Airport which serves as the country's main international airport. Lubumbashi International Airport in the country's south-east is also serviced by several international airlines.

=== Airports - with paved runways ===
total: 24
over 3,047 m: 4
2,438 to 3,047 m: 2
1,524 to 2,437 m: 16
914 to 1,523 m: 2 (2002 est.)

=== Airports - with unpaved runways ===
total: 205
1,524 to 2,437 m: 19
914 to 1,523 m: 95
under 914 m: 91 (2002 est.)

== Transport safety and incidents ==
All air carriers certified by the Democratic Republic of the Congo have been banned from operating at airports in the European Community by the European Commission because of inadequate safety standards.

=== 2010 ===
- Kasai River disaster. A passenger ferry capsized on the Kasai River in July with at least 80 dead.

=== 2008 ===
- 2008 Hewa Bora Airways crash - April 15, plane crash killed at least 18 people after taking off from the Goma International Airport, tearing the roofs off houses as it plowed through a densely populated marketplace near the runway.

=== 2007 ===
- August 1 train derailment killed 100, many riding on roof.

=== 2005 ===
- Kindu rail accident, on November 29, at least 60 people were killed

== See also ==
- Congo River
- Democratic Republic of the Congo
- Lake Chad replenishment project (possible waterway, proposed waterflow is the same waterflow 100 m^{3}/s as in the Moscow Canal).
