= List of airports by ICAO code: FN-FZ =

List of airports by ICAO code: A - B - C - D - EB-EG - EH-EY - FA-FM - FN-FZ - G - H - ~~I~~ - J - K - L - M - N - O - P - Q - R - S - T - U - V - W - ~~X~~ - Y - Z

The airports whose ICAO codes start with 'F' are in Central Africa, Southern Africa, and the Indian Ocean.

== FN – Angola ==
Also see airport category and list.

ICAO	IATA	Airport name	Community	Coordinates
FNAM	AZZ	Ambriz Airport	Ambriz	07°51′45″S 013°06′55″E
FNBC	SSY	Mbanza Congo Airport	Mbanza Congo	06°16′15″S 014°14′50″E
FNBG	BUG	Benguela Airport	Benguela	12°36′30″S 013°24′10″E
FNBJ	NBJ	Dr. Antonio Agostinho Neto International Airport	Luanda	09°02′48″S 013°30′26″E
FNBL	GGC	Lumbala Airport	Lumbala N'guimbo	14°06′18″S 021°27′00″E
FNCA	CAB	Cabinda Airport	Cabinda	05°35′50″S 012°11′17″E
FNCB		Camembe Airport	Camembe	08°07′05″S 014°30′00″E
FNCC		Cacolo Airport	Cacolo	10°06′35″S 019°17′10″E
FNCF	CFF	Cafunfo Airport	Cafunfo	08°47′00″S 017°59′25″E
FNCH	PGI	Chitato Airport	Chitato	07°21′25″S 020°48′10″E
FMCM		Camabatela Airport	Camabatela	08°10′40″S 015°23′00″E
FNCP	KNP	Kapanda Airport	Kapanda	09°46′15″S 015°27′25″E
FNCT	CBT	Catumbela Airport	Catumbela	12°28′45″S 013°29′15″E
FNCV	CTI	Cuito Cuanavale Airport	Cuito Cuanavale	15°09′35″S 019°09′20″E
FNCX		Camaxilo Airport	Camaxilo	08°22′25″S 018°55′25″E
FNCZ	CAV	Cazombo Airport	Cazombo	11°53′35″S 022°54′55″E
FNDB		Damba Airport	Damba	06°41′55″S 015°08′30″E
FNDU	DUE	Dundo Airport	Dundo	07°24′05″S 020°49′05″E
FNGI	VPE	Ondjiva Pereira Airport	Ondjiva	17°02′35″S 015°41′00″E
FNHU	NOV	Albano Machado Airport	Huambo	12°48′30″S 015°45′30″E
FNJM	JMB	Jamba Airport	Jamba	14°41′55″S 016°03′55″E
FNKU	SVP	Joaquim Kapango Airport	Cuíto	12°24′15″S 016°56′55″E
FNLB	LLT	Lobito Airport	Lobito	12°22′20″S 013°32′15″E
FNLK	LBZ	Lucapa Airport	Lucapa	08°26′30″S 020°43′55″E
FNLU	LAD	Quatro de Fevereiro Airport	Luanda	08°51′30″S 013°13′52″E
FNLZ	LZM	Cuango-Luzamba Airport	Cuango-Luzamba	09°06′55″S 018°03′00″E
FNMA	MEG	Malanje Airport	Malanje	09°31′30″S 016°18′45″E
FNME	SPP	Menongue Airport	Menongue	14°39′25″S 017°43′05″E
FNMO	MSZ	Welwitschia Mirabilis Airport	Moçâmedes	15°15′40″S 012°08′50″E
FNMQ		Maquela Airport	Maquela	06°01′45″S 015°08′10″E
FNNG	GXG	Negage Airport	Negage	07°45′15″S 015°17′15″E
FNNL		Huambo Airport	Huambo	12°47′11″S 015°46′28″E
FNPA	PBN	Porto Amboim Airport	Porto Amboim	10°43′20″S 013°45′50″E
FNPB		Sanza Pombo Airport	Sanza Pombo	07°17′20″S 015°55′50″E
FNSA	VHC	Saurimo Airport	Saurimo	09°41′20″S 020°25′55″E
FNSO	SZA	Soyo Airport	Soyo	06°08′28″S 012°22′19″E
FNSU	NDD	Sumbe Airport	Sumbe	11°10′05″S 013°50′50″E
FNTO		Xamindele Airport	Toto	07°08′45″S 014°14′55″E
FNUA	UAL	Luau Airport	Luau	10°42′55″S 022°13′50″E
FNUB	SDD	Lubango Airport	Lubango	14°55′30″S 013°34′30″E
FNUE	LUO	Luena Airport	Luena	11°46′05″S 019°53′50″E
FNUG	UGO	Uige Airport	Uíge	07°36′10″S 015°01′40″E
FNWK	CEO	Waco Kungo Airport	Waco Kungo	11°25′35″S 015°06′05″E
FNXA	XGN	Xangongo Airport	Xangongo	16°45′20″S 014°57′55″E
FNZE	ARZ	N'zeto Airport	N'zeto	07°15′25″S 012°51′50″E
FNZG	NZA	Nzagi Airport	Nzagi	07°43′00″S 021°21′25″E

== FO – Gabon ==
Also see airport category and list.

ICAO	IATA	Airport name	Community	Coordinates	Notes
FOGA		Akieni Airport	Akieni	01°08′23″S 013°54′13″E	
FOGB	BGB	Booué Airport	Booué	00°06′25″S 011°56′35″E	
FOGE	KDN	Ndendé Airport	Ndendé	02°24′20″S 011°21′40″E	
FOGF	FOU	Fougamou Airport	Fougamou	01°16′40″S 010°36′45″E	
FOGG	MBC	Mbigou Airport	Mbigou	01°53′35″S 011°54′45″E	
FOGI	MGX	Moabi Airport	Moabi	02°27′15″S 010°56′00″E	
FOGJ		Ndjolé Airport	Ndjolé	00°11′13″S 010°45′43″E	
FOGK	KOU	Mabimbi Airport	Koulamoutou	01°11′05″S 012°26′29″E	
FOGM	MJL	Mouila (City) Airport	Mouila	01°50′43″S 011°03′24″E	
FOGO	OYE	Oyem Airport	Oyem	01°32′30″N 011°34′50″E	
FOGQ	OKN	Okondja Airport	Okondja	00°40′00″S 013°40′25″E	
FOGR	LBQ	Lambaréné Airport	Lambaréné	00°42′15″S 010°14′45″E	
FOGV	MVX	Minvoul Airport	Minvoul	02°09′09″N 012°06′29″E	
FOGX	GAX	Gamba Airport	Gamba	02°47′07″S 010°02′50″E	
FOOB	BMM	Bitam Airport	Bitam	02°04′32″N 011°29′36″E	
FOOC		Cocobeach Airport	Cocobeach	00°58′55″N 009°34′20″E	Closed
FOOD	MFF	Moanda Airport	Moanda	01°31′37″S 013°15′04″E	
FOOE	MKB	Mékambo Airport	Mékambo	00°58′40″N 013°58′05″E	
FOOG	POG	Port-Gentil International Airport	Port-Gentil	00°42′45″S 008°45′15″E	
FOOH	OMB	Omboué Hospital Airport	Omboué	01°34′29″S 009°15′46″E	
FOOI	IGE	Tchongorove Airport	Iguela	01°55′10″S 009°18′50″E	
FOOK	MKU	Makokou Airport	Makokou	00°34′45″N 012°53′25″E	
FOOL	LBV	Leon M'Ba International Airport	Libreville	00°27′31″N 009°24′44″E	
FOOM	MZC	Mitzic Airport	Mitzic	00°46′40″N 011°33′10″E	Closed
FOON	MVB	M'Vengue El Hadj Omar Bongo Ondimba International Airport	Franceville	01°39′22″S 013°26′17″E	
FOOR	LTL	Lastourville Airport	Lastourville	00°49′30″S 012°44′55″E	
FOOS	ZKM	Setté Cama Airport	Setté Cama	02°32′20″S 009°45′55″E	
FOOT	TCH	Tchibanga Airport	Tchibanga	02°53′15″S 010°57′20″E	
FOOY	MYB	Mayumba Airport	Mayumba	03°27′30″S 010°40′35″E	

== FP – São Tomé and Príncipe ==
Also see airport category and list.

ICAO	IATA	Airport name	Community	Coordinates	Notes
FPPA	PGP	Porto Alegre Airport	São Tomé	00°02′00″N 006°31′00″E	Closed
FPPR	PCP	Príncipe Airport	Príncipe	01°39′46″N 007°24′42″E	
FPST	TMS	São Tomé International Airport (Salazar Airport)	São Tomé	00°22′41″N 006°42′44″E	

== FQ – Mozambique ==
Also see airport category and list.

ICAO	IATA	Airport name	Community	Coordinates
FQAG	ANO	Angoche Airport	Angoche	16°10′55″S 039°56′41″E
FQBI		Bilene Airport	Bilene	25°15′58″S 033°14′19″E
FQBR	BEW	Beira Airport	Beira	19°47′47″S 034°54′27″E
FQCB	FXO	Cuamba Airport	Cuamba	14°49′03″S 036°31′42″E
FQCH	VPY	Chimoio Airport	Chimoio	19°08′55″S 033°25′45″E
FQES		Estima Air Base		15°44′02″S 032°45′23″E
FQFU		Furancungo Airport	Furancungo	15°44′02″S 032°45′23″E
FQIA	IHC	Inhaca Airport	Inhaca	25°59′52″S 032°55′45″E
FQIN	INH	Inhambane Airport	Inhambane	23°52′35″S 035°24′30″E
FQLC	VXC	Lichinga Airport	Lichinga	13°16′26″S 035°15′58″E
FQLU	LFB	Lumbo Airport	Lumbo	15°01′59″S 040°40′18″E
FQMA	MPM	Maputo International Airport	Maputo	25°55′15″S 032°34′21″E
FQMD	MUD	Mueda Airport	Mueda	11°40′22″S 039°33′47″E
FQMP	MZB	Mocímboa da Praia Airport	Mocímboa da Praia	11°21′42″S 040°21′17″E
FQMR		Marrupa Airport	Marrupa	13°13′30″S 037°33′07″E
FQNC	MNC	Nacala Airport	Nacala	14°29′17″S 040°42′44″E
FQNP	APL	Nampula Airport	Nampula	15°06′20″S 039°16′54″E
FQPB	POL	Pemba Airport	Pemba	12°59′12″S 040°31′20″E
FQPO	PDD	Ponta do Ouro Airport	Ponta do Ouro	26°49′36″S 032°50′18″E
FQQL	UEL	Quelimane Airport	Quelimane	17°51′19″S 036°52′08″E
FQSG		Songo Airport	Songo	15°36′09″S 032°46′23″E
FQTT	TET	Chingozi Airport	Tete	16°06′17″S 033°38′24″E
FQUG		Ulongwe Airport	Ulongwe	14°42′16″S 034°21′08″E
FQVL	VNX	Vilankulo Airport	Vilankulo	22°01′06″S 035°18′48″E
FQXA	VJB	Xai-Xai Chongoene Airport	Xai-Xai	25°02′16″S 033°37′38″E

== FS – Seychelles ==
Also see airport category and list.

ICAO	IATA	Airport name	Community	Coordinates
FSAL		Alphonse Airport	Alphonse Island	07°00′17″S 052°43′34″E
FSAS		Assumption Island Airport	Assumption Island	09°44′32″S 046°30′24″E
FSDA		D'Arros Airport	D'Arros Island	05°25′00″S 053°17′45″E
FSDR	DES	Desroches Airport	Desroches Island (Île Desroches)	05°41′45″S 053°39′15″E
FSFA		Farquhar Airport	Farquhar Islands	10°06′35″S 051°10′35″E
FSIA	SEZ	Seychelles International Airport	Mahé Island	04°40′28″S 055°31′19″E
FSMA		Marie Louise Airport	Marie Louise Island	06°10′40″S 053°08′45″E
FSPL		Platte Airport	Platte Island (Île Platte)	05°51′50″S 055°23′05″E
FSPP	PRI	Praslin Island Airport	Praslin Island	04°19′09″S 055°41′30″E
FSSA		Astove Island Airport	Astove Island	10°03′40″S 047°45′00″E
FSSB	BDI	Bird Island Airport	Bird Island	03°43′25″S 055°12′22″E
FSSC		Coëtivy Airport	Coëtivy Island	07°08′00″S 056°16′35″E
FSSD	DEI	Denis Island Airport	Denis Island	03°48′05″S 055°40′00″E
FSSF	FRK	Frégate Island Airport	Frégate Island	04°35′00″S 055°56′44″E
FSSR		Remire Airport	Remire Island (Eagle Island)	05°07′00″S 053°18′42″E

== FT – Chad ==
Also see airport category and list.

ICAO	IATA	Airport name	Community	Coordinates
FTAA		Amdjarass Airport	Amdjarass	15°58′42″N 022°46′22″E
FTTA	SRH	Sarh Airport	Sarh	09°09′04″N 018°22′46″E
FTTB	OGR	Bongor Airport	Bongor	10°17′17″N 015°22′48″E
FTTC	AEH	Abéché Airport	Abéché	14°40′50″N 020°50′56″E
FTTD	MQQ	Moundou Airport	Moundou	08°37′13″N 016°04′06″E
FTTE		Biltine Airport	Biltine	14°31′24″N 020°54′37″E
FTTF		Fada Airport	Fada	17°11′18″N 021°30′42″E
FTTG		Goz Beïda Airport	Goz Beïda	12°12′42″N 021°27′30″E
FTTH	LTC	Laï Airport	Laï	09°23′53″N 016°18′45″E
FTTI	ATV	Ati Airport	Ati	13°14′22″N 018°18′47″E
FTTJ	NDJ	N'Djamena International Airport	N'Djamena	12°07′30″N 015°01′29″E
FTTK	BKR	Bokoro Airport	Bokoro	12°23′07″N 017°04′15″E
FTTL	OTC	Bol-Bérim Airport	Bol	13°26′36″N 014°44′21″E
FTTM	MVO	Mongo Airport	Mongo	12°10′12″N 018°40′31″E
FTTN	AMC	Am-Timan Airport	Am-Timan	11°02′06″N 020°16′29″E
FTTP	PLF	Pala Airport	Pala	09°22′47″N 014°55′32″E
FTTR		Zouar Airport	Zouar	20°26′55″N 016°34′16″E
FTTS	OUT	Bousso Airport	Bousso	10°29′29″N 016°43′13″E
FTTU	AMO	Mao Airport	Mao	14°08′46″N 015°18′51″E
FTTY	FYT	Faya-Largeau Airport	Faya-Largeau	17°54′58″N 019°06′32″E
FTTZ		Bardaï-Zougra Airport	Bardaï	21°26′57″N 017°03′21″E

== FV – Zimbabwe ==
Also see airport category and list.

ICAO	IATA	Airport name	Community	Coordinates	Notes
FVAB		Aberdeen Airport		18°11′42″S 032°40′31″E	
FVAE		Braebourne Airport		16°40′01″S 031°13′59″E	
FVBB		Beitbridge Airport		22°11′51″S 030°00′46″E	
FVBI		Binga Airport		17°38′51″S 027°19′01″E	
FVBL		Mabalauta Airport		21°55′04″S 031°27′25″E	
FVBM		Bumi Hills Airport		16°49′01″S 028°21′00″E	
FVBO		Bosbury Airport		18°12′09″S 030°05′31″E	Closed
FVBU	BUQ	Joshua Mqabuko Nkomo International Airport	Bulawayo	20°01′03″S 028°37′04″E	
FVCC		C.C. Strip Airport		17°25′57″S 030°17′54″E	
FVCD		Chirundu Airport		15°59′53″S 028°53′54″E	
FVCE		Cellina Airport		17°31′01″S 030°51′00″E	
FVCH	CHJ	Chipinge Airport	Chipinge	20°12′25″S 032°37′45″E	
FVCM		Cam+Motor Airport		18°18′00″S 029°58′46″E	
FVCN		Centenary Airport		16°44′02″S 031°07′15″E	
FVCP		Charles Prince Airport	Harare	17°45′05″S 030°55′30″E	
FVCR		Chizarira Airport		17°41′00″S 027°52′04″E	
FVCV		Chivu Airport		19°01′59″S 030°54′00″E	
FVCZ	BFO	Buffalo Range Airport	Chiredzi	21°00′29″S 031°34′43″E	
FVDA		Dawsons Airport		17°00′18″S 030°53′46″E	Closed
FVDE		Deka Airport		18°05′34″S 026°42′50″E	
FVDU		Dudley Airport		18°16′59″S 031°28′59″E	
FVED		Eduan Airport		18°46′12″S 029°47′15″E	Closed
FVFA	VFA	Victoria Falls Airport	Victoria Falls	18°05′45″S 025°50′20″E	
FVFG		Fothergill Airport		16°42′17″S 028°39′23″E	
FVFI		Filabusi Airport		20°32′09″S 029°15′19″E	Closed
FVGD		Gwanda Airport		20°53′57″S 029°00′03″E	
FVGM		Mhangura Airport		16°54′37″S 030°14′32″E	Closed
FVGO		Gowke Airport		18°14′19″S 028°57′58″E	
FVGR		Grand Reef Airport	Mutare	18°58′35″S 032°27′00″E	
FVGT		Gaths Mine Airport		19°59′41″S 030°30′08″E	
FVGW		Gweru Airport		19°32′58″S 029°44′07″E	
FVHP		Home Park Airport		18°11′33″S 031°44′07″E	
FVHY		Hippo Valley Airport		21°02′57″S 031°39′29″E	
FVIN		Induna Airport		20°04′57″S 028°42′46″E	Closed
FVIT		Itafa Airport		18°18′00″S 029°52′59″E	
FVKB	KAB	Kariba Airport	Kariba	16°31′11″S 028°53′06″E	
FVKK		Kwekwe East Airport		19°00′40″S 030°01′35″E	
FVKW		Mkwasine Airport		20°47′28″S 031°48′47″E	
FVKZ		Kezi Airport		20°55′01″S 028°28′59″E	Closed
FVLA		Langford Airport		17°55′59″S 030°57′00″E	Closed
FVLG		Longuiel Airport		17°00′00″S 029°37′59″E	Closed
FVLS		Lonestar Ranch Airport		21°03′41″S 031°53′21″E	
FVMA		Marondera Airport		18°11′15″S 031°28′10″E	
FVMB		Mashumbi Airport		16°10′23″S 030°33′48″E	
FVMD		Mount Darwin Airport		16°46′10″S 031°33′35″E	
FVMF		Mabikwa Airport		18°44′42″S 027°32′49″E	
FVMK		Mkonono Airport		17°43′01″S 030°25′01″E	
FVMN		Mana Pools Airport		15°46′07″S 029°23′08″E	
FVMS		Middle Sabi Airport		20°12′53″S 032°22′36″E	
FVMT		Mutoko Airport	Mutoko	17°25′55″S 032°11′00″E	
FVMU	UTA	Mutare Airport	Mutare	18°59′50″S 032°37′40″E	
FVMV	MVZ	Masvingo Airport	Masvingo	20°03′20″S 030°51′30″E	
FVMW		Murewa Airport		17°39′00″S 031°42′00″E	Closed
FVNY		Nyanyadzi Airport		19°43′31″S 032°25′33″E	
FVOT		Kotwa Airport	Kotwa	16°59′05″S 032°40′20″E	
FVPL		Plumtree Airport		20°29′11″S 027°47′23″E	Closed
FVRA		Ratelshoek Airport		20°14′04″S 032°47′51″E	
FVRE		Renroc Airport		16°58′01″S 029°34′01″E	Closed
FVRG	HRE	Robert Gabriel Mugabe International Airport	Harare	17°55′55″S 031°05′34″E	Formerly FVHA
FVRT		Rutenga Airport		21°13′48″S 030°44′32″E	Closed
FVRU		Rusape Airport		18°31′58″S 032°07′58″E	Closed
FVSE		Sanyati Estate Airport		17°58′26″S 029°13′36″E	
FVSH		Zvishavane Airport	Zvishavane	20°17′22″S 030°05′18″E	
FVSN		Sun Yet Sen Airport		21°19′59″S 028°31′01″E	Closed
FVSV		Spray View Airport		17°55′01″S 025°49′01″E	Closed
FVSX		Sengwa Gorge Airport		18°10′01″S 028°51′00″E	Closed
FVSY		Siyalima Airport		16°37′59″S 030°39′00″E	Closed
FVTA		Tashinga Airport		16°49′27″S 028°26′36″E	
FVTD		Tinfields Airport		19°56′30″S 031°25′33″E	
FVTE		Tengwe Airport		17°07′01″S 029°37′01″E	Closed
FVTJ		Tonje Airport		20°19′01″S 032°21′00″E	Closed
FVTL	GWE	Gweru-Thornhill Air Base	Gweru	19°26′11″S 029°51′43″E	
FVTS		Tsholothso Airport		19°45′59″S 027°46′04″E	Closed
FVTU		Tuli Airport		21°56′07″S 029°11′47″E	
FVWD		Wedza Airport		18°37′01″S 031°34′59″E	Closed
FVWN	HWN	Hwange National Park Airport	Hwange National Park	18°37′45″S 027°01′15″E	
FVWT	WKI	Hwange Town Airport	Hwange	18°21′45″S 026°31′10″E	
FVYT		Inyati Airport		19°42′00″S 028°51′00″E	Closed
FVZC		Zisco Airport		19°01′43″S 029°43′19″E	
FVZK		Zaka Airport		20°20′08″S 031°27′07″E	

== FW – Malawi ==
Also see airport category and list.

ICAO	IATA	Airport name	Community	Coordinates	Notes
FWBG		Bangula Airport		16°34′42″S 035°06′58″E	
FWCB		Chilumba Airport		10°26′21″S 034°14′46″E	
FWCD	CEH	Chelinda Airport	Chelinda	10°33′25″S 033°47′55″E	
FWCL	BLZ	Chileka International Airport	Blantyre	15°40′52″S 034°58′18″E	
FWCM	CMK	Club Makokola Airport	Club Makokola	14°18′23″S 035°07′53″E	
FWCS		Ntchisi Airport	Ntchisi	13°22′35″S 033°51′55″E	
FWCT		Chitipa Airport	Chitipa	09°42′00″S 033°16′00″E	
FWDW	DWA	Dwanga Airport	Dwanga	12°31′06″S 034°07′55″E	
FWDZ		Dedza Airport		14°22′59″S 034°19′01″E	Closed
FWKA	KGJ	Karonga Airport	Karonga	09°57′12″S 033°53′34″E	
FWKB		Katumbi Airport	Katumbi	10°49′40″S 033°30′30″E	Closed
FWKG	KBQ	Kasungu Airport	Kasungu	13°00′52″S 033°28′06″E	
FWKI	LLW	Kamuzu International Airport	Lilongwe	13°47′21″S 033°46′51″E	
FWKK		Nkhotakhota/Tangole Airport		12°55′22″S 034°16′53″E	Closed
FWLE		Old Lilongwe Airport		13°57′58″S 033°42′06″E	
FWLK	LIX	Likoma Airport	Likoma	12°04′33″S 034°44′14″E	
FWLP		Lifupa Airport	Kasungu	13°03′00″S 033°09′00″E	
FWMC		Mchinji Airport	Mchinji	13°48′20″S 032°53′38″E	
FWMG	MAI	Mangochi Airport	Mangochi	14°29′20″S 035°15′45″E	Closed
FWMK]		Mvuu Camp Airport		14°50′19″S 035°18′06″E	
FWMY	MYZ	Monkey Bay Airport	Monkey Bay	14°05′00″S 034°55′11″E	
FWMZ		Mzimba Airport		11°54′21″S 033°35′59″E	
FWNB		Ngabu Airport		16°29′54″S 034°51′51″E	Closed
FWSJ		Nsanje Airport	Nsanje	16°55′10″S 035°15′10″E	
FWSM	LMB	Salima Airport	Salima	13°45′25″S 034°35′05″E	
FWSU		Sucoma Airport	Nchalo	16°16′05″S 034°52′35″E	
FWTK		Mtakataka Airport		14°12′58″S 034°32′02″E	
FWUU	ZZU	Mzuzu Airport	Mzuzu	11°26′41″S 034°00′42″E	
FWZA		Zomba Airport	Zomba	15°23′10″S 035°23′05″E	

== FX – Lesotho ==
Also see airport category and list.

ICAO	IATA	Airport name	Community	Coordinates	Notes
FXBB		Bobete Airport	Bobete	29°25′30″S 028°40′04″E	
FXKA		Katse Airport	Katse Dam	29°21′49″S 028°31′38″E	
FXKB		Kolberg Airport	Letlapeng	29°22′42″S 028°29′32″E	
FXKY		Kuebunyane Airport	Kuebunyane	29°53′05″S 028°21′40″E	
FXLK	LEF	Lebakeng Airport	Lebakeng	29°53′27″S 028°39′20″E	
FXLR	LRB	Leribe Airport	Leribe	28°51′20″S 028°03′10″E	
FXLS	LES	Lesobeng Airport	Lesobeng	29°45′20″S 028°21′25″E	
FXLT		Letseng Airport	Letseng	29°00′35″S 028°51′25″E	
FXMA	MSG	Matsaile Airport	Matsaile	29°50′25″S 028°46′35″E	
FXMF	MFC	Mafeteng Airport	Mafeteng	29°48′05″S 027°14′40″E	
FXMH		Mohale's Hoek Airport	Mohale's Hoek	30°08′40″S 027°28′15″E	
FXMK	MKH	Mokhotlong Airport	Mokhotlong	29°16′50″S 029°04′15″E	
FXML		Malefiloane Airport	Malefiloane	29°20′00″S 029°11′30″E	
FXMM	MSU	Moshoeshoe I International Airport	Maseru	29°27′44″S 027°33′09″E	
FXMN		Mantsonyane Airport	Mantšonyane	29°32′40″S 028°16′13″E	
FXMP		Mohlanapeng Airport	Mohlanapeng	29°34′58″S 028°40′35″E	
FXMS		Mashai Store Airport		29°40′41″S 028°48′18″E	
FXMT		Matabeng Store Airport		29°48′50″S 028°48′32″E	
FXMU		Mejametalana Airport	Maseru	29°18′14″S 027°30′12″E	
FXMV		Matabeng Village Airport		29°48′53″S 028°48′30″E	
FXNH		Nohana Airport	Nohana	30°04′00″S 027°52′00″E	
FXNK	NKU	Nkaus Airport	Nkaus	30°01′17″S 028°11′50″E	
FXPG	PEL	Pelaneng Airport	Pelaneng	29°05′17″S 028°29′50″E	
FXQG	UTG	Quthing Airport	Quthing	30°24′26″S 027°41′35″E	
FXQN	UNE	Qacha's Nek Airport	Qacha's Nek	30°06′40″S 028°40′20″E	
FXSE		Sehlabathebe Airport	Sehlabathebe	29°54′58″S 029°02′25″E	
FXSH		Sehonghong Airport	Sehonghong	29°43′51″S 028°46′08″E	
FXSK	SKQ	Sekake Airport	Sekake	30°02′20″S 028°22′13″E	
FXSM	SOK	Semonkong Airport	Semonkong	29°50′20″S 028°03′30″E	
FXSS		Seshutes Airport	Seshote	29°15′55″S 028°33′20″E	
FXST		Saint Theresa Airport		29°37′01″S 028°46′59″E	Closed
FXTA	THB	Thaba-Tseka Airport	Thaba-Tseka	29°31′22″S 028°37′00″E	
FXTB		Tebellong Airport	Tebellong	30°03′05″S 028°27′35″E	
FXTK	TKO	Tlokoeng Airport	Tlokoeng	29°14′05″S 028°53′05″E	

== FY – Namibia ==
Also see airport category and list.

ICAO	IATA	Airport name	Community	Coordinates	Notes
FYAA		Ai-Ais Airport		27°59′42″S 017°35′48″E	
FYAB		Aroab B Airport		26°46′34″S 019°37′59″E	
FYAD		Aandster Airport		25°21′19″S 016°06′18″E	
FYAG		Anib Lodge Airport		24°26′05″S 018°06′16″E	
FYAH		Okombahe Airport		21°17′46″S 015°23′47″E	
FYAI		Ameib Ranch Airport		21°49′05″S 015°37′14″E	
FYAK		Aussenkehr Airport		28°27′31″S 017°27′52″E	
FYAL		Auob Lodge Airport		24°49′20″S 018°45′44″E	
FYAM		Aminuis Airport		23°39′21″S 019°21′06″E	
FYAN		Aranos Airport		24°07′42″S 019°06′53″E	
FYAR	ADI	Arandis Airport	Arandis	22°27′44″S 014°58′48″E	
FYAS		Aussenkehr Airport		26°40′05″S 016°17′35″E	
FYAT		Autabib Airport		23°00′34″S 017°41′11″E	
FYAV		Ariamsvlei Airport		28°07′38″S 019°50′16″E	
FYBB		Beenbreek Airport		23°28′29″S 017°56′53″E	
FYBC		Bethanien Airport	Bethanien	26°32′45″S 017°10′55″E	
FYBE		Betesda Airport		24°37′07″S 015°59′52″E	
FYBI		Arabi Hunting Farm Airport		24°37′07″S 015°59′52″E	
FYBJ		Bitterwasser Lodge Airport		23°52′30″S 017°59′28″E	
FYBK		Brukkaros Airport		25°41′58″S 018°03′11″E	
FYBM		B2Gold Otjikoto Mine Airport		19°59′32″S 017°07′40″E	
FYBO		Blumfelde Airport		23°33′00″S 018°19′24″E	
FYBR		Berseba Airport		25°58′56″S 017°50′22″E	
FYBT		Buitepos Airport		22°16′00″S 019°59′57″E	
FYBY		Byseewah Airport		19°36′29″S 015°25′49″E	
FYCC		Cape Cross Airport		21°45′45″S 013°59′28″E	
FYCV		Cordova Airport		21°43′59″S 018°31′17″E	
FYDC		Damaraland Wilderness Camp Airport		20°25′54″S 014°07′38″E	
FYDN		Doro Nawas Airport		20°27′04″S 014°17′14″E	
FYEA		Etendeka Airport		19°48′11″S 013°55′41″E	
FYEF		Epupa Falls Airport		17°01′46″S 013°12′37″E	
FYEG		Erongo Mountain Ombu Airport		21°40′04″S 015°40′16″E	
FYEH		Ehomba Airport		17°29′17″S 013°50′13″E	
FYEK		Epukiro Airport		21°47′12″S 019°06′22″E	
FYEM		Emeritus Airport		22°53′34″S 015°42′05″E	
FYEN		Eenhana Airport	Eenhana	17°28′59″S 016°19′19″E	
FYEP		Epacha Airport		19°25′46″S 015°40′37″E	
FYER		Ermo Game Farm Airport		19°17′47″S 014°33′43″E	
FYET		Etusis Lodge Airport		22°10′46″S 015°45′21″E	
FYGB		Gobabis Airport		22°30′20″S 018°58′30″E	
FYGC		Gochas Airport		24°51′23″S 018°49′04″E	
FYGF	GFY	Grootfontein Air Force Base	Grootfontein	19°36′07″S 018°07′21″E	
FYGK		Farm Whitwater East Airport		24°37′48″S 015°56′21″E	
FYGL		Omaruru Game Lodge Airport		21°19′34″S 016°05′22″E	
FYGO		Gobabeb Airport		23°32′39″S 015°02′42″E	
FYGT		Gross Tsaub Airport		20°01′40″S 015°03′59″E	
FYGV		Gravenstein Airport		23°27′32″S 017°29′52″E	
FYHC		Hilker's Cheetahdrome Airport		20°28′53″S 017°02′37″E	
FYHH		Helmeringhausen Airstrip	Helmeringhausen	25°51′49″S 016°48′59″E	
FYHI	HAL	Halali Airport	Halali	19°01′50″S 016°27′30″E	
FYHM		Hammerstein Airport		24°53′18″S 016°11′52″E	
FYHN		Henties Bay Airport		22°06′12″S 014°18′09″E	
FYHO		Hoanib Airport		19°23′11″S 013°07′58″E	
FYHS		Hobas Airport		27°37′28″S 017°41′36″E	Closed
FYHV		Hartmann Valley Airport		17°22′38″S 012°15′17″E	
FYIA		Intu Africa Pan Airport		24°05′18″S 017°57′06″E	
FYKA		Karibib Air Force Base		21°50′52″S 015°54′10″E	
FYKB	KAS	Karasburg Airport	Karasburg	28°02′00″S 018°44′00″E	
FYKD		Kalkfeld Airport		20°54′05″S 016°12′28″E	
FYKE		Kalahari Game Lodge Airport		25°39′04″S 019°52′41″E	
FYKJ		Kamanjab Airport		19°31′15″S 014°49′25″E	
FYKM	MPA	Katima Mulilo Airport	Katima Mulilo	17°38′00″S 024°10′50″E	Formerly FYMP
FYKN		Okonjima Airport		20°52′01″S 016°38′22″E	
FYKR		Okorusu Mine Airport		20°03′45″S 016°43′32″E	
FYKS		Koes Airport		25°56′04″S 019°06′55″E	
FYKT	KMP	Keetmanshoop Airport	Keetmanshoop	26°32′15″S 018°06′40″E	
FYKU		Kuidas Airport		20°39′00″S 013°51′36″E	
FYKW		Okangwati Airport		17°26′19″S 013°16′42″E	
FYKX		Khorixas Airport		20°21′58″S 015°03′33″E	
FYKY		Uitkyk Airport		25°07′19″S 016°15′57″E	
FYKZ		Kuzikus Airport		23°13′46″S 018°23′12″E	
FYLO		Lodge Okajo Airport		21°43′40″S 016°11′45″E	
FYLR		La Rochelle Airport		18°58′44″S 017°51′41″E	
FYLS		Lianshulu Lodge Airport		18°06′59″S 023°23′36″E	
FYLV		Leonardville Airport		23°30′54″S 018°47′22″E	
FYLW		Langverwacht Airport		25°00′01″S 018°31′58″E	
FYLZ	LUD	Lüderitz Airport	Lüderitz	26°41′15″S 015°14′35″E	
FYMB		Meob Bay Airport		24°37′02″S 014°41′50″E	
FYME		Mount Etjo Airport		21°01′23″S 016°27′10″E	
FYMG		Midgard Airport		22°00′38″S 017°22′12″E	
FYMH		Maltahoehe Airport		24°46′14″S 016°58′40″E	
FYMI		Mile 72 Airport		21°52′13″S 014°04′45″E	
FYMK		Kunene Mouth Airport		17°16′15″S 011°45′46″E	
FYML		Mariental Airport		24°36′20″S 017°55′30″E	
FYMM		Omatako Hunting Airport		21°32′34″S 016°47′55″E	
FYMO	OKU	Mokuti Lodge Airport	Mokuti Lodge	18°48′30″S 017°03′00″E	
FYMP		Okamapu Airport		21°44′45″S 017°53′14″E	
FYMW		Moewe Bay Airport		19°23′21″S 012°44′38″E	
FYNA	NNI	Namutoni Airport	Namutoni	18°48′40″S 016°55′30″E	
FYNB		Kansimba Airport		22°02′40″S 016°10′44″E	
FYNG		Ongava Lodge Airport		19°19′43″S 015°54′54″E	
FYNP		Nepara Airfield	Nkurenkuru	17°46′04″S 018°27′07″E	Closed
FYOA	OND	Andimba Toivo ya Toivo Airport	Ondangwa	17°52′41″S 015°57′09″E	
FYOE	OMG	Omega Airport	Omega	18°01′45″S 022°11′20″E	
FYOG	OMD	Oranjemund Airport	Oranjemund	28°35′05″S 016°26′45″E	
FYOH		Okahao Airport	Okahao	17°52′52″S 015°04′34″E	
FYOJ		Outjo Airport		20°04′40″S 016°07′30″E	
FYOM		Omaruru Airport		21°24′54″S 015°56′17″E	
FYON		Okahandja Airport		22°00′50″S 016°53′51″E	
FYOO	OKF	Okaukuejo Airport	Okaukuejo	19°09′00″S 015°55′00″E	
FYOP	OPW	Opuwa Airport	Opuwa	18°03′20″S 013°51′10″E	
FYOS	OHI	Oshakati Airport	Oshakati	17°47′50″S 015°42′00″E	Closed
FYOU		Operet Airport		18°36′34″S 017°08′59″E	
FYOW		Otjiwarongo Airport		20°25′50″S 016°39′45″E	
FYPO		Pokweni Glider Airport		23°39′07″S 017°43′42″E	
FYRC		Ruacana Airport		17°25′20″S 014°22′30″E	
FYRF		Rietfontein Airport		26°43′44″S 020°02′00″E	
FYRH		Rehoboth Oanob Resort Airport		23°18′49″S 017°02′31″E	
FYRP		Rosh Pinah Airport		27°57′51″S 016°45′14″E	Closed
FYRR		Rag Rock Airport		20°32′11″S 014°25′42″E	
FYRU	NDU	Rundu Airport	Rundu	17°57′20″S 019°43′25″E	
FYSA		Skorpion Mine Airport		27°52′35″S 016°38′52″E	
FYSF		Sesfontein Airport		19°06′07″S 013°38′52″E	
FYSI		Ndonga Linena Airport		17°59′00″S 020°32′05″E	
FYSL		Sossusvlei Mountain Lodge Airport		24°48′12″S 015°53′28″E	
FYSM	SWP	Swakopmund Airport	Swakopmund	22°39′30″S 014°34′00″E	
FYSN		Osona Airport		22°06′28″S 016°58′47″E	
FYSO		Solitaire Airport		23°54′03″S 016°00′17″E	
FYSP		Stampriet Pan Airport		24°21′08″S 018°26′00″E	
FYSS		Sesriem Airport		24°30′46″S 015°44′48″E	
FYST		Strate Airport		23°58′04″S 018°32′56″E	
FYTE		Terrace Bay Airport		19°58′20″S 013°01′32″E	
FYTF		Twyfelfontein Airport		20°32′39″S 014°21′32″E	
FYTK		Tsumkwe Airport		19°35′00″S 020°27′00″E	
FYTM	TSB	Tsumeb Airport	Tsumeb	19°15′40″S 017°43′50″E	
FYUS		Uis Mine Airport		21°13′48″S 014°52′01″E	
FYVF		Veronica Gliding Centre		23°26′00″S 018°16′10″E	
FYWB	WVB	Walvis Bay International Airport	Walvis Bay	22°58′47″S 014°38′43″E	
FYWD		Wolwedans Airport		25°07′01″S 016°00′02″E	
FYWE	ERS	Eros Airport	Windhoek	22°36′44″S 017°04′50″E	
FYWH	WDH	Hosea Kutako International Airport	Windhoek	22°29′12″S 017°27′45″E	
FYWI		Witvlei Airport		22°24′19″S 018°27′33″E	
FYWL		Wabi Lodge Airport		20°19′50″S 017°32′08″E	
FYWN		Waterberg Wilderness Airport		20°29′13″S 017°18′50″E	
FYXX		Canon Lodge Airport		27°39′35″S 017°50′16″E	
FYZR		Zebra River Lodge Airport		24°31′30″S 016°17′49″E	

== FZ – Democratic Republic of the Congo ==
Also see airport category and list.

ICAO	IATA	Airport name	Community	Coordinates	Notes
FZAA	FIH	N'Djili International Airport	Kinshasa	04°23′14″S 015°26′32″E	
FZAB	NLO	N'Dolo Airport	Kinshasa	04°19′36″S 015°19′38″E	
FZAD		Celo-Zongo Airport		04°47′25″S 014°54′20″E	
FZAE		Kimpoko Airport		04°13′01″S 015°34′01″E	Closed
FZAF		Nsangi Airport		05°36′22″S 015°20′06″E	Closed
FZAG	MNB	Muanda Airport	Moanda	05°55′51″S 012°21′06″E	
FZAH		Tshela Airport		04°58′59″S 012°55′59″E	Closed
FZAI		Kitona Air Base		05°55′05″S 012°26′51″E	
FZAJ	BOA	Boma Airport	Boma	05°51′15″S 013°03′49″E	
FZAL	LZI	Luozi Airport	Luozi	04°56′40″S 014°07′25″E	
FZAM	MAT	Tshimpi Airport	Matadi	05°48′00″S 013°26′25″E	
FZAN		Inga Airport	Inga	05°31′50″S 013°34′45″E	
FZAP		Lukala Airport	Lukala	05°29′55″S 014°31′45″E	
FZAR	NKL	Nkolo-Fuma Airport	Kolo Fuma	05°25′15″S 014°49′00″E	
FZAS		Inkisi Airport	Inkisi	05°10′00″S 015°00′00″E	Closed
FZAU		Konde Airport		05°46′11″S 012°15′04″E	
FZAW		Kwilu-Ngongo Airport	Kwilu-Ngongo	05°30′10″S 014°42′25″E	
FZAX		Luheki Airport		04°51′00″S 013°46′01″E	Closed
FZAY		Mvula Sanda Airport	Kizulu	05°37′36″S 013°25′32″E	
FZBA	INO	Inongo Airport	Inongo	01°56′50″S 018°17′09″E	
FZBB		Bongimba Airport	Bongimba	03°24′30″S 020°05′10″E	
FZBC		Bikoro Airport		00°43′59″S 018°07′59″E	Closed
FZBD		Oshwe Airport	Oshwe	03°25′20″S 019°25′15″E	
FZBE		Beno Airport	Beno	03°36′00″S 017°47′00″E	Closed
FZBF		Bonkita Airport	Bonkita	03°06′25″S 018°47′08″E	
FZBG		Kempa Airport	Kempa	02°57′15″S 018°22′45″E	Closed
FZBH		Isongo Airport	Isongo	01°24′00″S 018°24′00″E	Closed
FZBI	NIO	Nioki Airport	Nioki	02°43′03″S 017°41′05″E	
FZBJ		Mushie Airport	Mushie	03°00′30″S 016°55′35″E	
FZBK		Boshwe Airport	Boshwe	03°04′00″S 018°38′30″E	
FZBL		Djokele Airport	Djokele	02°58′13″S 017°06′15″E	
FZBN		Malebo Airport	Malebo	02°27′50″S 016°28′50″E	
FZBO	FDU	Bandundu Airport	Bandundu	03°18′40″S 017°22′54″E	
FZBP		Bolongonkele Airport	Bologonkele	02°48′00″S 019°54′30″E	
FZBQ		Bindja Airport	Bindja	03°22′45″S 019°35′45″E	
FZBS		Semendua Airport	Semendua	03°14′15″S 018°08′00″E	
FZBT	KRZ	Basango Mboliasa Airport	Kiri	01°30′00″S 018°55′40″E	
FZBU		Ipeke Airport	Ipeke	02°32′15″S 018°14′40″E	
FZBV		Kempile Airport	Kutu	02°43′45″S 018°06′25″E	
FZBW		Basengele Airport	Bokote	01°51′40″S 017°57′40″E	
FZCA	KKW	Kikwit Airport	Kikwit	05°02′09″S 018°47′08″E	
FZCB	IDF	Idiofa Airport	Idiofa	04°58′15″S 019°34′50″E	
FZCD		Vanga Airport	Vanga	04°25′30″S 018°25′35″E	
FZCE	LUS	Lusanga Airport	Lusanga	04°48′15″S 018°43′10″E	Closed
FZCF		Kahemba Airport	Kahemba	07°20′25″S 018°59′20″E	
FZCI		Banga Airport	Banga	05°27′32″S 020°27′45″E	
FZCK		Kajiji Airport	Kajiji	07°38′50″S 018°29′50″E	
FZCL		Banza Lute Airport		04°12′00″S 017°49′59″E	Closed
FZCM		Mangai Ii Airport	Mangai	04°02′05″S 019°31′35″E	Closed
FZCN		Lunkuni Airport		04°08′31″S 017°34′25″E	
FZCO		Boko Airport		05°17′31″S 016°46′30″E	
FZCP		Popokabaka Airport	Popokabaka	05°44′20″S 016°35′10″E	
FZCR		Busala Airport	Busala	04°10′05″S 018°41′55″E	
FZCS		Kenge Airport	Kenge	04°50′15″S 017°01′45″E	Closed
FZCT		Fatundu Airport		04°07′59″S 017°12′00″E	Closed
FZCU		Ito Airport	Ito	03°20′00″S 017°28′00″E	Closed
FZCV	MSM	Masi-Manimba Airport	Masi-Manimba	04°47′00″S 017°51′12″E	
FZCW		Wamba Airport	Kikongo Sur Wamba	04°15′50″S 017°11′05″E	
FZCX		Kimafu Airport		04°36′00″S 017°34′59″E	Closed
FZCY		Yuki Airport		04°04′59″S 019°25′59″E	Closed
FZDA		Malanga Airport		05°31′59″S 014°51′00″E	Closed
FZDB		Kimbau Airport		05°37′01″S 017°36′00″E	Closed
FZDD		Wamba Luadi Airport		06°28′25″S 017°20′14″E	
FZDE		Tono Airport		06°20′03″S 018°12′51″E	
FZDF		Nzamba Airport	Nzamba	06°50′00″S 017°41′45″E	
FZDG		Nyanga Airport	Nianga	05°57′55″S 020°26′10″E	
FZDH		Ngi Airport		04°25′01″S 017°10′01″E	Closed
FZDJ		Mutena Airport	Mutena	06°45′50″S 021°09′30″E	
FZDK		Kipata-Katika Airport		05°01′59″S 017°39′00″E	Closed
FZDL		Kolokoso Airport		04°27′00″S 017°25′01″E	Closed
FZDM		Masamuna Airport		04°48′00″S 017°34′59″E	Closed
FZDN		Mongo Wa Kenda Airport	Mongo Wa Kenda	06°55′05″S 016°55′10″E	
FZDO		Moanza Airport	Moanza	05°31′59″S 017°37′01″E	Closed
FZDP		Mukedi Airport	Mukedi	05°38′00″S 019°47′00″E	
FZDQ		Mazelele Airport	Manzalele	07°16′55″S 017°01′50″E	
FZDR		Bokela Airport	Bokela	01°14′50″S 022°00′26″E	
FZDS		Yasa Bongo Airport		04°27′00″S 017°46′59″E	Closed
FZDT		Matari Airport	Isiro	06°09′07″S 017°36′09″E	
FZDU		Kimpangu Airport		05°49′59″S 015°00′00″E	Closed
FZDY		Missayi Airport		03°52′59″S 017°21′00″E	Closed
FZEA	MDK	Mbandaka Airport	Mbandaka	00°01′21″N 018°17′19″E	
FZEB		Monieka Airport		00°04′01″S 019°58′59″E	Closed
FZEI		Ingende Airport	Ingende	00°18′30″S 018°56′45″E	
FZEM		Yembe-Moke Airport	Bikoro	04°40′59″S 018°13′01″E	Closed
FZEN	BSU	Basankusu Airport	Basankusu	01°13′29″N 019°47′20″E	
FZEO		Beongo Airport	Beongo	01°02′33″N 020°39′31″E	Closed
FZEP		Mentole Airport		01°19′01″N 020°42′00″E	Closed
FZER		Kodoro Airport		01°16′59″N 020°19′59″E	Closed
FZES		Ngumu Airport		01°28′01″N 020°18′00″E	Closed
FZFA	LIE	Libenge Airport	Libenge	03°37′45″N 018°38′15″E	
FZFB		Imesse Airport	Imesse	02°31′00″N 018°17′00″E	Closed
FZFC		Engengele Airport	Engengele	02°07′00″N 022°38′50″E	
FZFD	BDT	Gbadolite Airport	Gbadolite	04°15′10″N 020°58′30″E	
FZFE		Abumumbazi Airport	Abumumbazi	03°41′45″N 022°09′00″E	
FZFF		Bau Airport	Bau	03°44′00″N 019°05′00″E	Closed
FZFG		Bokada Airport	Bokada	04°07′20″N 019°25′08″E	
FZFH		Mokaria-Yamoleka Airport	Mokaria-Yamoleka	02°05′50″N 023°14′35″E	
FZFJ		Goyongo Airport	Goyongo	04°10′35″N 019°48′05″E	
FZFK	GMA	Gemena Airport	Gemena	03°14′07″N 019°46′15″E	
FZFL		Kala Airport	Monganzu	03°23′00″N 018°39′20″E	Closed
FZFN		Lombo Airport	Lombo	04°26′20″N 019°32′20″E	Closed
FZFP		Kotakoli Air Base	Kotakoli	04°09′17″N 021°39′46″E	
FZFQ		Mpaka Airport	Mpaka	04°06′20″N 019°13′50″E	
FZFR		Mombongo Airport	Mombongo	01°39′10″N 023°09′10″E	
FZFS		Karawa Airport	Karawa	03°21′42″N 020°17′50″E	
FZFT		Tandala Airport	Tandala	02°58′40″N 019°21′05″E	
FZFU	BMB	Bumba Airport	Bumba	02°10′58″N 022°28′54″E	
FZFV		Gbado Airport	Gbado	03°53′00″N 020°47′00″E	Closed
FZFW		Gwaka Airport	Gwaka	02°28′25″N 020°05′30″E	
FZGA	LIQ	Lisala Airport	Lisala	02°10′15″N 021°29′50″E	
FZGB		Bosondjo Airport	Bosondjo	01°52′15″N 021°45′35″E	Closed
FZGC		Bolila Airport	Bolila	01°51′10″N 023°06′55″E	
FZGE		Binga Airport	Binga	02°22′00″N 020°30′50″E	
FZGF		Bokungu Airport	Bokungu	00°35′25″S 022°17′55″E	
FZGG		Mondombe Airport		00°52′59″S 022°49′01″E	Closed
FZGH		Wema Airport		00°25′59″S 021°39′00″E	Closed
FZGI		Yalingimba Airport	Yalingimba	02°16′25″N 022°50′50″E	
FZGN	BNB	Boende Airport	Boende	00°17′12″S 020°53′00″E	
FZGT		Boteka Airport	Boteka	00°19′00″S 019°04′00″E	
FZGV	IKL	Ikela Airport	Ikela	01°02′55″S 023°22′20″E	
FZGX		Monkoto Airport	Monkoto	01°43′20″S 020°41′25″E	
FZGY		Yemo Airport	Yemo	00°26′55″S 021°55′06″E	
FZIA		Simisini Air Base	Kisangani	00°31′02″N 025°09′20″E	
FZIC	FKI	Bangoka International Airport	Kisangani	00°28′54″N 025°20′17″E	
FZIG		KM 95 CFL Airport	Kabeta	00°08′26″S 25°23′44″E	Closed
FZIK		Katende Airport		00°19′59″N 025°30′00″E	Closed
FZIR	YAN	Yangambi Airport	Yangambi	00°47′18″N 024°27′14″E	
FZIZ		Lokutu Airport	Lokutu	01°07′50″N 023°36′05″E	
FZJA		Isiro-Ville Airport	Isiro	02°46′55″N 027°37′32″E	Closed
FZJB		Doko Airport	Doko	03°08′40″N 029°35′30″E	
FZJC		Dungu-Uye Airport	Dungu	03°35′52″N 028°34′35″E	
FZJD		Doruma Airport	Doruma	04°43′05″N 027°41′30″E	
FZJF		Aba Airport	Aba	03°51′35″N 030°15′15″E	
FZJH	IRP	Matari Airport	Isiro	02°49′40″N 027°35′15″E	
FZJI		Watsa Airport	Watsa	02°59′40″N 029°32′50″E	
FZJK		Faradje Airport	Faradje	03°42′55″N 029°42′45″E	
FZJN		Luniemu Airport	Luniemu	08°12′30″S 024°42′10″E	
FZJR		Kerekere Airport		02°43′52″N 030°32′00″E	Closed
FZKA	BUX	Bunia Airport	Bunia	01°33′57″N 030°13′15″E	
FZKB		Bambili-Dingila Airport	Bambili and Dingila	03°39′19″N 026°05′00″E	
FZKC		Mahagi Airport		02°17′35″N 031°01′34″E	
FZKF		Kilomines Airport		01°49′01″N 030°13′59″E	Closed
FZKI		Yedi Airport		02°01′59″N 024°48′00″E	Closed
FZKJ	BZU	Buta Zega Airport	Buta Zega	02°49′06″N 024°47′37″E	
FZKN		Aketi Airport	Aketi	02°43′50″N 023°47′35″E	
FZKO		Ango Airport		04°01′44″N 025°51′46″E	
FZMA	BKY	Kavumu Airport	Bukavu	02°18′30″S 028°48′31″E	
FZMB	RUE	Butembo Airport	Butembo	00°06′59″N 029°18′48″E	
FZMC		Mulungu Airport	Mulungu	02°58′25″S 027°52′10″E	
FZMD		Nzovu Airport	Nzovu	02°34′30″S 027°59′20″E	
FZMK		Bulongo Kigogo Airport		02°40′01″S 028°42′00″E	Closed
FZMP		Kimano Ii Airport		04°22′59″S 028°21′00″E	Closed
FZMW		Shabunda Airport	Shabunda	02°41′25″S 027°20′40″E	
FZNA	GOM	Goma International Airport	Goma	01°40′15″S 029°14′18″E	
FZNB		Katale Airport	Katale	01°19′30″S 029°22′30″E	
FZNC		Rutshuru Airport	Rutshuru	01°09′45″S 029°25′47″E	
FZNF		Lubero Airport	Lubero	00°08′20″S 029°14′30″E	
FZNI		Ishasha Airport	Ishasha	00°44′29″S 029°37′28″E	
FZNK		Katanda Rusthuru Airport		00°48′00″S 029°22′01″E	Closed
FZNP	BNC	Beni Airport	Beni	00°34′30″N 029°28′26″E	
FZNQ		Obaye Airport	Obaye	01°20′05″S 027°43′40″E	
FZNR		Rwindi Airport	Rwindi	00°47′45″S 029°17′25″E	
FZNS		Wageni Airport	Beni	00°30′30″N 029°28′30″E	
FZOA	KND	Kindu Airport	Kindu	02°55′09″S 025°54′55″E	
FZOB		Tingi-Tingi Airport	Tingi-Tingi	00°47′27″S 026°38′37″E	
FZOC		Kamisuku Airport	Kalima	02°33′20″S 026°37′30″E	
FZOD	KLY	Kinkungwa Airport	Kalima	02°34′35″S 026°44′00″E	
FZOE		Kampene Airport	Kampene	03°35′35″S 026°42′05″E	
FZOF		Kiapupe Airport		02°54′00″S 027°12′00″E	Closed
FZOG		Lulingu Tshionka Airport	Lulingu	02°19′00″S 027°31′35″E	
FZOH		Moga Airport	Moga	02°27′40″S 026°48′50″E	
FZOJ		Obokote Airport		00°51′00″S 026°19′59″E	Closed
FZOK		Kasongo Airport	Kasongo	04°31′25″S 026°36′00″E	
FZOO		Kailo Airport	Kailo Territory	02°37′50″S 026°06′00″E	
FZOP	PUN	Punia Airport	Punia	01°23′30″S 026°20′55″E	
FZOQ		Punia-Basenge Airport	Punia	01°29′00″S 026°26′25″E	
FZOR		Saulia Airport	Saulia	01°31′45″S 026°32′05″E	
FZOS		Kasese Airport	Kasese	01°38′18″S 027°05′05″E	
FZOT		Phibraki Airport		02°55′59″S 027°31′59″E	Closed
FZPB		Kamituga Airport	Kamituga	03°02′45″S 028°10′05″E	
FZPC		Lugushwa Airport	Lugushwa	03°21′25″S 027°52′15″E	
FZQA	FBM	Lubumbashi International Airport	Lubumbashi	11°35′29″S 027°31′52″E	
FZQC	PWO	Pweto Airport	Pweto	08°24′00″S 028°55′35″E	
FZQD		Mulungwishi Airport		10°45′00″S 026°37′59″E	Closed
FZQF		Fungurume Airport	Fungurume	10°32′00″S 026°19′30″E	
FZQG	KEC	Kasenga Airport	Kasenga	10°21′20″S 028°37′00″E	
FZQH		Katwe Airport	Katwe	10°33′45″S 027°51′10″E	
FZQI		Kamatanda Airport	Likasi	10°53′30″S 026°44′40″E	Closed
FZQJ		Mwadingusha Airport	Mwadingusha	10°45′24″S 027°12′55″E	
FZQM	KWZ	Kolwezi International Airport	Kolwezi	10°45′57″S 025°30′21″E	
FZQN		Mutshatsha Airport	Mutshatsha	10°33′45″S 024°25′10″E	
FZQP		Kisenge Airport	Kisenge	10°40′01″S 023°10′30″E	
FZQU		Lubudi Airport	Lubudi	09°54′50″S 025°58′10″E	
FZQV		Mitwaba Airport	Mitwaba	08°38′40″S 027°20′40″E	
FZQW		Luishi Airport	Luishi	09°45′00″S 027°46′30″E	
FZRA	MNO	Manono Airport	Manono	07°17′20″S 027°23′40″E	
FZRB	BDV	Moba Airport	Moba	07°05′05″S 029°44′15″E	
FZRC		Mukoy Airport	Mukoy	07°32′57″S 028°40′20″E	
FZRD		Kabombo Airport	Kabombo	07°24′10″S 028°01′53″E	Closed
FZRE		Bukena Airport	Bukena	07°46′40″S 027°12′55″E	
FZRF	FMI	Kalemie Airport	Kalemie	05°52′30″S 029°15′00″E	
FZRG		Sominka Airport		07°25′00″S 027°09′00″E	Closed
FZRJ		Pepa Airport	Pepa	07°42′55″S 029°48′35″E	
FZRK		Kansimba Airport	Kansimba	07°19′30″S 029°10′25″E	
FZRL		Lusinga Airport	Lusinga	08°55′35″S 027°11′45″E	
FZRM	KBO	Kabalo Airport	Kabalo	06°05′00″S 026°55′00″E	
FZRN		Nyunzu Airport	Nyunzu	05°57′05″S 028°02′10″E	
FZRO		Luvua Airport		07°55′50″S 028°31′45″E	
FZRQ	KOO	Kongolo Airport	Kongolo	05°23′40″S 026°59′25″E	
FZSA	KMN	Kamina Air Base	Kamina	08°38′31″S 025°15′10″E	
FZSB		Kamina Airport	Kamina	08°43′43″S 024°59′29″E	
FZSC		Songa Airport		08°06′47″S 025°02′13″E	
FZSD		Sandoa Airport	Sandoa	09°43′05″S 022°55′40″E	
FZSE		Kanene Airport		09°21′37″S 024°41′01″E	
FZSI		Dilolo Airport	Dilolo	10°45′30″S 022°20′35″E	
FZSJ		Kasaji Airport	Kasaji	10°22′25″S 023°25′30″E	
FZSK	KAP	Kapanga Airport	Kapanga	08°22′20″S 022°38′50″E	
FZTK	KNM	Kaniama Airport	Kaniama	07°36′05″S 024°09′25″E	
FZTL		Luena Airport	Luena	09°28′05″S 025°45′30″E	
FZTS		Kasese Kaniama Airport		07°41′55″S 024°02′58″E	
FZUA	KGA	Kananga Airport	Kananga	05°54′00″S 022°28′09″E	
FZUE		Lubondaie Airport	Lubondaie	06°34′15″S 022°38′50″E	
FZUF	KGN	Kasonga Airport	Kasonga	06°39′00″S 022°23′30″E	Closed
FZUG	LZA	Luiza Airport	Luiza	07°11′20″S 022°23′30″E	
FZUH	MMW	Moma Airport	Moma	07°14′05″S 022°36′30″E	
FZUI		Mboie Airport		06°50′31″S 022°00′31″E	
FZUJ		Muambi Airport		06°40′59″S 022°31′59″E	Closed
FZUK	TSH	Tshikapa Airport	Tshikapa	06°26′18″S 020°47′41″E	
FZUL		Bulape Airport		04°37′01″S 021°36′00″E	Closed
FZUM		Mutoto Airport		05°42′00″S 023°43′01″E	Closed
FZUN		Luebo Airport	Luebo	05°21′04″S 021°25′20″E	
FZUO		Musese Airport	Musese	05°25′50″S 021°30′02″E	
FZUP		Diboko Airport	Diboko	07°00′10″S 021°14′30″E	
FZUR		Tshibala Airport		06°55′59″S 022°00′00″E	Closed
FZUS		Tshikaji Airport	Tshikaji	05°58′35″S 022°27′25″E	
FZUT		Katubwe Airport		06°03′00″S 022°36′00″E	Closed
FZUU		Lutshatsha Airport		06°13′56″S 022°05′45″E	Closed
FZUV		Kalonda Airport		06°23′00″S 020°47′45″E	
FZVA	LJA	Lodja Airport	Lodja	03°27′45″S 023°36′55″E	
FZVC		Kole Sur Lukenie Airport	Kole	03°25′10″S 022°30′55″E	
FZVD		Dingele Airport	Dingele	03°36′00″S 024°35′00″E	Closed
FZVE		Lomela Airport	Lomela	02°17′25″S 023°21′15″E	
FZVF		Kutusongo Airport		02°40′01″S 023°10′01″E	Closed
FZVG		Katako'kombe Airport	Katako'kombe	03°27′25″S 024°25′25″E	
FZVH		Shongamba Airport		04°21′00″S 021°16′59″E	Closed
FZVI	LBO	Lusambo Airport	Lusambo	04°57′42″S 023°22′42″E	
FZVJ		Tshumbe Airport	Tshumbe	04°02′20″S 024°22′00″E	
FZVK		Lukombe-Batwa Airport		04°19′59″S 022°04′59″E	Closed
FZVL		Wasolo Airport		03°57′00″S 022°31′01″E	
FZVM	MEW	Mweka Airport	Mweka	04°51′18″S 021°32′30″E	
FZVN		Wembo-Nyama Airport	Wembo-Nyama	04°07′20″S 024°30′40″E	
FZVO		Beni-Dibele Airport	Bena Dibele	04°04′20″S 022°50′25″E	
FZVP		Dikungu Airport	Dikungu	04°02′20″S 024°28′10″E	
FZVR	BAN	Basongo Airport	Basongo	04°18′55″S 020°24′50″E	
FZVS		Ilebo Airport	Ilebo	04°19′48″S 020°36′21″E	
FZVT		Dekese Airport	Dekese	03°30′23″S 021°24′25″E	
FZVU		Idumbe Airport	Idumbe	03°55′25″S 021°33′25″E	
FZVV		Oduku Airport		04°10′30″S 024°38′54″E	Closed
FZWA	MJM	Mbuji Mayi Airport	Mbuji Mayi	06°07′16″S 023°34′08″E	
FZWB		Bibanga Airport	Bibanga	06°15′12″S 023°56′45″E	
FZWC	GDJ	Gandajika Airport	Gandajika	06°46′54″S 023°57′42″E	Closed
FZWE		Mwene-Ditu Airport	Mwene-Ditu	06°58′50″S 023°26′05″E	
FZWF		Kipushi Airport	Kipushi	06°08′10″S 025°09′32″E	
FZWI		Kashia Airport	Luputa	07°13′15″S 023°45′35″E	
FZWL		Munkamba Airport	Munkamba	05°45′38″S 023°03′20″E	
FZWR		Kisengwa Airport		06°01′01″S 025°52′59″E	Closed
FZWS		Lubao Airport	Lubao	05°23′20″S 025°44′35″E	
FZWT		Tunta Airport	Kabinda	06°07′14″S 024°32′46″E	
