= List of airports in Lesotho =

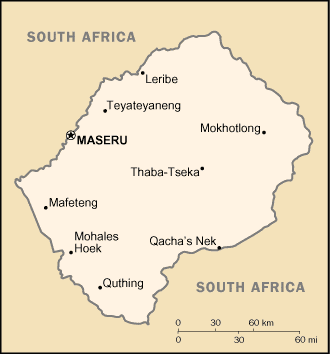
Map of Lesotho

This is a list of airports in Lesotho, sorted by location.

== List ==
Airport names that are indicated in bold indicate that the facility has scheduled service on commercial airlines.

Location	ICAO	IATA	Airport name
Bobete	FXBB		Bobete Airport
Katse	FXKA		Katse Airport
Kuebunyane	FXKY		Kuebunyane Airport
Lebakeng	FXLK	LEF	Lebakeng Airport
Leribe	FXLR	LRB	Leribe Airport
Lesobeng	FXLS	LES	Lesobeng Airport
Letlapeng	FXKB		Kolberg Airport
Letseng diamond mine	FXLT		Letseng Airport
Mafeteng	FXMF	MFC	Mafeteng Airport
Malefiloane	FXML		Malefiloane Airstrip
Matekane	FXME*		Matekane Air Strip
Mantsonyane	FXMN		Mantsonyane Airport
Matabeng	FXMT		Matabeng Store Airstrip
Matsaile	FXMA	MSG	Matsaile Airport
Mohale's Hoek	FXMH		Mohale's Hoek Airport
Mohlanapeng	FXMP		Mohlanapeng Airport
Mokhotlong	FXMK	MKH	Mokhotlong Airport
Maseru	FXMM	MSU	**Moshoeshoe I International Airport**
Maseru	FXMU		Mejametalana Airport
Nkaus	FXNK	NKU	Nkaus Airport
Nohana	FXNH		Nohana Airport
Pelaneng	FXPG	PEL	Pelaneng Airport
Quthing	FXQG	UTG	Quthing Airport
Qacha's Nek	FXQN	UNE	Qacha's Nek Airport
Sehlabathebe	FXSE		Sehlabathebe Airport
Sehonghong	FXSH	SHK	Sehonghong Airport
Sekake	FXSK	SKQ	Sekake Airport
Semenanyane			Semenanyane Airport
Semonkong	FXSM	SOK	Semonkong Airport
Seshote	FXSS	SHZ	Seshutes Airport
Tebellong	FXTB		Tebellong Airport
Thaba Tseka	FXTA	THB	Thaba Tseka Airport
Tlokoeng	FXTK	TKO	Tlokoeng Airport

* not officially identified by ICAO

== See also ==
- Transport in Lesotho
- List of airports by ICAO code: F#FX - Lesotho
- Wikipedia: WikiProject Aviation/Airline destination lists: Africa#Lesotho
