= Malefiloane Airstrip =

Airport in Lesotho

- IATA: none; ICAO: FXML

Summary
- Airport type: Public
- Serves: Malefiloane, Lesotho
- Elevation AMSL: 8,267 ft / 2,520 m
- Coordinates: 29°20′00″S 29°11′30″E

Map
- Location of the airport in Lesotho

Runways
Direction	Length		Surface
Direction	m	ft	Surface
09/27	880	2,887	Grass
- Sources: GCM Google Maps SkyVector

Malefiloane Airstrip (ICAO: FXML) is a high elevation airstrip serving the village of Malefiloane in Mokhotlong District, Lesotho. The runway is on a ridge above the Mokhotlong River valley.

There is higher terrain to the west.

== See also ==
- Transport in Lesotho
- List of airports in Lesotho
