= Bobete Airport =

Airport in Lesotho

- IATA: none; ICAO: FXBB

Summary
- Airport type: Public
- Owner: Bobete community council
- Serves: Bobete, Lesotho
- Elevation AMSL: 7,100 ft / 2,164 m
- Coordinates: 29°25′30″S 28°40′04″E

Map
- Location of the airport in Lesotho

Runways
Direction	Length		Surface
Direction	m	ft	Surface
16/34	550	1,804	Grass
- Sources: GCM Google Maps SkyVector

Bobete Airport (ICAO: FXBB) is an airport serving Bobete, a village in the Thaba-Tseka District of Lesotho.

The runway is at a high elevation. There are nearby ridges and ravines in all quadrants around the airport.

== See also ==
- Transport in Lesotho
- List of airports in Lesotho
