= Semenanyane Airport =

Airport in Lesotho

- IATA: none; ICAO: none

Summary
- Airport type: Public
- Serves: Semenanyane
- Elevation AMSL: 7,873 ft / 2,400 m
- Coordinates: 29°20′05″S 28°40′55″E

Map
- Location of the airport in Lesotho

Runways
Direction	Length		Surface
Direction	m	ft	Surface
18/36	530	1,739	Gravel
- Sources: Lesotho Govt. Google Maps

Semenanyane Airport is a well-marked airstrip serving the mission village of Semenanyane in Mokhotlong District, Lesotho. The runway is near the border with Thaba-Tseka District.

== See also ==
- Transport in Lesotho
- List of airports in Lesotho
