= Thaba-Tseka Airport =

Airport in Lesotho

- IATA: THB; ICAO: FXTA

Summary
- Airport type: Public
- Serves: Thaba-Tseka
- Elevation AMSL: 7,500 ft (2,300 m)
- Coordinates: 29°31′22″S 28°37′00″E

Map
- Location of the airport in Lesotho

Runways
Direction	Length		Surface
Direction	m	ft	Surface
05/23	682	2,238	Gravel
15/33	500	1,640	Gravel
- Source: GCM Google Maps

Thaba-Tseka Airport (IATA: THB, ICAO: FXTA) is an airport serving the town of Thaba-Tseka, the camptown of Thaba-Tseka District, Lesotho.

== See also ==
- Transport in Lesotho
- List of airports in Lesotho
