= SHZ =

SHZ or shz may refer to:

- Schleswig-Holsteinischer Zeitungsverlag, a newspaper group based in Flensburg, Schleswig-Holstein, Germany
- SHZ, the IATA code for Seshutes Airport, Leribe District, Lesotho
- shz, the ISO 639-3 code for Syenara language, Burkina Faso
