= Mohlanapeng Airport =

Airport in Lesotho

Mohlanapeng Airstrip
- IATA: none; ICAO: FXMP

Summary
- Airport type: Public
- Serves: Mohlanapeng
- Elevation AMSL: 7,294 ft / 2,223 m
- Coordinates: 29°34′58″S 28°40′35″E

Map
- Location of the airport in Lesotho

Runways
Direction	Length		Surface
Direction	m	ft	Surface
16/34	600	1,969	Dirt
- Sources: GCM Google Maps

Mohlanapeng Airstrip (ICAO: FXMP) is an airstrip serving the Mohlanapeng community in Thaba-Tseka District, Lesotho.

== See also ==
- Transport in Lesotho
- List of airports in Lesotho
