= Matekane Air Strip =

Airstrip in Lesotho

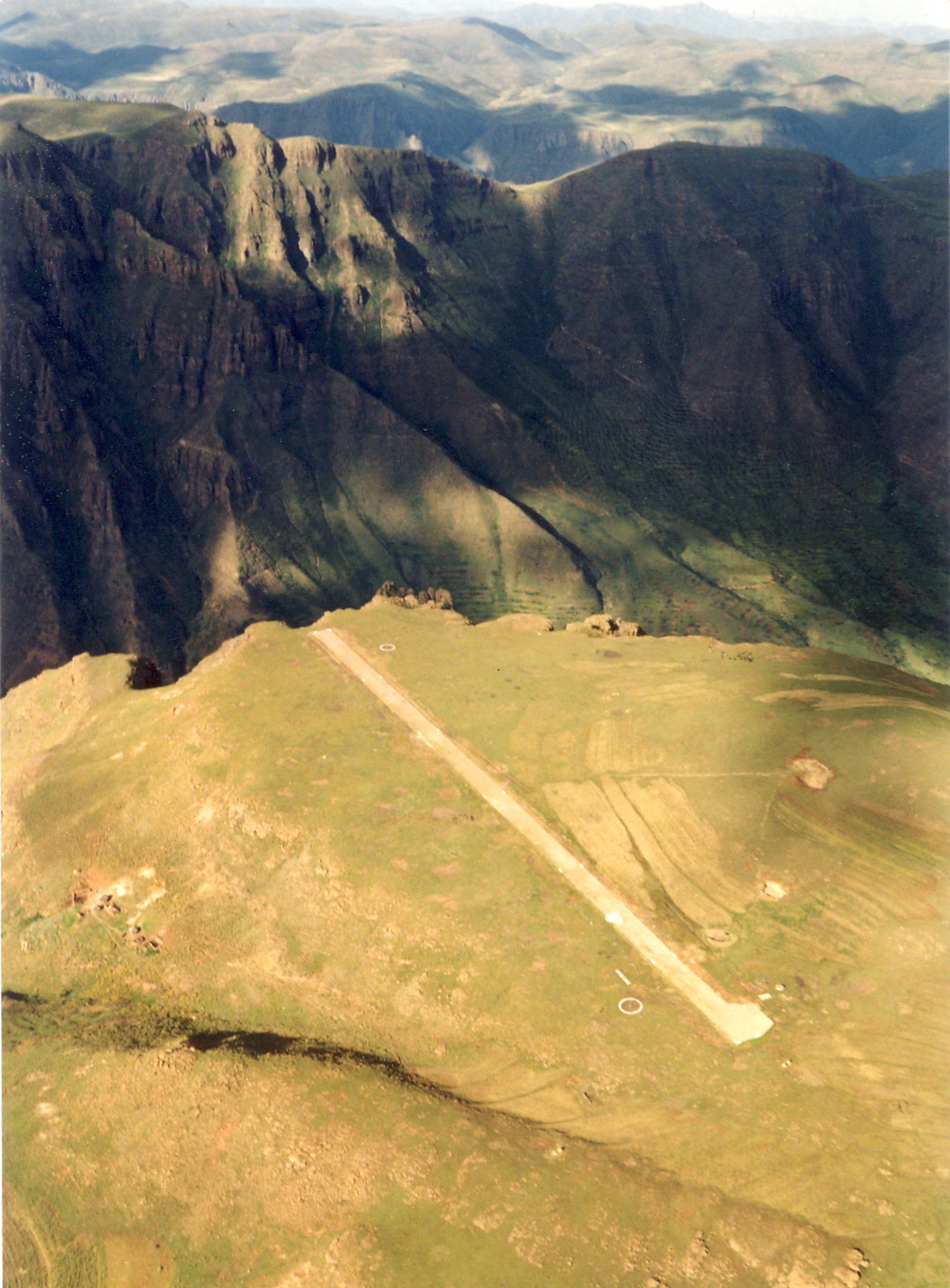
- Photo by Bush Pilot Tom Claytor 1993
- IATA: none; ICAO: FXME; LID: MTK

Summary
- Airport type: Public
- Elevation AMSL: 7,544 ft / 2,299 m
- Coordinates: 29.92916°S 27.84822°E

Map
- Location within Lesotho

Runways
Direction	Length		Surface
Direction	m	ft	Surface
08/26	580	1,903	Grass

Matekane Air Strip is a high elevation airstrip serving Matekane, Lesotho, with a runway that extends to the edge of a 500 m (1,600 ft) cliff. The runway is often used by charity organizations and doctors to access remote villages in the area, and has been described as one of the world's scariest runways.

== See also ==
- Transport in Lesotho
- List of airports in Lesotho
- List of shortest runways
