= Lesobeng Airport =

Airport in Lesotho

- IATA: LES; ICAO: FXLS

Summary
- Airport type: Public
- Owner: Lesobeng community council
- Serves: Lesobeng, Lesotho
- Elevation AMSL: 7,133 ft / 2,174 m
- Coordinates: 29°45′20″S 28°21′25″E

Map
- Location of the airport in Lesotho

Runways
Direction	Length		Surface
Direction	m	ft	Surface
03/21	530	1,739	Gravel
- Source: Google Maps GCM

Lesobeng Airport (IATA: LES, ICAO: FXLS) is an airstrip serving the community of Lesobeng, in the Thaba-Tseka District of Lesotho.

The runway sits atop a ridge with steep drops at either end.

== See also ==
- Transport in Lesotho
- List of airports in Lesotho
