= Kolberg Airport =

Airport in Lesotho

- IATA: none; ICAO: FXKB

Summary
- Airport type: Public
- Serves: Letlapeng, Lesotho
- Elevation AMSL: 7,000 ft / 2,134 m
- Coordinates: 29°22′42″S 28°29′32″E

Map
- Location of the airport in Lesotho

Runways
Direction	Length		Surface
Direction	m	ft	Surface
03/21	610	2,001	Dirt
- Sources: GCM Google Maps

Kolberg Airport (ICAO: FXKB) is an airstrip serving the village of Letlapeng in the Thaba-Tseka District of Lesotho.

The runway is in the shallow valley of the intermittent Khohlontso river, with higher terrain in all quadrants. Kolberg is only 4 kilometres (2.5 mi) away from the longer and better-developed runway at Katse Airport.

== See also ==
- Transport in Lesotho
- List of airports in Lesotho
