= List of rivers of Lesotho =

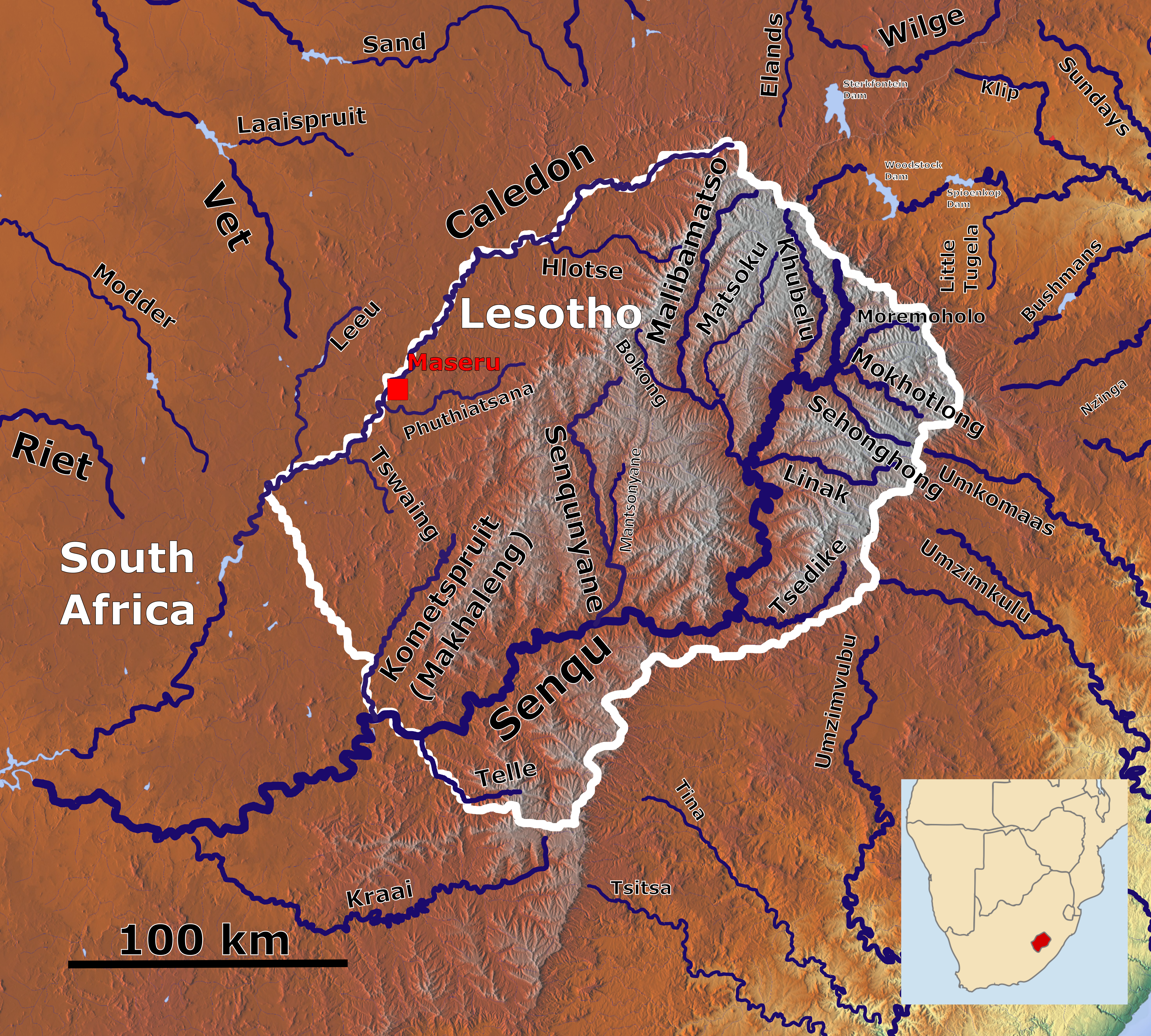
Rivers of Lesotho

This is a list of rivers in Lesotho. This list is arranged by drainage basin, with respective tributaries indented under each larger stream's name.

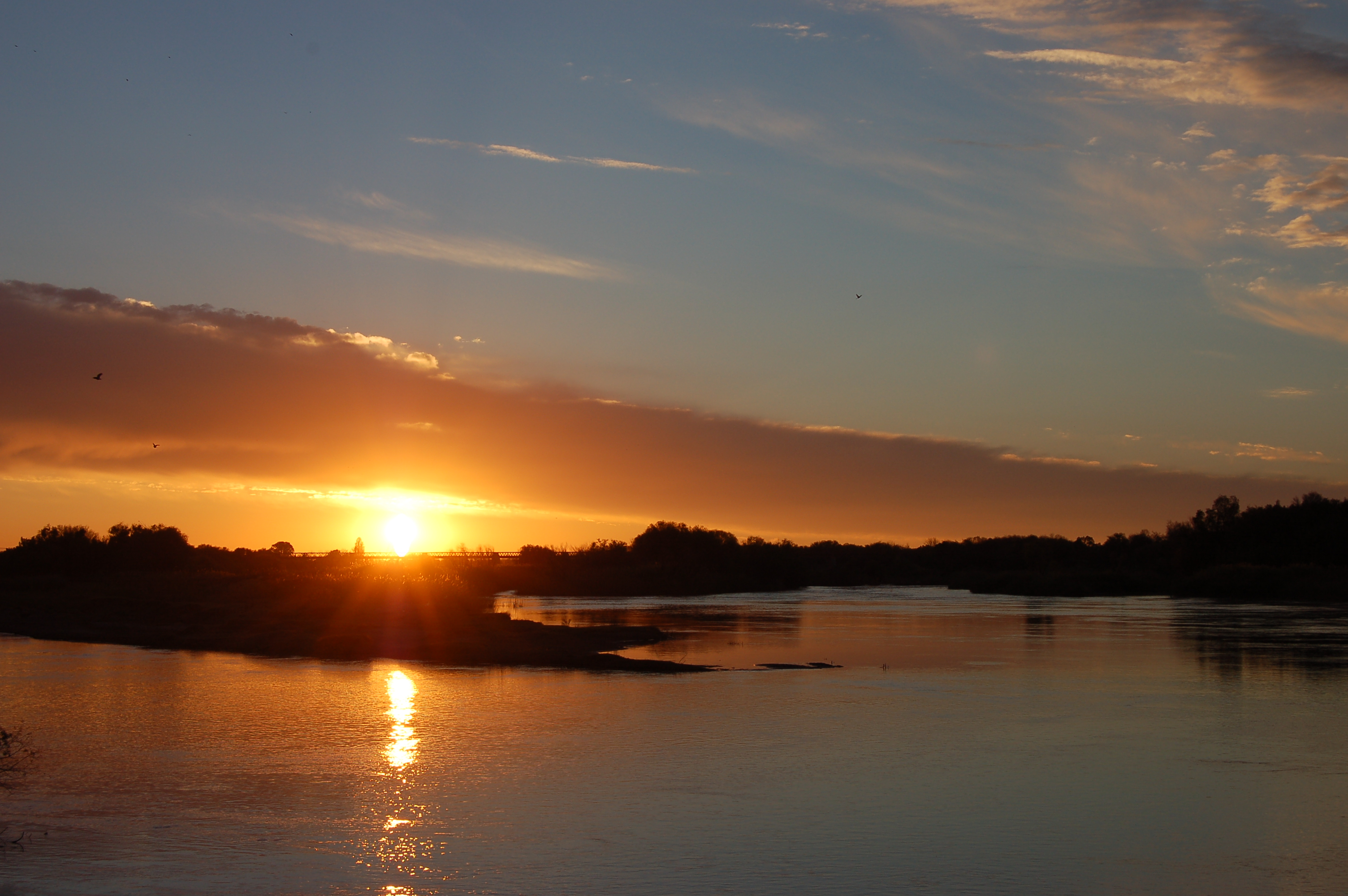
Sunset over the Orange River near Upington in the Northern Cape

- Orange River (Senqu River)
  - Caledon River (Mohokare River)
    - Little Caledon River
    - Ngoe River
  - Tele River
  - Makhaleng River
  - Senqunyane River
    - Mantsonyane River
  - Tsedike River
  - Malibamatšo River
    - Pelaneng River
  - Dinakeng River
  - Khubelu River
  - Mokhotlong River
