= Matabeng Store Airstrip =

Airport in Lesotho

- IATA: none; ICAO: FXMT

Summary
- Airport type: Public
- Serves: Matabeng Store
- Elevation AMSL: 6,300 ft / 1,920 m
- Coordinates: 29°48′50″S 28°48′32″E

Map
- Location of the airport in Lesotho

Runways
Direction	Length		Surface
Direction	m	ft	Surface
06/24	590	1,936	Dirt
- Sources: GCM Google Maps

Matabeng Store Airstrip (ICAO: FXMT) is an airstrip serving the village of Matabeng in Qacha's Nek District, Lesotho.

== See also ==
- Transport in Lesotho
- List of airports in Lesotho
