= Sehonghong Airport =

Airport in Lesotho

- IATA: SHK; ICAO: FXSH

Summary
- Airport type: Public
- Serves: Sehonghong
- Elevation AMSL: 6,500 ft / 1,981 m
- Coordinates: 29°43′51″S 28°46′08″E

Map
- Location of the airport in Lesotho

Runways
Direction	Length		Surface
Direction	m	ft	Surface
04/22	1,060	3,478	Gravel
15/33	610	2,001	Gravel
- Source: GCM Google Maps

Sehonghong Airport (IATA: SHK, ICAO: FXSH) is an airport serving the community council of Sehonghong, Lesotho.

== See also ==
- Transport in Lesotho
- List of airports in Lesotho
