= Tlokoeng Airport =

Airport in Lesotho

- IATA: TKO; ICAO: FXTK

Summary
- Airport type: Public
- Serves: Tlokoeng
- Elevation AMSL: 7,000 ft (2,100 m)
- Coordinates: 29°14′05″S 28°53′05″E

Map
- Location of the airport in Lesotho

Runways
Direction	Length		Surface
Direction	m	ft	Surface
14/32	560	1,837	Gravel
- Source: GCM Google Maps

Tlokoeng Airport (IATA: TKO, ICAO: FXTK) is an airport serving the village of Tlokoeng in Mokhotlong District, Lesotho.

== See also ==
- Transport in Lesotho
- List of airports in Lesotho
