= Sehlabathebe Airport =

Airport in Lesotho

- IATA: none; ICAO: FXSE

Summary
- Airport type: Public
- Serves: Sehlabathebe
- Elevation AMSL: 7,318 ft / 2,231 m
- Coordinates: 29°54′58″S 29°02′25″E

Map
- Location of the airport in Lesotho

Runways
Direction	Length		Surface
Direction	m	ft	Surface
11/29	850	2,789	Gravel
- Sources: Lesotho Govt. GCM Google Maps

Sehlabathebe Airport is an airstrip serving the village of Sehlabathebe in Qacha's Nek District, Lesotho.

== See also ==
- Transport in Lesotho
- List of airports in Lesotho
