= Mokhotlong Airport =

Airport in Lesotho

- IATA: MKH; ICAO: FXMK

Summary
- Airport type: Public
- Serves: Mokhotlong
- Elevation AMSL: 7,200 ft (2,200 m)
- Coordinates: 29°16′50″S 29°04′15″E

Map
- Location of the airport in Lesotho

Runways
Direction	Length		Surface
Direction	m	ft	Surface
13/31	797	2,615	Asphalt
17/35	700	2,297	Asphalt
- Source: GCM Google Maps

Mokhotlong Airport (IATA: MKH, ICAO: FXMK) is an airport serving Mokhotlong, the camptown of Mokhotlong District, Lesotho.

== See also ==
- Transport in Lesotho
- List of airports in Lesotho
