= Nohana Airport =

Airport in Mohale's Hoek District, Lesotho

Nohana Airport Ketane, Nohanas
- IATA: none; ICAO: FXNH

Summary
- Airport type: Public
- Serves: Nohana
- Elevation AMSL: 5,400 ft / 1,646 m
- Coordinates: 30°04′00″S 27°52′00″E

Map
- Location of the airport in Lesotho

Runways
Direction	Length		Surface
Direction	m	ft	Surface
09/27	550	1,804	Gravel
- Sources: Lesotho Govt. Google Maps

Nohana Airport (ICAO: FXNH) is an airstrip serving the village of Nohana/Kitane in Mohale's Hoek District, Lesotho.

== See also ==
- Transport in Lesotho
- List of airports in Lesotho
