= Seshutes Airport =

Airport in Lesotho

- IATA: SHZ; ICAO: FXSS

Summary
- Airport type: Public
- Serves: Seshote
- Elevation AMSL: 7,000 ft / 2,134 m
- Coordinates: 29°15′55″S 28°33′20″E

Map
- Location of the airport in Lesotho

Runways
Direction	Length		Surface
Direction	m	ft	Surface
06/24	702	2,303	Dirt
- Source: GCM, Google Maps, iata.org

Seshutes Airport (IATA: SHZ, ICAO: FXSS) or Seshote Airport is an airport serving the village of Seshote in Leribe District, Lesotho.

High terrain off both runway ends may require an angling approach.

== See also ==
- Transport in Lesotho
- List of airports in Lesotho
