= Mphe-Lebeko =

- Community Council
- Geographic Center of Community
- Coordinates: 29°25′33″S 28°15′18″E
- Country: Lesotho
- District: Thaba-Tseka District
- Elevation: 8,383 ft (2,555 m)

Population (2006)
  - Total: 11,463
- Time zone: UTC+2 (CAT)
- Coordinates computed from Lesotho Villages file.

Mphe-Lebeko is a community council located in the Thaba-Tseka District of Lesotho. Its population in 2006 was 11,463.

== Villages ==
The community of Mphe-Lebeko includes the villages of Aupolasi, Aupolasi (Ntsokoane), Beselateng, Boithatelo, Boloupere, Ha Chooko, Ha Davida, Ha Jimi, Ha Kamoho, Ha Koenyama, Ha Kokolia, Ha Leronti, Ha Letuka, Ha Mahlong, Ha Makeleme, Ha Mokotane, Ha Motšoari, Ha Muso, Ha Nnokoane, Ha Ntake, Ha Ntsokoane, Ha Nyane, Ha Raboshabane, Ha Ramabele, Ha Rankomo, Ha Ratšosane, Ha Sekola, Ha Sekolopata, Ha Sepiriti, Ha Taole, Ha Thabo, Ha Thabure, Ha Toka, Khohlong, Lekhalong, Lekhalong (Ha Khoaele), Letlapeng, Lihloaeleng, Lilomong, Linareng, Liphokoaneng, Liponchong, Majakaneng, Malebese, Malebese (Mpotjane), Malebese (Ntopo), Malebese (Sututsa), Malihase, Matebeleng, Matlakeng, Matsoapong, Mocheng, Moeaneng, Motse-Mocha, Ntširele, Phuleng, Rothe, Sehaula, Seipalle, Sekoti-se-Chitja, Thabaneng, Tiping and Tlapa-Letsotso.
