= Mavuka =

Town in eastern Lesotho

Coordinates: 29.8994°S 29.0555°E

Mavuka is a town in eastern Lesotho, close to the border with South Africa. It lies close to the Drakensberg, and is connected to both South Africa and the Lesotho towns of Matebeng and Paolosi by twisting mountain roads.
