= Lebakeng Airport =

Airport in Lesotho

- IATA: LEF; ICAO: FXLK

Summary
- Airport type: Public
- Serves: Lebakeng, Lesotho
- Elevation AMSL: 6,040 ft / 1,841 m
- Coordinates: 29°53′27″S 28°39′20″E

Map
- Location of the airport in Lesotho

Runways
Direction	Length		Surface
Direction	m	ft	Surface
11/29	548	1,798	Dirt
- Sources: GCM Google Maps

Lebakeng Airport (IATA: LEF, ICAO: FXLK) is an airport serving the settlement of Lebakeng, Lesotho.

The airstrip sits on a narrow ridge, with rising terrain to the west and a steep drop into a river valley off the east end. That, combined with the high elevation and short length, means users must exercise caution.

== See also ==
- Transport in Lesotho
- List of airports in Lesotho
