= Kuebunyane Airport =

Airport in Lesotho

Kuebunyane Airstrip
- IATA: none; ICAO: FXKY

Summary
- Airport type: Public
- Serves: Kuebunyane, Lesotho
- Elevation AMSL: 7,524 ft / 2,293 m
- Coordinates: 29°53′05″S 28°21′40″E

Map
- Location of the airport in Lesotho

Runways
Direction	Length		Surface
Direction	m	ft	Surface
09/27	590	1,936	Gravel
- Sources: Lesotho Govt. Google Maps

Kuebunyane Airport (ICAO: FXKY) is an airstrip serving the Basotho villages of Kuebunyane in Mohale's Hoek District, Lesotho.

The runway is on a ridge above a river valley, with no overrun on the east end. There is high terrain in all quadrants.

== See also ==
- Transport in Lesotho
- List of airports in Lesotho
