= Thaba-Kholo =

- Community Council
- Geographic Center of Community
- Coordinates: 29°43′01″S 28°19′33″E
- Country: Lesotho
- District: Thaba-Tseka District
- Elevation: 8,645 ft (2,635 m)

Population (2006)
  - Total: 10,241
- Time zone: UTC+2 (CAT)
- Coordinates computed from Lesotho Villages file.

Thaba-Kholo is a community council located in the Thaba-Tseka District of Lesotho. Its population in 2006 was 10,241.

== Villages ==
The community of Thaba-Kholo includes the villages of Bothoba-Pelo, Ha Botala, Ha Fisane, Ha Khetsi, Ha Khomari, Ha Kou, Ha Lali, Ha Lepolesa, Ha Lethibella, Ha Mafa, Ha Mafike, Ha Makara, Ha Makhala (Kholokoe), Ha Marontoane, Ha Mateu, Ha Matsosa, Ha Mokebisa, Ha Moketane, Ha Mokhafi, Ha Mokhoro, Ha Mokolana, Ha Mokone, Ha Mokotjo, Ha Molupe, Ha Mosa, Ha Mosiroe, Ha Motsiba, Ha Ngope, Ha Nnamo, Ha Nthoana, Ha Nyolo, Ha Phefo, Ha Poho, Ha Poho (Hleoheng), Ha Rahlabi, Ha Rahlolo, Ha Sehlahla, Ha Sekharume, Ha Thebane, Ha Tjako, Ha Tsiu (Koeneng), Ha Tšoarelo, Khamolane, Khatleng, Khohlong, Khohlong (Hleoheng), Khubetsoana, Khutlang, Letlapeng, Liphakoeng, Litenteng, Macheseng, Makhausing, Makoetjaneng, Manganeng, Mapetleng, Matebeleng, Mpokochela, Ntšilile, Phororong, Rolong, Sefateng, Sehlabeng-sa-hae, Shoella, Taung, Thabaneng and Thoteng.
