= Mafeteng Airport =

Airport in Lesotho

- IATA: MFC; ICAO: FXMF

Summary
- Airport type: Public
- Serves: Mafeteng, Lesotho
- Elevation AMSL: 5,350 ft / 1,631 m
- Coordinates: 29°48′05″S 27°14′40″E

Map
- Location of the airport in Lesotho

Runways
Direction	Length		Surface
Direction	m	ft	Surface
15/33	708	2,323	Grass
- Source: GCM Google Maps SkyVector

Mafeteng Airport (IATA: MFC, ICAO: FXMF) is an airport serving the city of Mafeteng, the capital of Mafeteng District, Lesotho.

The Maseru (Mazenod) VOR-DME (Ident: MZV) is located 23.7 nautical miles (43.9 km) northeast of the airport.

== See also ==
- Transport in Lesotho
- List of airports in Lesotho
