= Tebellong Airport =

Airport in Lesotho

- IATA: none; ICAO: FXTB

Summary
- Airport type: Public
- Serves: Tebellong
- Elevation AMSL: 5,600 ft (1,700 m)
- Coordinates: 30°03′05″S 28°27′35″E

Map
- Location of the airport in Lesotho

Runways
Direction	Length		Surface
Direction	m	ft	Surface
11/29	622	2,041	Gravel
- Source: GCM Google Maps

Tebellong Airport (ICAO: FXTB) is an airport serving the village of Tebellong in Qacha's Nek District, Lesotho.

== See also ==
- Transport in Lesotho
- List of airports in Lesotho
