= Pelaneng Airport =

Airport in Lesotho

- IATA: PEL; ICAO: FXPG

Summary
- Airport type: Public
- Serves: Pelaneng
- Elevation AMSL: 7,200 ft / 2,195 m
- Coordinates: 29°5′17″S 28°29′50″E

Map
- Location of the airport in Lesotho

Runways
Direction	Length		Surface
Direction	ft	m	Surface
13/31		610	Dirt
- Source: GCM Google Maps

Pelaneng Airport (IATA: PEL, ICAO: FXPG) is an airport serving the settlement of Pelaneng, Lesotho.

The high elevation, unmarked airstrip sits on a narrow ridge south of the confluence of the Pelaneng and Malibamatso rivers, with rising terrain to the west and a 400+ ft drop into the river valley off the east end. Another higher ridge lies 2,500 feet (762 m) off the east end, requiring an angling final to runway 29. Landing east is less obstructed, but the downhill slope, short runway, and dropoff make it inadvisable.

Aerial imagery from 2018 shows an embanked roadway has been cut across the runway, rendering the runway unusable.

== See also ==
- Transport in Lesotho
- List of airports in Lesotho
