= Mohale's Hoek Airport =

Airport in Lesotho

- IATA: none; ICAO: FXMH

Summary
- Airport type: Public
- Serves: Mohale's Hoek
- Elevation AMSL: 5,146 ft / 1,569 m
- Coordinates: 30°08′40″S 27°28′15″E

Map
- Location of the airport in Lesotho

Runways
Direction	Length		Surface
Direction	m	ft	Surface
14/32	622	2,041	Paved
- Source: GCM Google Maps

Mohale's Hoek Airport (ICAO: FXMH) is an airport serving the city of Mohale's Hoek, the capital of Mohale's Hoek District, Lesotho.

== See also ==
- Transport in Lesotho
- List of airports in Lesotho
