= Matsaile Airport =

Airport in Lesotho

- IATA: MSG; ICAO: FXMA

Summary
- Airport type: Public
- Serves: Matsaile
- Elevation AMSL: 6,200 ft / 1,890 m
- Coordinates: 29°50′25″S 28°46′35″E

Map
- Location of the airport in Lesotho

Runways
| Direction | Length | | Surface |
| Direction | m | ft | Surface |
|---|---|---|---|
| 07/25 | 545 | 1,788 | Dirt |
- Source: GCM Google Maps

Matsaile Airport (IATA: MSG, ICAO: FXMA) is an airport serving the village of Matsaile in Thaba-Tseka District, Lesotho.

== See also ==
- List of airports in Lesotho
- Transport in Lesotho
