= Quthing Airport =

Airport in Lesotho

- IATA: UTG; ICAO: FXQG

Summary
- Airport type: Public
- Serves: Quthing
- Elevation AMSL: 5,350 ft / 1,631 m
- Coordinates: 30°24′26″S 27°41′35″E

Map
- Location of the airport in Lesotho

Runways
Direction	Length		Surface
Direction	m	ft	Surface
14/32	647	2,123	Gravel
- Source: Lesotho Govt. GCM Google Maps

Quthing Airport (IATA: UTG, ICAO: FXQG) is an airport serving the settlement of Quthing, Lesotho.

== See also ==
- Transport in Lesotho
- List of airports in Lesotho
