= Nkaus Airport =

Airport in Lesotho

- IATA: NKU; ICAO: FXNK

Summary
- Airport type: Public
- Serves: Nkaus
- Elevation AMSL: 5,621 ft / 1,713 m
- Coordinates: 30°01′17″S 28°11′50″E

Map
- Location of the airport in Lesotho

Runways
Direction	Length		Surface
Direction	m	ft	Surface
09/27	690	2,264	Paved
- Source: GCM Google Maps

Nkaus Airport (IATA: NKU, ICAO: FXNK) is an airport serving the village of Nkaus, Lesotho.

== See also ==
- Transport in Lesotho
- List of airports in Lesotho
