= Sekake Airport =

Airport in Lesotho

- IATA: SKQ; ICAO: FXSK

Summary
- Airport type: Public
- Serves: Sekake
- Elevation AMSL: 5,700 ft / 1,737 m
- Coordinates: 30°02′20″S 28°22′13″E

Map
- Location of the airport in Lesotho

Runways
| Direction | Length | | Surface |
| Direction | m | ft | Surface |
|---|---|---|---|
| 15/33 | 670 | 2,198 | Grass |
- Source: GCM Google Maps

Sekake Airport (IATA: SKQ, ICAO: FXSK) is an airport serving the village of Sekake, Lesotho.

The airstrip sits atop a mesa with steep dropoffs at both ends.

The Google Map link has Sekake village labelled with its community council name of ′Patlong′

== See also ==
- Transport in Lesotho
- List of airports in Lesotho
