= Letseng Airport =

Airport in Lesotho

- IATA: none; ICAO: FXLT

Summary
- Airport type: Public
- Serves: Letseng diamond mine
- Elevation AMSL: 10,400 ft (3,200 m)
- Coordinates: 29°00′35″S 28°51′25″E

Map
- Location of the airport in Lesotho

Runways
| Direction | Length | | Surface |
| Direction | m | ft | Surface |
|---|---|---|---|
| 10/28 | 1,160 | 3,806 | Gravel |
- Sources: GCM Google Maps

Letseng Airport (ICAO: FXLT) is an airstrip serving the Letseng diamond mine in Mokhotlong District, Lesotho. The runway is at very high elevation, 10,084.8 feet.

== See also ==
- Transport in Lesotho
- List of airports in Lesotho
