= Qacha's Nek Airport =

Airport in Lesotho

- IATA: UNE; ICAO: FXQN

Summary
- Airport type: Public
- Serves: Qacha's Nek
- Elevation AMSL: 6,100 ft / 1,859 m
- Coordinates: 30°06′40″S 28°40′20″E

Map
- Location of the airport in Lesotho

Runways
Direction	Length		Surface
Direction	m	ft	Surface
14/32	760	2,493	Asphalt
- Source: Lesotho Govt. GCM Google Maps

Qacha's Nek Airport (IATA: UNE, ICAO: FXQN) is an airport serving Qacha's Nek, the camptown (capital) of Qacha's Nek District in Lesotho.

== See also ==
- Transport in Lesotho
- List of airports in Lesotho
