= Mantsonyane Airport =

Airport in Lesotho

Mantšonyane Airport
- IATA: none; ICAO: FXMN

Summary
- Airport type: Public
- Serves: Mantšonyane, Lesotho
- Elevation AMSL: 7,100 ft / 2,164 m
- Coordinates: 29°32′40″S 28°16′13″E

Map
- Location of the airport in Lesotho

Runways
Direction	Length		Surface
Direction	m	ft	Surface
17/35	714	2,343	Gravel
- Source: GCM Google Maps SkyVector

Mantšonyane Airport (ICAO: FXMN) is an airport serving the town of Mantšonyane in Thaba-Tseka District, Lesotho.

The runway is on a low ridge in a dry oxbow off the Mantšonyane River. There is a hill at the north end of the runway, and higher terrain in all quadrants.

The Maseru VOR-DME (Ident: MZV) is 38.4 nautical miles (71.1 km) west of the airport.

== See also ==
- Transport in Lesotho
- List of airports in Lesotho
