= Leribe Airport =

Airport in Lesotho

- IATA: LRB; ICAO: FXLR

Summary
- Airport type: Public
- Serves: Leribe/Hlotse
- Elevation AMSL: 5,350 ft / 1,631 m
- Coordinates: 28°51′20″S 28°03′10″E

Map
- Location of the airport in Lesotho

Runways
Direction	Length		Surface
Direction	m	ft	Surface
03/21	1,370	4,495	Grass
- Source: GCM Google Maps SkyVector

Leribe Airport (IATA: LRB, ICAO: FXLR) is an airport serving Hlotse, the camptown (capital) of the Leribe District of Lesotho.

The runway is in a large, open field with many cross trails, but does have some side markers along its length. It is less than 2 kilometres (1.2 mi) from the border with South Africa.

The Ficksburg non-directional beacon (Ident: FB) is 8.1 nautical miles (15.0 km) west of the airport.

== See also ==
- Transport in Lesotho
- List of airports in Lesotho
