= Semonkong Airport =

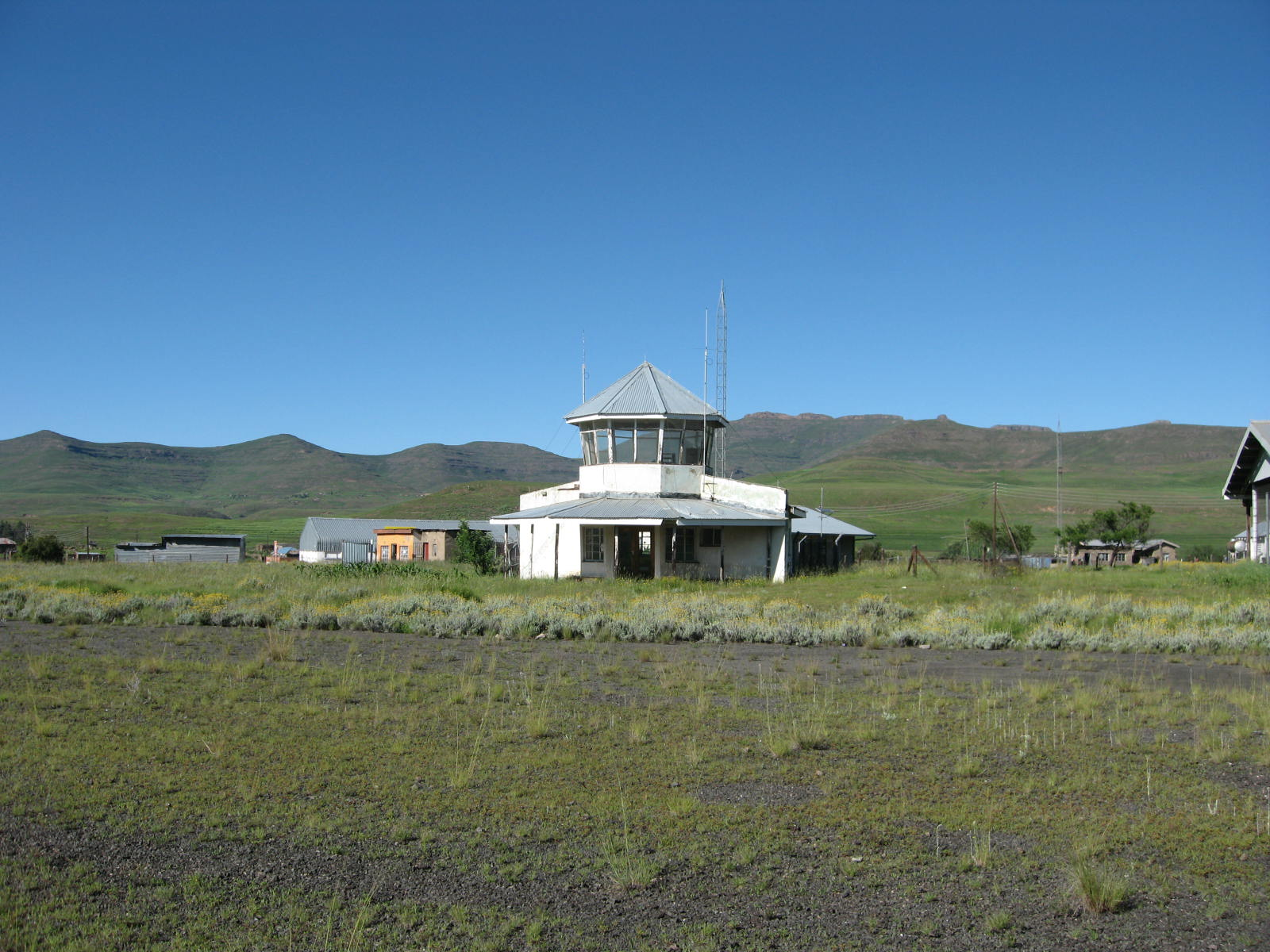
- IATA: SOK; ICAO: FXSM

Summary
- Airport type: Public
- Location: Semonkong, Lesotho
- Elevation AMSL: 7,200 ft / 2,195 m
- Coordinates: 29°50′20″S 28°03′30″E

Map
- Location of the airport in Lesotho

Runways
| Direction | Length | | Surface |
| Direction | m | ft | Surface |
|---|---|---|---|
| 08/26 | 800 | 2,625 | Asphalt |
| 12/30 | 700 | 2,297 | Gravel |
- Source: DAFIF GCM Google Maps

Semonkong Airport (IATA: SOK, ICAO: FXSM) is an airport serving the village of Semonkong in Maseru District, Lesotho.

== See also ==
- Transport in Lesotho
- List of airports in Lesotho
