= Mchinji Airport =

- IATA: none; ICAO: FWMC

Summary
- Airport type: Public
- Serves: Mchinji
- Elevation AMSL: 3,900 ft / 1,188 m
- Coordinates: 13°48′20″S 32°53′38″E

Map
- Location of the airport in Malawi

Runways
Direction	Length		Surface
Direction	ft	m	Surface
14/32	3,900	1,190	Dirt
- Sources: Google Maps

Mchinji Airport (ICAO: FWMC) is an airport serving the city of Mchinji, Republic of Malawi.

== See also ==
- Transport in Malawi
