= Gbado Airport =

- IATA: none; ICAO: FZFV

Summary
- Serves: Gbado, Democratic Republic of the Congo
- Elevation AMSL: 450 m (1,480 ft)
- Coordinates: 03°53′N 020°47′E

Map
- Location of airport in the Democratic Republic of the Congo
- Source: Great Circle Mapper

Gbado Airport (ICAO: FZFV) is an airport serving Gbado, Democratic Republic of the Congo.
