= Bolongonkele Airport =

- IATA: none; ICAO: FZBP

Summary
- Serves: Bolongonkele, Democratic Republic of the Congo
- Elevation AMSL: 353 m / 1,158 ft
- Coordinates: 02°48′00″S 019°54′30″E

Map
- Location of airport in the Democratic Republic of the Congo

Runways
Direction	Length		Surface
Direction	m	ft	Surface
	1,100	3,609
- Source: Great Circle Mapper

Bolongonkele Airport (ICAO: FZBP) is an airport serving Bolongonkele, Democratic Republic of the Congo.
