= Imesse Airport =

- IATA: none; ICAO: FZFB

Summary
- Serves: Imesse, Democratic Republic of the Congo
- Elevation AMSL: 338 m (1,109 ft)
- Coordinates: 02°31′N 018°17′E

Map
- Location of airport in the Democratic Republic of the Congo
- Source: Great Circle Mapper

Imesse Airport (ICAO: FZFB) is an airport serving Imesse, Democratic Republic of the Congo. It is located near the Ubangi River near the border with the Republic of Congo.
