= Chitipa Airport =

Airport in Malawi

- IATA: none; ICAO: FWCT

Summary
- Airport type: Public
- Serves: Chitipa
- Elevation AMSL: 4,270 ft / 1,301 m
- Coordinates: 09°42′00″S 33°16′00″E

Map
- Location of the airport in Malawi

Runways
Direction	Length		Surface
Direction	ft	m	Surface
10/28	5,900	1,798	Dirt
- Sources: Google Maps

Chitipa Airport (ICAO: FWCT) is an airport serving the town of Chitipa, Republic of Malawi.

== See also ==
- Transport in Malawi
