= Isongo Airport =

- IATA: none; ICAO: FZBH

Summary
- Serves: Isongo, Democratic Republic of the Congo
- Elevation AMSL: 311 m (1,020 ft)
- Coordinates: 01°24′S 018°24′E

Map
- Location of airport in the Democratic Republic of the Congo
- Source: Great Circle Mapper

Isongo Airport (ICAO: FZBH) is an airport serving Isongo, Democratic Republic of the Congo.
