= Matebeng =

Town in southeast Lesotho

Coordinates: 29.81033°S 27.404168°E

Matebeng is a town in southeast Lesotho, situated close to the Senqu River. It lies at the western approach to the Matebeng Pass, which links it with the town of Mavuka.
