= Kabombo Airport =

- IATA: none; ICAO: FZRD

Summary
- Serves: Kabombo
- Elevation AMSL: 600 m / 1,969 ft
- Coordinates: 7°24′10″S 28°01′53″E

Map
- Location of airport in the Democratic Republic of the Congo

Runways
Direction	Length		Surface
Direction	m	ft	Surface
closed
- Source: Google Earth

Kabombo Airport (ICAO: FZRD) was an airstrip that served Kabombo in Tanganyika Province, Democratic Republic of the Congo. The 1,200 metres (3,900 ft) dirt runway is overgrown with shrubs and some large trees. Closure date is unknown.
