= Katse Airport =

Airport in Lesotho

- IATA: none; ICAO: FXKA

Summary
- Airport type: Public
- Serves: Katse Dam
- Elevation AMSL: 7,000 ft / 2,134 m
- Coordinates: 29°21′49″S 28°31′38″E

Map
- Location of the airport in Lesotho

Runways
Direction	Length		Surface
Direction	m	ft	Surface
18/36	995	3,264	Gravel
- Source: GCM Google Maps SkyVector

Katse Airport (ICAO: FXKA) is an airport serving the Katse Dam section of the Lesotho Highlands Water Project in north-central Lesotho.

The high elevation runway has a 215 metres (705 ft) overrun on the south end, and a steep dropoff to the Malibamatso River on the north end. Some sections of the runway are built on rock fill and have no shoulder. There are hills and ravines in all quadrants.

== See also ==
- Transport in Lesotho
- List of airports in Lesotho
