= Boshwe Airport =

- IATA: none; ICAO: FZBK

Summary
- Serves: Boshwe, Democratic Republic of the Congo
- Elevation AMSL: 360 m / 1,181 ft
- Coordinates: 03°04′00″S 018°38′30″E

Map
- Location of airport in the Democratic Republic of the Congo

Runways
Direction	Length		Surface
Direction	m	ft	Surface
	1,100	3,609
- Source: Great Circle Mapper

Boshwe Airport (ICAO: FZBK) is an airport serving Boshwe, Democratic Republic of the Congo.
