= Beongo Airport =

- IATA: none; ICAO: FZEO

Summary
- Serves: Beongo, Democratic Republic of the Congo
- Elevation AMSL: 390 m / 1,280 ft
- Coordinates: 01°02′33″N 020°39′31″E

Map
- Location of airport in the Democratic Republic of the Congo

Runways
| Direction | Length | | Surface |
| Direction | m | ft | Surface |
|---|---|---|---|
| | 1,000 | 3,281 |
- Source: Great Circle Mapper

Beongo Airport (ICAO: FZEO) was an airport serving Beongo, Democratic Republic of the Congo. It was built in the 1980s for logging operations in the area. As of April 2019, the former runway is completely overgrown with trees and barely visible.
