= Songo Airport =

- IATA: none; ICAO: FQSG

Summary
- Airport type: Public
- Serves: Songo
- Elevation AMSL: 2,904 ft / 885 m
- Coordinates: 15°36′10″S 32°46′24″E

Map

Runways
Direction	Length		Surface
Direction	ft	m	Surface
17/35	2,953	900	Asphalt
- Source: Google Maps

Songo Airport (ICAO: FQSG) serves the town of Songo, Mozambique. Construction of the airport started in 1971.

== Airlines and destinations ==
Currently, there are no regularly scheduled flights.
