= Lifupa Airport =

- IATA: none; ICAO: FWLP

Summary
- Airport type: Public
- Serves: Lifupa
- Elevation AMSL: 3,360 ft / 1,024 m
- Coordinates: 13°03′00″S 33°09′00″E

Map
- Location of the airport in Malawi

Runways
Direction	Length		Surface
Direction	ft	m	Surface
18/36	3,800	1,160	Dirt
- Sources: Google Maps

Lifupa Airport (ICAO: FWLP) is an airport serving the village of Lifupa, Republic of Malawi.

== See also ==
- Transport in Malawi
