= Bau Airport =

Airport in Democratic Republic of the Congo

- IATA: none; ICAO: FZFF

Summary
- Serves: Bau, Democratic Republic of the Congo
- Elevation AMSL: 500 m (1,600 ft)
- Coordinates: 03°44′N 019°05′E

Map
- Location of airport in the Democratic Republic of the Congo

Runways
Direction	Length		Surface
Direction	m	ft	Surface
	650	2,133
- Source: Great Circle Mapper

Bau Airport (ICAO: FZFF) is an airport serving Bau, Democratic Republic of the Congo.
