= Semonkong =

- Community Council
- Geographic Center of Community
- Coordinates: 29°50′55″S 27°59′38″E
- Country: Lesotho
- District: Maseru District
- Elevation: 2,275 m (7,464 ft)

Population (2006)
  - Total: 7,781
- Time zone: UTC+2 (CAT)
- Coordinates computed from Lesotho Villages file.

Semonkong is a community council located in the Maseru District of Lesotho. Semonkong, meaning "Place of Smoke", was established in the 1880s as a refuge for Basotho displaced by the Basuto Gun War. It is located close to several major natural features, including the Maletsunyane Falls and the 3096-metre peak of Thaba Putsoa. The population in 2006 was 7,781.

== History ==
Semonkong was founded in the early 1880s by Sotho refugees who were displaced by the forces of the Cape Colony during the Basuto Gun War.

== Villages ==
The community of Semonkong includes the villages of Boitumelo, Ha Farelane, Ha Khonyeli, Ha Lentiti, Ha Lepae, Ha Lesala, Ha Lesia, Ha Leteketa, Ha Mateketa, Ha Moahloli, Ha Moahloli (Qoang), Ha Moahloli (Thusong), Ha Moqibi, Ha Motšoane, Ha Phallang, Ha Ramabanta, Ha Rasefale, Ha Seqhoasho, Ha Sethuoa-Majoe, Ha Sikeme, Ha Tlalinyana (Likoeneng), Ha Tšitso, Letlapeng, Letšeng, Mabote, Mantorina, Meeling, Moriting, Mosoang, Motse-Mocha, Pontšeng, Sekhutlong, Thaba-Chitja, Tsekana, Tšenekeng, and Tšoeu-tšoana.

== Climate ==
Climate data for Semonkong (1981–2010)
| Month | Jan | Feb | Mar | Apr | May | Jun | Jul | Aug | Sep | Oct | Nov | Dec | Year |
|---|---|---|---|---|---|---|---|---|---|---|---|---|---|
| Mean daily maximum °C (°F) | 23.0 (73.4) | 22.4 (72.3) | 20.6 (69.1) | 17.7 (63.9) | 14.6 (58.3) | 11.7 (53.1) | 12.0 (53.6) | 14.4 (57.9) | 17.9 (64.2) | 19.4 (66.9) | 20.5 (68.9) | 22.1 (71.8) | 18.0 (64.5) |
| Mean daily minimum °C (°F) | 9.1 (48.4) | 8.6 (47.5) | 6.3 (43.3) | 2.6 (36.7) | −1.6 (29.1) | −4.8 (23.4) | −5.1 (22.8) | −2.6 (27.3) | 1.4 (34.5) | 4.4 (39.9) | 6.3 (43.3) | 8.1 (46.6) | 2.7 (36.9) |
| Average rainfall mm (inches) | 102.2 (4.02) | 76.0 (2.99) | 74.2 (2.92) | 44.1 (1.74) | 22.2 (0.87) | 18.1 (0.71) | 8.6 (0.34) | 26.7 (1.05) | 23.3 (0.92) | 72.7 (2.86) | 88.5 (3.48) | 94.6 (3.72) | 651.2 (25.62) |
| Average rainy days (≥ 0.5 mm) | 14 | 11 | 12 | 8 | 4 | 3 | 2 | 3 | 4 | 10 | 11 | 13 | 95 |
Source: World Meteorological Organization

== See also ==
- Semonkong Airport
