= Mokhotlong River =

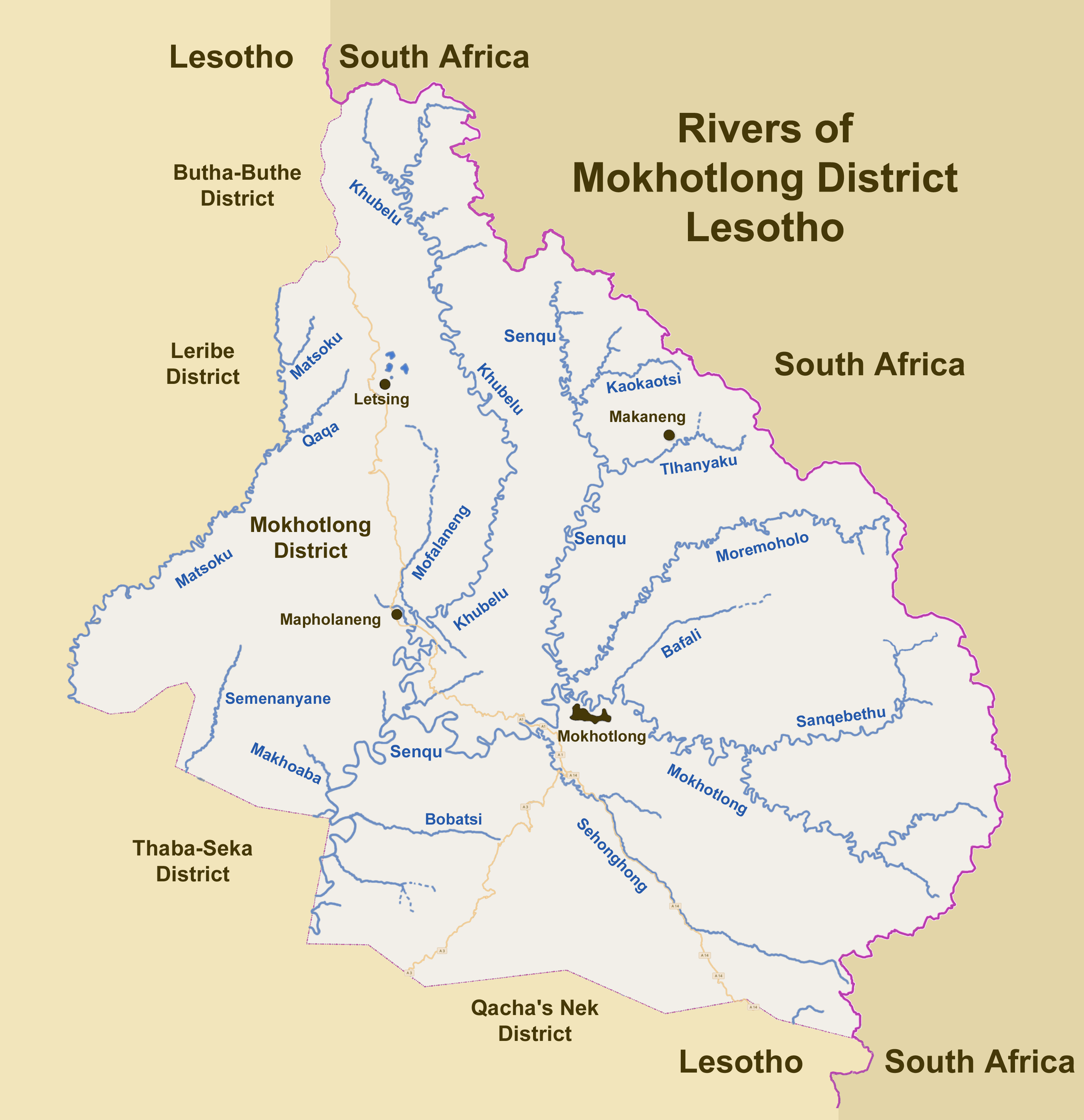
Rivers in Mohotlong District of Lesotho. Data from OpenStreetMap, Google Maps, and British Government Directorate of Overseas Surveys.

The Mokhotlong River is a river in northeastern Lesotho.

It arises as a confluence of several intermittent mountain streams near the South African border, then flows northwest to a confluence from the Sanqebethu River, then westward to its confluence into the Senqu River at the town of Mokhotlong.

== Location ==
Point	Coordinates (links to map & photo sources)	Notes
Source	29.43734°S 29.38787°E	
Sanqebethu confluence	29.31192°S 29.20346°E	
Senqu River confluence	29.26709°S 29.03753°E	
