= Sehonghong =

- Community Council
- Geographic Center of Community
- Coordinates: 29°44′38″S 28°50′06″E
- Country: Lesotho
- District: Thaba-Tseka District
- Elevation: 6,683 ft (2,037 m)

Population (2006)
  - Total: 5,814
- Time zone: UTC+2 (CAT)
- Coordinates computed from Lesotho Villages file.

Sehonghong is a community council located in the Thaba-Tseka District of Lesotho. In 2006 its population was 5,814. The village of Sehonghong is located between Taung and Matebeng on the Senqu River.

== Villages ==
The community of Sehonghong includes the villages of Aupolasi, Ha 'Molaoa, Ha Fusi, Ha Mahlatsi, Ha Makhabane, Ha Mpiko, Ha Poko, Ha Sekhaupane, Ha Setene, Ha Setontolo, Ha Tebalo, Ha Tomose, Libete Kheseng, Lebung, Liqaleng, Manganeng, Mangaung, Maputsoaneng, Masakoane, Matsikeng, `Matsòoana, Mats`olong, Moreneng, Phororong, Pote, Clarke, Sekhutloaneng, Sekoainyane, Sekokoaneng and Tlokoeng.
