= Mohlanapeng =

- Community Council
- Geographic Center of Community
- Coordinates: 29°41′51″S 28°41′41″E
- Country: Lesotho
- District: Thaba-Tseka District
- Elevation: 7,146 ft (2,178 m)

Population (2006)
  - Total: 9,882
- Time zone: UTC+2 (CAT)
- Coordinates computed from Lesotho Villages file.

Mohlanapeng is a community council located in the Thaba-Tseka District of Lesotho, south-east of the town of Thaba-Tseka. Its population in 2006 was 9,882.

== Villages ==
The community of Mohlanapeng includes the villages of Bocheletsane, Ha Lekholoane, Ha Mokoto, Ha Moralibe, Ha Nakeli, Ha Ramatšeliso, Ha Ramoliehi, Ha Rantsimane, Ha Tšiu, Koma-Koma, Lihlabaneng, Linokong, Liphakoeng, Liqonong, Maboloka, Machaping, Makere, Makoabating, Malakeng, Manganeng, Matsaile, Mohlanapeng, Motorong, Pharahlahle, Sehaula, Setanteng, Taung and Tlaling.
