= Lesobeng =

- Community Council
- Geographic Center of Community
- Coordinates: 29°45′58″S 28°23′26″E
- Country: Lesotho
- District: Thaba-Tseka District
- Elevation: 7,008 ft (2,136 m)

Population (2006)
  - Total: 12,542
- Time zone: UTC+2 (CAT)
- Coordinates computed from Lesotho Villages file.

Lesobeng is a community council located in the Thaba-Tseka District of Lesotho. Its population in 2006 was 12,542.

== Villages ==
The community of Lesobeng includes the villages of

Bareng
Boinyatso
Ha Bolese
Ha Chejana
Ha Janefeke
Ha Kao
Ha Khauhelo
Ha Khopiso
Ha Kokoana
Ha Lebusana
Ha Lephoi
Ha Letsika
Ha Mabilikoe
Ha Mahao
Ha Marumo
Ha Maseru
Ha Matsila-tsile
Ha Mohau
Ha Mojela
Ha Mokhafi
Ha Mokone
Ha Mafike
Ha Lepolesa
Ha Motsiba
Ha Matshosa
Ha Khetsi
Ha Nyope
Ha Poho
Ha Ntja
Ha Mosiroe
Ha Seoli
Ha Rahlabi
Ha Nyolo
Manganeng
Khatleng
Koeneng
Thabaneng
Ha Mokotjo
Rolong
Ha Makara
Ha Thebane
Toling
Ha Petrose
Kholokoe
Mantsaneng
Ha Matsilatsile
Phokeng Ha Semousu
Likoaring
Kueneng
Khohlong
Taung Ha Mokheseng
Ha Tsanyane
Letsatseng Ha julias
Ha Sekoala
Ha Kokoana
Ha khopiso
Phororong
Taung Ha Moletsane
Ha phefo
Ha Khomari
Ha Lali
Ha Sehlahla
Ha Motsiba
Ha Sephooko
Ha Ralisale
Sefateng

Ha Molia
Ha Molofotsane
Ha Moteba (Tutulung)
Ha Mothae
Ha Motseki
Ha Nokoane
Ha Petrose
Ha Phalole
Ha Phofu
Ha Putsoa
Ha Qobacha
Ha Ralisale
Ha Ramajalle
Ha Sephooko
Ha Tebeli
Ha Thebe-ea-Khale
Ha Tokota
Ha Tsanyane
Hleoheng

Khauoaneng
Khoaeleng
Kholokoe
Khorong
Khorosaneng
Khubetsoana
Kueneng
Leribe
Letsatseng
Likamoreng
Likoaring
Litšoeneng
Mahaheng
Mahooaneng
Makanyaneng
Makhalong
Makhina
Makoaeleng
Malalaneng

Malimong
Mantsaneng
Matsoeteng
Monameleng (Ha Sephoko)
Ntširele
Phara
Phokeng
Pontšeng
Sehlabeng
Sekokoaneng
Sekoting
Setleketseng
Taung
Thaba-Ntšo
Thepung
Tlhakoaneng
Topa
Tsekong
Tšieng

== Education ==
The Kokoana Primary School officially opened in 2008 with four teachers, 246 pupils and a reception class of about 25 children. Here are the names of schools found in Lesobeng: Khetsi Primary school (Roman Catholic)
Motsiba primary school (Roman Catholic)
Koebung Primary School (Roman Catholic)
Koebunyane Primary School(Roman Catholic)
Qhoboseaneng Primary School(Anglican)
Kokoana Primary School(Public)
Bofoma Primary School(Evangelical)
Semousu Primary School(Public)
Montmatre Primary School(Roman Catholic)
Lesobeng Secondary School(Roman Catholic)
Lesobeng Primary School(Evangelical)
Qobacha Primary School(Roman Catholic)
Letsika Primary School(Roman Catholic)
Mosiroe Primary School(Roman Catholic)
Mesoeng Primary School(Evangelical)
Mokotjane Secondary School(Public)
