= Bobete =

- Community Council
- Geographic Center of Community
- Coordinates: 29°26′36″S 28°43′03″E
- Country: Lesotho
- District: Thaba-Tseka District
- Elevation: 9,108 ft (2,776 m)

Population (2006)
  - Total: 12,966
- Time zone: UTC+2 (CAT)
- Climate: Cwb
- Coordinates computed from Lesotho Villages file.

Bobete is a community council located in the Thaba-Tseka District of Lesotho. Its population in 2006 was 12,966.

== Villages ==
The community of Bobete includes the following villages:

Bobete
Boema
Ha Heshepe
Ha Kamoli
Ha Kolahali
Ha Lebala
Ha Lephakha
Ha Leruo
Ha Maanela
Ha Malelu
Ha Ntšasa
Ha Ramokobo
Ha Theleli
Khamolane

Khohlong
Khokhothi
Khotleng
Khotolieng
Khutlo-se-nonne
Lekhalong
Letsatseng
Lichecheng
Lihlabeng
Lihloahloeng
Likomeng
Lilomong
Liphokoaneng
Lithotaneng

Mabeleng
Mabenyeng
Machakaneng
Mafikeng
Mahahleng
Mahuleng
Majakaneng
Makeneng
Makhalong (Ha Mpela)
Makhapung
Makhoatsing
Makhuleng
Malalaneng

Manokong
Mapoteng
Maqalikeng
Masaleng
Matheneng
Mathepeng
Matseleng
Matšumunyane
Mohlanapeng
Mojese
Mokhangoaneng
Moraong
Mothaleng

Noha-lia-loana
Nqobelle
Ntširele
Phaleng
Phofung
Pokalephene
Qobeng
Sekhutlong
Sekoting
Sekoting-sa-Mofao
Setoetoe
Thaba-Khubelu
Thotaneng
