= Seshote =

- Community Council
- Geographic Center of Community
- Coordinates: 29°16′14″S 28°33′05″E
- Country: Lesotho
- District: Leribe District
- Elevation: 7,963 ft (2,427 m)

Population (2006)
  - Total: 9,359
- Time zone: UTC+2 (CAT)

Seshote is a community council located in the Leribe District of Lesotho. Its population in 2006 was 9,359.

== Villages ==
The community of Seshote includes the villages of Ha Chelane, Ha Kanono, Ha Khenene, Ha Kokoana, Ha Leaooa, Ha Lelingoana, Ha Lesenya (Ha Seshote), Ha Maieane, Ha Majela, Ha Makopela, Ha Mali, Ha Matete, Ha Mathabela, Ha Mpeako, Ha Mpeli, Ha Nang, Ha Nkaobee, Ha Nkunye, Ha Ntsooa, Ha Palama, Ha Ralebese, Ha Ramanemane, Ha Ramoji, Ha Seemane, Ha Sehloho (Ha Theko), Ha Sekereu (Bochabela), Ha Sekutlu, Ha Theko, Ha Tšehla, Khokhobe, Lihlabeng (Ha Theko), Linyokong, Mahateng, Mapeleng, Mashaleng (Ha Seshote), Ntširele, Patuoe, Phukheng, Seloloana (Khopung) and Thepung (Ha Maieane).
