= Thaba-Tseka =

Coordinates: 29°32′S 28°36′E

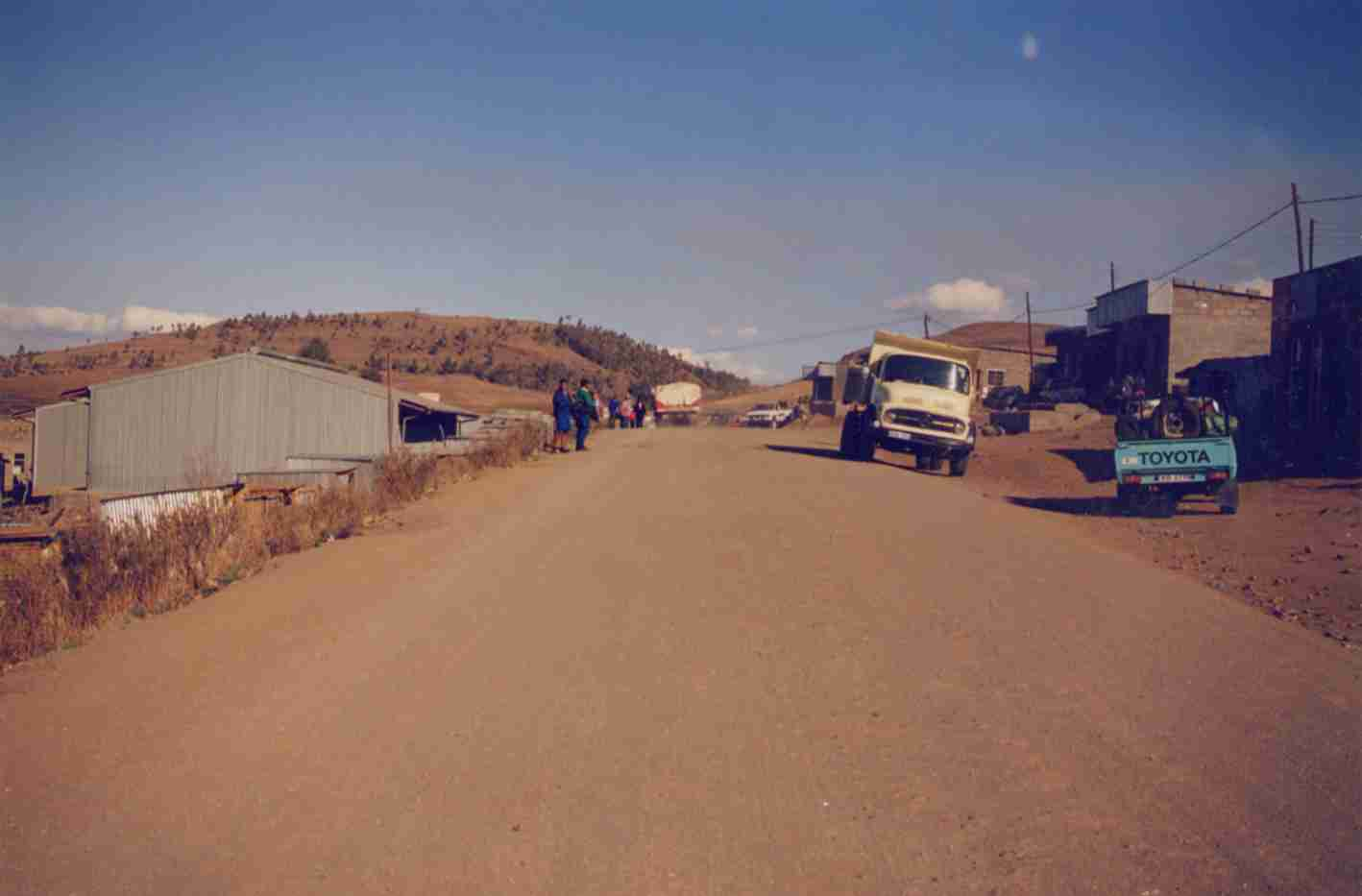
- Main street of Thaba-Tseka

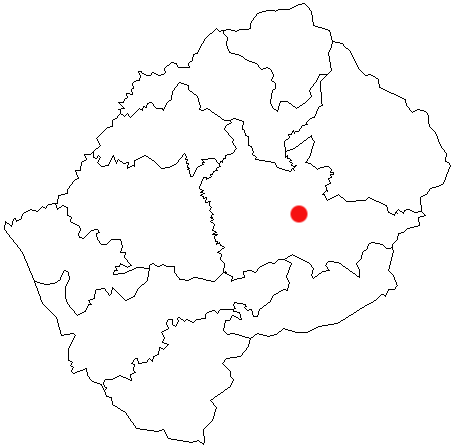
- Location of Thaba-Tseka in Lesotho
- Country: Lesotho
- Elevation: 2,200 m (7,200 ft)

Population (2016)
  - Total: 15,248
- Time zone: UTC+2 (SAST)

Thaba-Tseka is a constituency and the capital city or camptown of the Thaba-Tseka District in eastern Lesotho. It has a population of 15,248 (2016 census).

Thaba-Tseka was also the subject of the case studies in James Ferguson's book The Anti-Politics Machine, which identified the failures of outside-initiated development projects, which he calls the "development discourse fantasy".

Famous people include Maaparankoe Mahao, a former military general for the Lesotho Army

== Infrastructure ==
In Thaba-Tseka, there are shopping facilities, a bank, a post office, various institutions of relief organizations, and a hospital.

== Climate ==
Climate data for Thaba-Tseka (1981–2010)
Month	Jan	Feb	Mar	Apr	May	Jun	Jul	Aug	Sep	Oct	Nov	Dec	Year
Mean daily maximum °C (°F)	23.7 (74.7)	23.0 (73.4)	21.4 (70.5)	18.8 (65.8)	15.6 (60.1)	13.3 (55.9)	13.3 (55.9)	16.0 (60.8)	19.2 (66.6)	20.8 (69.4)	21.8 (71.2)	23.1 (73.6)	19.2 (66.5)
Mean daily minimum °C (°F)	11.2 (52.2)	10.7 (51.3)	9.0 (48.2)	5.8 (42.4)	2.7 (36.9)	−0.8 (30.6)	−1.0 (30.2)	1.5 (34.7)	5.3 (41.5)	7.4 (45.3)	8.7 (47.7)	10.2 (50.4)	5.9 (42.6)
Average rainfall mm (inches)	101.7 (4.00)	83.9 (3.30)	80.7 (3.18)	36.1 (1.42)	11.4 (0.45)	9.5 (0.37)	4.1 (0.16)	23.2 (0.91)	23.9 (0.94)	71.3 (2.81)	80.1 (3.15)	79.6 (3.13)	605.5 (23.82)
Average rainy days (≥ 0.5 mm)	13	11	12	7	3	2	1	3	4	10	11	11	88
Source: World Meteorological Organization
