= Transport in Lesotho =

This article concerns systems of transport in Lesotho. As a landlocked country, Lesotho has no seaports or harbours, but does have road, air transport, and limited rail infrastructure.

== Roads ==
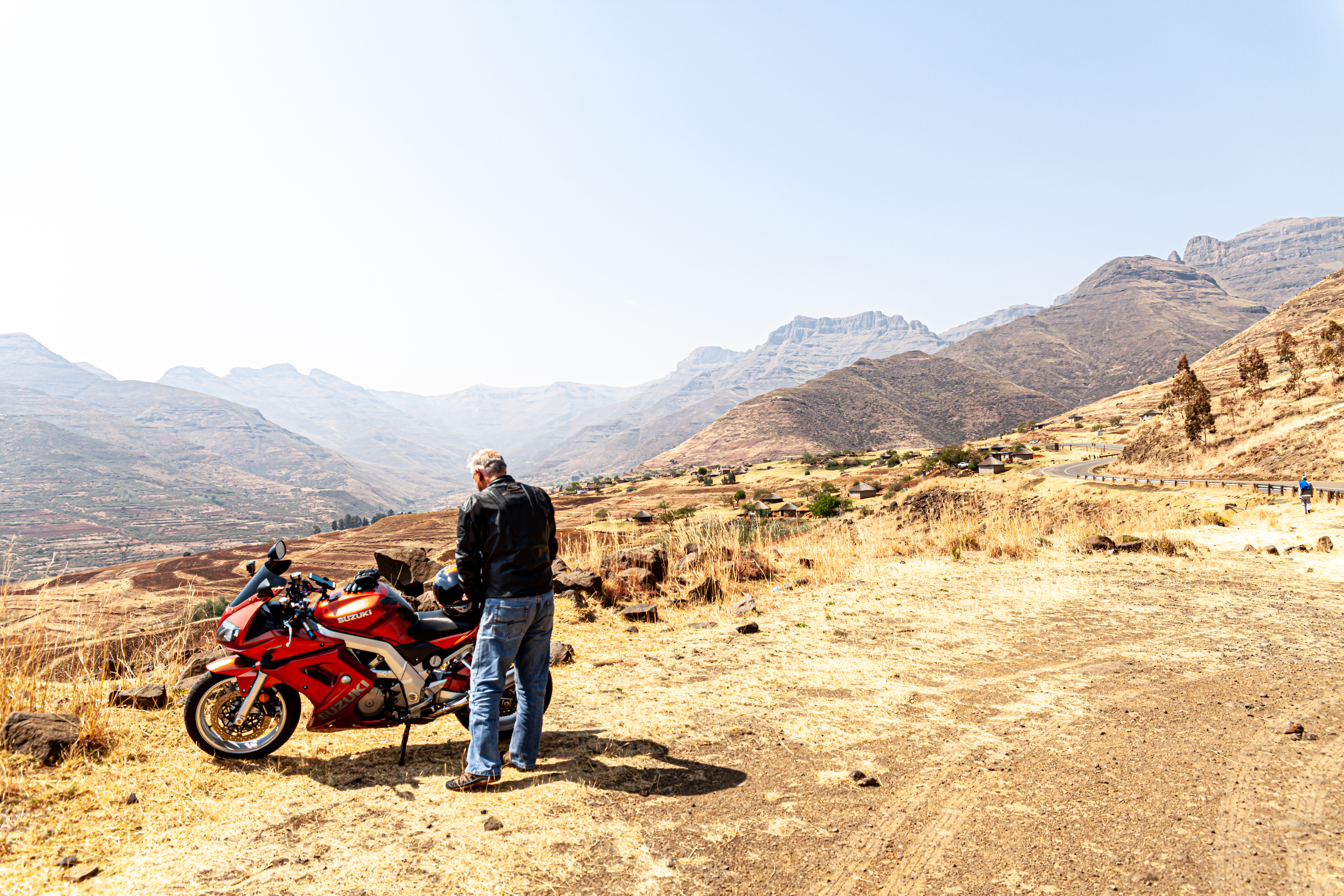
A3 road towards Katse.

Prior to Lesotho's independence in 1966, the only paved road in the country was the Kingsway in the capital, Maseru, between the Mejametalana Airport and the Royal Palace. Since the early 1970s, the road infrastructure has been substantially developed. In 1999, Lesotho had a road network measuring at 5,940 kilometres (3,690 mi) in length, of which 1,087 kilometres (675 mi) were paved. The most weight has been given to connecting the district centres, but the roads within central Lesotho have also been improved, as part of the construction needs of the Lesotho Highlands Water Project.

== Railways ==
The only railway line in Lesotho is the Maseru branch line, which connects the capital city Maseru to the Bloemfontein–Bethlehem line in the railway network of South Africa. The final 1.6 kilometres (1.0 mi) of this line, which opened on 18 December 1905, lies within the borders of Lesotho, running from the border bridge on the Mohokare River through the northern industrial district of Maseru to that city's station, the only railway station in the country.

As of 2008, there have been talks of building new railways to connect Lesotho to Durban and Port Elizabeth.

== Air transport ==
There are a total of 28 airports in Lesotho, of which 3 have paved runways. The only international airport is the Moshoeshoe I International Airport in Mazenod, a short distance southeast from Maseru. The main runway of the Moshoeshoe Airport is the only one with a runway longer than 1,523 meters; it measures at 3,200 meters.

Of the other airports, one has a paved runway between 914 and 1,523 meters in length and one a paved runway with a length of under 914 meters. Four of the airports have unpaved runways of between 914 and 1,523 meters in length, and the others have unpaved runways of less than 914 meters. All of the classifications are made by the length of the longest runway on an airport.

== Water transport ==
Lesotho is landlocked and completely dependent on South Africa for sea transport. The nearest major port and the transshipping point for the country is Durban. Recently due to delays out of Durban more companies have been using the Port Elizabeth facilities that are 2 hours farther south.

Inland water transport is limited to small ferry boats at river crossings, and the Government of Lesotho operates boats at major crossings.

== Intermediate means of transport ==
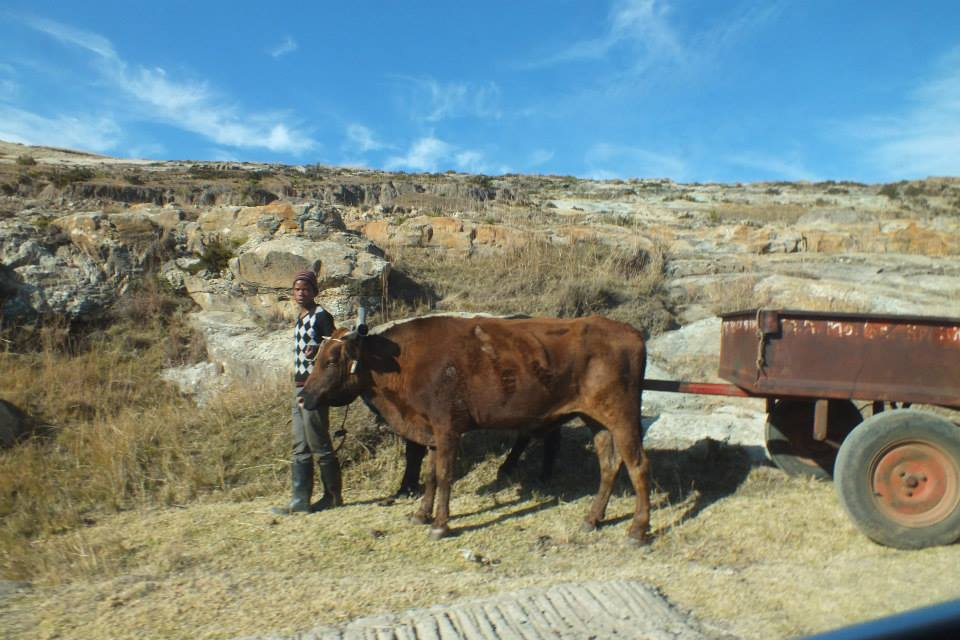
Cattle work in Lesotho

The main intermediate means of transport (IMTs) in use are wheelbarrows and work animals. Wheelbarrows are widespread in the urban and rural areas and are commonly used by women and men to transport food aid, grains for milling, water containers, and building materials. The importance of wheelbarrows for water collection is gradually being reduced by the provision of water taps. Also common in both highland and lowland areas are two-wheeled ‘scotch carts' with pneumatic tyres. They used to be pulled mainly by oxen, but in recent years there has been an increasing tendency to use cows (females), as farmers often do not own oxen. The carts vary in design, some being made with old pickup bodies, some made using old axles, and many being purpose-made to standard designs by small workshops in Lesotho or South Africa. Most are painted red. Discussion with workshops producing carts suggest the main problem is obtaining suitable wheels and axles, as well as other raw materials, that can be afforded by their clients.

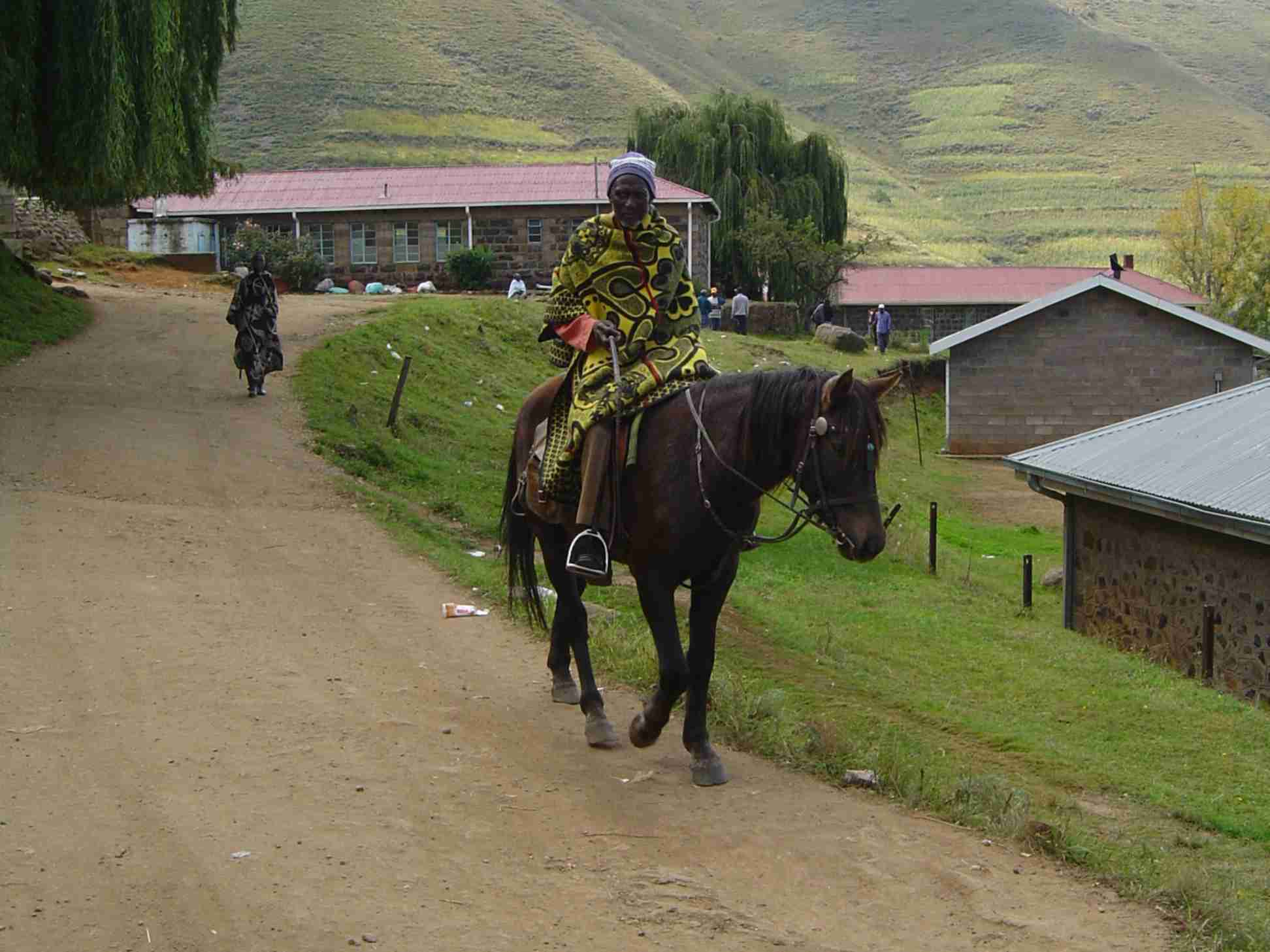
Horse riding.

Basotho ponies are very important in the highlands for riding. Ponies are sometimes used as pack animals to carry goods, but this is relatively uncommon. Donkeys, on the other hand are widely used as pack animals in all parts of the county. Donkeys are quite commonly ridden, mainly by young men and usually without a saddle. It is quite common for women to ride ponies, but relatively few women ride donkeys. A few people, notably older men, ride donkeys fitted with saddles. Mules are relatively uncommon, and may be used for riding or pack transport. The use of ponies, mules and donkeys to pull carts is very low. Very few two-wheeled donkey carts or horse carts, although such carts are very common in other countries in southern, eastern, western and northern Africa. In at least two urban areas (Maputsoe and Mafeteng) a small number of transport entrepreneurs use carts or wagons with pneumatic tyres pulled mainly by single ponies (and occasionally by two donkeys or a mule). In Mafeteng, the transporters use two-wheel carts, while in Maputsoe, the transporters use four-wheel wagons.

The numbers of bicycles and motorcycles in use is very low. The per-capita ownership of motorcycles in Lesotho, and also bicycles, may be among the lowest in the world. The small number of people who do use bicycles tend to be children and young men, primarily for recreation although some use them for inter-village travel. A few people use bicycles for sport, and some South Africans and other tourists travel through the highlands on bicycles. A small number of transport entrepreneurs use bicycles to gain a livelihood.
