= Highway =

Public road or other public way on land

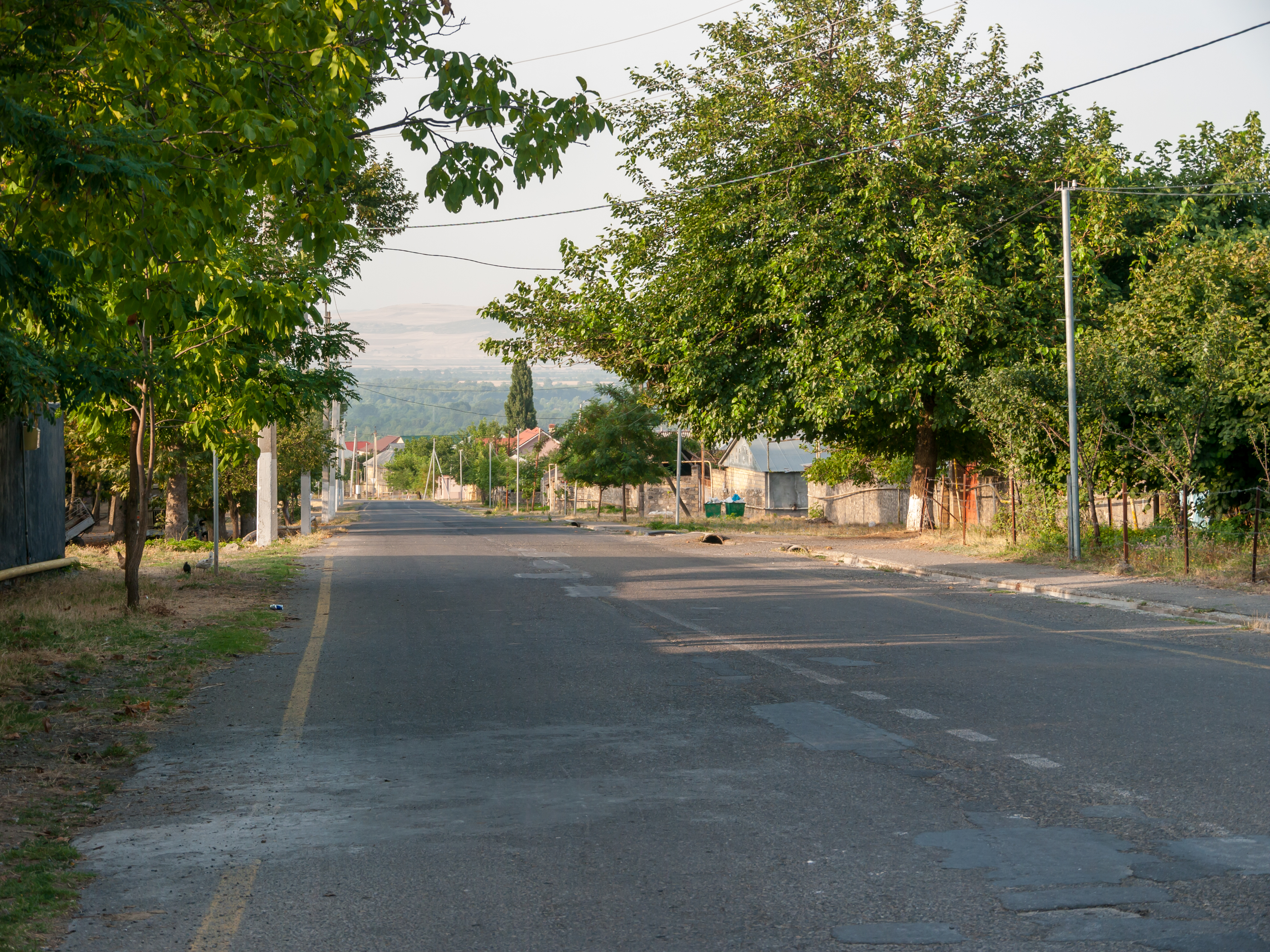
A street in Oğuz, Azerbaijan

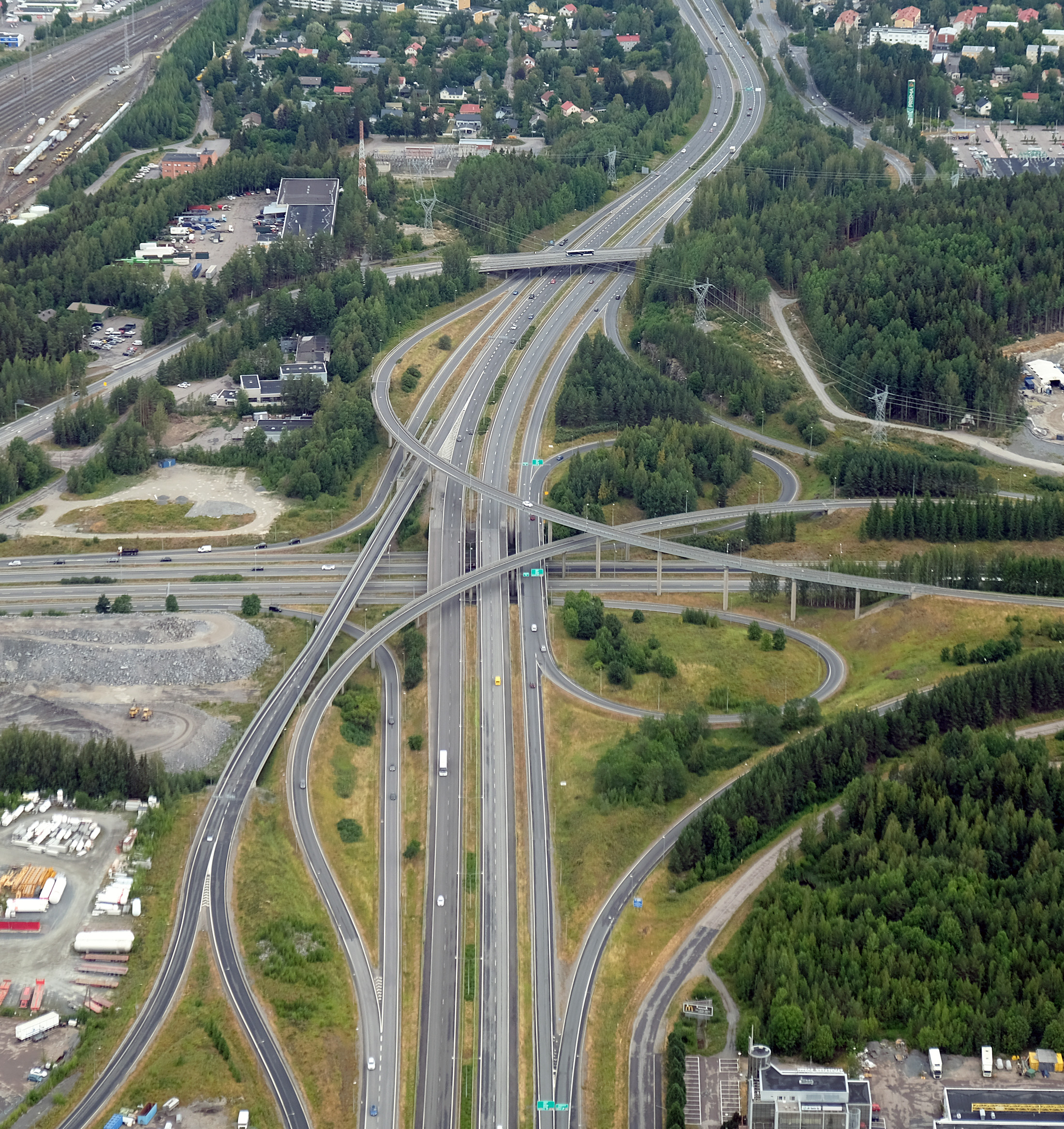
An aerial view of the Lakalaiva interchange in the Tampere Ring Road between the Highway 3 (E12) and Highway 9 (E63) near city of Tampere

A highway in the broadest sense of the term is any public or private road or other public way on land, including not just major roads but also other public roads and rights of way. In the United States, the term is used to describe major roads. It is sometimes used casually as a synonym of freeway, or expressway, denoting a controlled-access highway.

According to Merriam-Webster, the use of the term predates the 12th century. According to Etymonline, "high" is in the sense of "main".

In North American and Australian English, major roads such as controlled-access highways or arterial roads are often state highways (Canada: provincial highways). Other roads may be designated "county highways" in the US and Ontario. These classifications refer to the level of government (state, provincial, county) that maintains the roadway. In British English, "highway" is primarily a legal term. Everyday use normally implies roads, while the legal use covers any route or path with a public right of access, including footpaths etc.

The term has led to several related derived terms, including highway system, highway code, highway patrol and highwayman.

== Overview ==
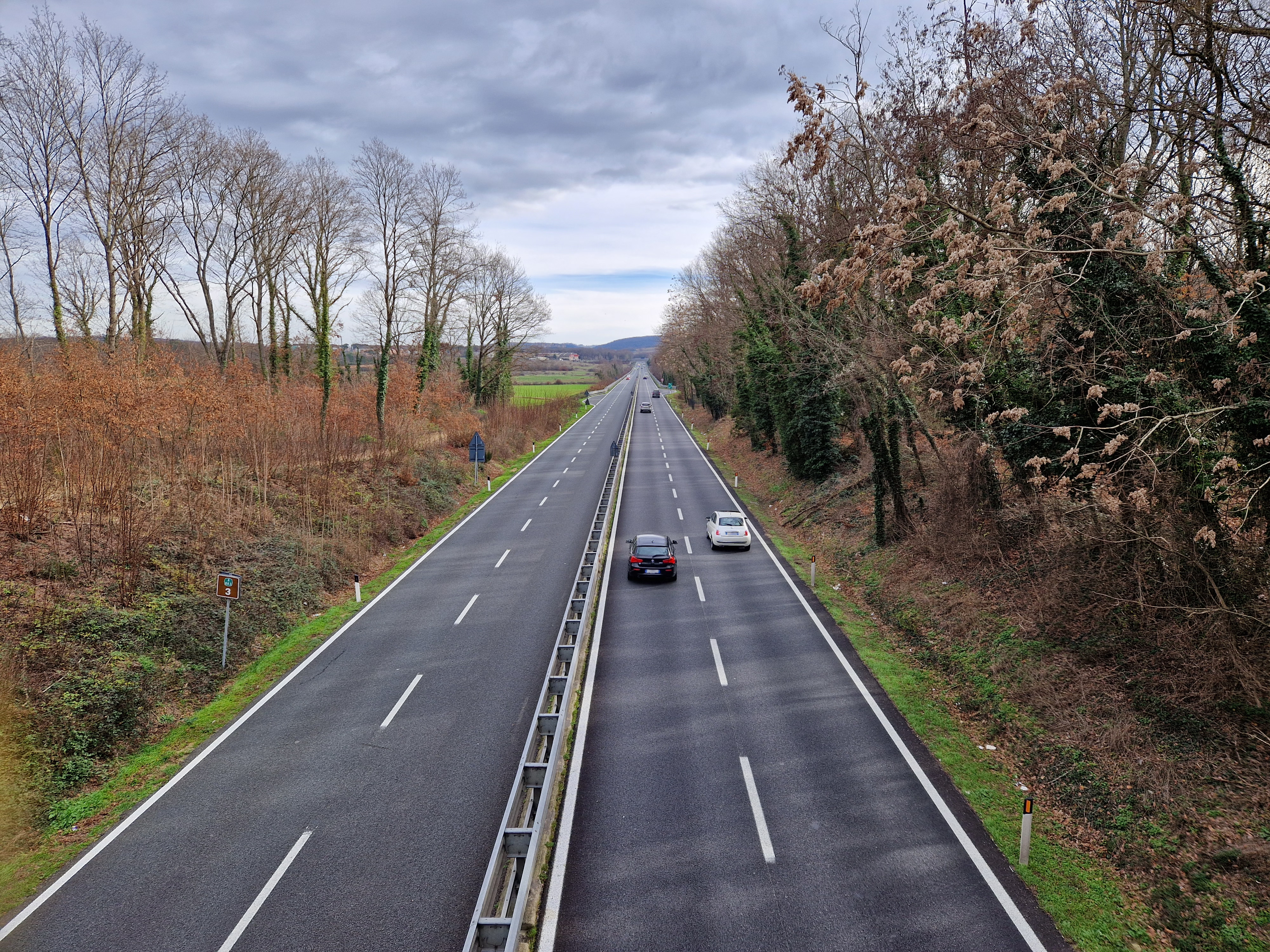
Raccordo autostradale RA3 In Italy, which connects the Tuscan cities of Florence and Siena

Major highways are often named and numbered by the governments that typically develop and maintain them. Australia's Highway 1 is the longest national highway in the world at over 14,500 kilometres (9,000 mi) and runs almost the entire way around the continent. China has the world's largest network of highways, followed closely by the United States. Some highways, like the Pan-American Highway or the European routes, span multiple countries. Some major highway routes include ferry services, such as US Route 10, which crosses Lake Michigan.

Traditionally highways were used by people on foot or on horses. Later they also accommodated carriages, bicycles and eventually motor cars, facilitated by advancements in road construction. In the 1920s and 1930s, many nations began investing heavily in highway systems in an effort to spur commerce and bolster national defence.

Major highways that connect cities in populous developed and developing countries usually incorporate features intended to enhance the road's capacity, efficiency, and safety to various degrees. Such features include a reduction in the number of locations for user access, the use of dual carriageways with two or more lanes on each carriageway, and grade-separated junctions with other roads and modes of transport. These features are typically present on highways built as motorways (freeways).

== Terminology ==
=== England and Wales ===
The general legal definition deals with right of use, not the form of construction; this is distinct from e.g. the popular use of the word in the US. A highway is defined in English common law by a number of similarly worded definitions such as "a way over which all members of the public have the right to pass and repass without hindrance" usually accompanied by "at all times"; ownership of the ground is for most purposes irrelevant, thus the term encompasses all such ways from the widest trunk roads in public ownership to the narrowest footpath providing unlimited pedestrian access over private land.

A highway might be open to all forms of lawful land traffic (e.g. vehicular, horse, pedestrian) or limited to specific modes of traffic; usually a highway available to vehicles is also available to foot or horse traffic, a highway available to horse traffic is available to cyclists and pedestrians; but there are exceptional cases in which a highway is only available to vehicles, or is subdivided into dedicated parallel sections for different users.

A highway can share ground with a private right of way for which full use is not available to the general public: for example farm roads which the owner may use for any purpose but for which the general public only has a right of use on foot or horseback. The status of highway on most older roads has been gained by established public use, while newer roads are typically dedicated as highways from the time they are adopted (taken into the care and control of a council or other public authority). In England and Wales, a public highway is also known as "The King's Highway".

The core definition of a highway is modified in various legislation for a number of purposes but only for the specific matters dealt with in each such piece of legislation. This is typically in the case of bridges, tunnels and other structures whose ownership, mode of use or availability would otherwise exclude them from the general definition of a highway. Recent examples include toll bridges and tunnels which have the definition of highway imposed upon them (in a legal order applying only to the individual structure) to allow application of most traffic laws to those using them but without causing all of the general obligations or rights of use otherwise applicable to a highway.

Limited access highways for vehicles, with their own traffic rules, are called "motorways" in the UK.

=== Scotland ===
Scots law is similar to English law with regard to highways but with differing terminology and legislation. What is defined in England as a highway will often in Scotland be what is defined by s.151 Roads (Scotland) Act 1984 (but only "in this act" although other legislation could imitate) simply as a road, that is:

- "any way (other than a waterway) over which there is a public right of passage (by whatever means [and whether subject to a toll or not]) and includes the road's verge, and any bridge (whether permanent or temporary) over which, or tunnel through which, the road passes; and any reference to a road includes a part thereof"

The word highway is itself no longer a statutory expression in Scots law but remains in common law.

=== United States ===
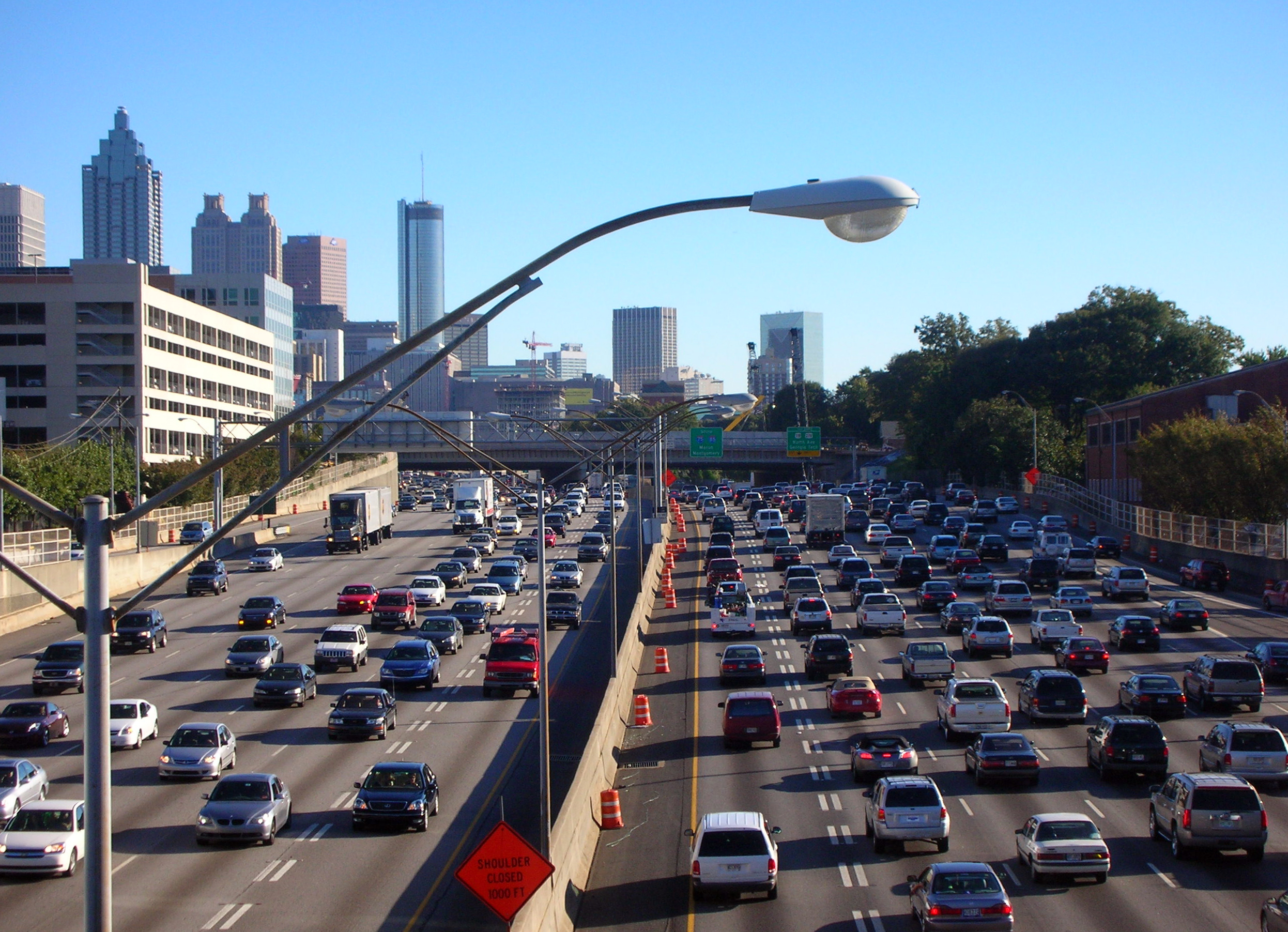
The I-75/I-85 Downtown Connector in Atlanta, Georgia, in the United States

In American law, the word "highway" is sometimes used to denote any public way used for travel, whether a "road, street, and parkway"; however, in practical and useful meaning, a "highway" is a major and significant, well-constructed road that is capable of carrying reasonably heavy to extremely heavy traffic. Highways generally have a route number designated by the state and federal departments of transportation.

California Vehicle Code, Sections 360, 590, define a "highway" as only a way open for use by motor vehicles, but the California Supreme Court has held that "the definition of 'highway' in the Vehicle Code is used for special purposes of that act" and that canals of the Los Angeles neighborhood of Venice are "highways" that are entitled to be maintained with state highway funds.

== History ==
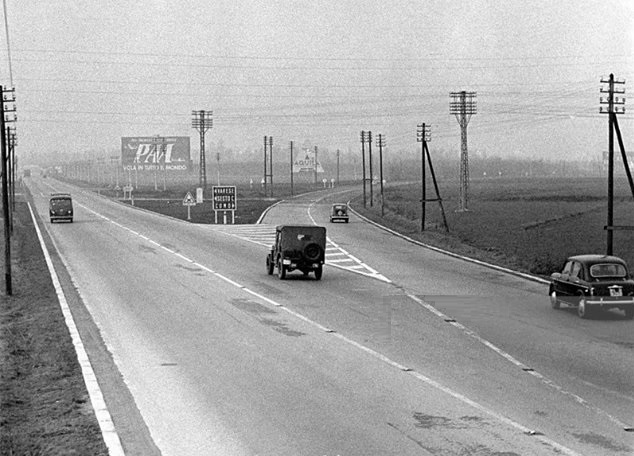
The Italian Autostrada dei Laghi ("Lakes Highway" in the 1950s; now parts of the Autostrada A8 and the Autostrada A9), the first controlled-access highway ever built in the world

Large scale highway systems developed in the 20th century as automobile usage increased. The first United States limited-access road was constructed on Long Island, New York, and known as the Long Island Motor Parkway or the Vanderbilt Motor Parkway. It was completed in 1911. It included many modern features, including banked turns, guard rails and reinforced concrete tarmac. Traffic could turn left between the parkway and connectors, crossing oncoming traffic, so it was not a controlled-access highway (or "freeway" as later defined by the federal government's Manual on Uniform Traffic Control Devices).

Italy was the first country in the world to build controlled-access highways reserved for fast traffic and for motor vehicles only. The Autostrada dei Laghi ("Lakes Highway"), the first built in the world, connecting Milan to Lake Como and Lake Maggiore, and now parts of the A8 and A9 highways, was devised by Piero Puricelli and was inaugurated in 1924. This highway, called autostrada, contained only one lane in each direction and no interchanges.

The Southern State Parkway opened in 1927, while the Long Island Motor Parkway was closed in 1937 and replaced by the Northern State Parkway (opened 1931) and the contiguous Grand Central Parkway (opened 1936). In Germany, construction of the Bonn-Cologne Autobahn began in 1929 and was opened in 1932 by Konrad Adenauer, then the mayor of Cologne. Soon the Autobahn was the first limited-access, high-speed road network in the world, with the first section from Frankfurt am Main to Darmstadt opening in 1935.

In the US, the Federal Aid Highway Act of 1921 (Phipps Act) enacted a fund to create an extensive highway system. In 1922, the first blueprint for a national highway system (the Pershing Map) was published. The Federal Aid Highway Act of 1956 allocated $25 billion for the construction of the 66,000-kilometre-long (41,000 mi) Interstate Highway System over a 20-year period.

In Great Britain, the Special Roads Act 1949 provided the legislative basis for roads for restricted classes of vehicles and non-standard or no speed limits applied (later mostly termed motorways but now with speed limits not exceeding 70 mph); in terms of general road law this legislation overturned the usual principle that a road available to vehicular traffic was also available to horse or pedestrian traffic as is usually the only practical change when non-motorways are reclassified as special roads. The first section of motorway in the UK opened in 1958 (part of the M6 motorway) and then in 1959 the first section of the M1 motorway.

== Design ==
=== Classification ===
In the United States, Federal Highway Administration classifies highways into the following categories:

- Principal arterial (freeways and expressways, and other), which can be further recognized in urban and rural forms
- Minor arterial
- Collector (major, minor), which can be further recognized in urban and rural forms
- Local

This classification is based on the concept of accessibility and mobility. High mobility roads are considered arterial roads, roads with high accessibility are considered local roads, while those balancing between mobility and accessibility are called collectors.

Similarly in Europe, the European Commission defines the road categories as:

- Arterial / through traffic flow routes (motorways, express roads, and some urban ring roads) are roads with a flow function, which encourage efficient throughput of (long distance) motor vehicles and can be further divided to primary and local arterials.
- Distributor roads are roads with an area distribution function which permits transition from residential, industrial, recreational areas to scattered destinations. These roads can be further divided to primary and local distributors.
- Access roads are roads with an access function, allowing actual access to road-side properties.

=== Metrics ===
There are three speed performance measures for highways:

- Free-flow speed: a speed selected by most drivers when they are driving alone on the subject highway with green lights, but facing other restrictions such as pedestrians, parking, and road geometrics. Free-flow speed reflects the driving "environment" and may vary by the time of the day.
- Running speed / average running speed: average vehicle speed while in motion, which might be 5–10 mph (8.0–16.1 km/h) slower than free flow speed.
- Average travel speed: actual traveling speed, a metric used for determining the subject highway's level of service.

An additional metric involves delays. Control delays are delays caused by traffic control devices. According to Highway Capacity Manual, control delay at a signalized intersection may be calculated as a sum of uniform delay, incremental delay, and initial queue delay:
$$\text{DELAY}_\text{control} = \text{DELAY}_\text{uniform} + \text{DELAY}_\text{incremental} + \text{DELAY}_\text{initial queue}$$
where:

- $\text{DELAY}_\text{uniform} = \frac{0.5C\left(1 - \frac{g}{C}\right)^{2}}{1-\min(1,X)\frac{g}{C}} \times f_\text{progression}$
- $\text{DELAY}_\text{incremental} = 900T\left[(X-1) + \sqrt{(X-1)^2 + \frac{8kIX}{cT}}\right]$
- $\text{DELAY}_\text{initial queue}$ = delay due to pre-existing queue before the next arrival, seconds per vehicle
- $C$ = cycle length, s
- $g$ = effective green time, s
- $X$ = volume-to-capacity ratio
- $f_\text{progression}$ = progression adjustment factor, to account for the timing of traffic arriving in platoon, and decreases as the platoon arrival performance increases
- $T$ = duration of analysis period, hour
- $k$ = incremental delay adjustment for actuated control
- $I$ = incremental delay adjustment for upstream signals filtering and equals to 1.0 when the intersection is isolated
- $c$ = capacity of the lane group, vehicle per hour

=== Preservation of highway functions ===
As local community grows, the function of the highway may get degraded. To maintain a good balance between accessibility and mobility, design methods such as access management, context sensitive design, transit-oriented development, travel demand management, and corridor management planning are used. Some of the enhancements are done during future rehabilitation projects after the highway constructions are finished, especially for the right-of-way arterial highways.

To minimize local activities' disruptions to the arterial roads, some arterials have frontage road to separate from these activities.

== Social effects ==
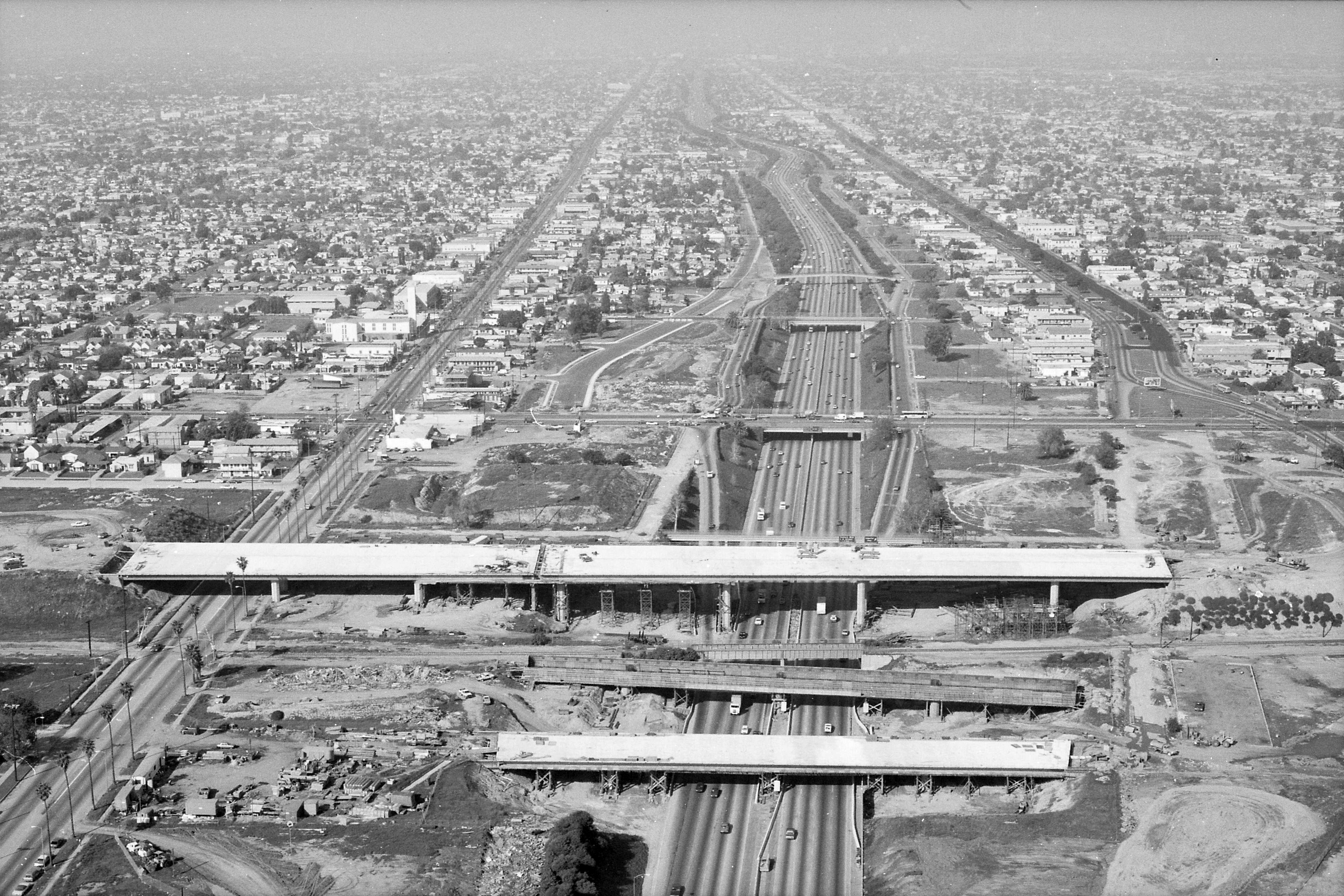
The construction of Harbor Freeway, and its subsequent displacement of homes in Los Angeles, California.

Often reducing travel times relative to city or town streets, highways with limited access and grade separation can create increased opportunities for people to travel for business, trade or pleasure and also provide trade routes for goods. Highways can reduce commute and other travel time but additional road capacity can also release latent traffic demand. If not accurately predicted at the planning stage, this extra traffic may lead to the new road becoming congested sooner than would otherwise be anticipated by considering increases in vehicle ownership. More roads allow drivers to use their cars when otherwise alternatives may have been sought, or the journey may not have been made, which can mean that a new road brings only short-term mitigation of traffic congestion.

The use of "Redlining" often would dictate where in cities highways would go through.

Where highways are created through existing communities, there can be reduced community cohesion and more difficult local access. Consequently, property values have decreased in many cutoff neighborhoods, leading to decreased housing quality over time. Mostly in the U.S., many of these effects are from racist planning practices from before the advent of civil rights. This would result in the vast majority of displacement and social effects mostly going to people like African Americans.

In recent times, the use of freeway removal or the public policy of urban planning to demolish freeways and create mixed-use urban areas, parks, residential, commercial, or other land uses is being popular in many cities to combat most of the social problems caused from highways.

== Economic effects ==
Graphs showing costs and benefits of highway building.

In transport, demand can be measured in numbers of journeys made or in total distance travelled across all journeys (e.g. passenger-kilometres for public transport or vehicle-kilometres of travel (VKT) for private transport). Supply is considered to be a measure of capacity. The price of the good (travel) is measured using the generalised cost of travel, which includes both money and time expenditure.

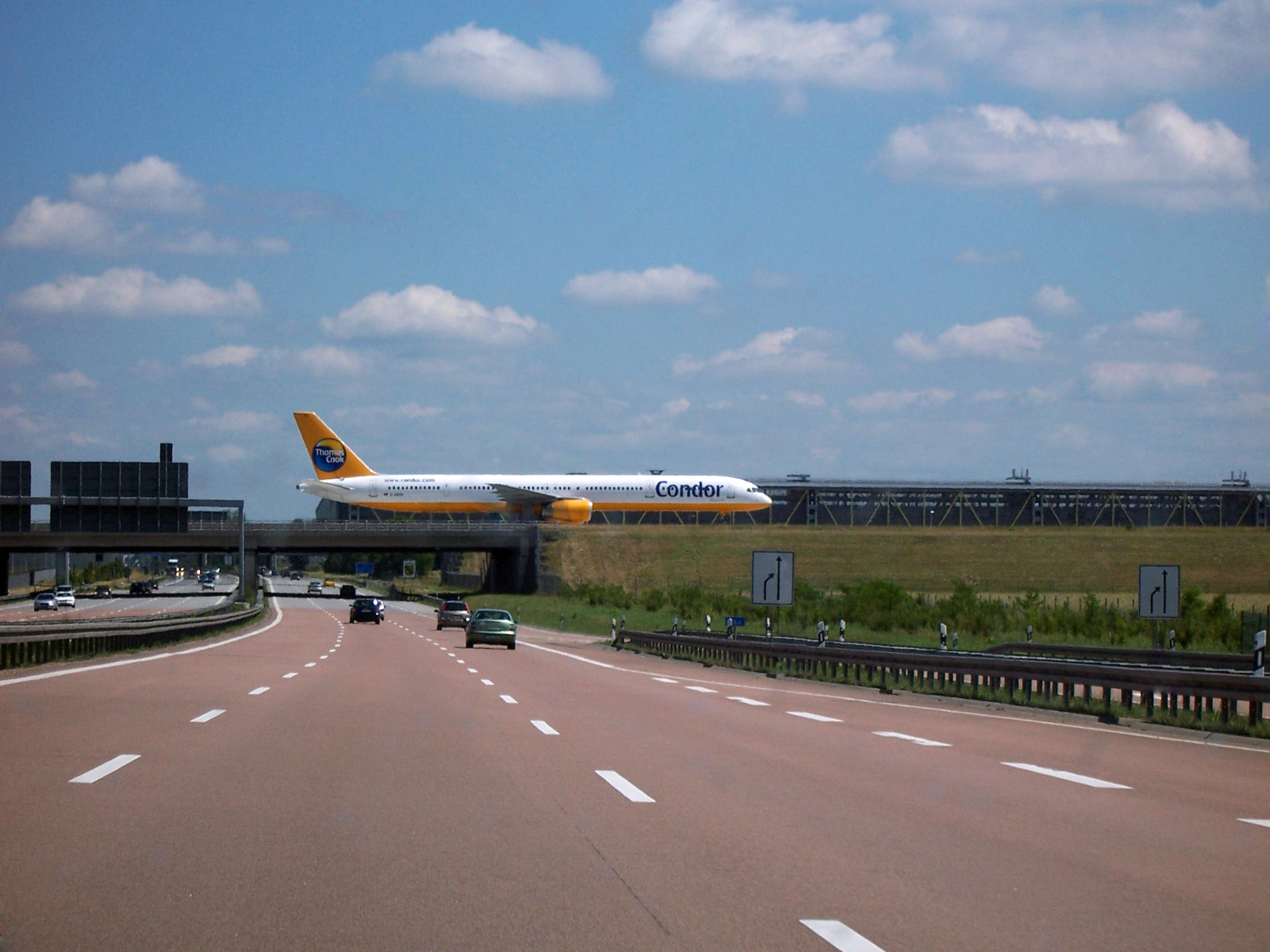
A taxiway crossing the Autobahn, near Leipzig

The effect of increases in supply (capacity) are of particular interest in transport economics (see induced demand), as the potential environmental consequences are significant (see externalities below).

In addition to providing benefits to their users, transport networks impose both positive and negative externalities on non-users. The consideration of these externalities—particularly the negative ones—is a part of transport economics. Positive externalities of transport networks may include the ability to provide emergency services, increases in land value and agglomeration benefits. Negative externalities are wide-ranging and may include local air pollution, noise pollution, light pollution, safety hazards, community severance and congestion. The contribution of transport systems to potentially hazardous climate change is a significant negative externality which is difficult to evaluate quantitatively, making it difficult (but not impossible) to include in transport economics-based research and analysis. Congestion is considered a negative externality by economists.

A 2016 study found that for the United States, "a 10% increase in a region's stock of highways causes a 1.7% increase in regional patenting over a five-year period." A 2021 study found that areas that obtained access to a new highway experienced a substantial increase in top-income taxpayers and a decline in low-income taxpayers. Highways also contributed to job and residential urban sprawl.

== Environmental effects ==
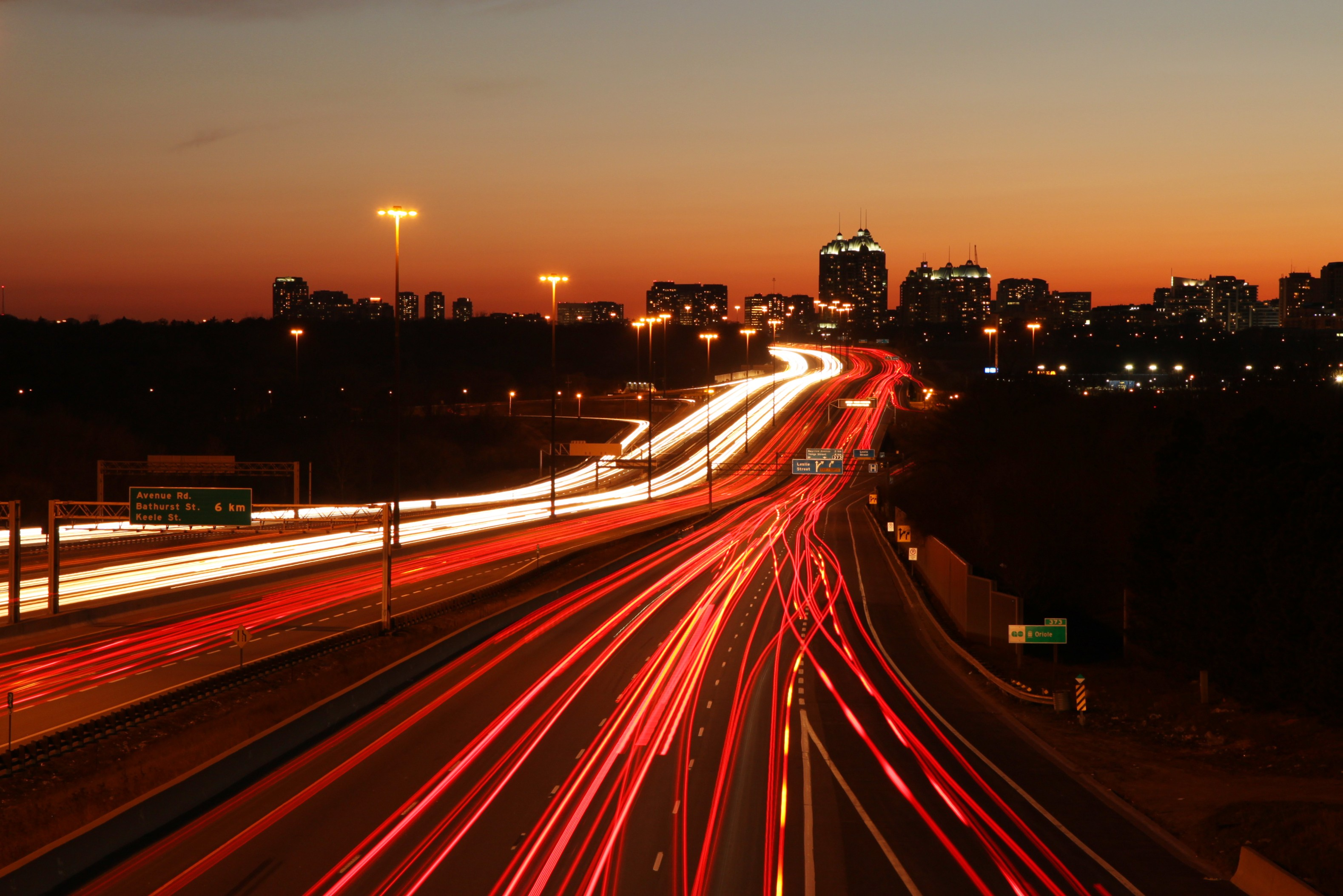
Noise, light and air pollution are negative environmental effects highways can have on their surroundings.

Highways are extended linear sources of pollution.

Roadway noise increases with operating speed so major highways generate more noise than arterial streets. Therefore, considerable noise health effects are expected from highway systems. Noise mitigation strategies exist to reduce sound levels at nearby sensitive receptors. The idea that highway design could be influenced by acoustical engineering considerations first arose about 1973.

Air quality issues: Highways may contribute fewer emissions than arterials carrying the same vehicle volumes. This is because high, constant-speed operation creates an emissions reduction compared to vehicular flows with stops and starts. However, concentrations of air pollutants near highways may be higher due to increased traffic volumes. Therefore, the risk of exposure to elevated levels of air pollutants from a highway may be considerable, and further magnified when highways have traffic congestion.

New highways can also cause habitat fragmentation, encourage urban sprawl and allow human intrusion into previously untouched areas, as well as (counterintuitively) increasing congestion, by increasing the number of intersections.

They can also reduce the use of public transport, indirectly leading to greater pollution.

High-occupancy vehicle lanes are being added to some newer/reconstructed highways in the United States and other countries around the world to encourage carpooling and mass transit. These lanes help reduce the number of cars on the highway and thus reduces pollution and traffic congestion by promoting the use of carpooling in order to be able to use these lanes. However, they tend to require dedicated lanes on a highway, which makes them difficult to construct in dense urban areas where they are the most effective.

To address habitat fragmentation, wildlife crossings have become increasingly popular in many countries. Wildlife crossings allow animals to safely cross human-made barriers like highways.

Highways may have some positive impact on nature only in the distant future:

- They can prevent the spread of forest and steppe fires;
- High-speed roads contribute to urbanization, in which millions of people move to richer large cities, and thousands of abandoned small impoverished settlements gradually disappear and become overgrown with dense forests;
- Thanks to expressways, not only the material well-being of the population of poorly developed countries is improving, but even its traditional culture is changing. Freed from age-old prejudices, highly educated and independent women in these countries tend not to burden themselves with heavy family responsibilities and rarely give birth to children, which is why the demography of the Earth may decrease, which will ease the burden on the ecology.

== Road traffic safety ==
Road traffic safety describes the safety performance of roads and streets, and methods used to reduce the harm (deaths, injuries, and property damage) on the highway system from traffic collisions. It includes the design, construction and regulation of the roads, the vehicles used on them and the training of drivers and other road-users.

A report published by the World Health Organization in 2004 estimated that some 1.2 million people were killed and 50 million injured on the roads around the world each year and was the leading cause of death among children 10–19 years of age.

The report also noted that the problem was most severe in developing countries and that simple prevention measures could halve the number of deaths. For reasons of clear data collection, only harm involving a road vehicle is included. A person tripping with fatal consequences or dying for some unrelated reason on a public road is not included in the relevant statistics.

== Statistics ==
International sign used widely in Europe denoting the start of special restrictions for a section of highway classed as a motorway

Russian Federal M8 highway sign

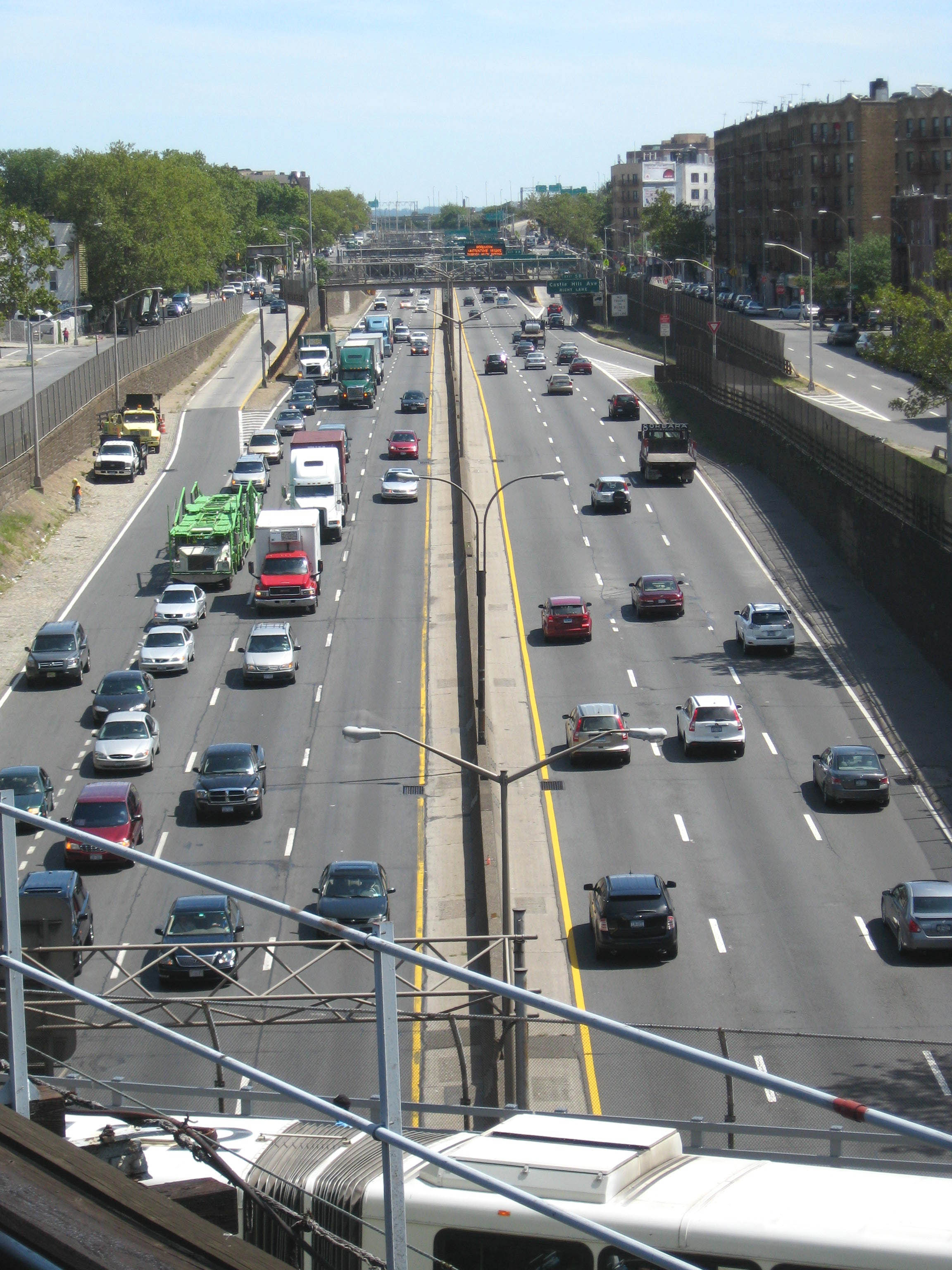
The Cross Bronx Expressway in New York, United States uses asphalt and concrete pavement, both of which are popular road surfaces on highways.

The United States has the world's largest network of highways, including both the Interstate Highway System and the United States Numbered Highway System. At least one of these networks is present in every state and they interconnect most major cities. It is also the world's most expensive mega-project, as the entirety of the Interstate Highway System was estimated to cost $27 billion in 1955 (equivalent to $253 billion in 2025).

China's highway network is the second most extensive in the world, with a total length of about 3,573,000 kilometres (2,220,000 mi). China's expressway network is the longest Expressway system in the world, and it is quickly expanding, stretching some 85,000 kilometres (53,000 mi) at the end of 2011. In 2008 alone, 6,433 kilometres (3,997 mi) expressways were added to the network.

Longest international highway
The Pan-American Highway, which connects many countries in the Americas, is nearly 25,000 kilometres (15,500 mi) long as of 2005. The Pan-American Highway is discontinuous because there is a significant gap in it in southeastern Panama, where the rainfall is immense and the terrain is entirely unsuitable for highway construction.
Longest national highway (point to point)
The Trans-Canada Highway has one main route, a northern route through the western provinces, and several branches in the central and eastern provinces. The main route is 7,821 kilometres (4,860 mi) long as of 2006 alone, and the entire system is over 10,700 kilometres (6,600 mi) long. The TCH runs east–west across southern Canada, the populated portion of the country, and it connects many of the major urban centres along its route crossing all provinces, and reaching nearly all of their capital cities. The TCH begins on the east coast in Newfoundland, traverses that island, and crosses to the mainland by ferry. It crosses the Maritime Provinces of eastern Canada with a branch route serving the province of Prince Edward Island via a ferry and bridge. After crossing the remainder of the country's mainland, the highway reaches Vancouver, British Columbia on the Pacific coast, where a ferry continues it to Vancouver Island and the provincial capital of Victoria. Numeric designation is the responsibility of the provinces, and there is no single route number across the country.
Longest national highway (circuit)
Australia's Highway 1 at over 14,500 kilometres (9,000 mi). It runs almost the entire way around the country's coastline. With the exception of the Federal Capital of Canberra, which is far inland, Highway 1 links all of Australia's capital cities, although Brisbane and Darwin are not directly connected, but rather are bypassed short distances away. Also, there is a ferry connection to the island state of Tasmania, and then a stretch of Highway 1 that links the major towns and cities of Tasmania, including Launceston and Hobart (this state's capital city).
Largest national highway system
The United States of America has approximately 6.43 million kilometres (4,000,000 mi) of highway within its borders as of 2008.
Busiest highway
Highway 401 in Ontario, Canada, has volumes surpassing an average of 500,000 vehicles per day in some sections of Toronto as of 2006.
Widest highway (maximum number of lanes)
The Katy Freeway (part of Interstate 10) in Houston, Texas, has a total of 26 lanes in some sections as of 2007. However, they are divided up into general use/ frontage roads/ HOV lanes, restricting the traverse traffic flow.
Widest highway (maximum number of through lanes)
Interstate 5 along a 3.2-kilometre-long (2 mi) section between Interstate 805 and California State Route 56 in San Diego, California, which was completed in April 2007, is 22 lanes wide.
Highest international highway
The Karakoram Highway, between Pakistan and China, is at an altitude of 4,693 metres (15,397 ft).
Highest national highway
National Highway 5, in India, connecting Amritsar in Punjab with Manali in Himachal Pradesh & Leh in Ladakh, reaches an approximate altitude of 4,900 metres (16,100 ft). The highest motorable road passes through Umling La at an altitude of 5,883 metres (19,301 ft) falls under the branch highway connecting National Highway 5 in India.

== Bus lane ==
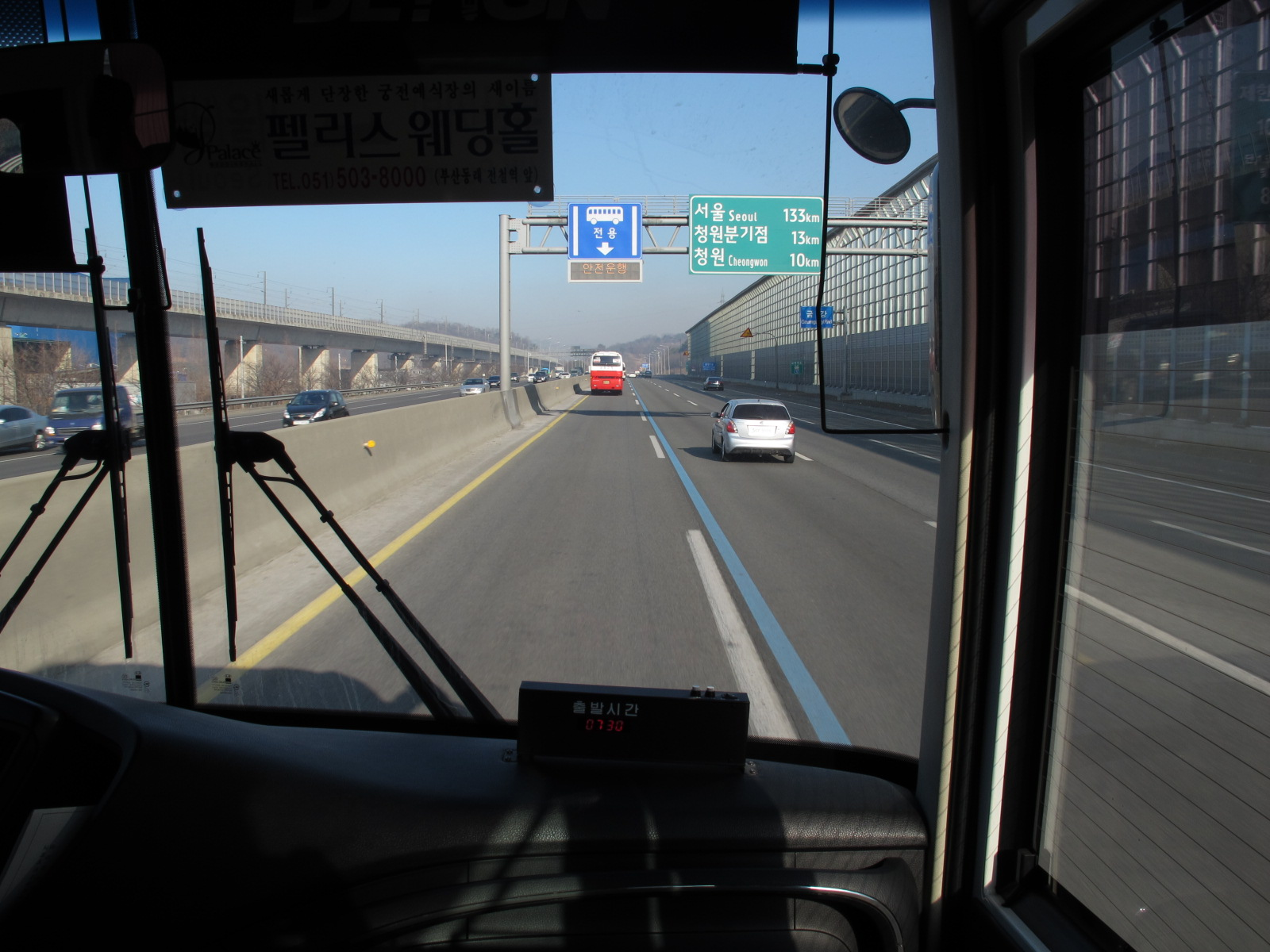
Highway bus lane on Gyeongbu Expressway in South Korea

Examples of highways with bus lanes
| Country | Highway | Bus lanes (km) | Section | Notes |
|---|---|---|---|---|
| Australia | M2 Hills Motorway | 21.4 | Abbott Road–Beecroft Road (Sydney) | |
| Australia | Eastern Freeway | 11 | Hoddle Street–Doncaster Park & Ride (Melbourne) | Under construction, to be finished 2027-2028 |
| Canada | Don Valley Parkway | 0.458 | Shoulder converted as bypass lane from Lawrence Avenue East to York Mills Road | |
| Canada | Ontario Highway 417 | 7 | Eagleson Road–Ontario Highway 417 (Ottawa) | |
| Canada | Ontario Highway 403 | 6 | Mavis Road–Winston Churchill Boulevard (Mississauga) | |
| Hong Kong | Tuen Mun Road | 19.4 | | |
| India | National Highway (India) | 19 | 30 lanes Road, (Mumbai) | |
| Netherlands | A1 motorway (Netherlands) | 119 | End of A6-Vechtbrug (Muiden) | |
| South Korea | Gyeongbu Expressway | 137.4 | Hannam IC (Seoul) ~ Sintanjin IC (Daejeon) | |
| United States | El Monte Busway | 19 | Shared use Busway between Interstate 10 between Los Angeles Union Station and El Monte station (Los Angeles) | |

=== South Korea ===
In South Korea, in February 1995 a bus lane (essentially an HOV-9) was established between the northern terminus and Sintanjin for important holidays and on 1 July 2008 bus lane enforcement between Seoul and Osan (Sintanjin on weekends) became daily between 6 a.m. and 10 p.m. On 1 October this was adjusted to 7 a.m. to 9 p.m. weekdays, and 9 a.m. to 9 p.m. weekends.

- On the dotted line, vehicles except buses can make a right turn and temporarily pass for joining. However, when the lanes are not open, it is treated as white dotted lines.
- On the double-dotted line, bus-only is implemented even during hours other than commuting. Vehicles except for buses can temporarily pass for right turns and joining. However, when the dedicated vehicle is not operating hours, it is treated as a white dotted line.
- On the solid line, vehicles except buses are prohibited from driving, but it is operated flexibly according to the time and day of the week. When it is not operating hours for exclusive vehicles, it is treated as a white solid line.
- On the double line, buses will be operated even during hours other than commuting hours. However, if the cars are not operated, it will be treated as solid white lines.

=== Hong Kong ===
In Hong Kong, some highways are set up with bus lanes to solve the traffic congestion.

| District | Highway | Section |
|---|---|---|
| Tuen Mun | Tuen Mun Road | So Kwun Wat to Sham Tseng |
| Sha Tin | Lion Rock Tunnel | The entry of the tunnel |

=== Philippines ===
Traffic congestion was a principal problem in major roads and highways in the Philippines, especially in Metro Manila and other major cities. The government decided to set up some bus lanes in Metro Manila like in the Epifanio delos Santos Avenue.

== Gallery ==
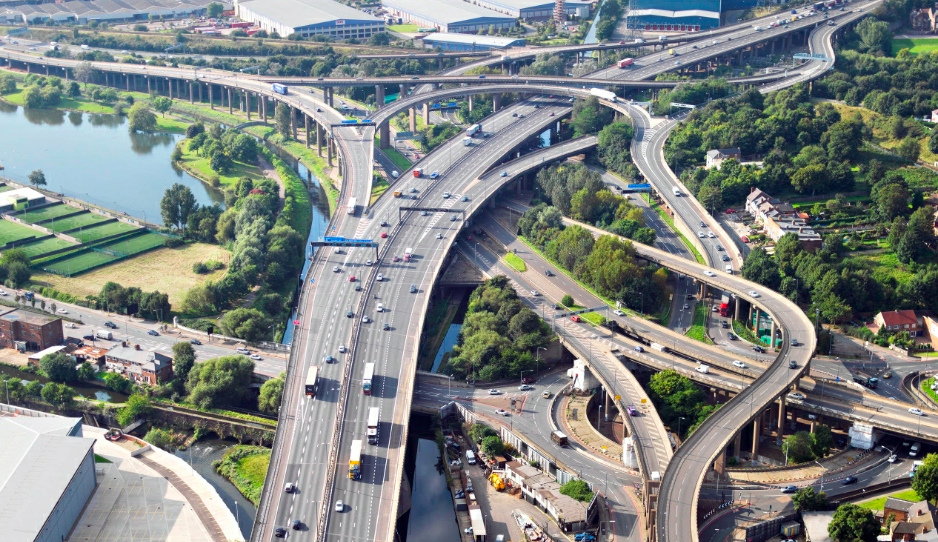
Gravelly Hill Interchange in Birmingham, England

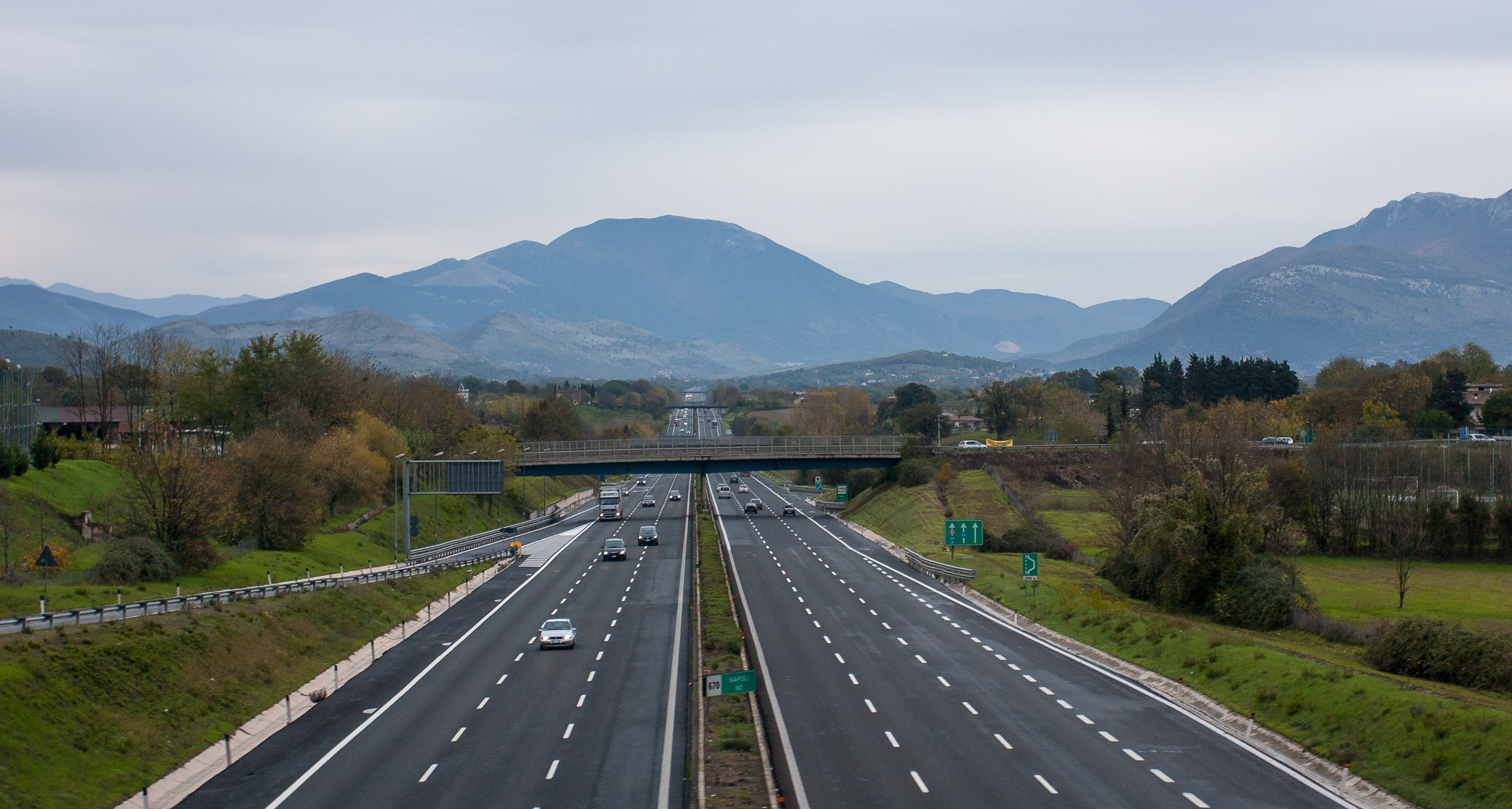
Autostrada A1 runs through Italy linking some of the largest cities of the country: Milan, Bologna, Florence, Rome and Naples

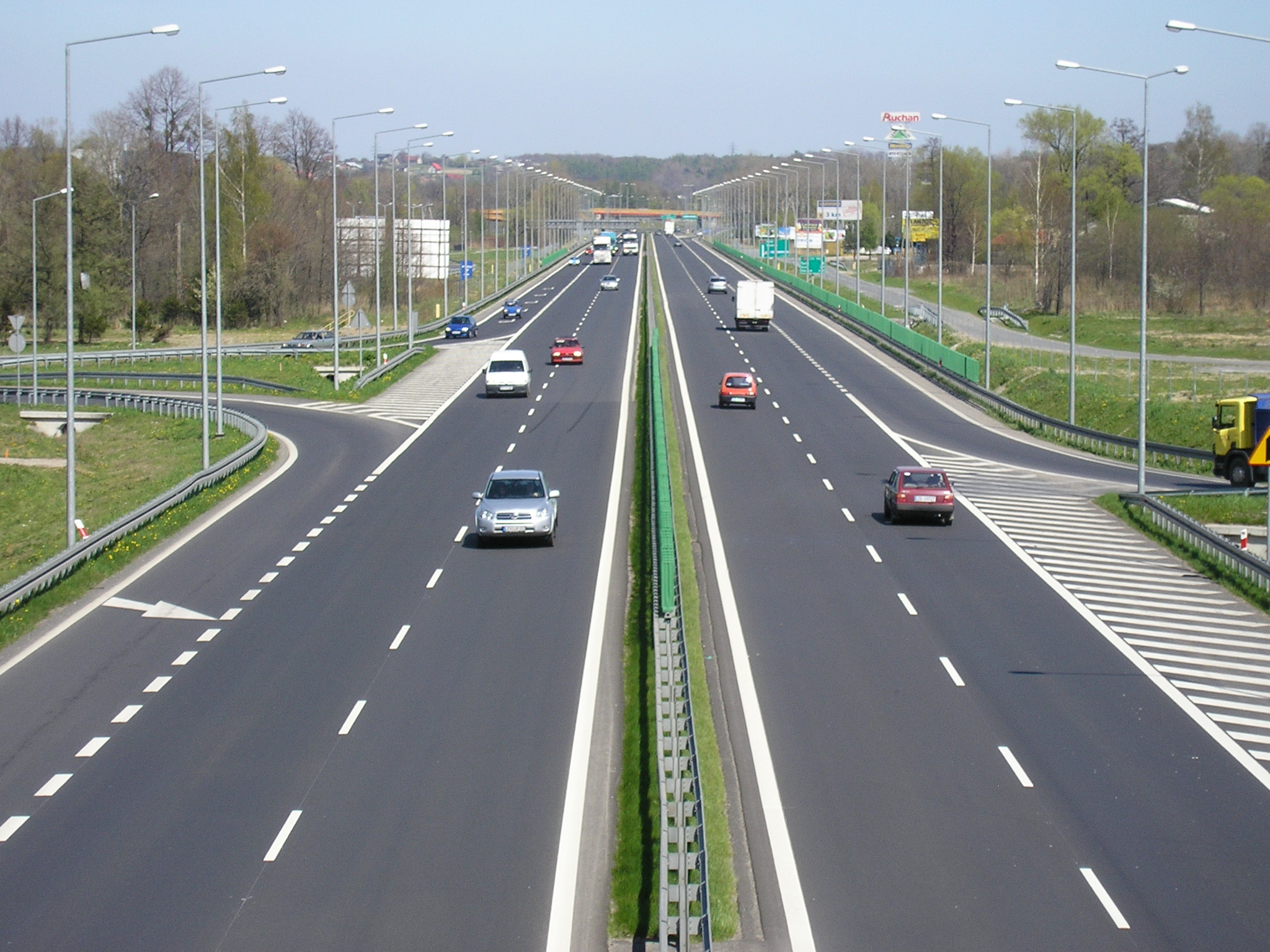
A Polish expressway in Bielsko-Biała

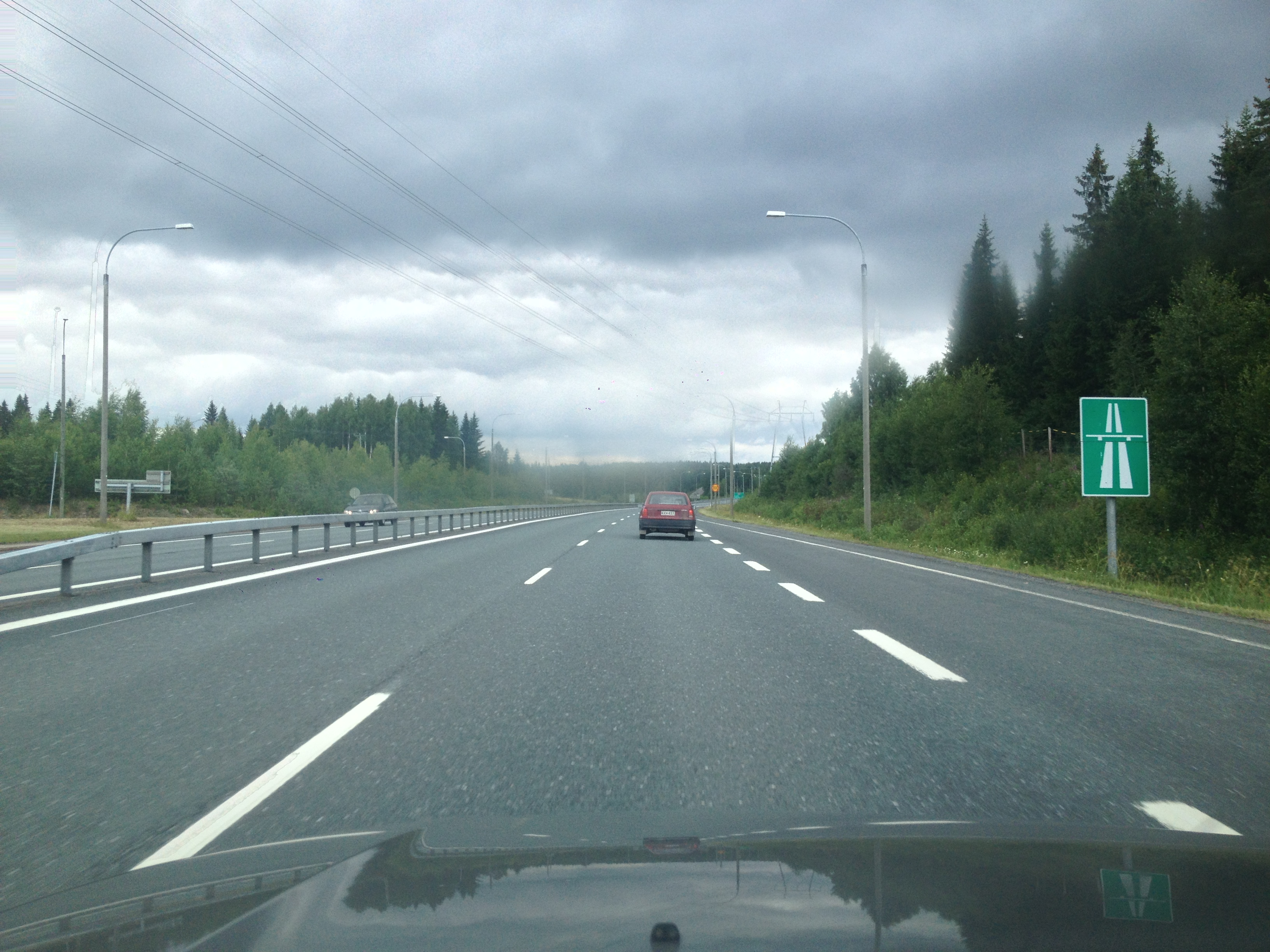
National road 5 in Kuopio, Finland

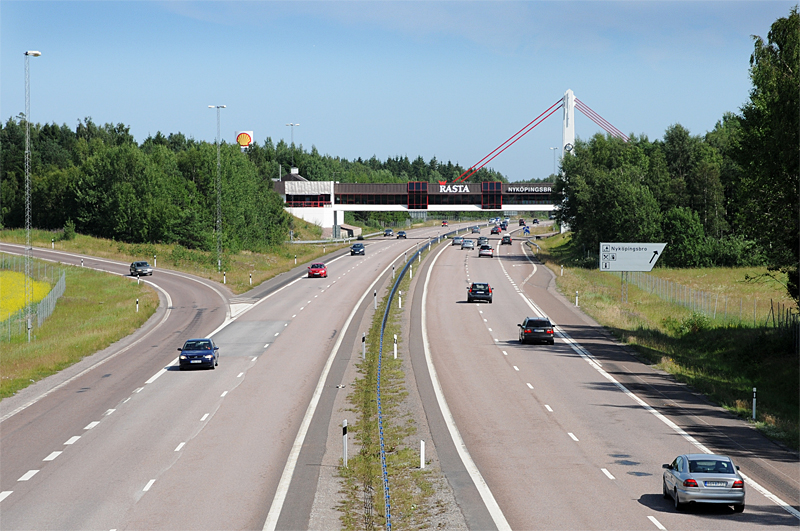
E4 motorway with rest area outside Nyköping, Sweden

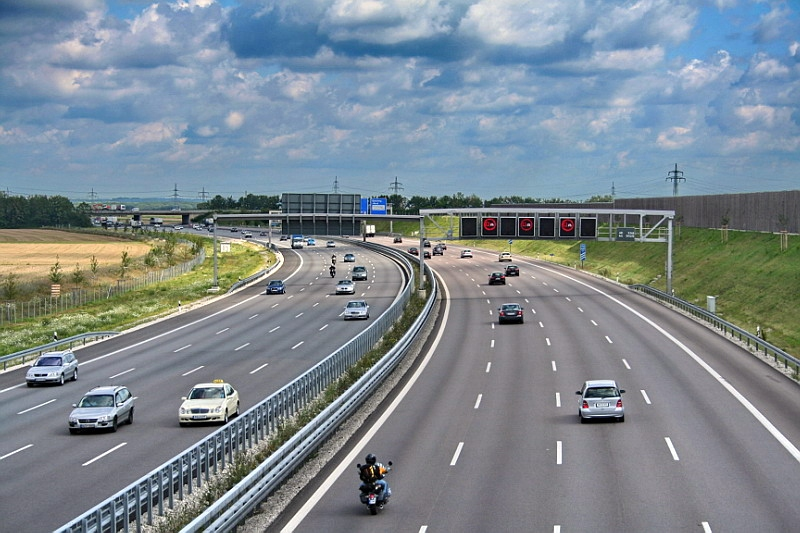
Multi-lane Autobahn 9 in Munich, Germany

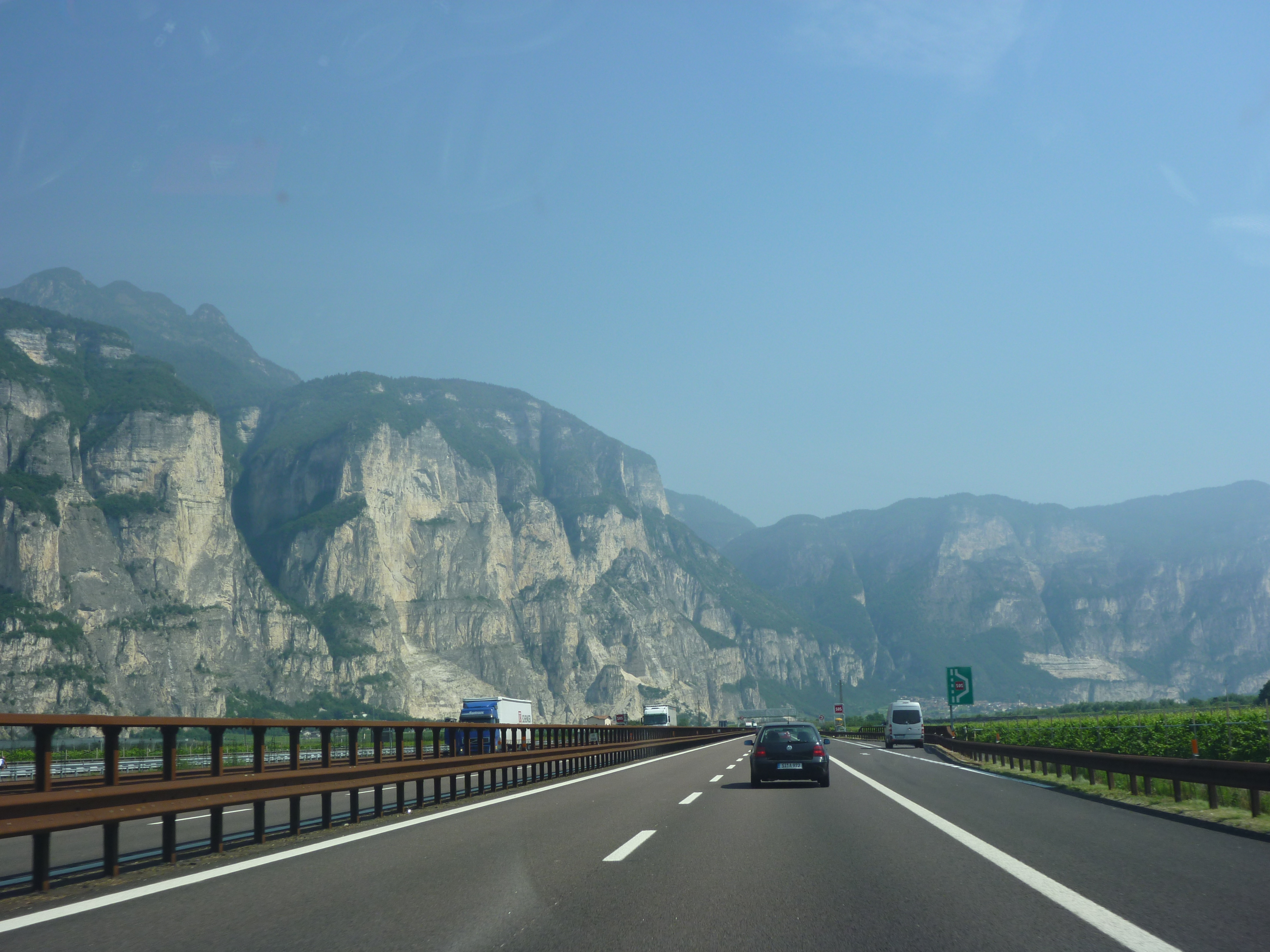
Autostrada A22 runs through Po Valley and Alps linking Modena, Italy, to Brenner Pass, a mountain pass which forms the border between Italy and Austria

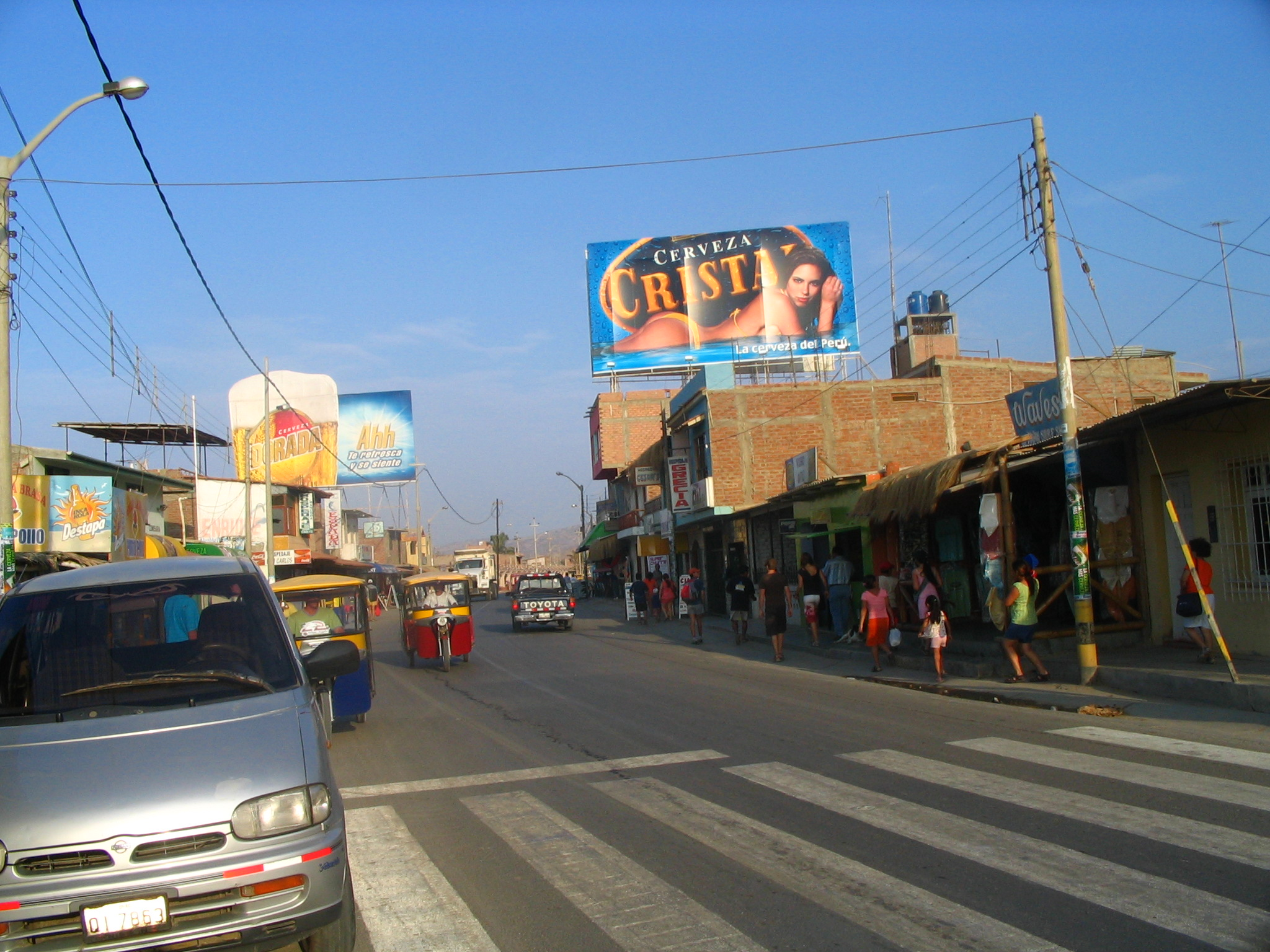
The Pan-American Highway where it serves as the main street in Máncora, Peru

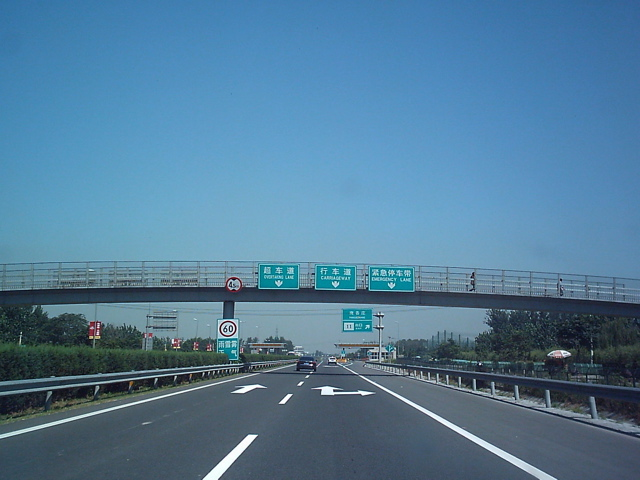
A typical expressway in China

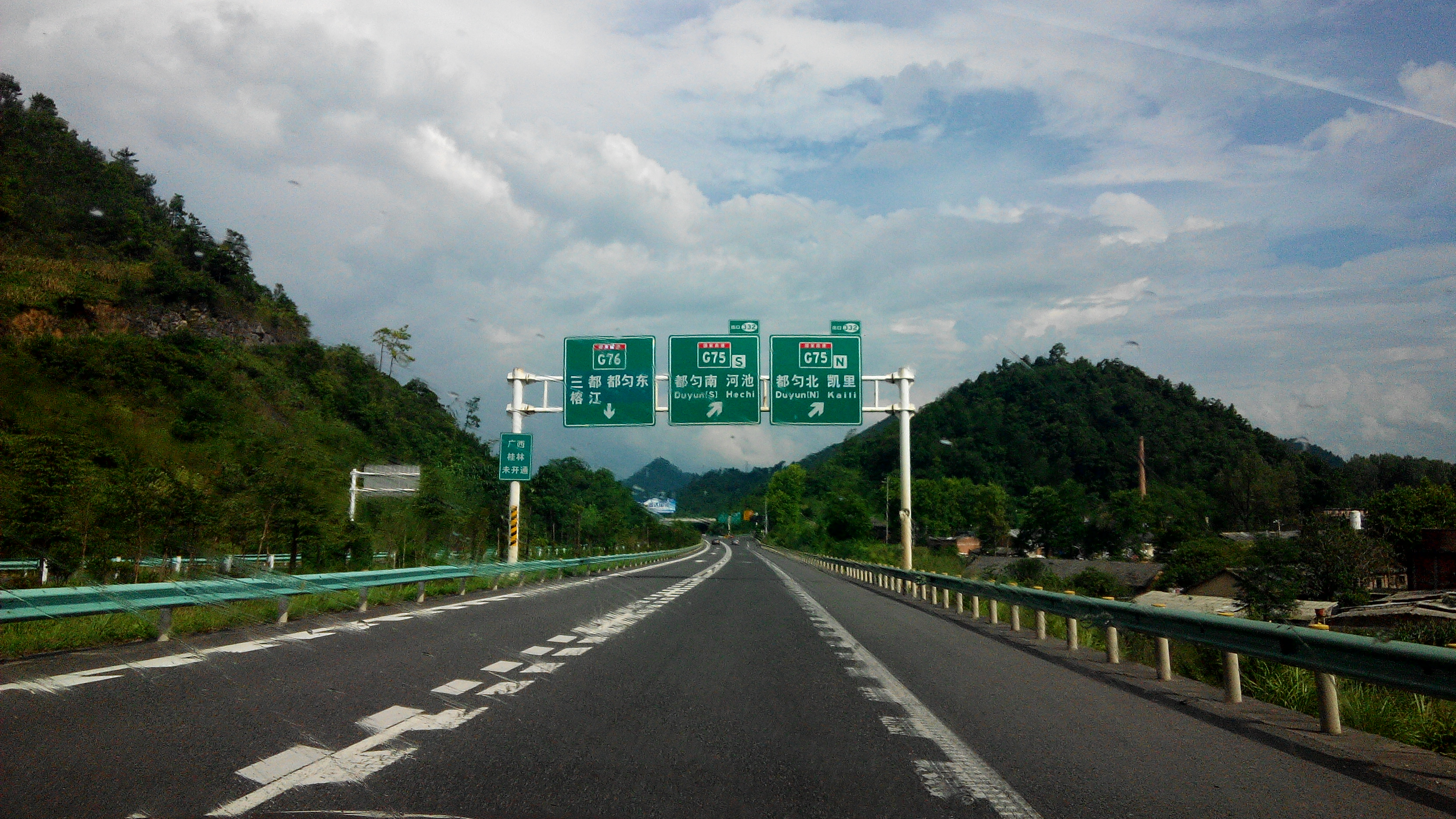
An expressway exit in Guizhou, China

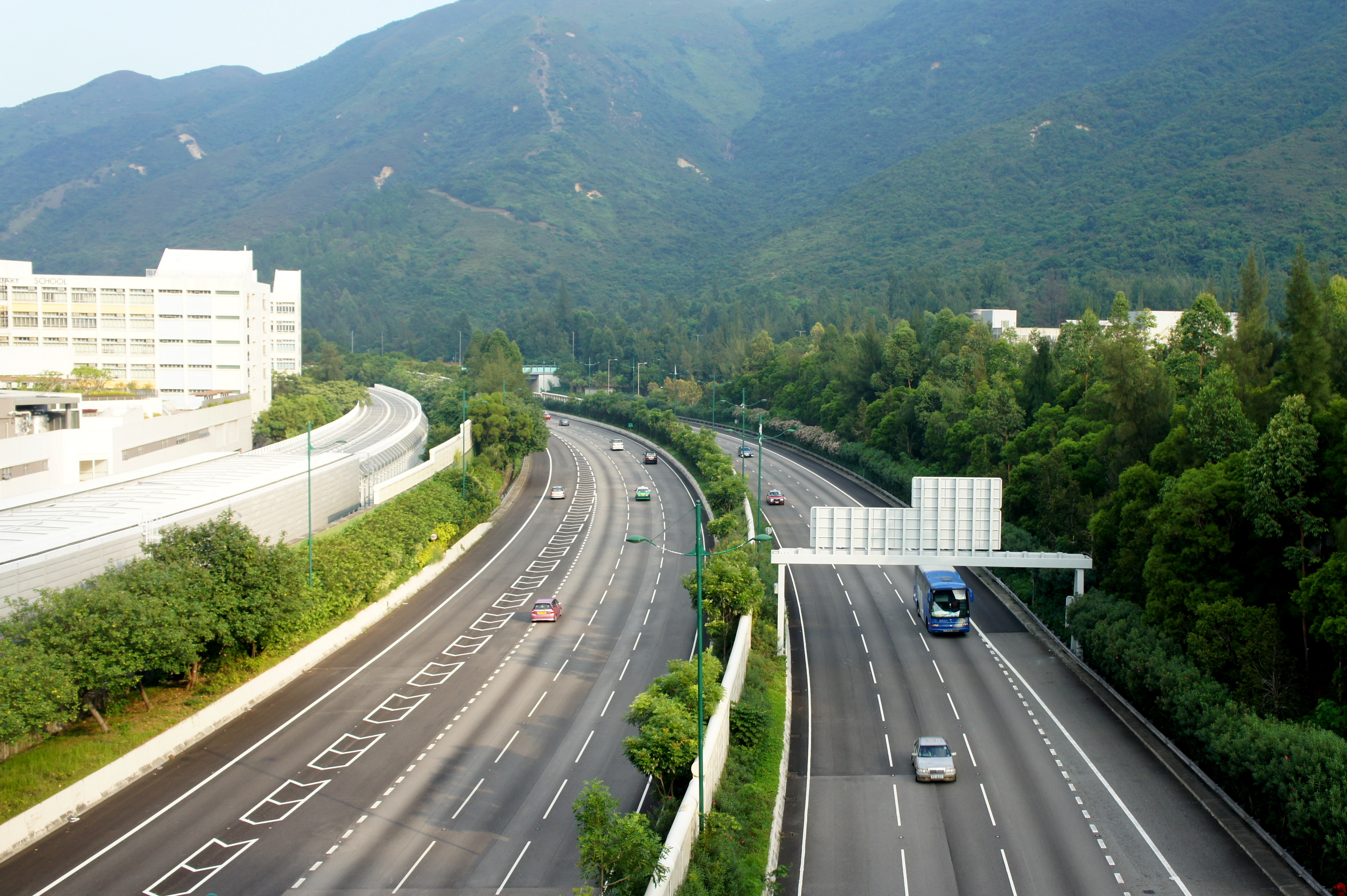
North Lantau Highway in Hong Kong

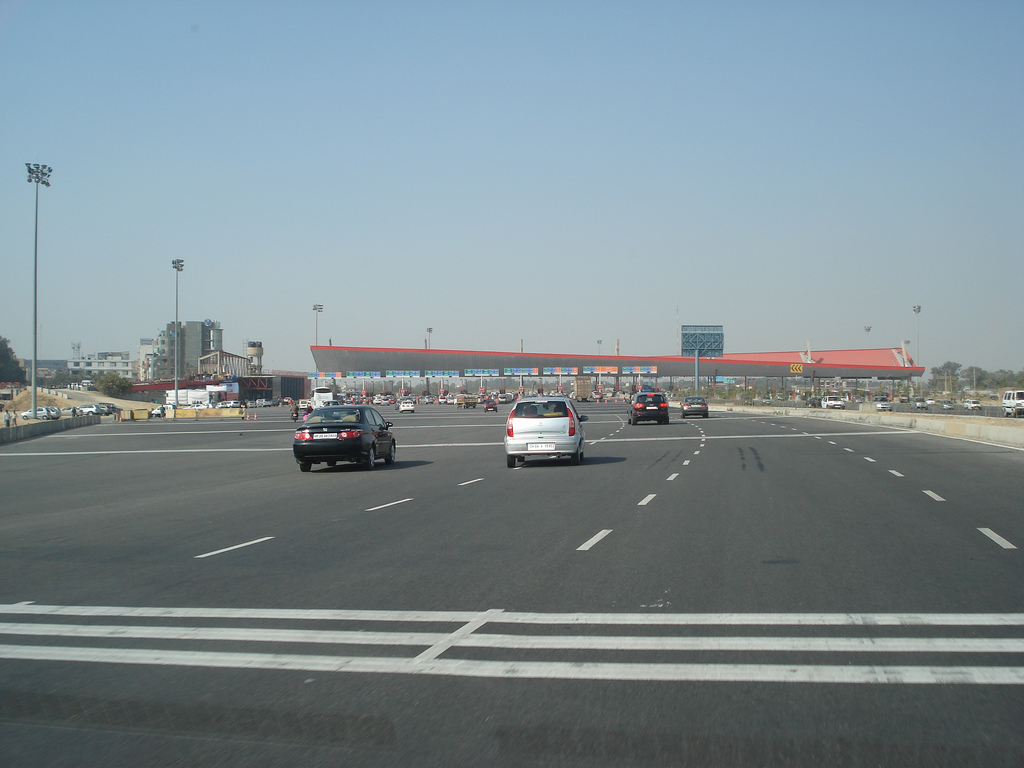
32-lane toll plaza at Delhi-Gurgaon Expressway in Gurgaon, India

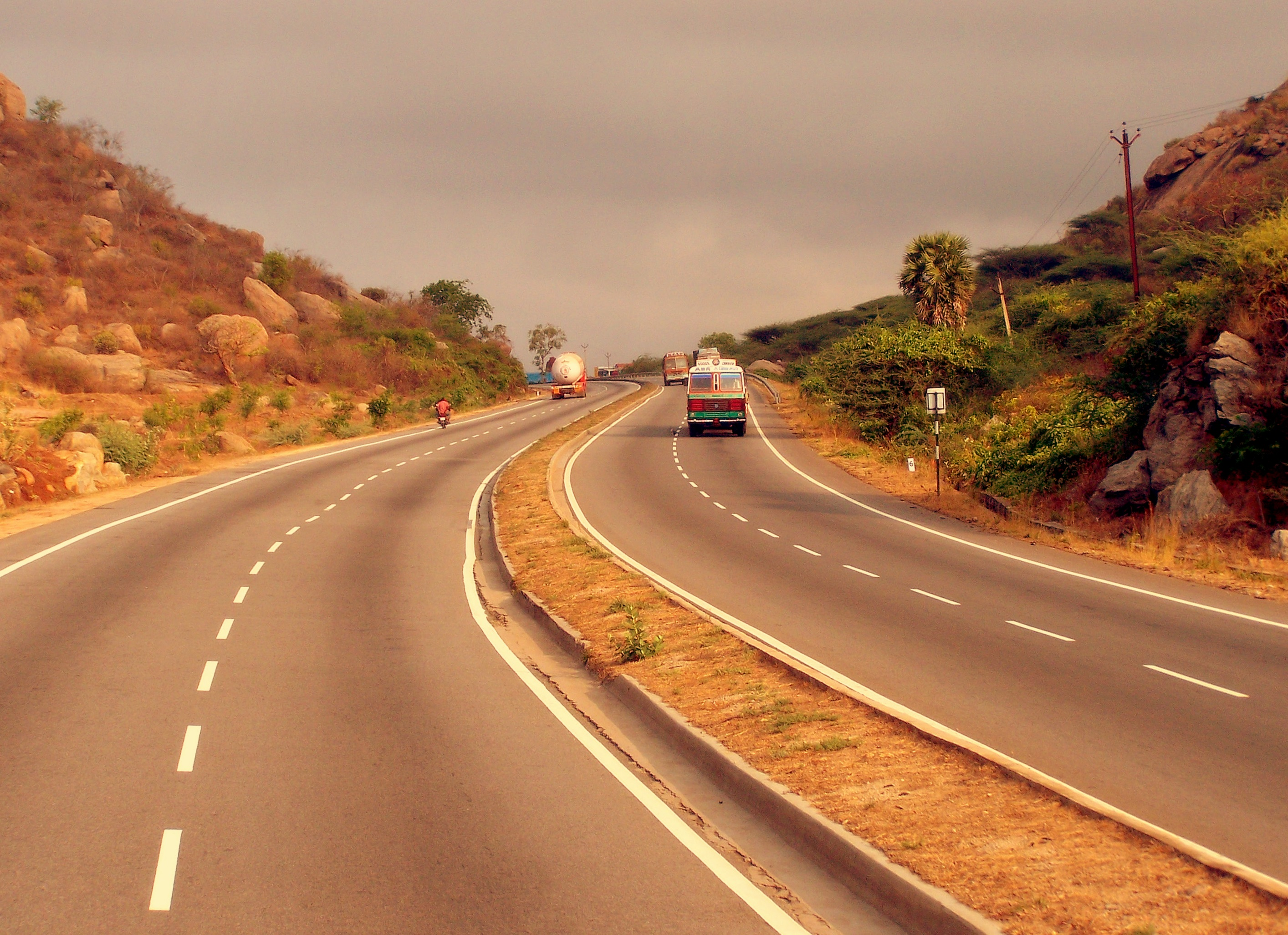
Chennai-Bangalore Highway in India

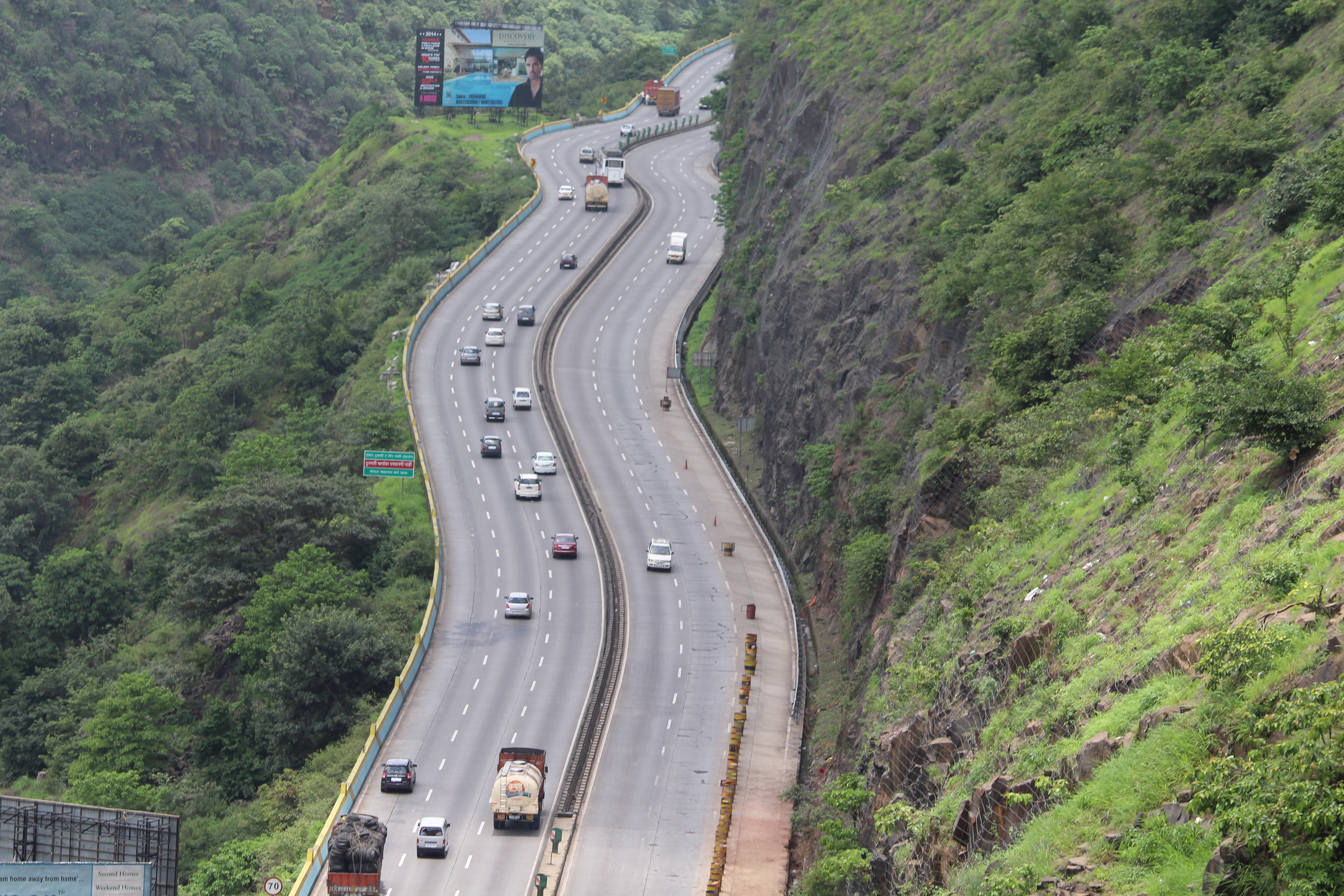
Mumbai Pune Expressway, India

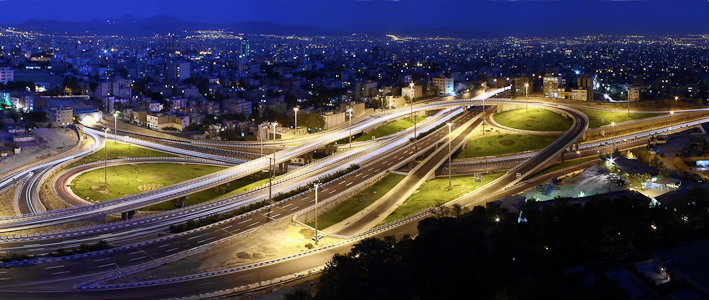
A highway interchange in Tehran, Iran

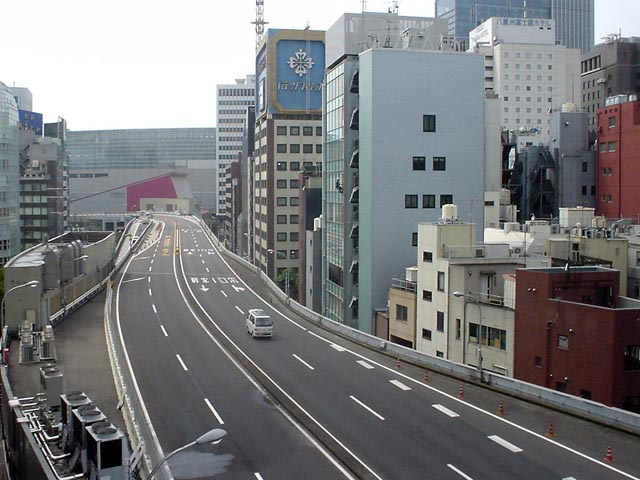
The Metropolitan Expressway in Tokyo, Japan

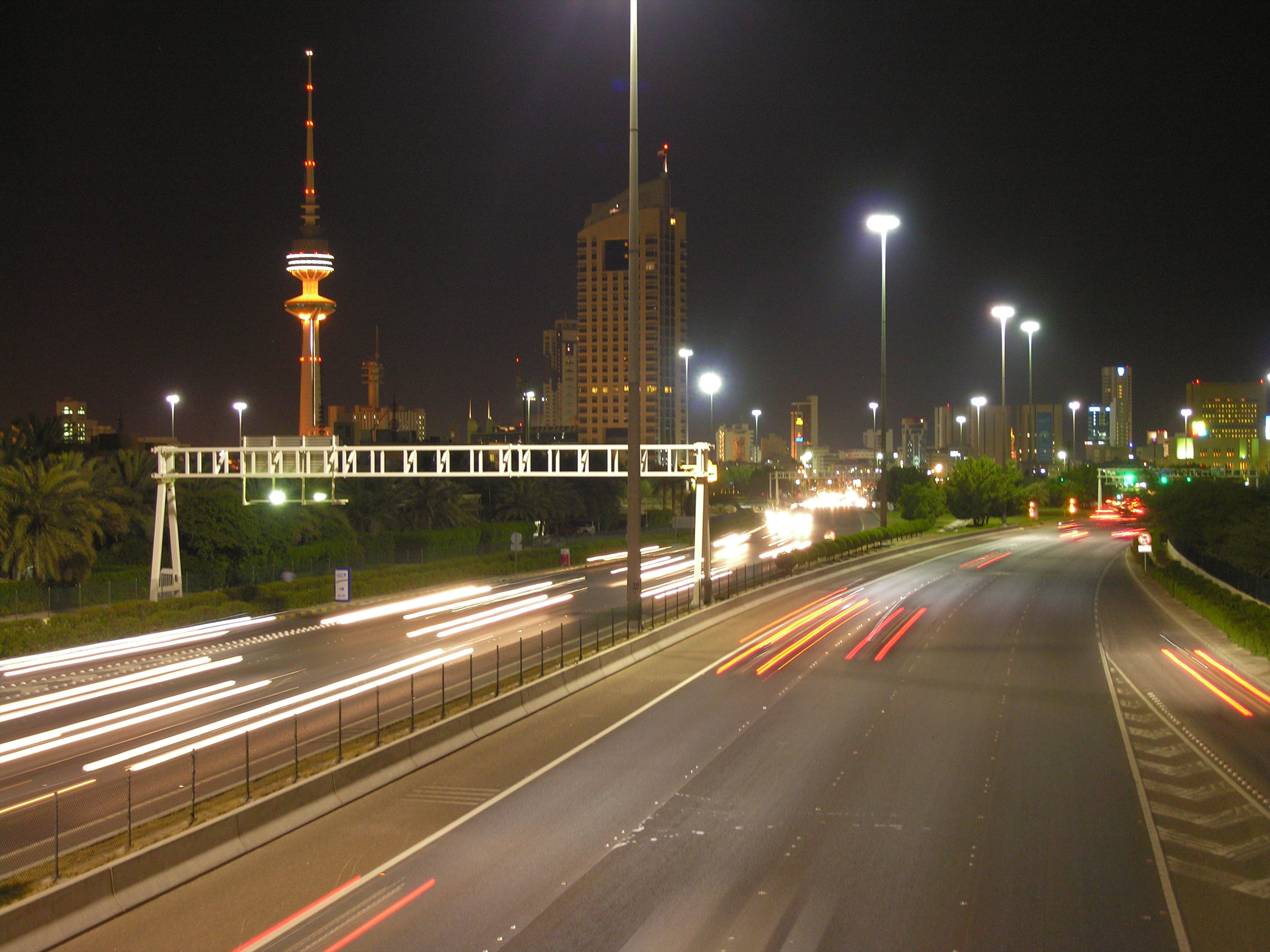
A highway in Kuwait City, Kuwait

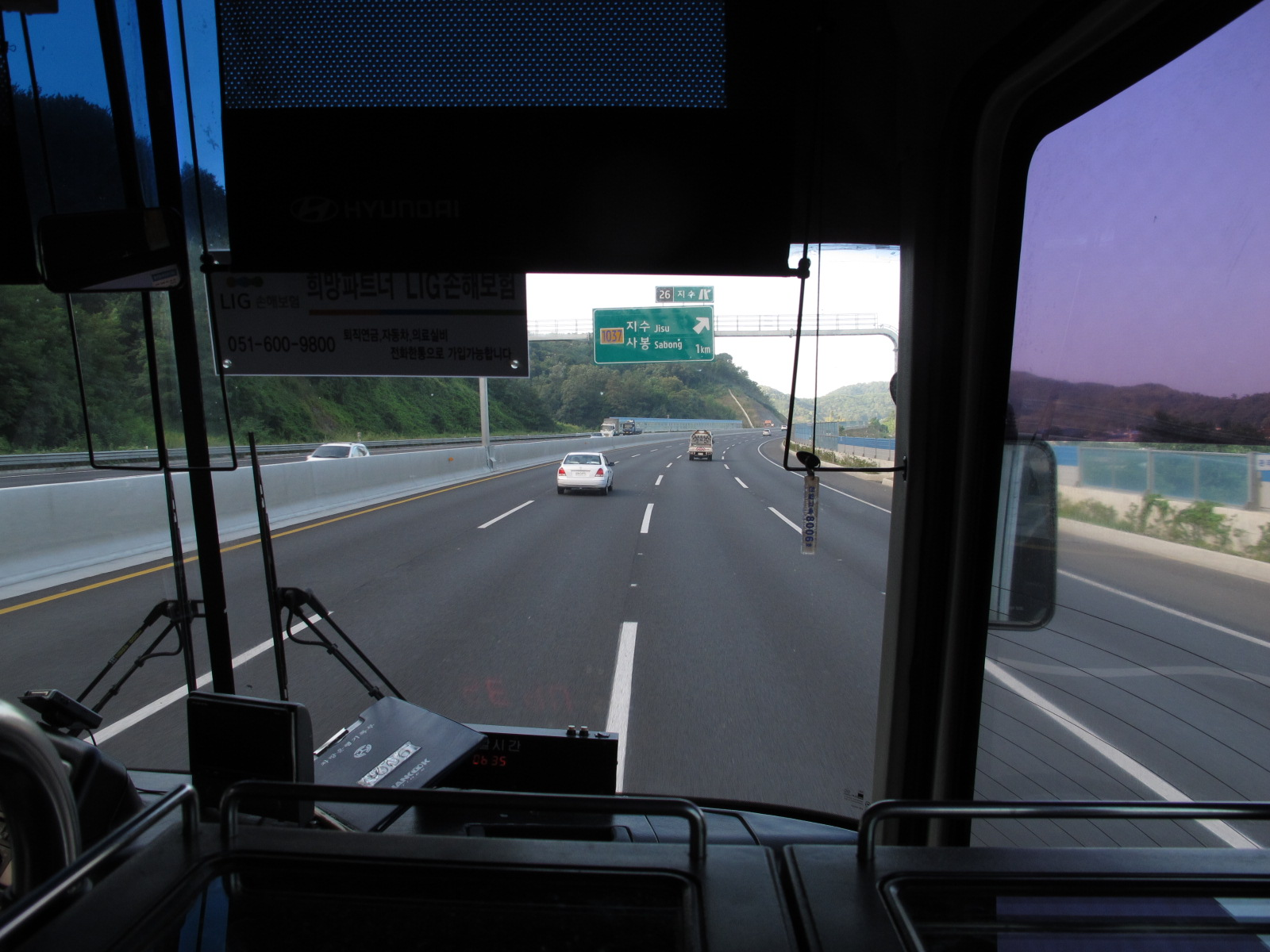
Namhae Expressway in Jinju, South Korea

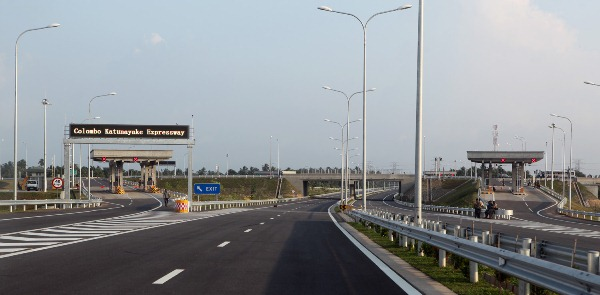
Ja-Ela Interchange in the Airport Expressway(E03) in Ja-Ela, Sri Lanka

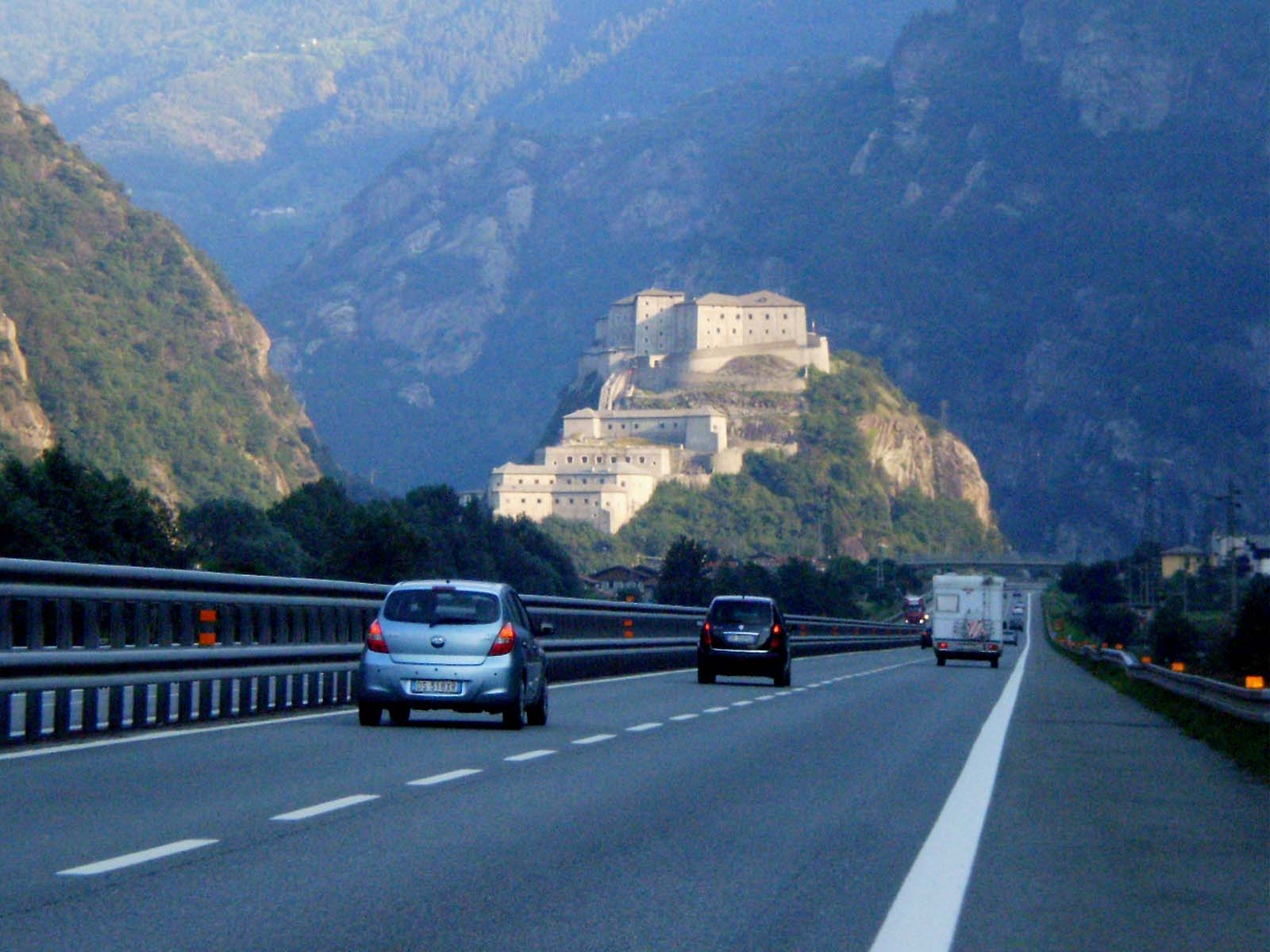
Autostrada A5 connects Turin and the Aosta Valley (Italy) to France through the Mont Blanc Tunnel

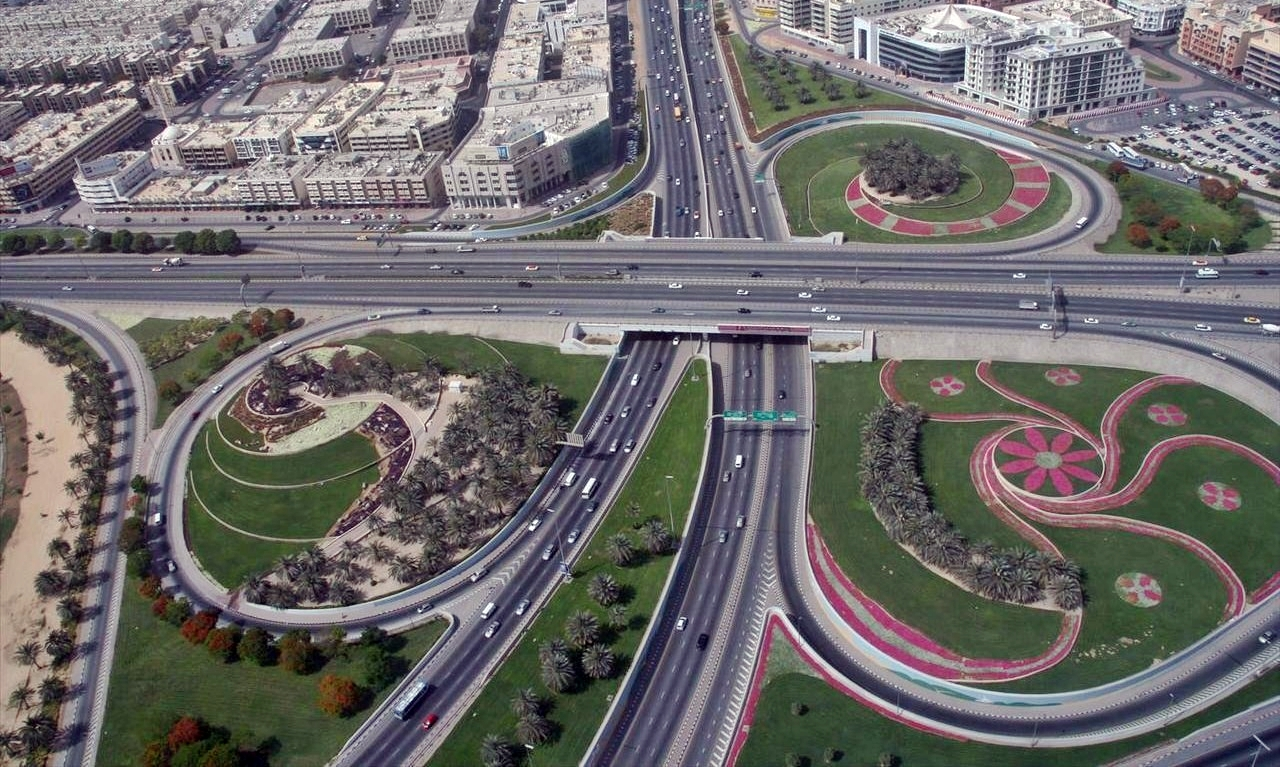
3/4 highway interchange in Dubai, United Arab Emirates

== Highways by country ==
The following is a list of highways by country in alphabetical order.

National highways of India

Autostrade (highways) of Italy

- Algeria East–West Highway
- Autobahns of Austria
- Autoput and Autocesta (Bosnia and Herzegovina)
- Rodovia (Brazil)
- Avtomagistrala (Bulgaria, Ukraine)
- Highways in Canada
- Expressway (China)
- Autocesta (Croatia)
- Dálnice (Czech Republic)
- Autostrada (Egypt, Poland, Romania)
- Autoroute (France)
- Autobahns of Germany
- Aftokinitodromos (Greece)
- Autópálya (Hungary)
- National Highways and Expressways (India)
- Motorway (Ireland)
- List of highways in Israel
- Autostrade of Italy (Italy)
- Kōsokudōro (Japan)
- Lebuhraya (Malaysia)
- Autopista de Carretera Federal (Mexico)
- Autoroute (Morocco)
- Avtopat (North Macedonia)
- Motorvei (Norway)
- Motorways and National Highways of Pakistan
- Philippine highway network
- Autoestrada (Portugal)
- Russian federal highways (Russia)
- Autoput (Serbia)
- Avtocesta (Slovenia)
- Expressways in South Korea
- Autopista (Spain)
- Motorväg (Sweden)
- Autobahns of Switzerland
- Freeways in Taiwan
- Thai highway network (Thailand)
- State Highways (Ukraine) (Ukraine)
- Highways in the United Kingdom
- Autofamba (Zimbabwe)

== See also ==
- Bypass route
- Controlled-access highway
- Divided highway (dual carriageway)
- Freeway
- Highway systems by country
- Highwayman
- Infrastructure
- Limited-access road
- List of roads and highways
- Motorway
- Parkway
- Passing lane
- Ring road
- Road
- Road junction
- Road safety
- Road transport
- Roadway air dispersion modeling
- Roadway noise
- Toll road
- Undivided highway (single carriageway)
