= Marakabei =

- Location in Lesotho
- Coordinates: 29°32′S 28°09′E
- Country: Lesotho
- District: Thaba-Tseka District

Marakabei is a town in central Lesotho. It is located southeast of the capital Maseru, close to the banks of the Senqunyane River, between the God Help Me Pass and Mokhoabong Pass.
