= A road =

A roads may be

- motorways or freeways, usually where the local word for motorway begins with A (for example, Autobahn in German; autostrada in Italian).
- main roads or highways, in a system where roads are graded A, B and sometimes lower categories
- roads in a particular area or zone designated A

== List of A roads ==
This is a list of road numbering systems which include A roads.

Country	Area	Type of road	See
Australia		Main roads	Highways in Australia
Austria		Motorways	Autobahns of Austria
Belgium		Motorways	List of motorways in Belgium
Botswana		Main roads	Roads in Botswana
Bulgaria		Motorways	Motorways in Bulgaria
Canada	Quebec	Freeways	Autoroutes of Quebec
Croatia		Motorways	Motorways in Croatia
Cyprus		Motorways	Motorways and roads in Cyprus
France		Motorways	Autoroutes of France
Germany		Motorways	German Autobahnen
Greece		Motorways	Motorways in Greece
Isle of Man		Main roads	A roads on the Isle of Man
Italy		Motorways	Autostrade of Italy
Jamaica		Main roads	Roads in Jamaica
Jersey		Main roads	Roads in Jersey
Kenya		Main roads	Roads in Kenya
Latvia		Main roads	A roads in Latvia
Lesotho		Main roads	A3 highway (Lesotho)
Lithuania		Main roads	A roads in Lithuania
Malaysia	Perak	State roads	Malaysian State Roads system
Morocco		Motorways	Moroccan expressways
Namibia		Motorways	Roads in Namibia
Netherlands		Motorways	List of motorways in the Netherlands
Poland		Motorways	Motorways in Poland
Portugal		Motorways	Auto-estrada
Romania		Motorways	Motorways in Romania
Slovenia		Motorways	Motorways in Slovenia
Spain		Motorways	List of autopistas and autovias in Spain
Sri Lanka		Main roads	A roads in Sri Lanka
Switzerland		Motorways	Autobahns of Switzerland
Tunisia		Motorways	Motorways in Tunisia
United Kingdom	Great Britain	Main roads	A roads in Great Britain
United Kingdom	Northern Ireland	Main roads	List of A roads in Northern Ireland
United States	Alaska	Interstate highways	Interstate Highways in Alaska
United States	Northeast California	County routes	California county routes in zone A
United States	Georgia and North Carolina	Mixed	Corridor A
United States	Michigan between I-96 and US 127	County highways	List of County-Designated Highways in Michigan
Zimbabwe		Primary routes	Transport in Zimbabwe

== See also ==
- List of roads and highways
