= Molimo-Nthuse =

Town in western Lesotho

- Village
- Map of Lesotho
- Coordinates: -29.4237311,27.8954646,15z
- Demonym: Molimo-Nthusian

Molimo-Nthuse is a town in western Lesotho. It stands close to the western approach to the God Help Me Pass, on the banks of the Makhaleng River.
