= Makhaleng River =

Coordinates: 30.3253°S 27.3764°E

Makhaleng
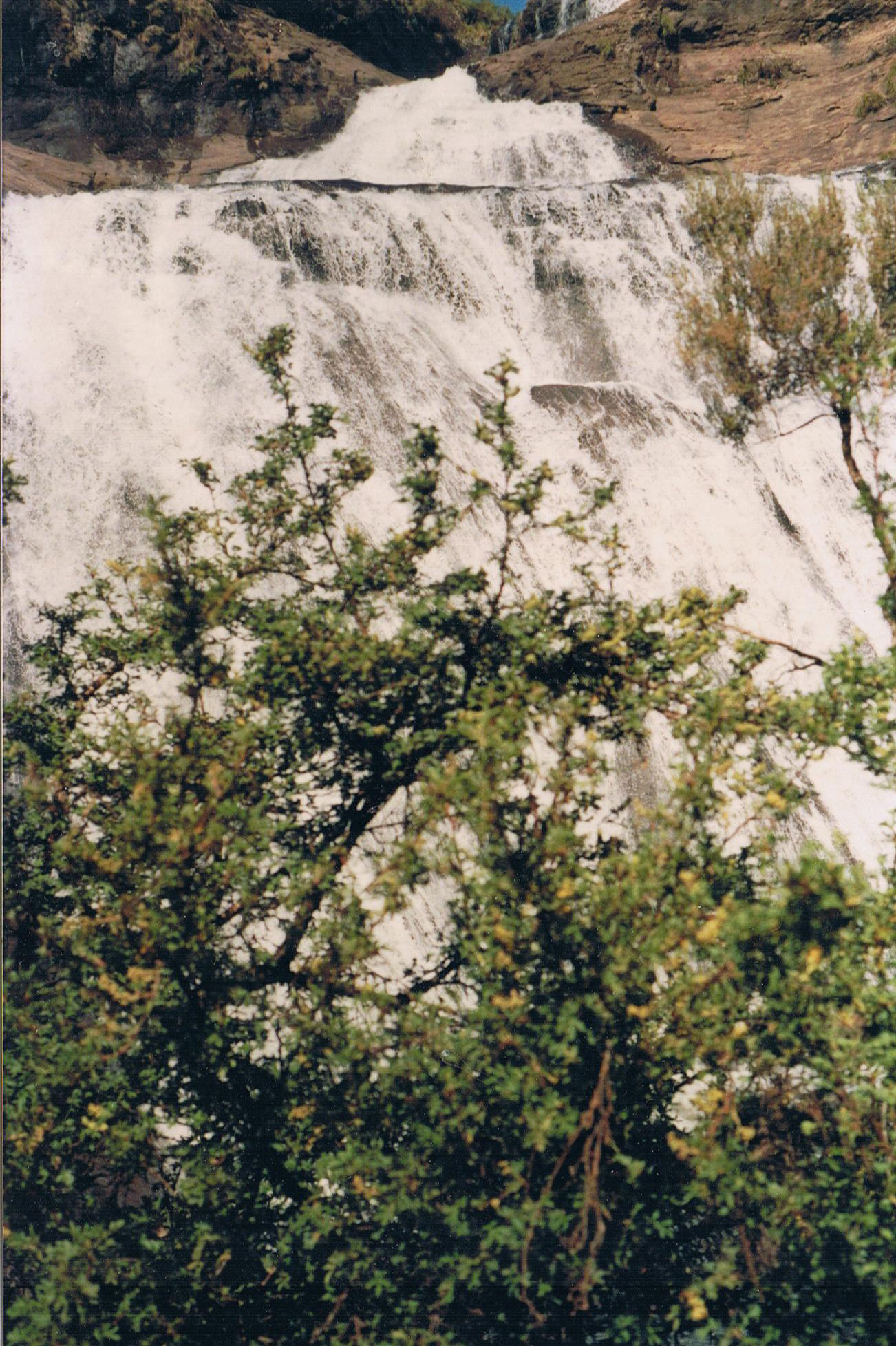
- The Qoaling falls in the Makhaleng River

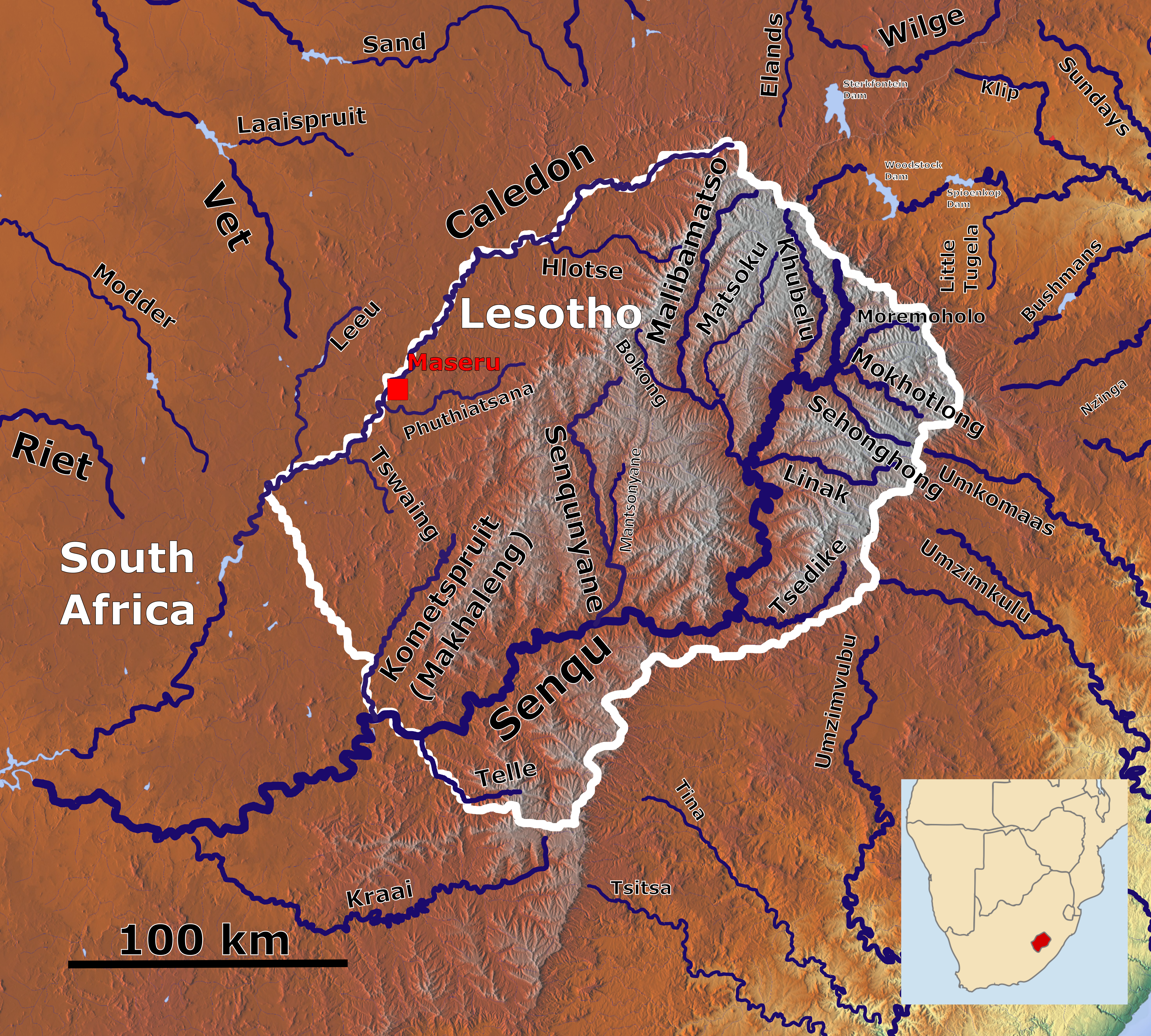
- The Makhaleng in the state territory of Lesotho (lower left center)

Location
- Country: Lesotho, South Africa

Physical characteristics
- Source
  - location: Maloti Mountains
  - elevation: 2,230 m (7,320 ft)
- Mouth
  - location: Orange River
  - elevation: 1,390 m (4,560 ft)
- Length: 190 km (120 mi)
- Basin size: 8,508 km^{2} (3,285 sq mi)
- Discharge
  - average: 1.93 m^{3}/s (68 cu ft/s)

The Makhaleng River is a river of western Lesotho. It rises in the Maloti Mountains, flows generally in a southwesterly direction to join the Orange River at the border with Free State in South Africa.

== Course ==
The river originates northwest of the 2,886 m (9,469 ft) high Machache in the Maluti Mountains. It flows southwest across the Lesotho Highlands past the towns and villages of Molimo-Nthuse, Makhaleng, Ramabanta and Qaba, flowing into the Orange River at the international border by the Free State near the Makhaleng Bridge. At an elevation of 1,400 metres (4,593 ft), the mouth of the Makhaleng is the lowest point in Lesotho, and the highest lowest point of any country.

The valley of the river forms part of the approach to several mountain passes, notably the God Help Me Pass and the Gates of Paradise Pass. The Qiloane Falls are a tourist attraction located in the upper course of the river. They are about 30 m (100 ft) high but are more known for their width, as the water flows across the rocks in a "bridal veil".

In Lesotho this river in its upper parts does not have a flood plain. The flow is swift and the river rises rapidly after heavy rainfall in the mountains and during the spring thaw. The catchment area is about 300,000 hectares (740,000 acres) and the average flow is about 15 cubic metres (530 cu ft) per second. There are no large reservoirs on the river, but there are a number of small and medium-sized ones constructed for soil conservation and for water collection purposes. These are liable to silt up and a few have washed away.

== Tributaries ==
The Makhaleng has three main tributaries the Makhalaneng, the Qhoqhoane and the Khibiting. All of them flow into it from the right bank as they drain the water off the Maluti Mountains.
