= Federal Aid Highway Act of 1921 =

Federal act in the United States regarding highway construction

- Long title: An act to amend the Act entitled "An Act to provide that the United States shall aid the States in the construction of rural post roads, and for other purposes," approved July 11, 1916, as amended and supplemented, and for other purposes
- Nicknames: Phipps Act
- Enacted by: the 67th United States Congress

Citations
- Public law: Pub. L. 67–87
- Statutes at Large: 42 Stat. 212

Legislative history
- Signed into law by President Warren G. Harding on November 9, 1921

The Federal Aid Highway Act of 1921, also called the Phipps Act (Pub. L. 67–87, 42 Stat. 212), sponsored by Sen. Lawrence C. Phipps (R) of Colorado, defined the Federal Aid Road program to develop an immense national highway system. The plan was crafted by the head of the National Highway Commission, Thomas Harris MacDonald and was the first coherent plan for the nation's future roads. President Warren Harding signed the act into law on November 9, 1921.

== History ==
L. I. Hewes opened the Western Headquarters Office of the Bureau of Public Roads to administer federal-aid highway and direct federal highway construction programs in 11 western states, including Alaska and Hawaii. It provided federal 50–50 matching funds for state highway building up to 7 percent of roads statewide. By the end of 1921, more than $75 million in aid had been given to the states.

In 1922, the Bureau of Public Roads commissioned Gen. John J. Pershing to draw up the Pershing Map for construction purposes and to give the government a clear understanding of which roads in the U.S. were the most important in the event of war. The "Pershing Map" was the first official topographic road map of the United States. From it, the Appalachian Trail from Maine to Georgia was begun in 1922. By 1923, the roads authorized by the act had been completed.
