= Nazareth, Lesotho =

Town

Coordinates: 29.40°S 27.80°E

Nazareth is a town in western Lesotho. It is located to the east of the capital, Maseru, and west of the God Help Me Pass. Ha Baroana, an important archaeological site, is located just to the north of Nazareth.

== In popular culture ==
Nazareth was the main filming location of Lemohang Jeremiah Mosese's 2019 feature film This Is Not a Burial, It's a Resurrection. The movie details the reaction of the people living in Nazareth to the government's decision to build a dam in the name of progress and flood the town.
