= Mantsonyane =

Mantšonyane
- Location in Lesotho
- Coordinates: 29°34′S 28°16′E
- Country: Lesotho
- District: Thaba-Tseka District
- Constituency: Mantšonyane
- Elevation: 7,333 ft (2,235 m)

Mantšonyane is a town in central Lesotho. It is located southeast of the capital Maseru, close to the western approach to the Mokhoabong Pass, on a high mountain plateau between the towns of Marakabei and Thaba-Tseka, in the Thaba-Tseka District.

Located on the central mountain plateau of Lesotho, Mantšonyane is difficult to reach by ground transport. In the official biography of Archbishop Desmond Tutu, who was the Bishop of Lesotho in the late 1970s, the difficulty of travel around the mountainous central region of Lesotho is illustrated by a detailed account of the Bishop's journey from his official residence in Maseru to St James's Hospital in Mantšonyane.

== St James' Hospital and regional health care ==
In 1963 the Anglican Church opened, through its USPG mission agency, a mission hospital in Mantšonyane. St James' Hospital has grown significantly and is now a major feature of the community. In addition to providing full hospital facilities (with 60 beds) to local residents, the hospital also operates a number of satellite health care facilities in the surrounding region, including six health centres, one health clinic, and two rural village health posts.

For many years resident doctors and matrons were provided through the Anglican Diocese of Lesotho and through USPG. The hospital buildings were largely constructed and staffed through USPG fundraising. Today USPG remains a mission partner, although the mission agency contributes chiefly through its hospital based "USPG connect project" for mothers and babies. Lesotho has a very high infant mortality rate. The hospital was connected to electricity for the first time in 1986, and to the landline telephone network in 2000.

== Community facilities ==
The Anglican Diocese of Lesotho constructed and runs the parish church of St James and also St James' primary school. Both are located adjacent to St James' Mission Hospital. There is a local police station of the Lesotho Mounted Police Service. Mantšonyane Airport has a 2,300 foot paved runway.

== Notable residents ==
Sam Matekane, a businessman and politician who has served as prime minister of Lesotho since 2022, was born in the town in 1958.
