= Ha Baroana =

Site in Lesotho noted for its early rock art

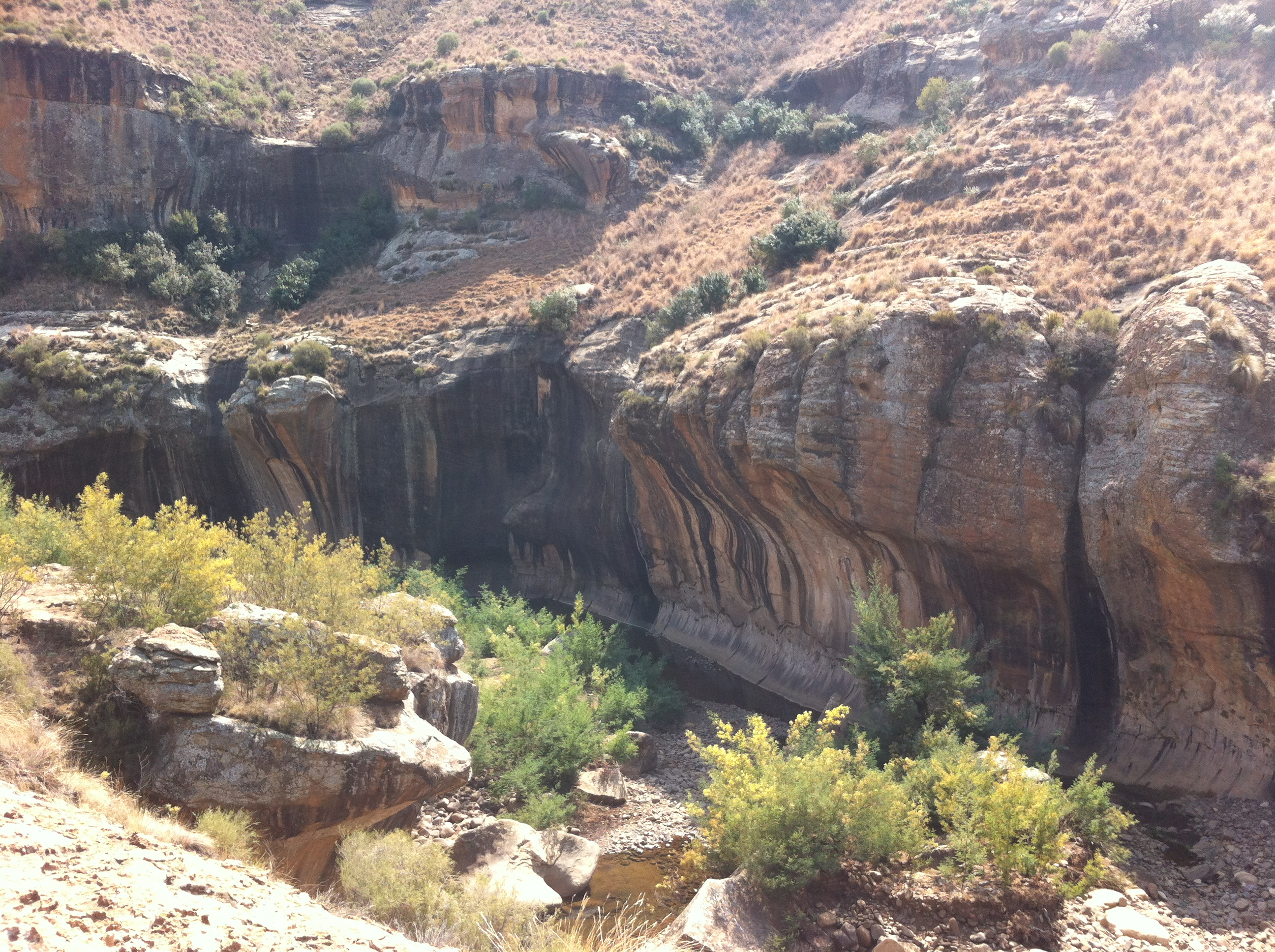
Rocks in Ha Baroana

Ha Baroana is a site in Lesotho noted for its early rock art. The site is located close to Nazareth village, to the east of the capital, Maseru.

The rock art at Ha Baroana primarily depicts humans and animals, reflecting the spiritual beliefs and daily life of the San people who inhabited the region thousands of years ago.

Archaeological and travel sources estimate that the paintings at Ha Baroana were created about 2,000 years ago by early San hunter-gatherers, offering a chronological framework for the development of prehistoric art in the region.

The site is one of several documented rock-art locations in Lesotho, with paintings depicting animal species and human figures that contribute to the study of San artistic traditions in the southern African Highlands.
