= Mokhoabong Pass =

Coordinates: 29.51763°S 28.48044°E

The Mokhoabong Pass is a mountain pass in central Lesotho. The A3 highway crosses this pass between the towns of Mantsonyane and Thaba-Tseka.

== Bibliography ==
- Fitzpatrick, M., Blond, B., Pitcher, G., Richmond, S., and Warren, M. (2004) South Africa, Lesotho and Swaziland. Footscray, VIC: Lonely Planet.
