= A3 highway (Lesotho) =

Road in Lesotho

Coordinates: 29.502684°S 28.830117°E

A3 road

- A3 in Ha-Makhalanyane, Maseru District

Location
- Country: Lesotho

Highway system
- Transport in Lesotho

The A3 is one of the main highways of Lesotho in southern Africa. The A3 crosses the Mokhoabong Pass between the towns of Mantsonyane and Thaba-Tseka.
