= Ramabanta =

Coordinates: 29.665905°S 27.795475°E

Bochabela seen from A5 in Nice Ville

Ramabanta is a town in western Lesotho. It is located southeast of the capital Maseru, and northwest of the 3096 metre peak of Thaba Putsoa.
