= God Help Me Pass =

Coordinates: 29.421°S 27.922°E

The God Help Me Pass, or Lekhalong-la-Molimo-Nthuse in seSotho, is a mountain pass at an elevation of 2,318 m (7,605 ft) in western Lesotho. It is the second mountain pass on the A3 road going into the central highlands. The road ascends steeply from the village of Setibing, and near the summit is the Basotho Pony Trekking Centre, which offers a variety of trekking expeditions. The Makhaleng River flows close by Setibing, and its valley forms the western approach to the pass. The higher Blue Mountain Pass, 2,641 m (8,665 ft), Lekhalong-la-Thaba-Putsoa, is a few kilometres further east, and the first mountain pass, Bushman's Pass, Lekhalong-la-Baroa, 2,266 m (7,434 ft) is about 10 kilometres (6 mi) to the west, rising from the town of Nazareth.
