= Pershing Map =

Blueprint for a U.S. highway system

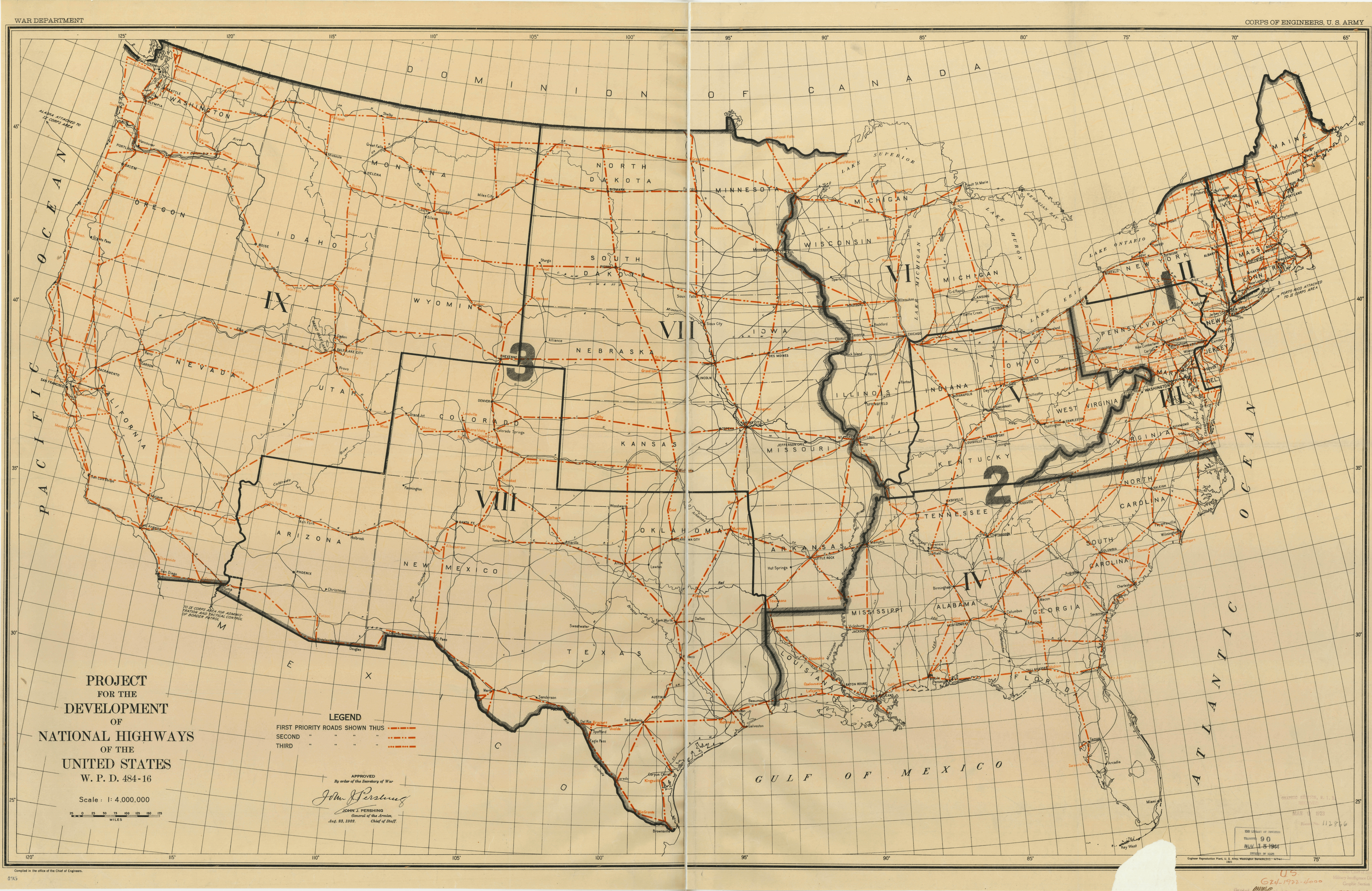
The 1922 Pershing Map for the US National Highways development project.

The Pershing Map was an early blueprint for a national highway system in the United States, with many of the proposed roads later forming a substantial portion of the Interstate Highway System. It's the first official United States road map, and many of the proposed roadways were later incorporated into the current highway system.

== History ==
When the United States Army realized it could not satisfactorily meet its World War I logistical needs by railroad alone, it organized truck convoys to supplement them, with the first run in 1917 from Toledo, Ohio, to Baltimore, Maryland. Following the two-month ordeal of the U.S. Army Transcontinental Motor Convoy in 1919, which included future president Dwight D. Eisenhower, a major proponent of the Interstate Highway System, the need for better infrastructure became even clearer. Having to demolish and rebuild numerous bridges, the 3,400-mile trip took 62 days and averaged just 6 mph. The duration and condition of the journey proved that the nation's interstate roads were in great need of improvement.

In 1921, Thomas H. MacDonald, the newly appointed head of the Bureau of Public Roads, requested the Army provide it with a list of roads of "prime importance in the event of war". MacDonald had the Geological Survey and later his own staff painstakingly draft out the details of the Army's request, and presented the sum of these drawings in a massive 32-foot (9.8 m)-long map to Army War Plans. General of the Armies John Pershing himself reported the results back to Congress in 1922, with the proposal becoming known as the "Pershing Map". Pershing and his staff compiled 78,000 mi (126,000 km) of public roads that were both useful for interconnected interstate travel, and, as the Army felt, for national defense. The map provided an early model for coast-to-coast, connected interstate highways, with additional access between and through major urban areas.

Most of the 78,000 miles (126,000 km) of roads requested were eventually built, with a number of routes becoming interstate highways. The proposal emphasized coastal and Mexican border defense and industrial needs of the time rather than economic development, with high priority routes going to such checkpoints as Sault Ste Marie, Michigan, yet bypassing nearly the entire Deep South. Professor Steven Dutch points out that this routing reflected the technology and needs of the post-World War I military. Coal fields and iron ports were critical for steel production, but the then-nascent oil fields in West Texas and Oklahoma were not yet important, and with little infrastructure, southern Florida was not a priority since any army landing there would have had no method to advance northwards.
