= List of mining disasters in the Democratic Republic of the Congo =

The following is a list of mining disasters in the Democratic Republic of the Congo. Especially in informal artisanal mines, deadly mining accidents are commonplace. Despite the frequency of mining deaths, many incidents are not documented.

- March 2001 – coltan mine 30 miles northwest of Goma in North Kivu province – at least 70 killed in a collapse.
- January 8, 2002 – artisanal coltan mine in Masisi Territory in North Kivu province – about 30 killed in a collapse.
- February 21, 2003 – MIBA mine at Mbuji-Mayi in Kasai Oriental province – 10 or 25 miners die under disputed circumstances.
- October 2004 – artisanal diamond mine near Kapangla village in Kasai Occidental province – 10 killed in a collapse.
- February 21, 2005 – artisanal diamond mine near Kapangla village in Kasai Occidental province – at least 20 killed in a collapse.
- January 5, 2007 – artisanal diamond mine near Tshikapa in Kasaï Province – at least 15 killed in a collapse.
- April 3, 2007 – MIBA mine at Bakwanga in Kasai Oriental province – at least 7 artisanal miners killed by collapse.
- August 19, 2009 – artisanal diamond mine near Mbuji-Mayi in Kasai Oriental province – 18 killed in a collapse.
- August 15, 2012 – artisanal gold mine near Pangoyi in Orientale Province – at least 60 killed in a mine shaft collapse.
- May 2013 – Rubaya mines near Rubaya in North Kivu – at least 20 killed in a mine collapse, or more than 100 artisanal miners killed in a landside.
- December 26, 2014 – artisanal mine near Kolwezi in Katanga Province – 15 suffocate (no landslide).
- September 7, 2015 – artisanal cobalt mine near the village of Mbaya/Mabaya 80 km south of Lubumbashi in Katanga province – 15 miners killed in a cave-in, and an additional 18 killed in similar incidents in the same area the week before.
- March 8, 2016 – KOV mine near Kolwezi in Lualaba Province – 7 employees killed in a collapse.
- November 2016 – Tenke Fungurume Mine in Lualaba Province – 13 artisanal miners killed in a collapse.
- December 2016 – Makungu mine gold mine in Fizi Territory in South Kivu – at least 20 killed in a collapse.
- October 2018 – artisanal gold mine in Fizi Territory in South Kivu province – at least 37 killed in a collapse.
- March 26, 2019 – Niyabibwe artisanal cassiterite mine 100 km north of Bukavu in South Kivu province – 14 killed in a collapse.
- June 27, 2019 – KOV mine near Kolwezi in Lualaba Province – 43 artisanal miners killed in a collapse.
- October 2, 2019 – artisanal gold mine near Kampene in Maniema Province – at least 22 killed in a collapse.
- December 14, 2019 – Ndiyo gold mine in Ituri Province – 24 killed in a landslide.
- September 2020 – artisanal mines in Kasongo territory in Maniema Province – 3 killed in a collapse near Mukulungu, and 9 killed in a landside in another village in the same territory the week before.
- September 11, 2020 – artisanal gold mine near Kamituga in South Kivu province – at least 50 killed when trapped in a collapsed mine shaft.
- May 22, 2021 – artisanal gold mine near Bondo in Bas-Uélé province – 12 killed in a landslide.
- July 2021 – mining at the Catoca diamond mine in Angola contaminates the Kasai River, killing 12 people living downstream in the DRC and sickening about 4,500 people.
- June 7, 2022 – artisanal diamond mine near Tshikapa in Kasaï Province – at least 40 killed in a tunnel collapse.
- November 2022 – artisanal gold mine near Rubaya in North Kivu province – at least 13 killed.
- December 2022 – artisanal gold mines in Fizi Territory in South Kivu – at least 10 killed in mudslides across two sites.
- March 25, 2023 - artisanal gold mine in South Kivu - a collapse in an artisanal gold mine. Nine miners are rescued, and video of their escape is widely shared on social media, sometimes falsely associated with lithium mining.
- May 6, 2023 - illicit artisanal diamond mine near Diboko village in Kasaï Province - a dozen miners killed in a collapse.
- May 8, 2023 - Songambele artisanal coltan mine, located within the Rubaya mines in North Kivu - a provisional count of six deaths with as many as 100 miners trapped.
- January 28, 2026 - a coltan mine in Rubaya collapsed due to heavy rains, killing over 400 people, including women and children.

== See also ==
- List of coal mining accidents in China
- List of mining disasters in Lancashire
- List of mining disasters in Poland
