= Kioko =

Kioko may refer to:

- Chokwe:
  - The Chokwe, a people of Central Africa
  - Chokwe, a language of Central Africa
- Pancana, a language of Indonesia

== See also ==
- Kyoko
