= Kanzala =

Commune of Tshikapa, Democratic Republic of the Congo

- Commune
- Location within Democratic Republic of the Congo
- Coordinates: 6°25′00″S 20°48′00″E
- Country: Democratic Republic of the Congo
- Province: Kasaï
- City: Tshikapa

Kanzala is a commune of the city of Tshikapa in the Kasaï Province of the Democratic Republic of the Congo.

The commune is located in the eastern part of Tshikapa. It is home to the headquarters of many Kasaï Province institutions, and mainly home to the Chokwe people, as opposed to the primarily Luba and Pende populations of other Tshikana communes.
