= Mabondo =

Commune of Tshikapa, Democratic Republic of the Congo

- Commune
- Location within Democratic Republic of the Congo
- Coordinates: 6°25′00″S 20°48′00″E
- Country: Democratic Republic of the Congo
- Province: Kasaï
- City: Tshikapa

Mabondo is a commune of the city of Tshikapa in the Kasaï Province of the Democratic Republic of the Congo.

It is largely inhabited by the Luba people, and located on Kele hill. Mabondo and the neighboring commune of Mbumba were without reliable running water for three years after the bridge over the Kasai River (which also held water pipes connected to the communes) collapsed in 2020.
