= Hendo =

The term "Hendo" may refer to the following:

- The nickname of various people with the "Henderson" surname, including the following:
  - Dan Henderson (born 1970), an American mixed martial artist and Olympic wrestler
  - Henry Crump 3rd (born 1988), an American music artist, music producer and entertainer
  - Dean Henderson (Born 1997), an English football goalkeeper
  - Jordan Henderson (born 1990), an English football player
  - Holly Henderson (born 2000), a Scottish/English Tik Tok influencer
- A bachelorette party in U.K., Irish, & Canadian vernacular, a.k.a. "Hen(s) do"
- Hendo language, a Bantu language indigenous to Dekese territory in the Democratic Republic of the Congo
- Hendo Hover, an American hoverboard company
- Henderson's Relish, a spicy condiment made in Sheffield, UK. Often locally referred to as "Hendos".
