= Bushoong languages =

Bushoong
- Linguistic classification: Niger–Congo?: Atlantic–Congo; Benue–Congo; Southern Bantoid; Bantu (Zone C.80); Bangi–Tetela?; Bushoong

Language codes
- ISO 639-3: –
- Glottolog: bush1251 (Bushoong–Wongo–Lele) song1305 (Ohendo)

The Bushoong languages are a clade of Bantu languages coded Zone C.80 in Guthrie's classification. According to Nurse & Philippson (2003), apart from Dengese and the Shuwa "dialect" of Bushoong, the languages form a valid node. They are:

1. Hendo (Songomeno)
2. Bushoong
3. Lele
4. Wongo
