= Tetela languages =

Zone C.70 Guthries Clasaificafion

Tetela
- Linguistic classification: Niger–Congo?: Atlantic–Congo; Benue–Congo; Southern Bantoid; Bantu (Zone C.70); Bangi–Tetela?; Tetela

Language codes
- ISO 639-3: –
- Glottolog: kusu1254 (Tetela + Bushoong)

The Tetela languages are a clade of Bantu languages coded Zone C.70 in Guthrie's classification. According to Nurse & Philippson (2003), together with C.81 Dengese and C.89, the Shuwa "dialect" of Bushoong, the languages form a valid node. They are:

Tetela–Hamba, Kusu, Nkutu, Yela, Ombo, (C80) Dengese, Shuwa (Pianga)

However, Yela is the same language as Kela, which is classified differently.

Maho (2009) adds Langa to C.70.
