= Kasai diamond mine collapse =

- Date: 7 June 2022
- Location: Tshikapa, Kasai Province, Democratic Republic of the Congo
- Type: mine collapse
- Deaths: 40+
- Injuries: 0

On 7 June 2022, a tunnel collapsed inside a diamond mine near the city of Tshikapa, in the Kasaï Province of the Democratic Republic of the Congo. At least six people were confirmed to have been killed. Local officials stated that the incident took place near the town of Samba, where more than 40 people had been killed, with six bodies uncovered.
