= Mbumba =

Mbumba may refer to:

- Mbumba (commune), commune of the city of Tshikapa in the Democratic Republic of the Congo
- Ariel Mbumba (born 2001), Congolese footballer
- John M'Bumba (born 1983), French boxer
- Nangolo Mbumba (born 1941), Namibian politician
- Nathaniel Mbumba, Zairean rebel leader
