= Dekese =

- Commune
- Location in the Democratic Republic of the Congo
- Coordinates: 3.491832°S 21.376648°E
- Country: DR Congo
- Province: Kasai
- Territory: Dekese
- Time zone: UTC+02:00 (Central Africa Time)
- Climate: Am

Dekese is a community in the Democratic Republic of the Congo, on the right bank of the Lukenie River. It is the administrative center of the Dekese territory of Kasai province.

== History ==
Dekese was founded as a colonial post by Alexandre Delcommune around 1888. The territory is isolated. Roads are impassable and radio reception is very poor.

The region suffered badly during the Second Congo War. In December 2001 there was an Ebola scare. Uganda, which was occupying the area, decided to screen all soldiers on their return home. The Kinshasa government asked the World Health Organization to help open a humanitarian corridor so they could also use the general hospital and medical personnel of Dekese. However, the illness had a much lower death rate than Ebola, with most of the victims being children under five and adults over 55, and appeared to be a respiratory disease. In October 2006 an outbreak of monkeypox was reported. The isolation of the region made it difficult to fight the epidemic.

The territory suffered from continued communal conflicts. In 2010, of 176 such conflicts reported in the former Kasaï Occidental province, 38 were in Dekese Territory. In May 2011, after the governor of Kasai Occidental had been removed from office and a few days before the election of his successor, 40 soldiers arrived in Dekese, first in the town and then spreading out into the territory. They committed abuses including arbitrary arrests, looting and rape of women and minors. The purpose seemed to be to disrupt the elections.

== Transportation ==
Dekese has an associated airport nearby.
