= Shongo =

Shongo may refer to:

- Shongo, a sometimes multi-bladed throwing knife of the Azande people and other central Africans
- Shongo or shrongo, an archaic name for the shogun, the military ruler of Japan
- Shongo, an alternative name of Bushong, a language of Kasai Province, Democratic Republic of the Congo
- Shongo, New York, a hamlet in Willing in the United States
- Shongo, a village in the Allegany Indian Reservation of New York
- Shongo, a village in Kirfi, Bauchi State, Nigeria
