= Chokwe =

Chokwe may refer to:

- Chokwe people, a Central African ethnic group
  - Chokwe language, a Bantu language
- Chokwe or Tshokwe, Botswana, a village
- Chokwe, Malawi
- Chókwè District, Mozambique
  - Chokwe, Mozambique, a town and capital of the district
