= Dekese Airport =

- IATA: none; ICAO: FZVT

Summary
- Serves: Dekese
- Elevation AMSL: 1,279 ft (390 m)
- Coordinates: 3°30′23″S 21°24′25″E

Map
- Location of airport in the Democratic Republic of the Congo

Runways
Direction	Length		Surface
Direction	m	ft	Surface
09/27	1,140	3,740	Grass
- Source: Google Maps, Great Circle Mapper

Dekese Airport (ICAO: FZVT) is an airport serving the community of Dekese in Kasaï Province, Democratic Republic of the Congo.

== See also ==
- Transport in the Democratic Republic of the Congo
- List of airports in the Democratic Republic of the Congo
