= Dibumba II =

Commune of the city of Tshikapa in the Democratic Republic of the Congo

- Commune
- Location within Democratic Republic of the Congo
- Coordinates: 6°25′00″S 20°48′00″E
- Country: Democratic Republic of the Congo
- Province: Kasaï
- City: Tshikapa

Dibumba II is a commune of the city of Tshikapa in the Kasaï Province of the Democratic Republic of the Congo. It is largely inhabited by the Pende people, and has been the site of antagonism against the Luba people.
