= TSH =

TSH may refer to:

- Tanzanian shilling, the currency of Tanzania
- Thyroid-stimulating hormone, a family of glycoprotein hormones in vertebrata
- Tsh (trigraph), a trigraph in various alphabets using Latin script
- Tshiuetin Rail Transportation, a Canadian railway, reporting mark
- Tsuvan language, an Afro-Asiatic language of Cameroon, ISO 639-3 code

== Places ==
- Tai Shui Hang station, Hong Kong, MTR station code
- Topeka State Hospital, Kansas, US
- Tshikapa Airport, Democratic Republic of the Congo, IATA code
