= Ombo language =

Language

Ombo
- Native to: Democratic Republic of the Congo
- Region: Maniema Province
- Native speakers: 8,400 (2002)
- Language family: Niger–Congo?: Atlantic–Congo; Benue–Congo; Bantoid; Bantu (Zone C); Tetela (C.70); Ombo

Language codes
- ISO 639-3: oml
- Glottolog: ombo1238
- Guthrie code: C.76

Ombo is a Bantu language of Maniema Province, Democratic Republic of the Congo.
