= Chikunga =

Ritual mask of the Chokwe people

Chikunga, also spelled Chikungu, Cikunga, and Cikungu, is a ritual mask of the Chokwe people of Central and Southern Africa. The Chokwe consider it their most powerful mask, and it is only worn by the chief and his heirs. It is the largest Chokwe mask, and is composed of a barkcloth extended over a wicker frame, covered in resin and painted. It is only used on particular occasions, otherwise being stowed away in a hut in the bush.

== Power and importance ==
Chikunga is one of three types of masks in Chokwe religion, alongside those used in the Mukanda ritual, and those used in dance. It is held as the most powerful mask, which is sacred and "highly charged". It is an embodiment of the forebears of the chief, and only he and his heirs are permitted to wear it.

It is the equivalent of Kayipu of the Luvale people, which is considered the "king" of the makishi, masked characters personated in ceremonies related to coming of age. Manuel Jordán, in his 2006 study of Zambian masks, cites Chikunga and Kayipu as examples of the "royal" category of masks.

== Appearance ==
Chikunga is the largest of the Chokwe ritual masks. It consists of a wicker frame, over which barkcloth is spread; this is coated with resin, and decorated with red and white paint. On the front and back of the headdress is a large "fan-like structure", according to Marie-Louise Bastin, while on the sides are "wings or large disks"; this headdress symbolises the stork Sphenorhynchus abdimi. It features a saw-tooth design known as "viper of the stork" (yenge lya khumbi), a reference to animal stories in Chokwe belief.

Chikunga serves as the basis for the design of a number of less important masks, which feature in Mukanda rituals.

== Usage ==
The chief only wears the Chikunga on particular, infrequent occasions. It features in the ceremony of the chief's installation, in sacrifices to ancestors, and in rituals designed to dispel perils facing the chief or his subjects. When not in use, it is concealed in the bush in a small hut, which has an appointed guard. When it is brought out, both men and women hide in their huts because it is believed looking at it puts a person in danger, except if they are a chief or another important individual. The chief dresses in a long, black skirt when wearing the mask, and carries a sword or rifle. He declares his presence with what Bastin describes as a "kind of small kazoo", which is joined to the inside of the mask at the mouth.
