= Tshikapa Airport =

- IATA: TSH; ICAO: FZUK

Summary
- Airport type: Public
- Location: Tshikapa, Democratic Republic of the Congo
- Elevation AMSL: 1,595 ft (486 m)
- Coordinates: 06°26′18″S 020°47′41″E

Map
- Location of Airport in Democratic Republic of the Congo

Runways
Direction	Length		Surface
Direction	m	ft	Surface
16/34	1,600	5,249	Gravel
- Sources: GCM Google Maps

Tshikapa Airport (IATA: TSH, ICAO: FZUK) is an airport serving Tshikapa in Kasaï Province, Democratic Republic of the Congo.

== Accidents and incidents ==
In 1988, Vickers Viscount 9Q-CTS of Filair was damaged beyond economic repair in a landing accident.

== See also ==
- List of airports in the Democratic Republic of the Congo
