= Langa language =

Bantu language of DR Congo

Langa
- Native to: Democratic Republic of the Congo
- Language family: Niger–Congo?: Atlantic–Congo; Benue–Congo; Bantoid; Bantu (Zone C); Tetela (C.70); Langa

Language codes
- ISO 639-3: –
- Glottolog: lang1321
- Guthrie code: C.701

Langa is a Bantu language of Maniema Province, Democratic Republic of the Congo.
