= Bushong language =

Bantu language spoken in Democratic Republic of Congo

Bushong
- Bushoong
- Native to: Democratic Republic of the Congo
- Region: Kuba Kingdom, Kasai Province
- Native speakers: (160,000, incl. Shuwa cited 2000)
- Language family: Niger–Congo?: Atlantic–Congo; Volta-Congo; Benue–Congo; Bantoid; Southern Bantoid; Bantu (Zone C); Bushoong languages (C.80); Bushong

Language codes
- ISO 639-3: buf
- Glottolog: bush1247
- Guthrie code: C.83

Bushong is a Bantu language of the Kasai Province of Democratic Republic of the Congo. It was the language of the Kuba Kingdom.

Alternative names are Bushongo, Bushoong, Busoong, Shongo, Ganga, Kuba, Mbale, Bamongo, Mongo.

Dialects are said to be Djembe, Ngende, Ngombe (Ngombia), Ngongo, Pianga (Panga, Tsobwa, Shobwa, Shoba). Pianga (Shuwa) is a distinct language, in the Tetela group.

The Bushong have a patron–client relationship with the Kasai Twa.
