= Tetela language =

Bantu language of the DR Congo

Tetela
- Ɔtɛtɛla
- Native to: Democratic Republic of the Congo
- Region: Northern Kasai Oriental Province
- Ethnicity: Tetela people
- Native speakers: (760,000 cited 1991)
- Language family: Niger–Congo?: Atlantic–Congo; Volta-Congo; Benue–Congo; Bantoid; Southern Bantoid; Bantu (Zone C); Tetela languages (C.70); Tetela

Language codes
- ISO 639-3: Either: tll – Tetela hba – Hamba
- Glottolog: tete1250 Tetela hamb1245 Hamba
- Guthrie code: C.71

Tetela (Otetela, Kitetela, Kikitatela), also Sungu, is a Bantu language of northern Kasai-Oriental Province, Democratic Republic of the Congo. It is spoken by the Tetela people.

== Phonology ==
=== Consonants ===
		Labial	Alveolar	Palatal	Velar	Glottal
Nasal		m	n	ɲ	ŋ	
Plosive/ Affricate	voiceless	p	t	t͡ʃ	k	
Plosive/ Affricate	voiced	b	d	d͡ʒ	(ɡ)	
Plosive/ Affricate	prenasal	ᵐb	ⁿd	ᶮd͡ʒ	ᵑɡ	
Fricative	voiceless	f	s	ʃ		h
Fricative	voiced	v				
Fricative	prenasal	ᶬv				
Lateral			l			
Approximant				j	w	

- [ɡ] is heard as an allophone of /k/ in intervocalic positions.

=== Vowels ===
	Front	Central	Back
Close	i		u
Close-mid	e		o
Open-mid	ɛ		ɔ
Open		a	

== Noun classes ==
Like other Bantu languages, Tetela grammar arranges nouns into a number of classes. The ancestral system had 22 classes (counting singular and plural as distinct according to the Meinhof system), with most Bantu languages sharing at least ten of them.

class	semantics	prefix	singular	translation	plural	translation
1, 2	persons	o-/ɔ-/w-, a-	omfúnjí	scribe, secretary	amfúnjí	scribes, secretaries
3, 4	trees, etc	o-/ɔ-/w-, e-/ɛ-	ojja	place	ejja	places; region
5, 6	various	di-/dy-, a-	dihamvú	fruit of Chrysophyllum lacourtianum	ahamvú	fruits of Chrysophyllum lacourtianum
7, 8	various	ke-/e-, di-/dy-	kesashi	chief	disashi	chiefs
9, 10	animals, etc	Ø-/N-, Ø-/N-	mbódí	goat	mbódí	goats
11, 10	abstract concepts, etc	lo-, N-	lolémí	language	némí	languages
12, 13	various	ka-/k-, to-/t-	kashikɛ	helmet (from French casque)	toshikɛ	helmets
19, 13	various	°i- (complex morphology), to-/t-	jɔ́ndɔ́	???	tɔlɔ́ndɔ́	???

== Relevant literature ==
- Elysee Meta Okubo. 2016. A COLLECTION OF 100 TETELA PROVERBS. Proverb website
- Mukanga, Ndjeka Elizabeth, Empenge Albert Shefu, Ambaye Albertine Tshefu. 2020. Great Collection of Tetela Proverbs on the African Wisdom. Pittsburgh: Dorrance Publishers. [283 proverbs, 107 pages]
