= 2026 Rubaya mines collapses =

Mine collapse in the DRC

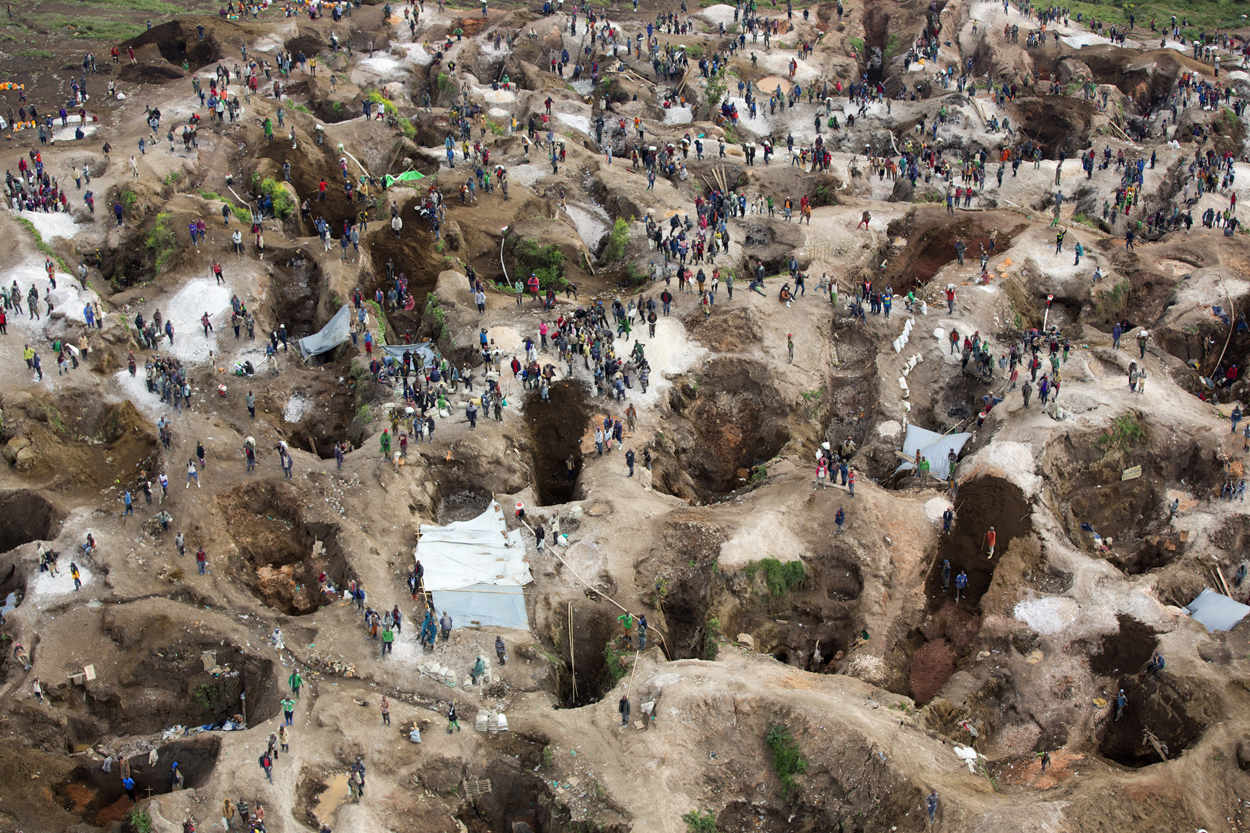
- The Rubaya mines in 2014

- The Rubaya mines are located in North Kivu province of the DRC.
- Date: 28 January and 3 March 2026
- Location: Rubaya mines; 1.567°S 28.887°E
- Cause: Landslides caused by heavy rain
- Deaths: 600+
- Injuries: ~20+

On 28 January 2026, a severe collapse occurred at the Rubaya mines in the Democratic Republic of the Congo (DRC). Initially, 200 people were estimated to have been killed in the collapse, but by 2 February, more than 400 deaths were confirmed in the incident. The mine collapse was caused by a landslide that was the result of years of poor mining practices and a lack of maintenance. Several individual mines collapsed in the landslide.

On 3 March 2026, a second landslide collapsed a mine at the same site, killing over 200 people, injured others and left some missing.

== Background ==
The Rubaya mines in the eastern DRC have been controlled by M23 rebels since May 2024. M23 has since imposed taxes on coltan, which is mined at Rubaya, amounting to over $800,000 per month. The Rubaya mines account for over 15% of the world's tantalum supply. Mine tunnels are often dug by hand with little oversight and without safety measures. The tunnels are over-mined and left without maintenance for years. Up to 500 miners could work in one mining pit.

== First collapse ==
Heavy rains caused a major landslide at the Rubaya mines on 28 January 2026. Two landslides were reported: one on the afternoon of 28 January and one on the morning of 29 January. Several individual mines collapsed as a result of the landslides. The collapse occurred at the Luwowo mining site in Rubaya.

=== Aftermath ===
At first 200 people were estimated to have been killed in the first collapse, including children and women. However, rescue efforts were complicated by mud, and not all bodies were recovered. Around 20 injured miners were taken to hospitals in the town of Rubaya and the nearest large city, Goma. An anonymous DRC official said that 227 people had been killed; however, this has not been confirmed. On February 2, more than 400 deaths were confirmed in the incident, most of the dead being artisanal miners, but also children, small traders who worked in the vicinity of the mine and residents of the surrounding villages, some of which were destroyed by the collapse.

The M23-appointed governor of North Kivu province, Erasto Bahati Musanga, halted artisanal mining at the Rubaya mines site. Some residents had built shelters in the area near the mines and were ordered to relocate. The mines were reopened by February 2, despite a number of miners still being missing.

The Government of the DRC issued a statement accusing M23 of illegally running the mines while M23 accused the government of politicizing the collapse.

== Second collapse ==
The second landslide at the site on 3 March 2026 collapsed a mine, killing more than 200 people, among them 70 children, according to the government. The Congolese mines ministry blamed the landslide on M23, accusing the group of allowing illegal mining to continue without proper safety standards. M23 did not comment officially, but a source in Rubaya told the BBC that the collapse had been caused by attacks by government forces and that only six people had died. Al Jazeera reports that the second collapse was fueled by heavy rainfall.

=== Aftermath ===
More than 200 people were killed in the second collapse, including around 70 minors, food vendors, miners, other small-scale traders and women. Multiple people were seriously injured while others were reported missing.
