= Yela-Kela language =

Language

Kela
- Yela
- Native to: Democratic Republic of the Congo
- Region: Kasai (Kela), Equateur Province (Yela)
- Native speakers: (180,000 Kela, 33,000 Yela cited 1972 and 1977)
- Language family: Niger–Congo?: Atlantic–Congo; Benue–Congo; Bantoid; Bantu (Zone C); Bangi–Ntomba (C.30, traditionally C.70 Tetela); Mongo; Kela

Language codes
- ISO 639-3: Either: kel – Kela yel – Yela
- Glottolog: yela1238
- Guthrie code: C.74, 75

Kela (Ikela, Okela), or Lemba, and Yela are a Bantu language of the Democratic Republic of the Congo spoken by several hundred thousand people in the Kasai-Oriental, where the spoken dialect is "Kela", and Équateur Province, where the spoken dialect is "Yela".
