= Hendo language =

Bantu language spoken in DR Congo

Hendo
- Songomeno
- Ohendo
- Native to: Democratic Republic of the Congo
- Native speakers: (50,000 cited 1982)
- Language family: Niger–Congo?: Atlantic–Congo; Benue–Congo; Bantoid; Bantu (Zone C); Bushoong (C.80); Hendo

Language codes
- ISO 639-3: soe
- Glottolog: song1305
- Guthrie code: C.82

Hendo, also known as Songomeno, is a Bantu language in Dekese territory (Kasai province), Democratic Republic of the Congo.
