= Nkutu language =

Bantu language of DR Congo

Nkutu
- Native to: Democratic Republic of the Congo
- Region: Northern Kasai Oriental Province
- Native speakers: (40,000 cited 1972)
- Language family: Niger–Congo?: Atlantic–Congo; Benue–Congo; Bantoid; Bantu (Zone C); Tetela (C.70); Nkutu

Language codes
- ISO 639-3: nkw
- Glottolog: nkut1238
- Guthrie code: C.73

Nkutu (Nkuchu, Kitkutshu) is a Bantu language of northern Kasai-Oriental Province, Democratic Republic of the Congo. It is a member of the Tetela group of Bantu languages.
