= Shuwa language =

Bushong dialect of DR Congo

Shuwa
- Pianga
- Loshoobo
- Native to: Democratic Republic of the Congo
- Region: Kasai-Oriental
- Language family: Niger–Congo?: Atlantic–Congo; Benue–Congo; Bantoid; Bantu (Zone C); Bushoong (C.80); Shuwa

Language codes
- ISO 639-3: None (mis)
- Glottolog: pian1241
- Guthrie code: C.83d

Shuwa (Shoobo), or Pianga (Pyaang), once considered a dialect of Bushong, is a Bantu language of Kasai-Oriental Province, Democratic Republic of the Congo.
