= Dengese language =

Bantu language spoken in DR Congo

Dengese
- Native to: Democratic Republic of the Congo
- Region: Northern Kasai Oriental Province
- Native speakers: (8,600 cited 2000)
- Language family: Niger–Congo?: Atlantic–Congo; Benue–Congo; Bantoid; Bantu (Zone C); Tetela (C.70); Dengese

Language codes
- ISO 639-3: dez
- Glottolog: deng1250
- Guthrie code: C.81

Dengese (Lengese, Ndengese) is a Bantu language of northern Kasai-Oriental Province, Democratic Republic of the Congo.
