= Dekese Territory =

Dekese
- Territory
- Interactive map of Dekese
- Coordinates: 3.491832°S 21.376648°E
- Country: DR Congo
- Province: Kasai
- Seat: Dekese
- Time zone: UTC+02:00 (CAT)
- National language: Tshiluba

Dekese Territory is an administrative area of Kasai province of the Democratic Republic of the Congo. The administrative center is the town of Dekese.

The territory is isolated. Roads are impassable and radio reception is very poor. The territory suffers from continued communal conflicts. In 2010, of 176 such conflicts reported in Kasaï Occidental province, 38 were in Dekese Territory. In May 2011, after the former governor of Kasai Occidental had been removed from office and a few days before the election of his successor, 40 soldiers arrived in Dekese, first in the town and then spreading out into the territory. They committed abuses including arbitrary arrests, looting, and rape of women and minors. The purpose seemed to be to disrupt the elections.

Dekese Territory contains one health zones named Dekese health zone.
