= Wongo language =

Bantu language of DR Congo

Wongo
- Tukongo
- Native to: Democratic Republic of the Congo
- Native speakers: (13,000 cited 2000)
- Language family: Niger–Congo?: Atlantic–Congo; Benue–Congo; Bantoid; Bantu (Zone C); Bushoong (C.80); Wongo

Language codes
- ISO 639-3: won
- Glottolog: wong1247
- Guthrie code: C.85

Wongo is a Bantu language in Kasai-Occidental Province, Democratic Republic of the Congo.
