= Rubaya =

Mining town in North Kivu Province, Democratic Republic of the Congo

- Town
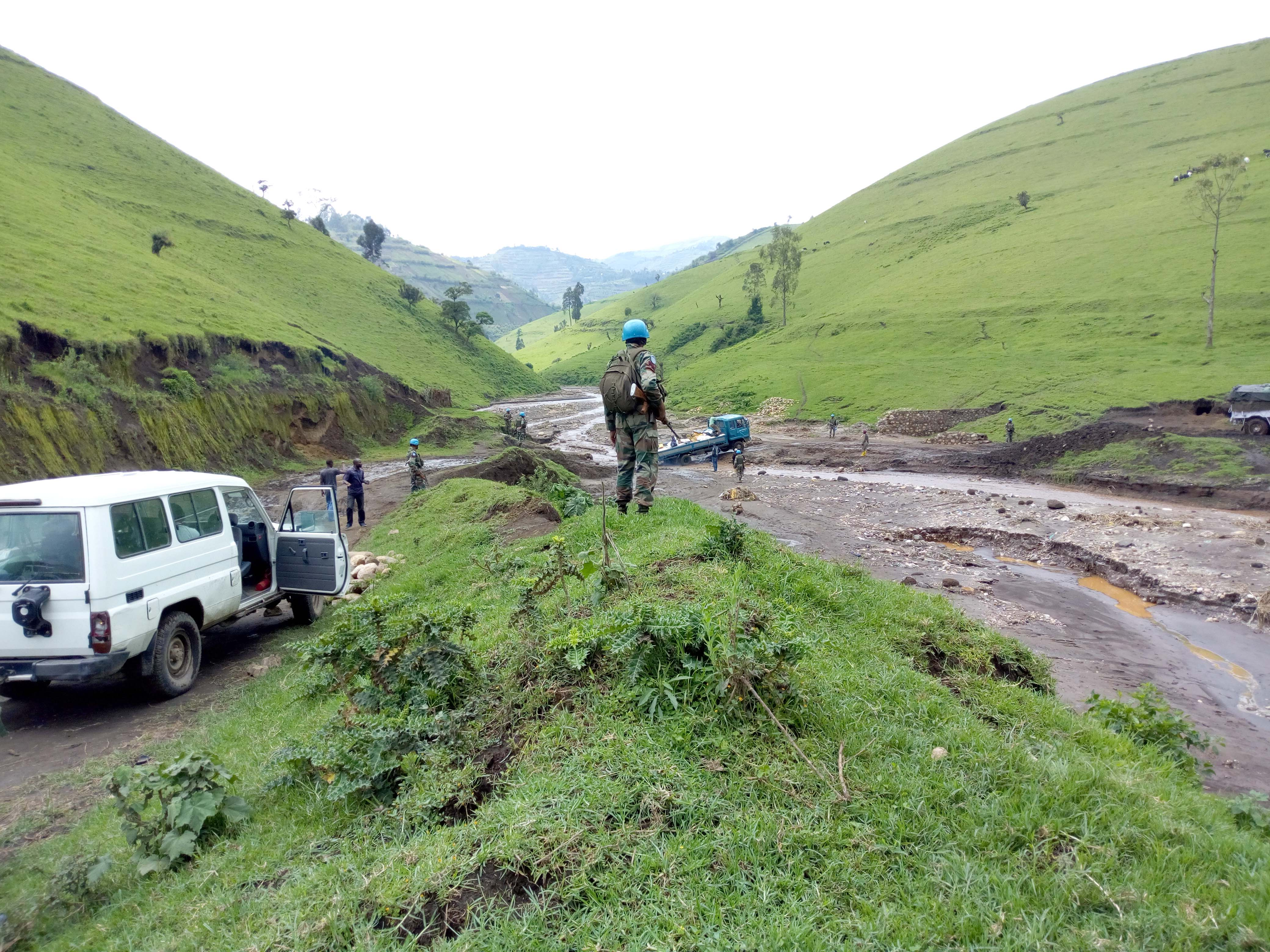
- Hills in Rubaya
- Interactive map of Rubaya
- Rubaya in the Democratic Republic of the Congo
- Coordinates: 1°32′46.5″S 28°52′24.7″E

Rubaya is a mining town in Masisi Territory, North Kivu Province, Democratic Republic of the Congo. It is 70 km (45 miles) to the west of Goma, the capital of North Kivu Province. As of March 2026, the town is currently under control of rebels from the Rwandan-backed rebel paramilitary group, the March 23 Movement (M23), as part of the Second M23 rebellion.

== History ==
On 2 May 2024, M23 rebels issued a statement that said they had seized Rubaya for its deposits of tantalum, a type of metal extracted from coltan that is used in the production of smartphones. The rebels then imposed taxes on the export and transport of coltan.
