= Tshikapa =

- Provincial capital and city
- Ville de Tshikapa
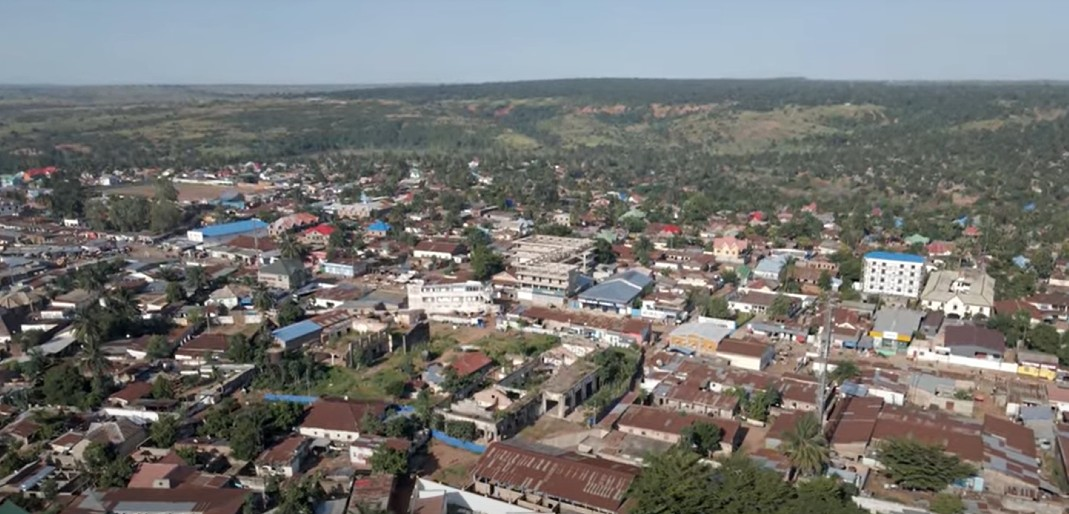
- An overhead view of Tshikapa

- Location in the Democratic Republic of the Congo
- Coordinates: 6°25′S 20°48′E
- Country: Democratic Republic of the Congo
- Province: Kasaï
- City status: 2003
- Named for: Tshikapa River
- Communes: Dibumba I, Dibumba II, Kanzala, Mabondo, Mbumba

Government
  - Mayor: Faustin Lumuluabo

Area
  - Urban: 38 km^{2} (15 sq mi)
- Elevation: 485 m (1,591 ft)

Population (2016 estimate)
  - Urban: 732,000
  - Urban density: 19,000/km^{2} (50,000/sq mi)
  - City: 267,462
- Time zone: UTC+2 (Central Africa Time)
- Climate: Aw

Tshikapa is the capital city of Kasaï Province in the Democratic Republic of the Congo. The city is located 60 km (37 mi) north of the Angolan border and 189 km (117 mi) west of Kananga at the confluence of the Tshikapa and Kasai rivers. According to records published by the Utrecht University library, the population of the city grew from 38,900 in 1970 to 180,900 in 1994. However, the Congo wars and the Kamwina Nsapu rebellion triggered waves of internal displacement, with many residents fleeing violence or relocating temporarily. The World Population Review estimates the 2025 population of Tshikapa and its urban agglomeration at 1,185,920.

Tshikapa has been a site of diamond mining since its founding in the early 20th century. The city was founded by Forminière, an American/Belgian mining consortium which discovered diamonds near this location in the early 1900s.

The city is served by the Tshikapa Airport. The diamond industry is the main form of income for the city. Despite this, it is poor and few of the roads are paved.

== History ==
Tshikapa was founded in the early 1900s by the American-Belgian mining consortium Forminière. The city grew rapidly as result of the First Congo War and now has a large population of internally displaced people. In April 2020, the 78-year old N1 Highway Bridge collapsed into the Kasai River causing significant interruptions to the regional transportation network and economy.

== Orientation ==
The city is set at the confluence of the Tshikapa and Kasai rivers and the meeting of the R706 and N01 highways. The city consists largely of 1- and 2-story mudbrick structures with metal roofing while the core of the city to the south of the river confluence has some structures with additional floors. A second bridge across the Kasai river to the north of the confluence was constructed in 2014. There is a water treatment plant located in the center of the at the junction of the R706 and N01 highways. The Tshikapa Airport is located on the southern edge of the city center. The city has 67 primary and 36 secondary schools.

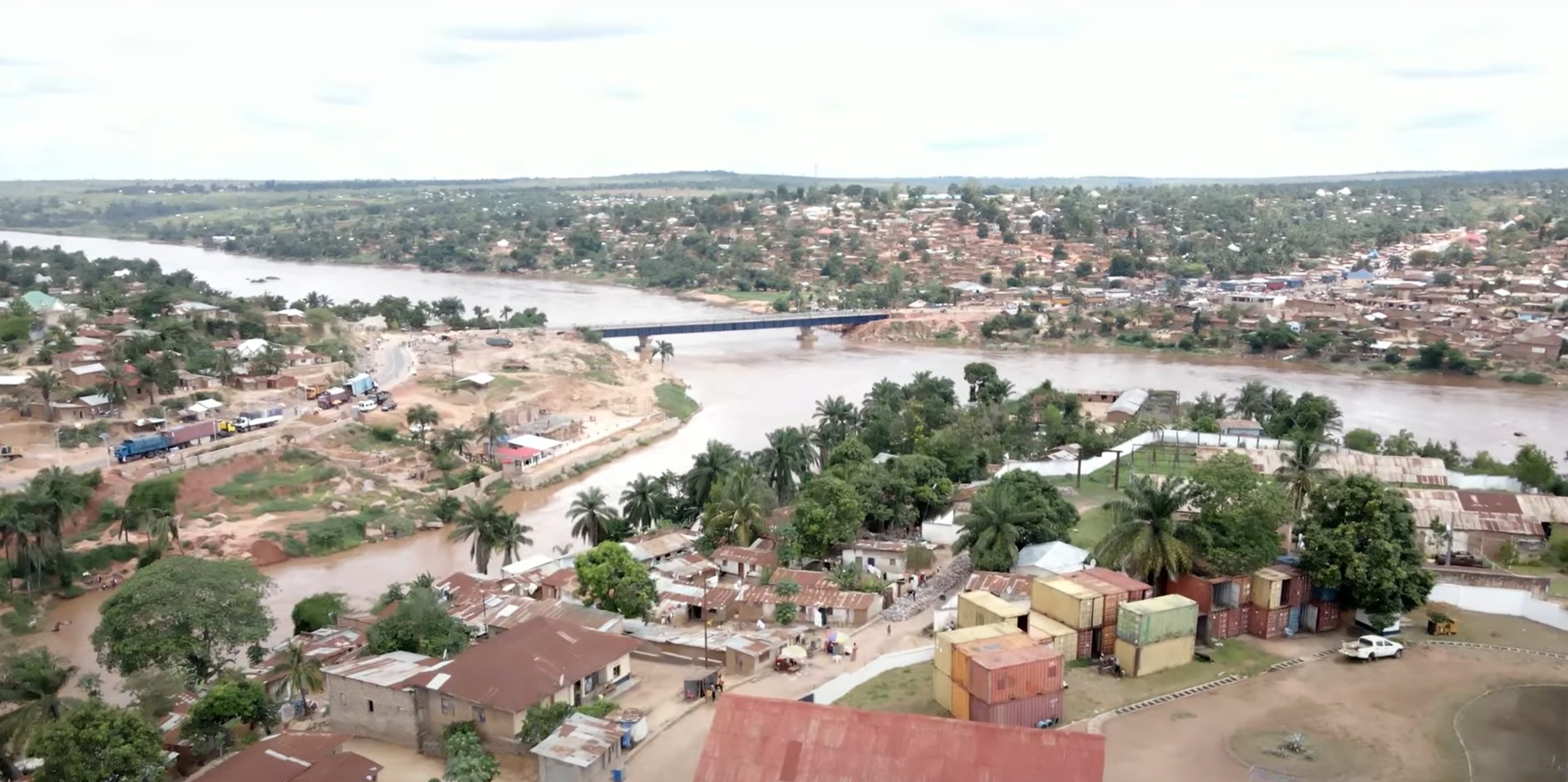
The new Kasai River Bridge at Tshikapa

As of 2014, the city of Tshikapa has 3 hospitals, 15 hotels, six Regional Institutes, one court, one town hall, one central bank local office and an under-construction water treatment facility. Apart from Tshikapa, only two out of the six permanent markets were numbered along the two primary roads in town. Most markets in the city are lacking basic business infrastructure in that the majority of products are displayed on the ground or in makeshift stalls. The road between Batshamba and Tshikapa was reconstructed between 2012 and 2019 providing safer access to the city.

Tshikapa has two football stadiums, one located to the north of the Tshikapa River called Dibumba Stadium and one to the south of the river called Kanzala Stadium. The city is located 125 km to the north of the Angolan Border Crossing at Dundo. Kabodi is the town located nearest to the east, Sami to the south, Katshongo to the west and Mutena to the north.

== Economy ==
The economic main activities are agriculture and diamond digging in Kasai Province. Tshikapa is the only town in the province with administrative services. The city has limited access to electricity, gas and clean drinking water.

== Climate ==
Tshikapa has a tropical savanna climate (Köppen Aw), fairly typical of the western Democratic Republic of Congo, with a dry season entered upon June and July and a lengthy though not intense wet season from September to May.

Climate data for Tshikapa
Month	Jan	Feb	Mar	Apr	May	Jun	Jul	Aug	Sep	Oct	Nov	Dec	Year
Mean daily maximum °C (°F)	29 (85)	29 (85)	30 (86)	30 (86)	31 (87)	31 (88)	29 (85)	30 (86)	29 (85)	29 (85)	29 (85)	29 (84)	30 (86)
Mean daily minimum °C (°F)	20 (68)	20 (68)	20 (68)	20 (68)	20 (68)	18 (64)	17 (63)	19 (66)	19 (67)	20 (68)	20 (68)	20 (68)	19 (67)
Average rainfall mm (inches)	120 (4.7)	110 (4.5)	190 (7.3)	150 (6.1)	81 (3.2)	13 (0.5)	18 (0.7)	51 (2)	120 (4.6)	150 (5.8)	230 (9.2)	210 (8.1)	1,443 (56.7)
Source: Weatherbase

== Gallery ==
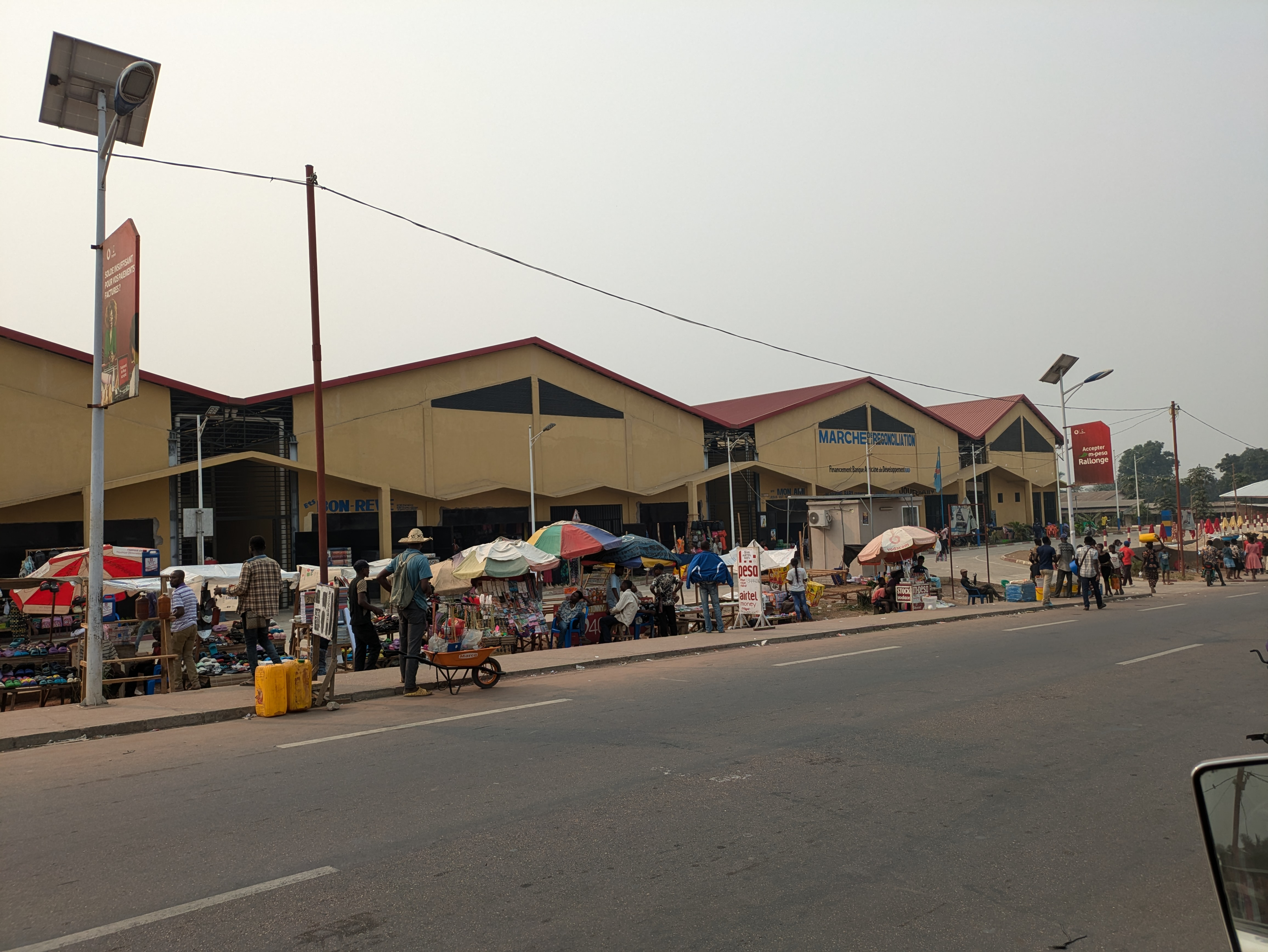
Market of Reconciliation.

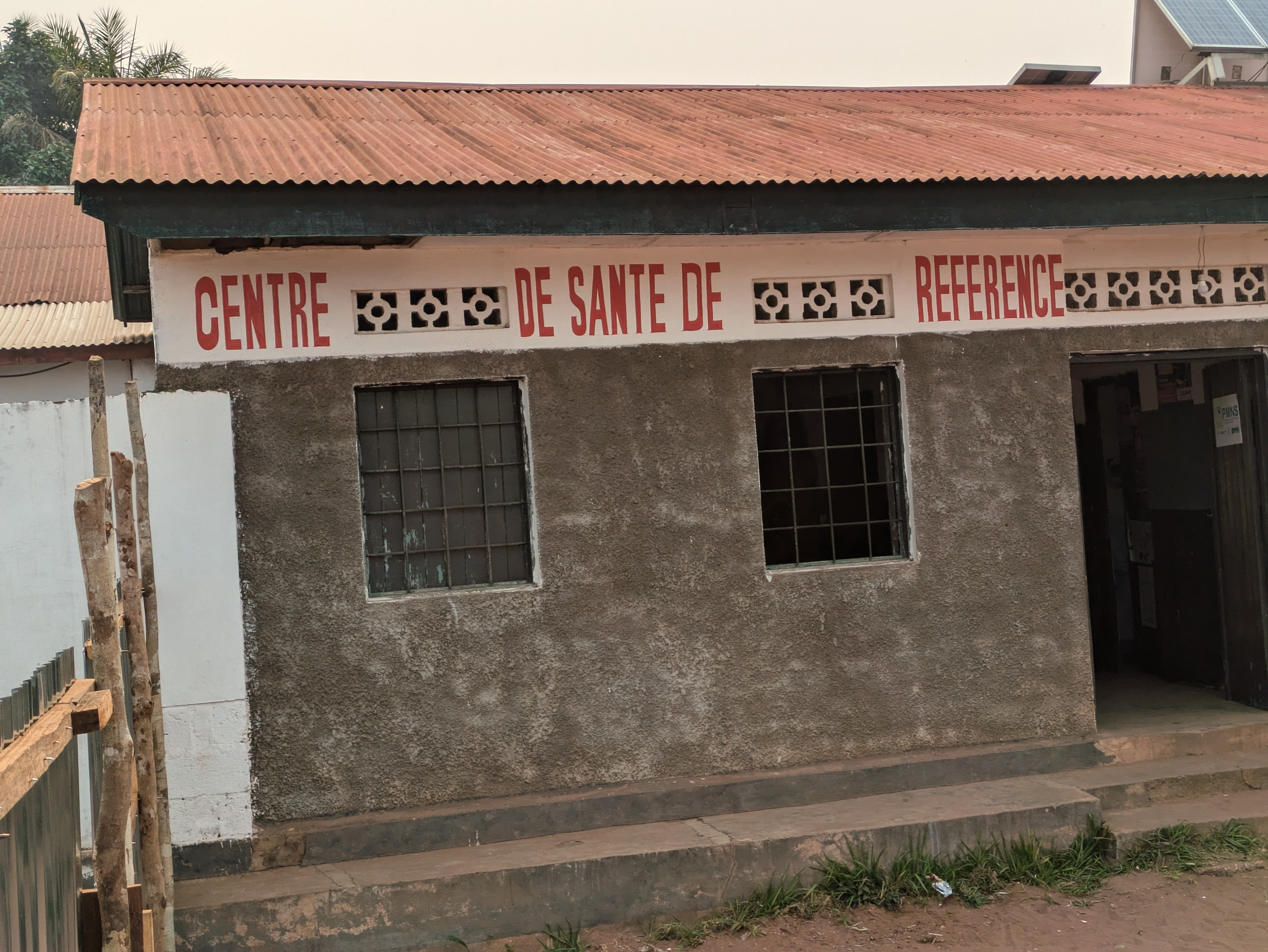
Referral Hospital.

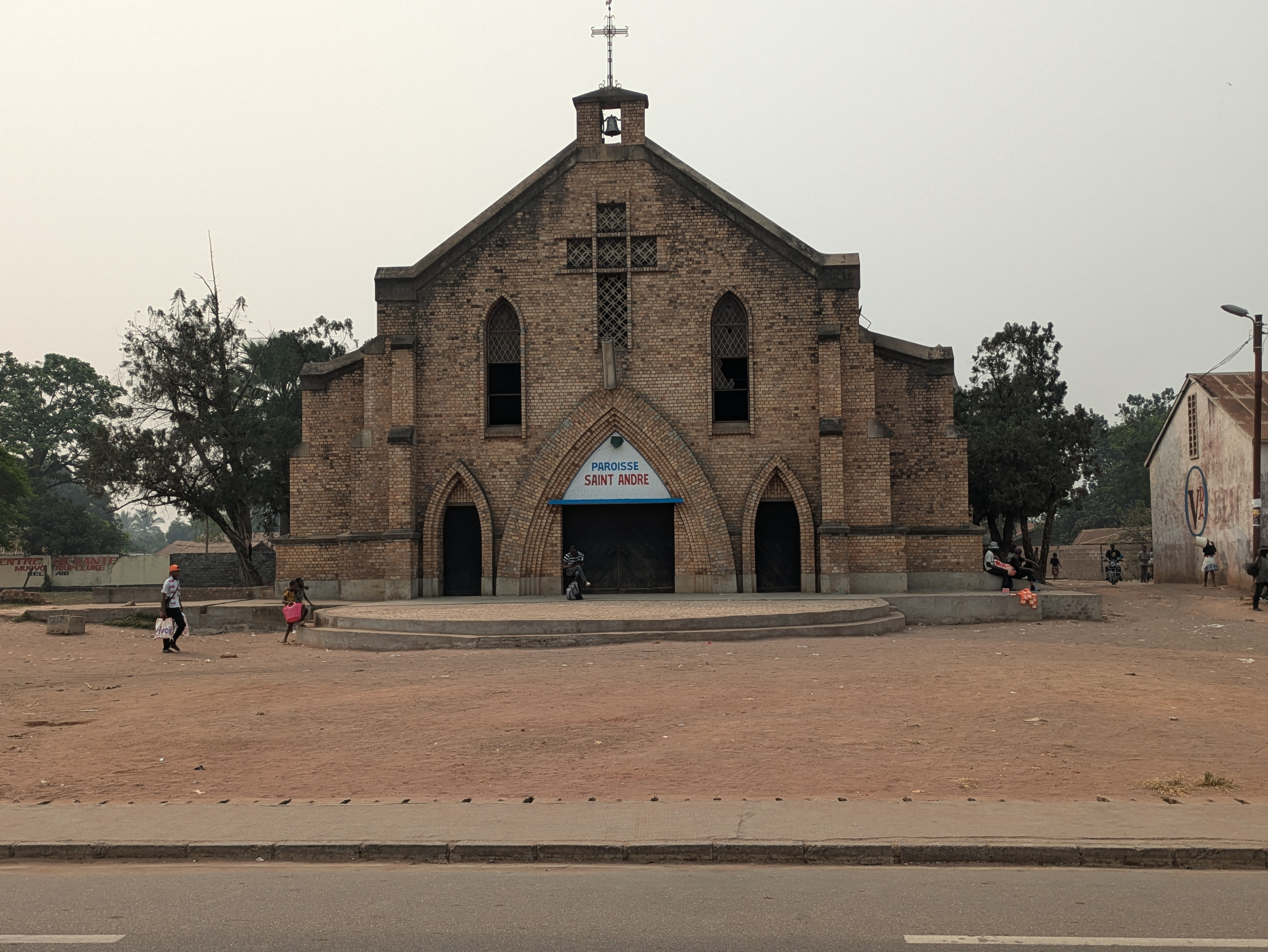
Saint Andre Church.

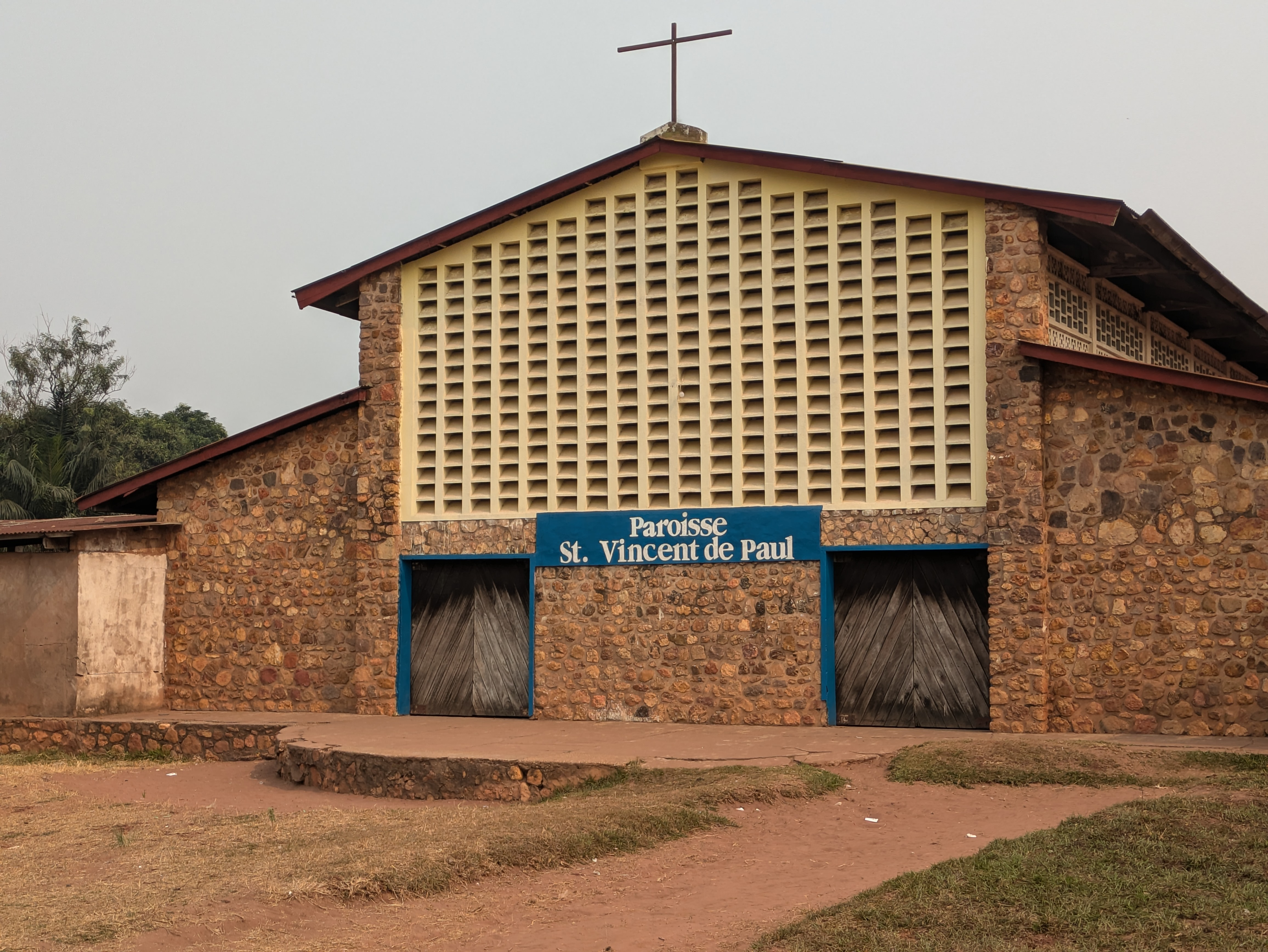
St Vincent de Paul Church.

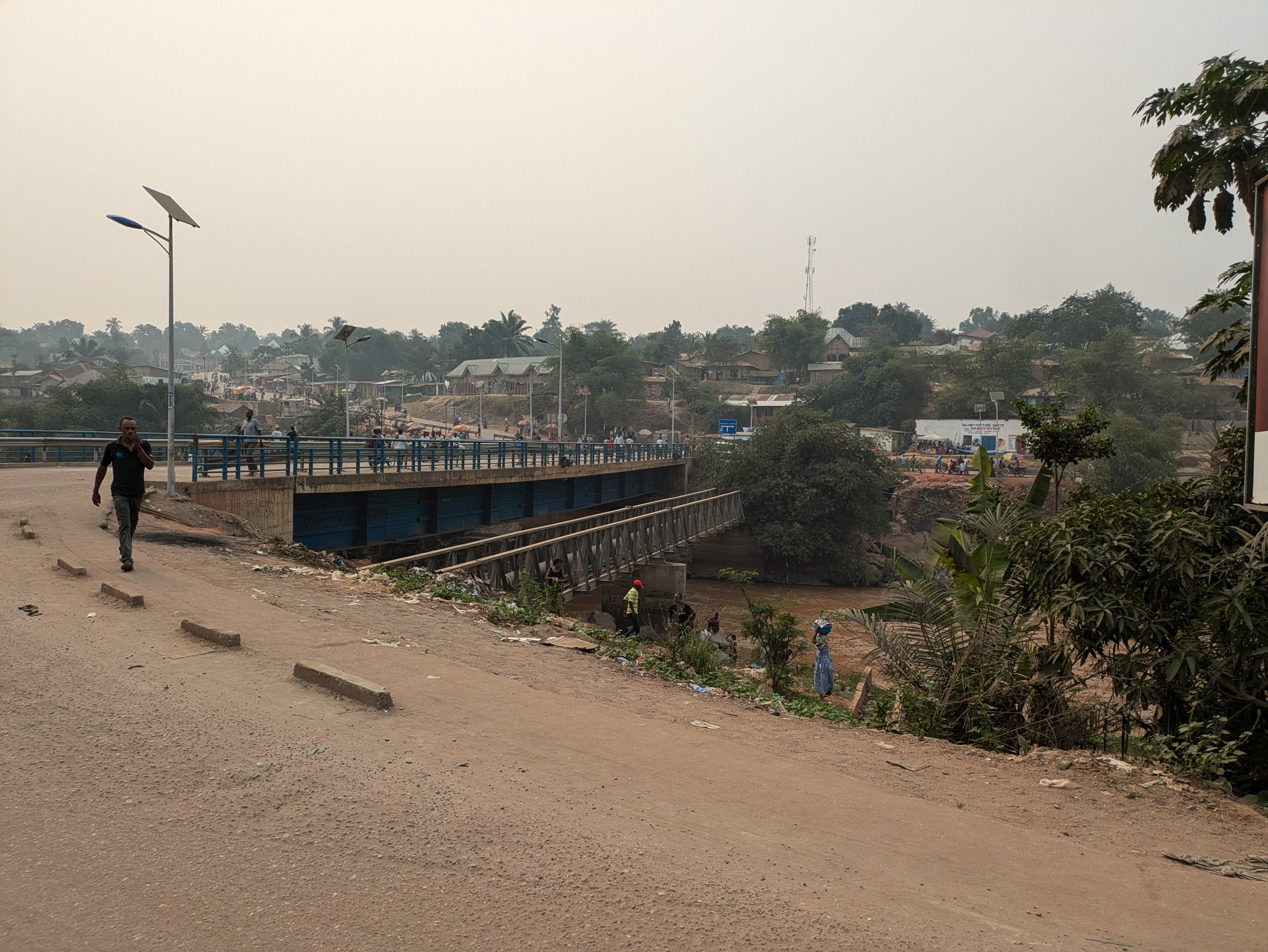
Bridge over a river in Tshikapa.
