= Mbumba (commune) =

Commune in the Democratic Republic of Congo

Mbumba is a commune of the city of Tshikapa in the Democratic Republic of the Congo.
