= Chokwe language =

Bantu language spoken by the Chokwe people

Chokwe
- Ucôkwe (Wuchokwe)
- Native to: Angola, Democratic Republic of the Congo, Zambia
- Ethnicity: Chokwe people
- Native speakers: (2.5 million cited 1990–2018)
- Language family: Niger–Congo?: Atlantic–Congo; Volta-Congo; Benue–Congo; Bantoid; Southern Bantoid; Bantu (Zone K); Chokwe–Luchazi (K.10); Chokwe

Official status
- Official language in: Angola (national language)
- Regulated by: Instituto de Línguas Nacionais

Language codes
- ISO 639-3: cjk
- Glottolog: chok1245
- Guthrie code: K.11

Chokwe
- Person: Kacôkwe
- People: Tucôkwe
- Language: Ucôkwe (Wuchokwe)

Chokwe (also known as Batshokwe, Ciokwe, Kioko, Kiokwe, Quioca, Quioco, Shioko, Tschiokloe or Tshokwe) is a Bantu language spoken by the Chokwe people of the Democratic Republic of the Congo, Angola and Zambia.

In Angola, it is the native language of more than 2 million people (as of 2024); another half a million speakers lived in the Congo in 1990, and some 20,000 in Zambia in 2010. It is used as a lingua franca in eastern Angola.

== Writing system ==
Angola's Instituto de Línguas Nacionais (National Languages Institute) has established spelling rules for Chokwe with a view to facilitate and promote its use.

== Phonology ==
=== Vowels ===
	Front	Central	Back
Close	i		u
Close-mid	e		o
Open-mid	ɛ		ɔ
Open		a ~ ɑ	

Vowels may also be heard as nasalized when preceding nasal consonants.

=== Consonants ===
		Labial	Alveolar	Post- alveolar	Palatal	Velar	Glottal
Stop	voiceless	p	t		(c)	k	
Stop	voiced	b	d		(ɟ)	g	
Stop	aspirated	pʰ	tʰ			kʰ	
Stop	prenasal vd.	ᵐb	ⁿd		(ᶮɟ)	ᵑɡ	
Stop	prenasal vl.	ᵐp					
Affricate	voiceless	p͡f	t͡f	t͡ʃ			
Affricate	voiced		t͡v	d͡ʒ			
Affricate	prenasal		ⁿd͡v	ⁿd͡ʒ			
Fricative	voiceless	f	s	ʃ			h
Fricative	voiced	v	z	ʒ			
Fricative	prenasal		ⁿz	ⁿʒ			
Nasal		m	n		ɲ		
Approximant	lateral		l		ʎ		
Approximant	plain				j	w	

Affricate sounds /t͡ʃ, d͡ʒ, ⁿd͡ʒ/ may also be pronounced as palatal stops [c, ɟ, ᶮɟ].

=== Tones ===
Chokwe has three tones as /V́/, /V̀/, and /V̂/.

== Examples ==
English	Chokwe
Good Morning -Response	Menekenu -Mwane
See you	Ndo shimbu yikehe
Goodbye	Salenuho
What is your name?	Jina lie yena iya?
My name is ____	Jina liami ___
