= Chokwe people =

Ethnic group of Central and Southern Africa

- Flag of the Chokwe and Lunda people.

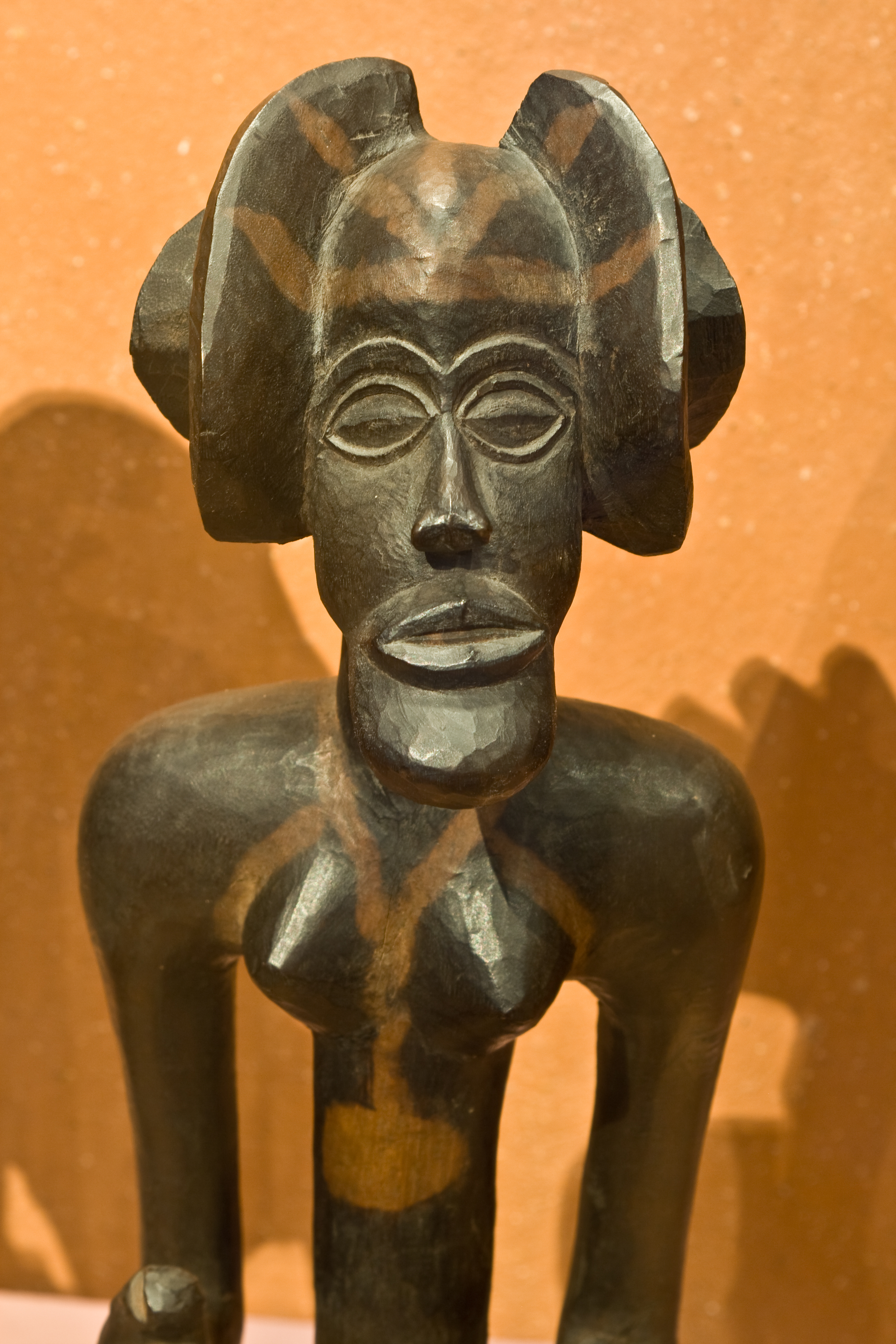
- Chokwe artwork

Total population
- 1.3 million

Regions with significant populations
- Angola, Congo DR, Zambia

Languages
- Chokwe; many also speak French, Portuguese or English

Religion
- Christian, Animist

Related ethnic groups
- Ambundu, Ovimbundu, Luba, Lunda, Lwena, Songo

The Chokwe people, known by many other names (including Kioko, Bajokwe, Chibokwe, Kibokwe, Ciokwe, Cokwe or Badjok), are a Bantu ethnic group of Central and Southern Africa. They are found primarily in Angola, southwestern parts of the Democratic Republic of the Congo (Kinshasa to Lualaba), and northwestern parts of Zambia.

There are two distinct seasons that occur in the Chokwe region: a rainy season between October and April, and a dry season for the remainder of the year. This weather had a huge impact on village life; the Chokwe farmed, hunted, fished, and built houses according to the changing of the seasons.

The Chokwe people have many different forms of artwork and many extant examples are kept in museums abroad.

== Demographics and language ==
Estimated to be about 1.3 million, their language is usually referred to as Chokwe (or Kichokwe, Tshokwe), a Bantu language in the Benue-Congo branch of Niger-Congo family of languages.

Many also speak the official languages of their countries: English in Zambia, French in Democratic Republic of Congo, and Portuguese (as first or second language) in Angola.

The Chokwe have many neighbors that consist of the Lunda, Pende, Mbangani, and Kete to the North; Minungu, Lwena, Luchazi, Mbwela, and Mbundato to the East; Holo, Mbundu, Imbangala, Songo, and Ovimbundu to the West; and the Kwanyama to the South. Many of these ethnic groups have historical links to the Chokwe as well as sharing many traditions and speaking similar languages.

== History ==
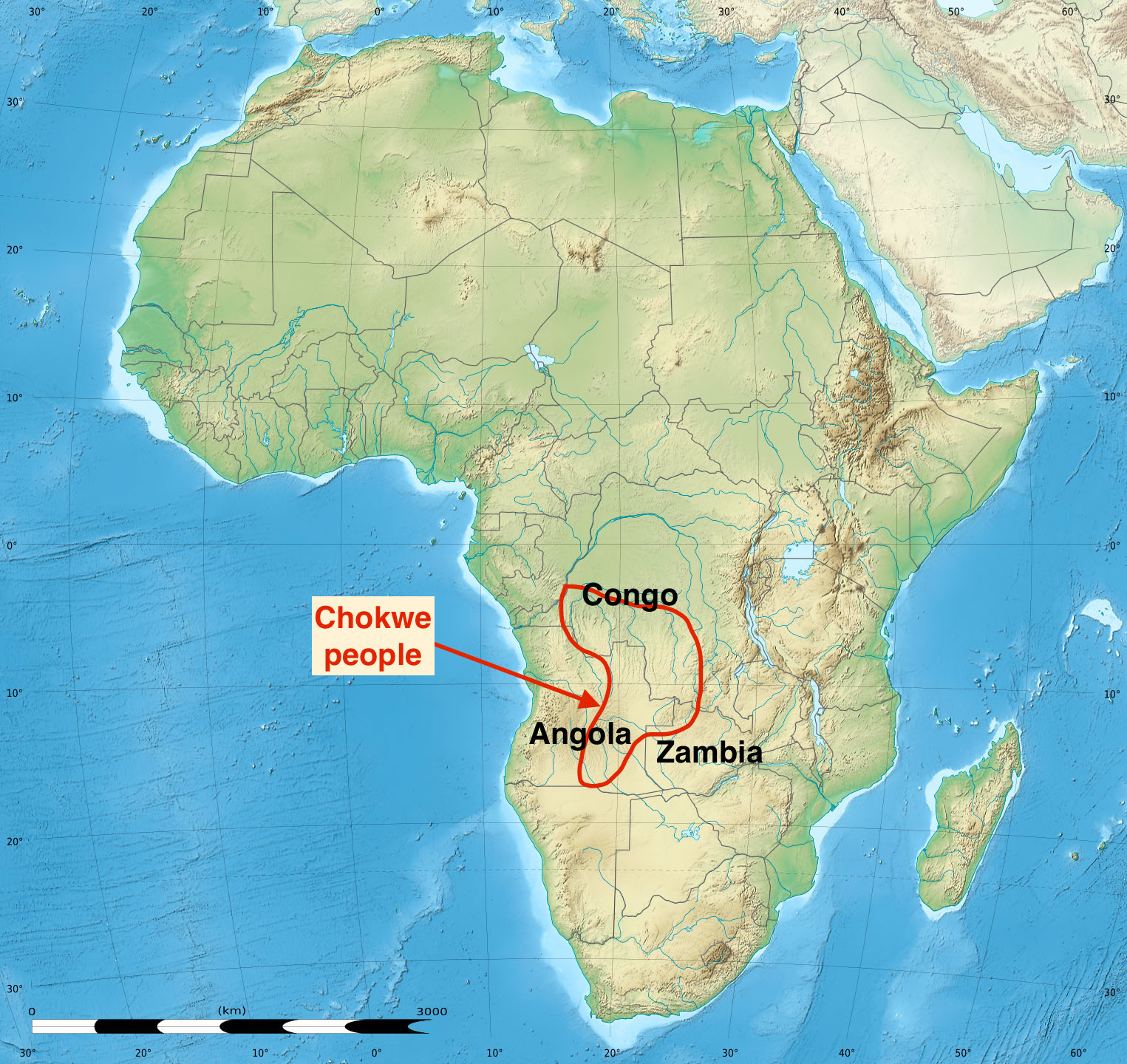
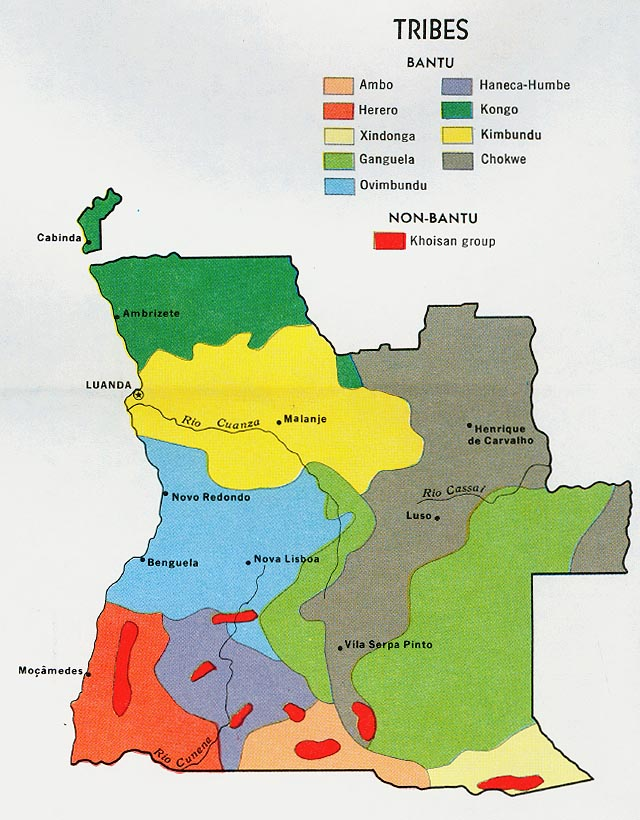
Left: Chokwe people distribution in Angola, Congo and Zambia (approx); Right: Angola ethnic groups map.

The Chokwe were once one of the twelve clans constituting the Lunda Empire in 17th- and 18th-century Angola. Initially employed by Lunda nobles, the tribe split off from the Lunda oligarchy following a series of civil disputes, including refusal to pay tributes to the sitting king. Their trading and resources brought them relative wealth in comparison with other neighboring tribes. By 1900, the Chokwe had overthrown the Lunda kingdom (also called the Mwata Yanvo) altogether. With this, the Chokwe language and sociopolitical influence began to dominate northeastern Angola and the other 11 tribes of the former Lunda kingdom. As the conflicts escalated during the colonial era of the 19th and 20th centuries, both from Europeans to the west and the Swahili-Arabs to the east, the Chokwe mounted a reactionary-military insurrection and expanded further into northern Angola, Congo, and West Zambia.

The Portuguese had virtually no contact with the Chokwe until the 1830s, when the Chokwe began trading wax, rubber and ivory. Eventually, the Portuguese brought an end to the dominance of the Chokwe in the regions of northern Angola, Congo, and Zambia. Reacting to this changing status quo, civil unrest amongst the Chokwe grew into violence; by 1961, a war broke out in Angola, which ultimately ended in 1975 when the Portuguese left the country. Although war between the Portuguese came to an end, civil wars between the many different communities of Angola lingered due to the resulting power vacuum. This ended in a peace agreement that did not end the fighting completely.

Chokwe, Lunda, Lwena/Luvale, Luchazi, Ovimbundu, and Mbunda chiefs all share common ancestry which can be traced back to the Lunda migrations in the sixteenth century.

=== Slavery ===
In the 18th and 19th centuries, the Chokwe found themselves divided between those who ended up as slaves, and those who bought and kept slaves of their own from within and abroad. The Lunda nobles of Angola employed the Chokwe as soldiers to counterattack the new colonial influence acting against the old political powers. Once the Chokwe people had weaponry, however, they overthrew the Lunda nobles and enslaved foreign tribesmen on their own plantations following the second half of the 19th-century and the early decades of the 20th. The slaves sourced from other ethnic groups of Africa became a prized possession sought by the Chokwe. In the upper Zambezi river and Kasai regions particularly, they were once a victim of well-armed Portuguese or Belgian raids from the West and Arab-Swahili raids from east (such as by Tippu Tip also known as Hamad bin Muhammad el Murjebi); later, the Chokwe people joined the violence and victimized others by capturing and shipping out a substantial number of captured slaves for financial gains, as well as purchasing and keeping slave women in their own homes for the profits of their craft work.

As the demand and financial returns of slave trade to the colonial markets grew, many slaves were captured or otherwise passed through the Chokwe controlled territory. They would allow the movement of slave men to continue west towards the ports in cooperation with the Portuguese, while women were often kept.This practice continued long after slavery was banned in Europe and the United States, as the demand for workers elsewhere such as in South America and the Caribbean continued; Swahili-Arabs, Omani, and other colonial plantation markets persist(ed), feeding an economy of smuggled slaves. European explorers who visited the Chokwe villages in early 20th-century reported that a majority of the women there were slaves in polygamous households and likely acted as a cause behind their population boom. In certain regions, the Chokwe people used slaves to raid their neighbors for exportable ivory stockpiles, as well as to counter the raids by militarized Arab-Swahili gangs seeking these ivory stockpiles and tribute payments.

== Society and culture ==
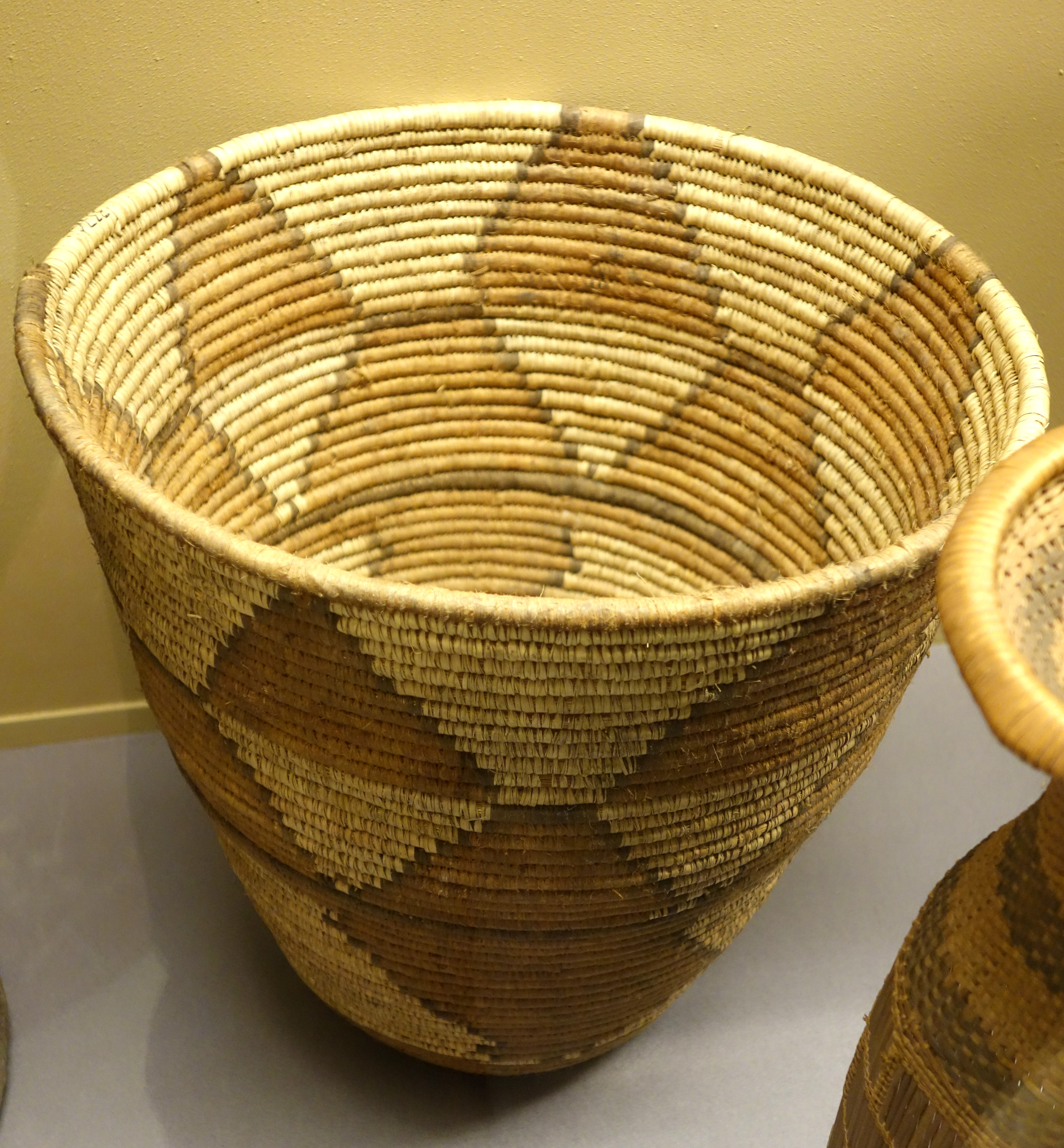
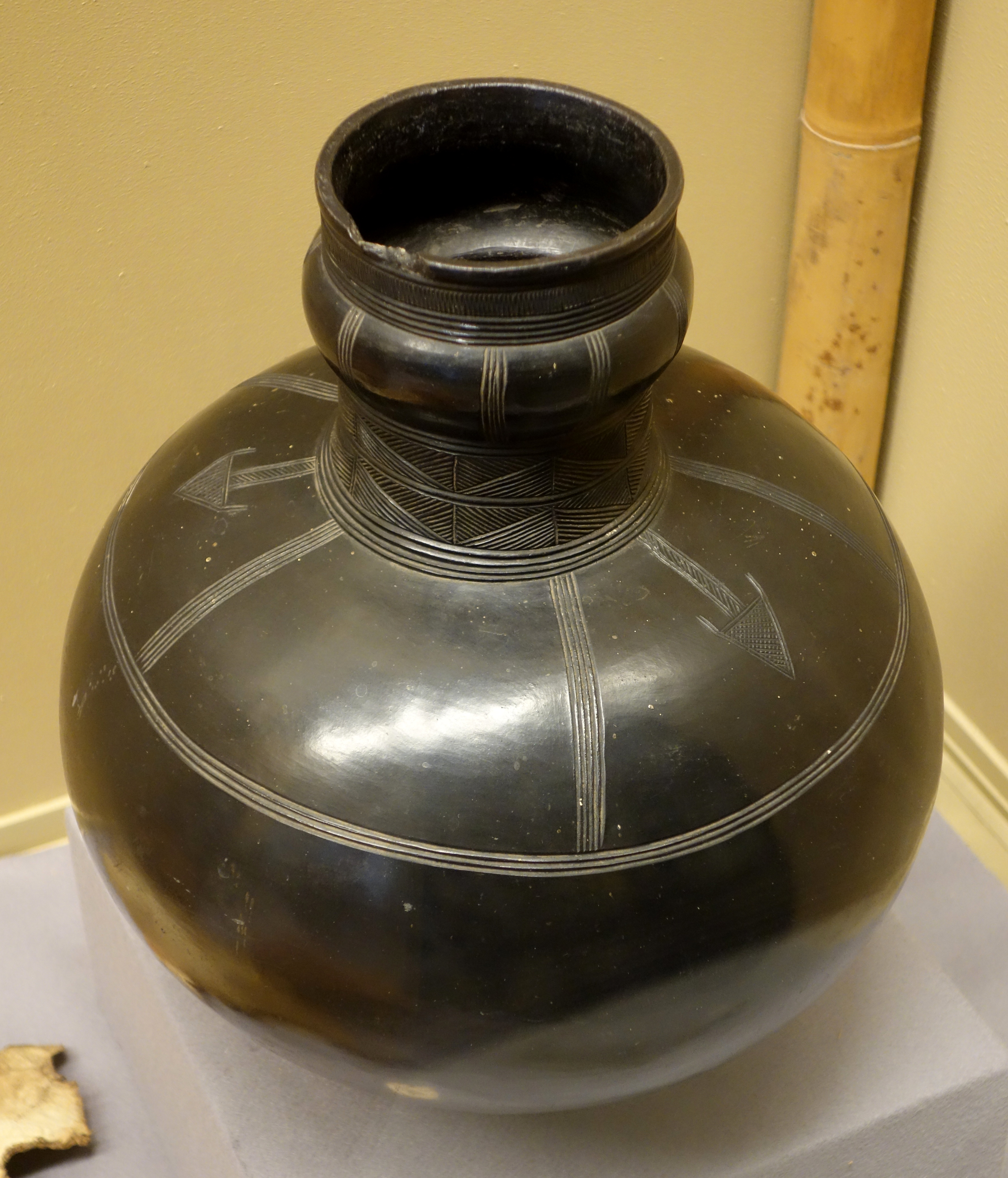
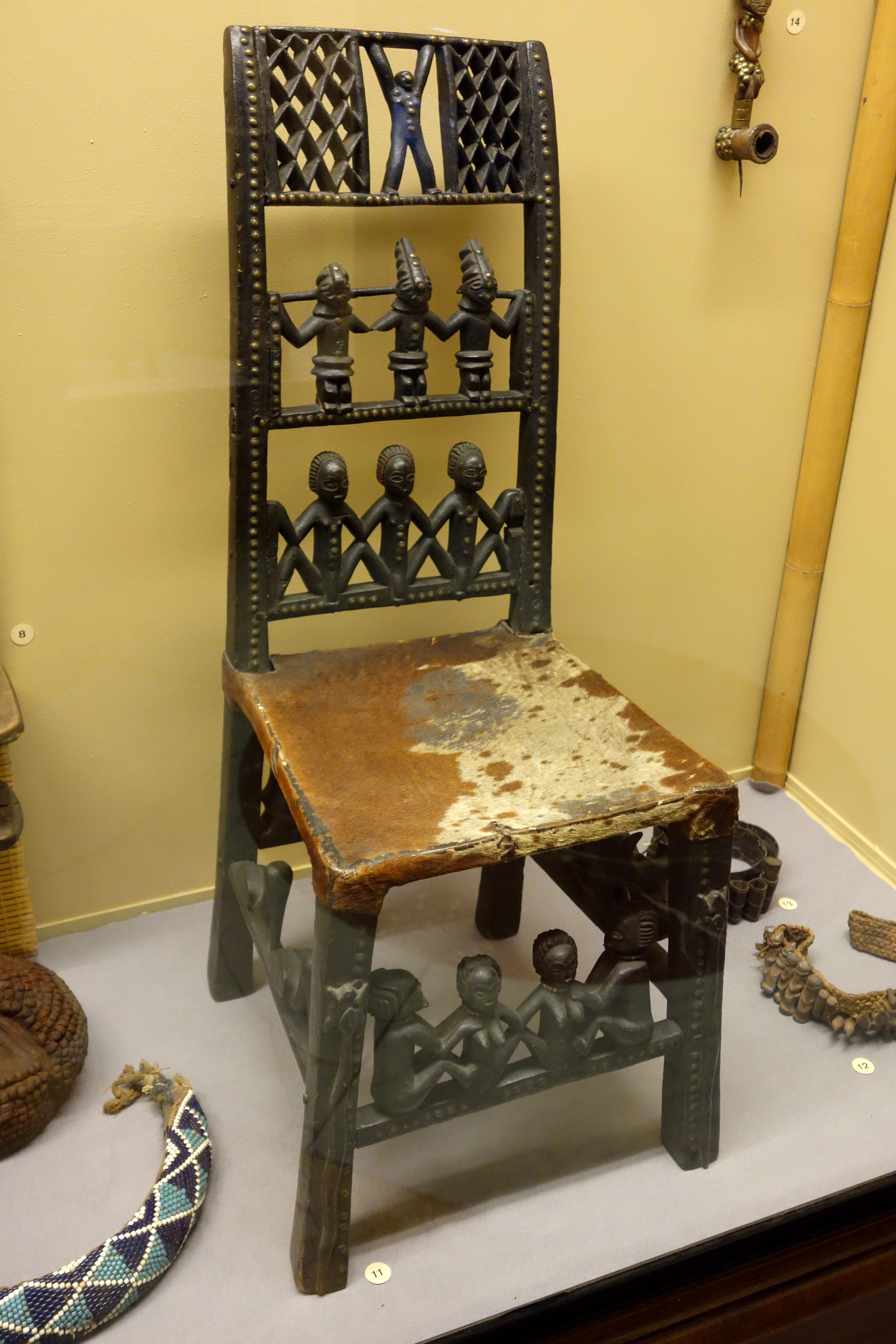
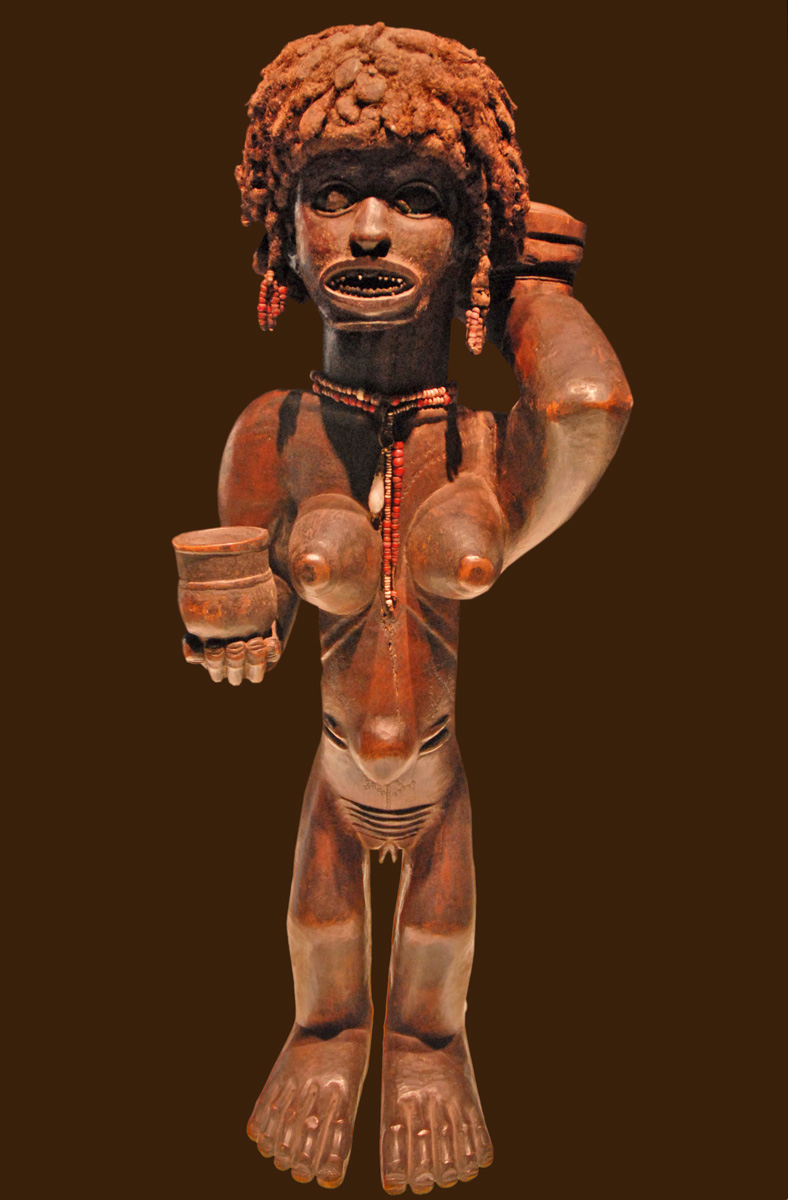
Examples of Chokwe crafts.

The Chokwe are regionally notable for their crafts work, including baskets, pottery, mask carvings, statues, stools, and other handicrafts.The artwork include utilitarian objects, but often integrates Chokwe mythologies, oral history, and spiritual beliefs. For example, the mythical-cultural hero Chibinda Ilunga who married a Lunda woman and took over power is an often-sculpted figure. The Cikungu art personifies the collective power of Chokwe's ancestors, while Mwana po figurines depict the guardians of fertility and procreation. The Ngombo figurines have been traditionally a part of divining spirits who are shaken to tell causes of illness, misfortune, infertility, and other problems faced by a family or a village.

The chiefdoms of the 18th- and 19th-century eventually began to decline due to smallpox and other diseases, which disrupted large regions of central Angola.

Both chiefs and village groups are found in the Chokwe culture. Villages consist of company compounds with square huts or circular grass-houses with a central space that serves as the meeting place for the villagers.

When it comes to village courts, most Chokwe territories have at least three types of legal organizations: the village courts, the chiefs' courts, and the district courts. Village courts consist of chiefly male elders that oversee cases involving land ownership, family quarrels, theft, and disputes in which witchcraft is suspected.

The Chokwe are traditionally a matrilineal society, but where the woman moves to live with her husband's family after wedding. Polygyny has been a historic practice usually limited to the chief or a wealthy family.

=== Village life ===
A Chokwe village is where relatives of the village headman, or chief, lives with their families. The Chokwe have their houses set up in a large circle with an open courtyard in the center. One of the most common features of a Chokwe village is the chota shelter. This shelter is cone-shaped made from freestanding wooden poles with a grass roof. The shelter is built in the center of the yard and is a place where visitors are received and where men meet. Some other structures that can be found within a Chokwe village are storage rooms and kitchens, which are both built right next to the houses.

The Chokwe houses are made from mud bricks that are sun-dried and can either be bought or made at home in wooden molds. Bunches of thick grass are used as the roof with extra layers of thinner grass placed on top.

Since the Chokwe farm, areas around the village are cleared at the beginning of the dry season where they will grow corn, cassava, and millet. Along with sweet potatoes, pumpkins, tomatoes, okra, and in certain areas, rice, beans, and peanuts. They also raise cattle, goats, pigs, and chickens, however, they only eat these animals on special occasions, such as wedding feasts.

=== Initiation camps ===
The Chokwe have separate initiation camps for the boys and for the girls. The males enter initiation camps at puberty; this process is called mukanda. An enclosure is built in a private place in the woods that is away from the village and this is where all the initiates will be circumcised. The initiates remain within the vicinity of the camp until the end of the initiation process where they will be under supervision of caretakers, or vilombola. This initiation may last for a couple of months to a year and initiates are not allowed to return to the village or approach women or members that are not initiated until they are graduated. Within the initiation process, elders will educate the initiates on Chokwe religion, sexuality, crafts, and tradition. Once they graduate, they are considered to be "reborn" into the Chokwe society.

The female initiation is called ukule. This encompasses the camp itself and the related events through which young women pass into adulthood. Women are initiated individually, unlike mukanda where they are initiated as a group, and require individual education that will prepare them for marriage shortly after the initiation ends. The camp is built on the outskirts of the village and consists of a cone-shaped grass hut, similar to the ones in the village, where the initiates sleep and spend their evenings. To prepare an initiate's body for birth, an elder scars her abdomen and lower back by cutting and flaring the skin and applying ashes into the wound. At the end, the initiate's body is painted with linear designs. She proceeds to walk in a procession through the village where she will perform dances that she learned during her initiation as well as receive gifts from relatives and neighbors.

== Sculptural forms ==
Over time, the Chokwe have come to develop cultural traditions that are reflected in the art that is created within the community. Many types of crafts such as masks honor and figuratively "contain" the spirits of the Chokwe ancestors.

When it comes to carvings on useful objects, the carvings are typically done by laymen. Chairs that are carved on commission by professional woodcarvers, songi, also produce cult objects, however, not every village has a professional woodcarver.

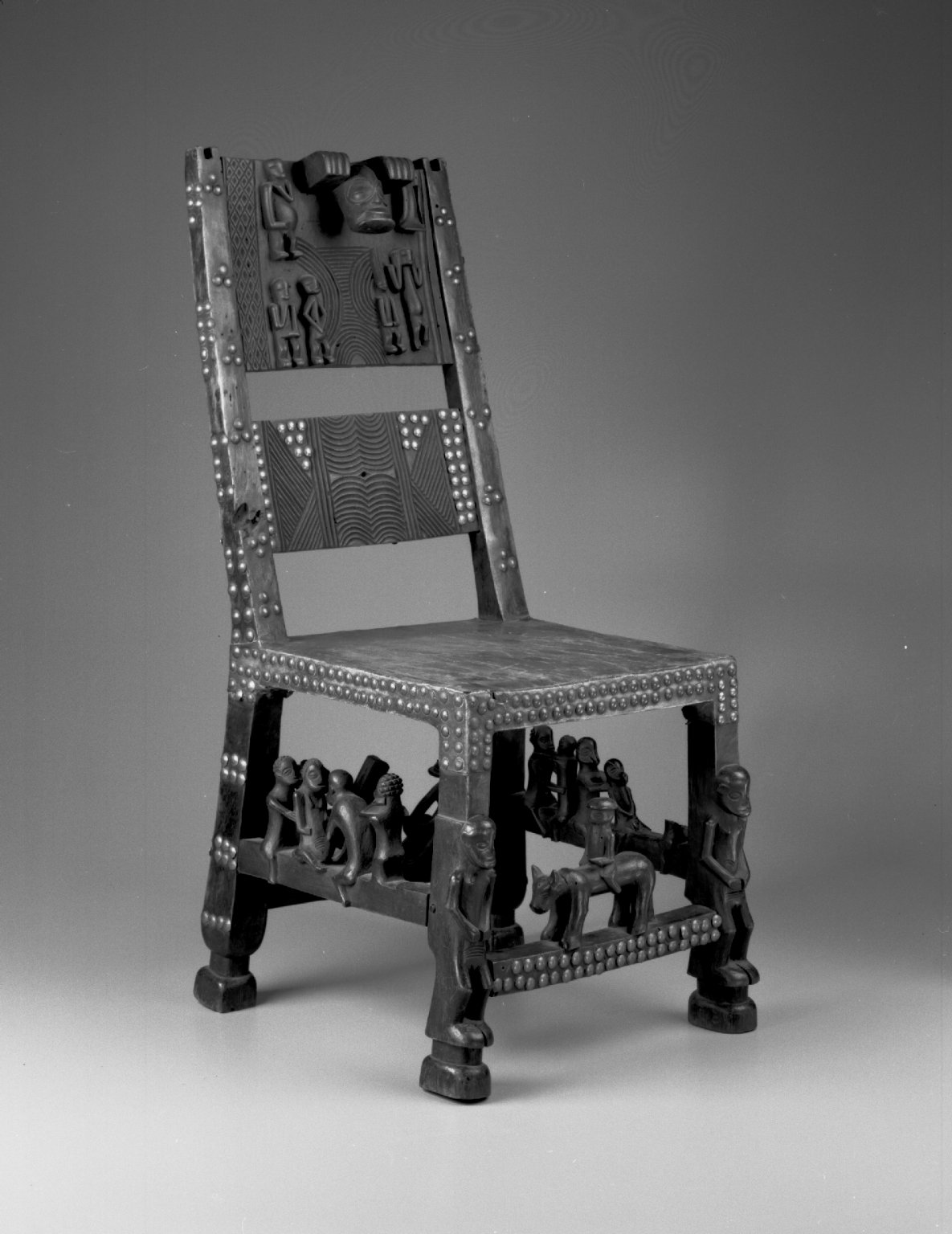
Chief's Chair

=== Royal arts ===
Many pieces that are used among the royal chiefs depict the chiefs themselves, as well as royal ancestors and female royal figures. There are many pieces depicting royalty, such as sculptural figures, stools, thrones, spears, scepters, staffs, pipes, snuff mortars (tobacco mortars), ceremonial axes, whistles, jewelry, combs, containers, and horns.

When the Chokwe use the term "throne", it is used to speak of carved chairs and joined square stools. This is because these Chokwe chairs and stools express power and prestige that their owners possess, the keepers of social order. The thrones alone, stand as symbols of order and power. When referring to a carved stool or chair that belongs to a chief, headman, or an important elder, it is referred to as ngunja, because it is to express respect for the influential rank of the owner on top of the messages that are behind the carvings.

=== Animal symbolism ===
The Chokwe incorporate images of animals within their artwork. Some images include birds, bats, rabbits, baboons, lions, aardvarks, and pangolins (anteaters), as well as domestic dogs and pigs. Furs, feathers, claws, beaks, and bones are used to decorate divination costumes.

A chief may be called a lion because it represents power and regal qualities that the chief wants to associate himself with. A chief may also associate himself with bats as symbols of authority, which suggest to the people that the chief can fly at night and be conscious of everything happening within his territory.

A diviner may keep the fur of genets (nocturnal cat-like animals of the civet family) which suggests that they have the ability to move at night as well as discover the hidden intentions of evildoers because a few features of the genet is that it is fast and a shy creature. People of the Chokwe community believe that the genet is able to vanish with invisibility so anyone who owns the fur of it can become invisible from others.

The Chokwe believes that dogs also are able to see things that are invisible to humans. When the people are asleep and the dogs howl, it is believed that they are warning their owners about invisible beings. Baboons are favored because they behave just like humans and have families. The Chokwe believe that the aardvark and scaly anteater are in contact with the ancestors of the underworld since these animals live underground. The Chokwe name for the pangolin is nkaka, which is the same word for grandfather.

=== Restitution ===
A recurring issue in foreign academic circles is the origins of various artworks contained museums abroad. Some efforts have been undertaken to return the artworks to the suspected source.

An example of this is the return of six objects to the National Museum of Dundo in northeastern Angola, where they were initially believed to have been lost. Overall, eleven objects have been identified as being part of the Dundo collection and have been successfully returned to Angola.

== Rituals ==
The Chokwe believed in many different spirits, including a hamba (s.) (pl. mahamba), which is a spirit of an ancestor or nature spirit for which a cult is dedicated to. When it comes to mahamba, the Chokwe represent them as trees, as pieces of termite mounds, as simplified figurines, and by masks. Prayers, sacrifices, and offerings are sent to these representations of these spirits in return for protection within everyday life and comfort them if any follower of the cult has angered them or there was a dispute that happened among the descendants.

There are two distinct mahamba that the Chokwe differentiate between. The mahamba makulwana, these are the spirits who represent the ancestors and who are represented by two termite mounds, and the mahamba yipwiya, which is the parasitic spirit, or a malevolent spirit, and can become attached to a person through possession. Sometimes, the parasitic spirit can be foreign and can be one of the most dangerous because they can cause illnesses and they are also one of the most difficult mahamba to please.

When an illness is caused by a mahamba, there can be a lengthy ritual process that can be performed in order to treat the victim of the illness. A cimbanda, which is a man, or a woman, who was exorcised from the same spirit and then became a member of the cult that is dedicated to that spirit. The cimbanda induces a possession to happen within the victim and will rub white clay over the body, which symbolizes innocence, as medicine to rid the spirit. This is only known to be successful when the victim lets out a final scream, believing to be the hamba leaving through the victim's mouth.

A purification ceremony is performed after the exorcism is executed by throwing everything that the victim has come into contact with into a bush or river, and the victim is then initiated into the cult.

=== Ritual masks ===
Most of the masks are painted in three basic colors, black, red, and white, and are typically made from vegetable fibers and pieces of cloth and paper.

When it comes to wearing a Chokwe ritual mask, there are certain qualifications that must be met beforehand.

Chokwe masqueraders have a belief that by spitting into the ritual mask that they are about to put on, it is considered a purification, an offering, and also a way of presenting a request to the ancestorial spirit. Another reason for the spitting is that it is also said to gain the trust of the spirits protection against any evil possessions as well as eliminate them.

The Chokwe have many masks surrounding rituals. There are three categories of ritual masks that the Chokwe distinguish between; the cikungu or makishi wa mwanangana mask, which represents the chief's ancestors and is only brought out on special occasions, the makishi a ku mukanda, this mask plays a role in the mukanda initiation, and the makishi a kuhangana, which is a dance mask and is primarily kept and performed by the owners.

The makishi wa Cikunza is a mask that is associated with the mukanda circumcision ritual and is referenced as a grasshopper which is known for its procreative powers therefore symbolizing fertility. The headdress of this mask and all its material and decorations represent the horns of an antelope, which symbolize power and virility. In one hand of the masquerader, he carries a mukwale sword or a rifle and in the other hand, he carries a citete branch and the job of the mask is to seek out those who need to be circumcised and lead them to the bush where the circumcision ritual will occur as well as protect the circumcised boys during the ritual.

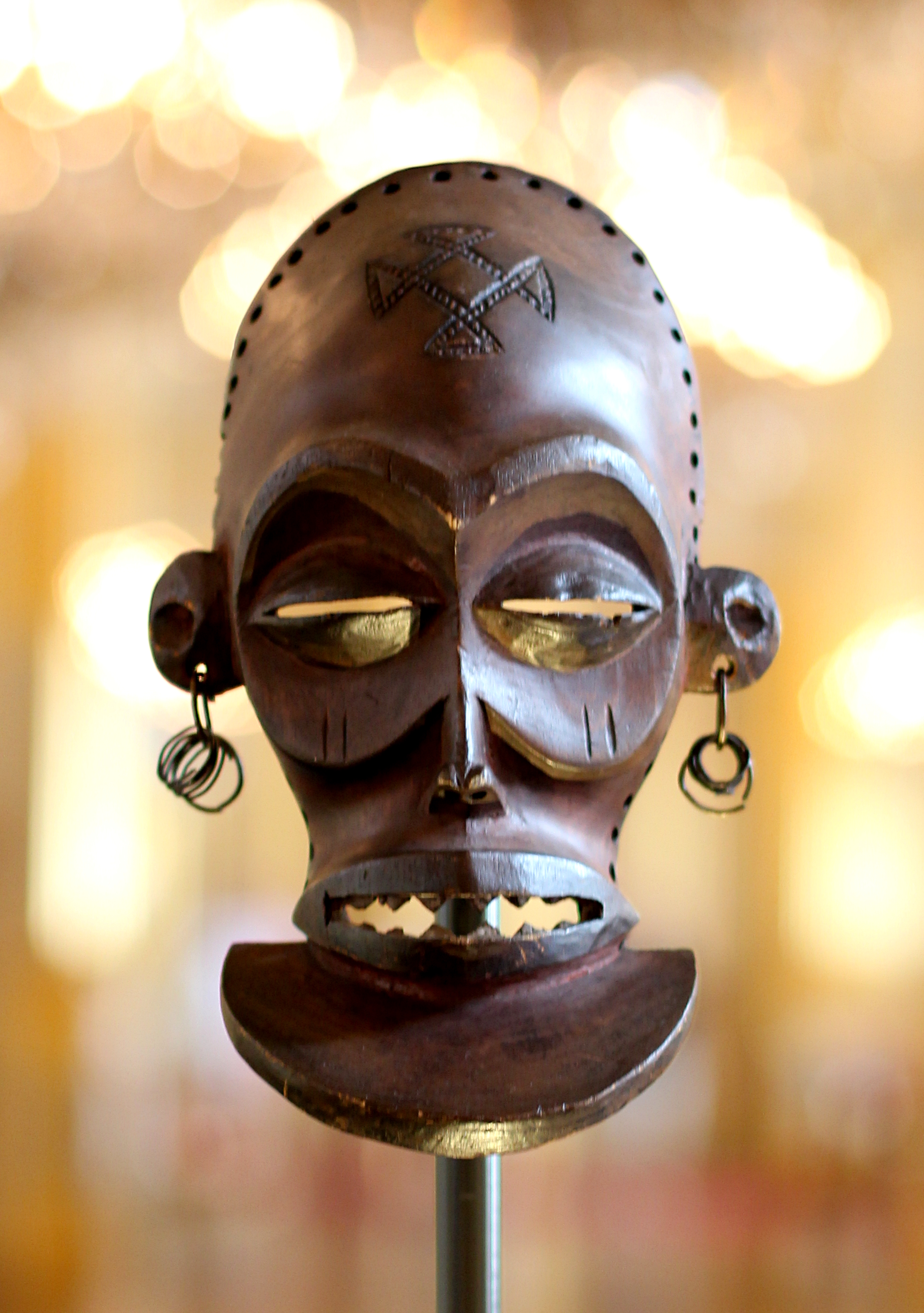
Cihongo Ritual Mask

The makishi wa Cikungu mask is the largest Chokwe mask and belongs to the mwanangana and resembles the chief's ancestors. The owner of this mask, the mwanangana, will make sacrifices of a goat or rooster with the mukwale sword and once the goat or rooster is sacrificed, it is then hung around a pole of the hut that is in the center of the village.

Since this mask is the largest out of them all, it has wings at its side that are said to represent the black stork (khumbi), and the sawtooth pattern that decorates the mask is associated with "the viper of the stork" The makishi wa Cikungu mask has a band of triangles that decorates the mask, which is called yenge, representing the Gaboon viper and its triangular designs on its back. When it comes to masquerades, the masquerader is always the owner and will wear the chiefs floor-length skirt and will also carry the sword or a rifle, similar to the makishi wa Cikunza masquerader.

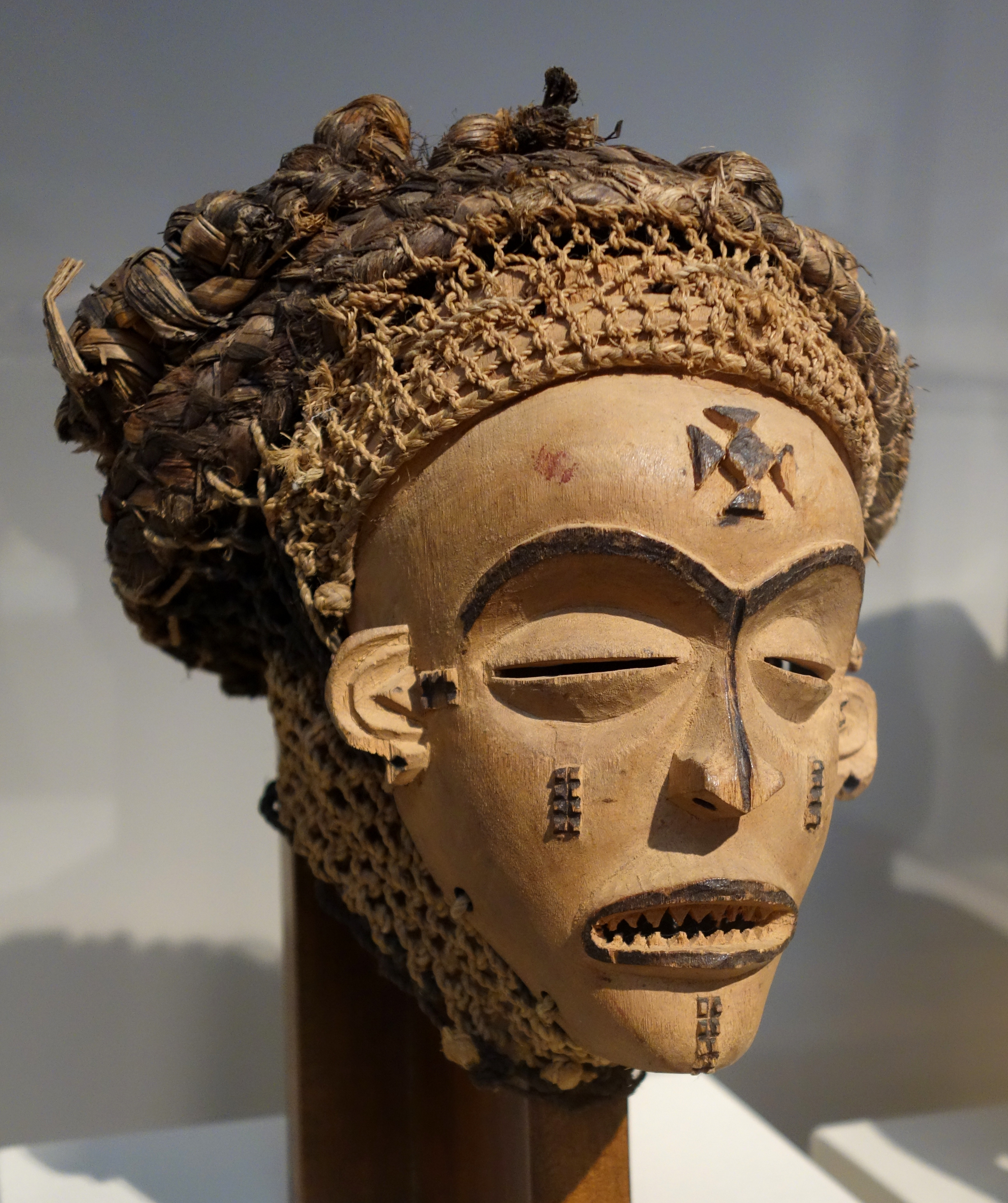
Pwo Dance Mask

The Cihongo mask, originally called Cimyanji, is a dance mask, and it is a very well-known mask among the Chokwe community. This mask represents the spirit of the wealthy and is worn by the chief, his son, and his nephew. It is believed that back in ancient times, this mask was used as a tool for justice and could accuse spectators of crimes that were ultimately punishable by death. Similar to the Cinkunza, this mask is a hamba and can also be a makishi as well and can cause infertility in women, sickness in men, or unsuccessful hunting if it is displeased.

The last ritual mask that the Chokwe use is the Pwo (woman) or Mwana Pwo (girl) mask, which closely resemble portraits, and it is a mask that is hamba by nature and is only for its owner. This mask is primarily used to represent a mature woman who has proven her fertility by having a child, however, it may also represent a girl and the hope of having an offspring. This mask is performed by a male masquerader who grants fertility to the spectators during his performance of the mask. Once the dancer of the mask passes, these masks are also buried as if they were a person.

=== Religion ===
The traditional religious beliefs of the Chokwe center around ancestor spirits worship. In groups where chiefs exist, they are considered the representative of god Kalunga or Nzambi, therefore revered and called Mwanangana or "overseer of the land." There is sometimes perceived to be a spiritual connection between works of arts such as handicrafts and carved objects and ancestors, as well as god Kalunga or Nzambi. With the colonial era, Chokwe converted to Christianity en masse yet the original beliefs were retained to produce a syncretism of beliefs and practices. They have, for example, continued their spirit-rituals from pre-Christian era, as well maintained their elaborate rites-of-passage ceremonies particularly to mark the entry into adulthood by men and women.

The Chokwe build ancestral shrines where they place sculptures, objects, and artifacts. These objects that are placed within the ancestral shrines are meant to contain or represent the spirits as well as serve as a point of contact between the living and the spiritual forces. These shrines, called kachipango, the Chokwe will invoke, or call, their ancestral spirits.

== In popular culture ==
A Chokwe statue, Chokwe body carvings, blood diamonds, and the Chokwe people figure into the plotline of Donna Leon's 14th Commissario Guido Brunetti mystery novel, Blood From a Stone (2005).

Chokwe Lumumba, the former Republic of New Afrika leader who became mayor of Jackson, Mississippi in 2013, adopted his first name from the Chokwe people. His son, Chokwe Antar Lumumba, was elected mayor of Jackson in 2017.

== See also ==
- Chikunga
