= Kasaï Province =

Province of the Democratic Republic of the Congo

Kasaï Province du Kasaï (French)
- Province
- Province du Kasaï
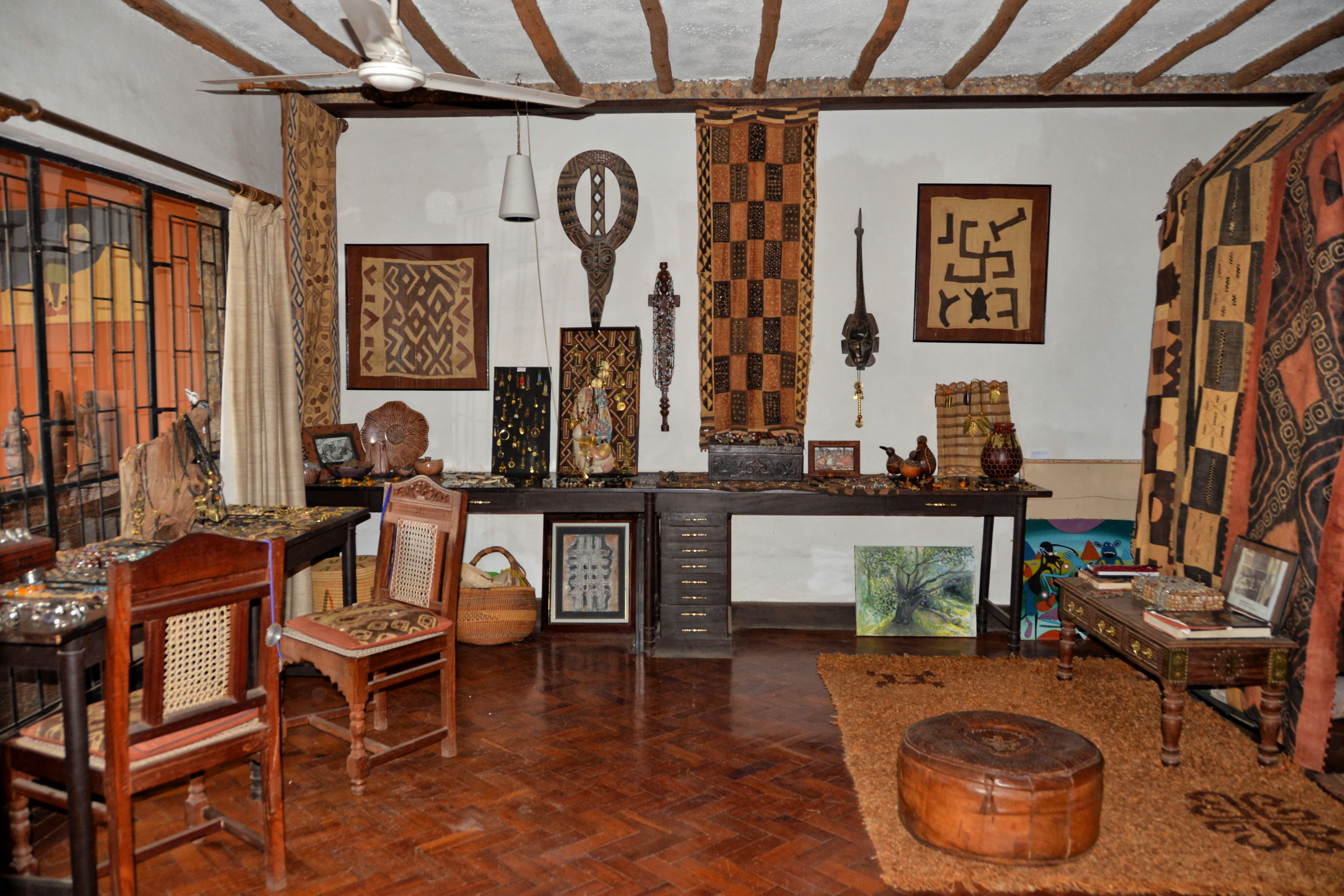
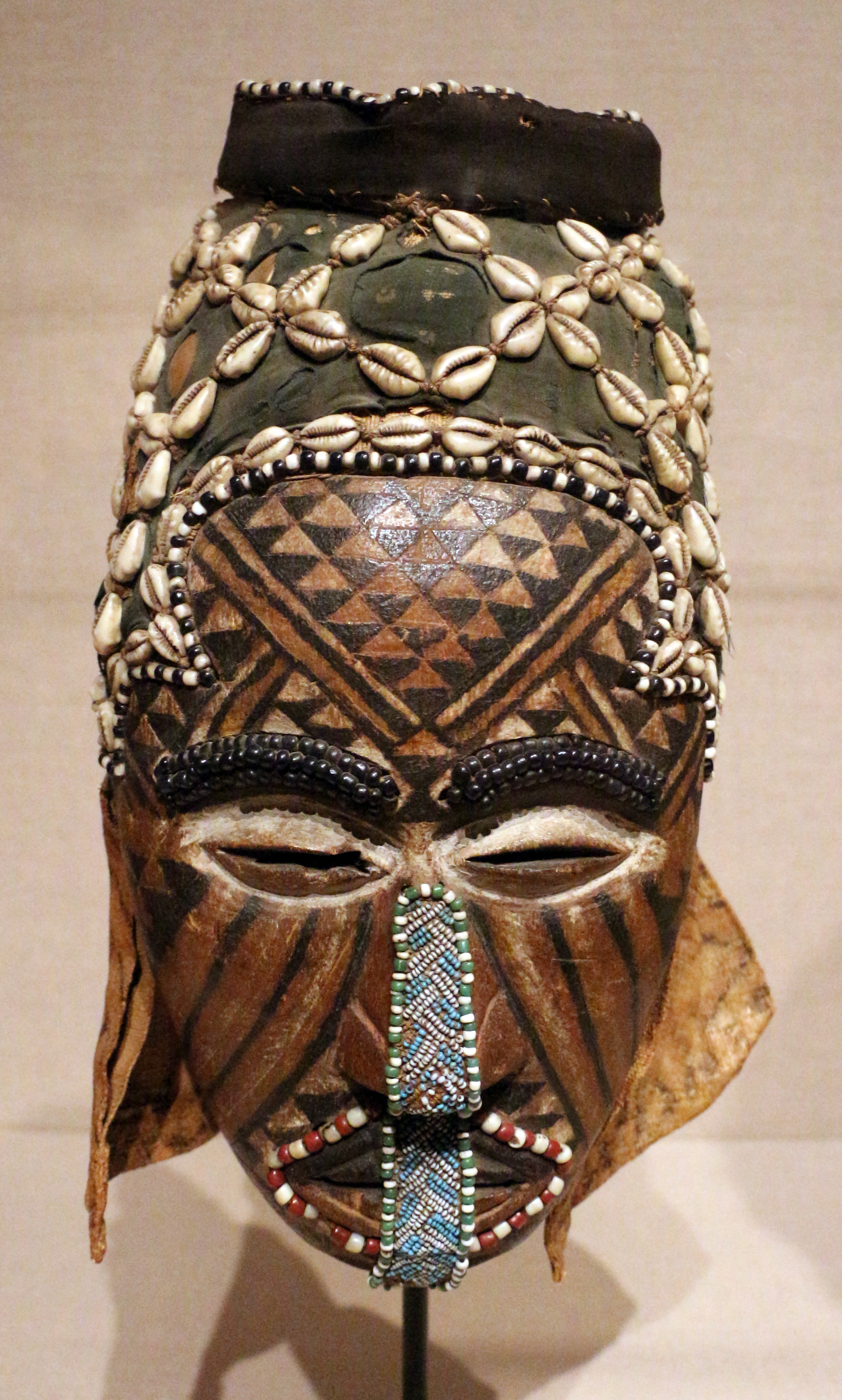
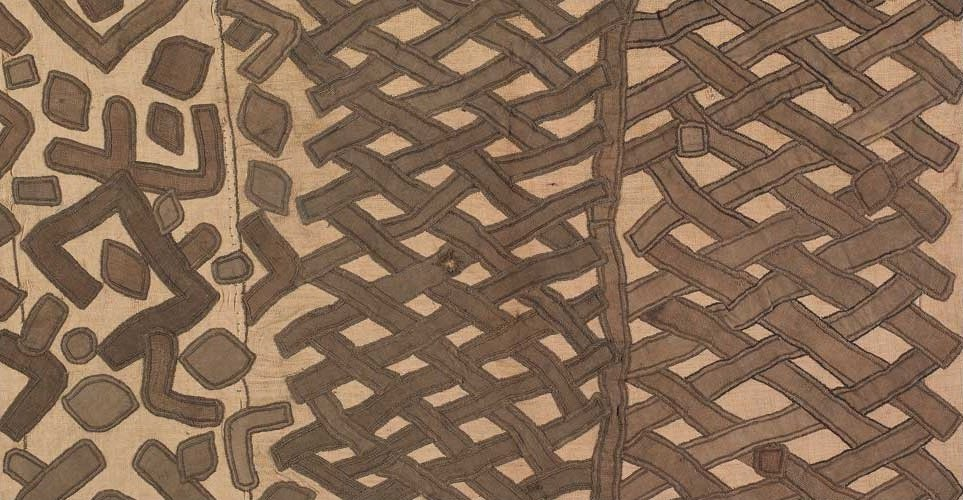
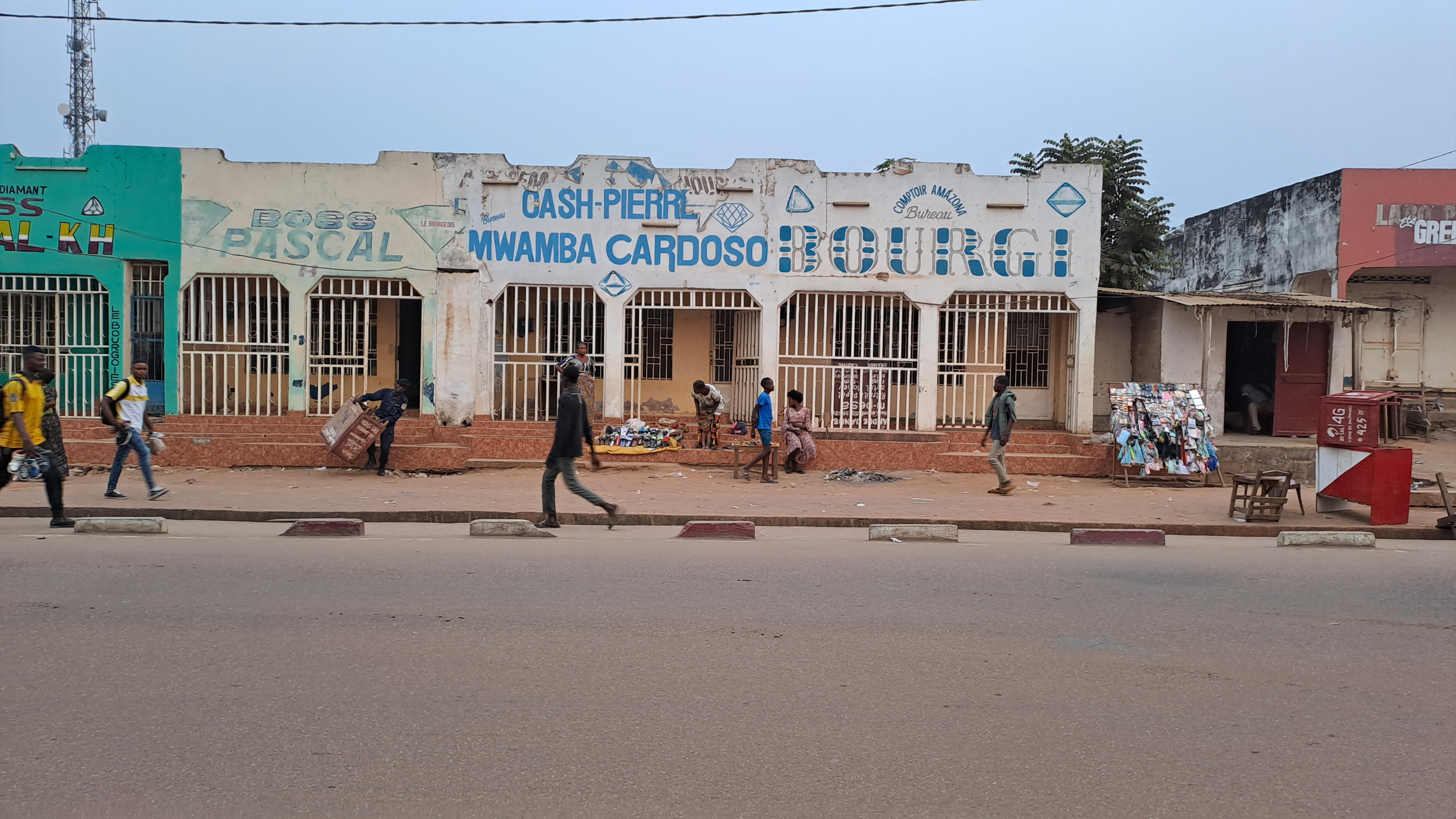
- Top-left, Top-right and Bottom-left: Bakuba artifacts originating from the Mweka Territory • Bottom-right: Provincial Capital Tshikapa

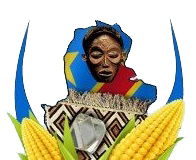
- Seal

- Coordinates: 5°21′S 21°25′E
- Country: Democratic Republic of the Congo
- Created: 2015
- Named after: Kasai River
- Capital: Tshikapa

Government
  - Governor: Crispin Mukendi

Area
  - Total: 95,631 km^{2} (36,923 sq mi)
  - Rank: 12th

Population (2024 est.)
  - Total: 3,686,000
  - Density: 38.54/km^{2} (99.83/sq mi)

Ethnic groups
  - Native: Bakuba • Anamongo • Bashilele • Bapende • Bakete • Bena-Lulua • Chokwe • Balwalwa • Luba-Kasaï (Baluba) • Batwa • Badengese • Bawongo • Basongomeno
- Time zone: UTC+2 (Central Africa Time)
- License Plate Code: (Democratic Republic of the Congo) CGO / 08
- Official language: French
- Regional language: Tshiluba
- Website: www.kasai.cd

Kasaï is one of the 21 provinces of the Democratic Republic of the Congo created in the 2015 repartitioning. Kasaï and Kasaï-Central provinces are the result of the partitioning of the former Kasaï-Occidental province. Kasaï was formed from the Kasaï district and the independently administered city of Tshikapa which became the capital of the new province.

== Administration ==
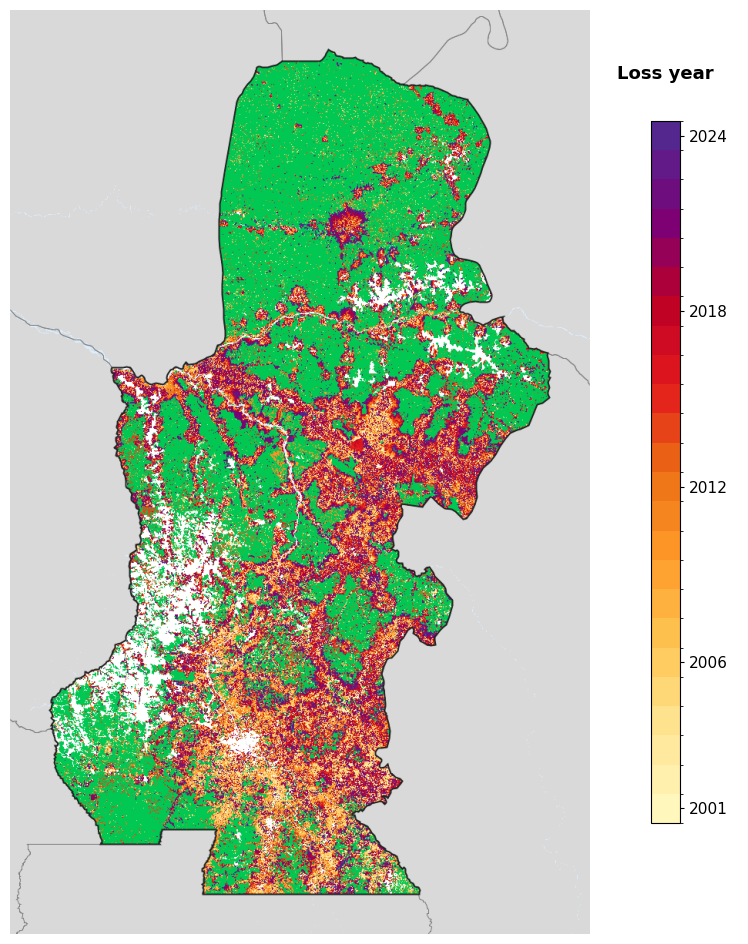
Tree-cover loss year in Kasaï, 2001-2024, from the Global Forest Change dataset.

Kasaï is divided in to five territories and one independently administered city.

Administrative division	Type	Map
Tshikapa	City	Tshikapa
Dekese	Territory	Dekese
Ilebo	Territory	Ilebo
Kamonia	Territory	Kamonia
Luebo	Territory	Luebo
Mweka	Territory	Mweka

== See also ==
- Kasai region
- Kamwina Nsapu rebellion
