= Régie des Voies Aériennes de la République Démocratique du Congo =

Régie des Voies Aériennes
- Predecessor: Service d'Aéronautique Civile (SAC)
- Formation: 21 February 1972; 54 years ago
- Founder: Government of the Democratic Republic of the Congo
- Founded at: Barumbu
- Legal status: State-owned commercial enterprise
- Purpose: Management and regulation of civil aviation infrastructure and air navigation services in the Democratic Republic of the Congo
- Headquarters: Barumbu, Kinshasa, Democratic Republic of the Congo
- Official language: French
- Director General: Louis-Blaise Londolé

The Air Transport Authority of the Democratic Republic of the Congo (French: Régie des Voies Aériennes de la République Démocratique du Congo, abbreviated as RVA) is a state-owned enterprise responsible for managing, operating, and controlling the country's civil aviation infrastructure and airspace. Technically placed under the responsibility of the Ministry of Transport, Communications and Rural Development and administratively under the Ministry of Portfolio, the RVA oversees airport operations, air navigation services, and the maintenance of aeronautical facilities across the national territory.

The RVA was officially founded through Law No. 72-013 of 21 February 1972, following earlier legislative frameworks, such as Law No. 78-002 of 6 January 1978 and Ordinance No. 78-200 of 5 May 1978, which outlined general corporate and regulatory provisions. Since Decree No. 09/11/2009 of 24 April 2009, issued to guide the transformation of public enterprises, the RVA has operated as a commercial entity with legal status and financial independence. Its headquarters are located near N'Dolo Airport, at the intersection of Avenue Kabasele Tshiamala in Barumbu, Kinshasa. As part of its operational mandate, the RVA manages a nationwide network of 54 airports.

== Mission ==
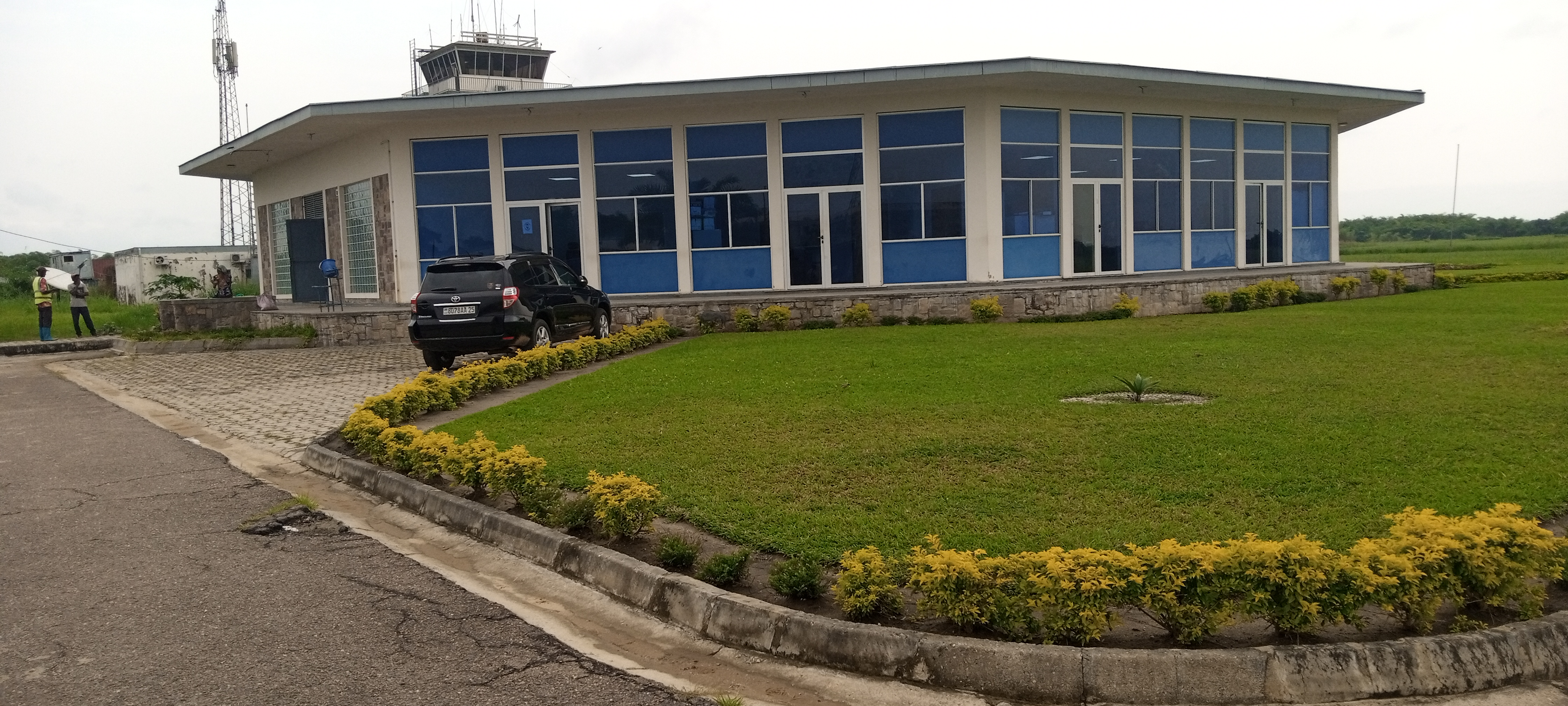
Administrative building of the RVA in Kisangani

The RVA is mandated to coordinate and oversee air navigation operations in a manner that minimizes the risk of aircraft collisions and air accidents, particularly on airport tarmacs. It is also responsible for imposing and collecting aeronautical and non-aeronautical charges. Part of its broader mission is to safeguard not only passengers but also aircraft while on the ground.

The RVA is also entrusted with the administration and rehabilitation of airport infrastructure and contributes to national security by managing key access points into and out of the country. Its core responsibilities include the management of 54 airports and airfields under its jurisdiction; the design, construction, upgrading, and maintenance of these aviation facilities; and the guarantee of safe air navigation using control towers, technical navigation aids, trained personnel, and adequate infrastructure such as runways, terminals, and tarmacs. The RVA also collects navigation-related fees from airlines as authorized by Ordinance No. 78-078 dated 24 January 1976, and provides training programs for civil aviation professionals.

The 54 airports and aerodromes managed by the RVA:

No.	Airport	Runway dimensions (m)	Elevation (m)
1.	N'djili International Airport	3,300 × 60 (after displacement of runway 24 threshold by 1,400 m)	310
2.	Lubumbashi International Airport	240 × 50 (after displacement of runway 07 threshold by 800 m)	1,308
3.	Kisangani Bangoka International Airport	3,500 × 45	432
4.	Goma International Airport	2,000 × 45	1,538
5.	Gbadolite Airport	3,200 × 65	460
6.	Mbuji-Mayi Airport	2,000 × 45	677
7.	Mbandaka Airport	2,200 × 45	319
8.	Kananga Airport	2,800 × 45	653
9.	N'Dolo Airport	1,300 × 30	290
10.	Kalemie Airport	1,750 × 30	778
11.	Kolwezi International Airport	1,750 × 30	1,526
12.	Kavumu Airport	2,000 × 45	1,724
13.	Lodja Airport	1,620 × 30	502
14.	Gemena Airport	2,200 × 45	420
15.	Matari Airport	2,500 × 45	743
16.	Kindu Airport	2,200 × 45	496
17.	Bandundu Airport	1,450 × 45	324
18.	Kikwit Airport	1,750 × 45	479
19.	Simisini Air Base	2,200 × 45	393
20.	Muanda Airport	1,480 × 45	27
21.	Matadi Tshimpi Airport	1,580 × 30	340
22.	Boma Airport	1,100 × 20	8
23.	Bunia Airport	1,850 × 30	1,254
24.	Tshikapa Airport	1,600 × 45	486
25.	Bumba Airport	1,600 × 45	361
26.	Lisala Airport	2,200 × 50	460
27.	Kamina Airport	1,450 × 20	1,120
28.	Kongolo Airport	1,900 × 20	564
29.	Libenge Airport	2,100 × 50	343
30.	Kabalo Airport	1,450 × 50	561
31.	Kinkungwa Airport	1,190 × 30	541
32.	Lusambo Airport	1,100 × 50	429
33.	Manono Airport	1,400 × 50	633
34.	Buta Zega Airport	2,100 × 30	420
35.	Abumumbazi Airport	1,200 × 30	457
36.	Ikela Airport	1,100 × 30	391
37.	Tembo Airport	1,100 × 60	645
38.	Kahemba Airport	900 × 30	1,044
39.	Inongo Airport	1,380 × 40	317
40.	Kenge Airport	900 × 30	551
41.	Beni Airport	1,300 × 30	1,072
42.	Tshumbe Airport	1,300 × 20	±350
43.	Punia Airport	1,140 × 30	531
44.	Ilebo Airport	1,250 × 32	442
45.	Nioki Airport	1,430 × 40	318
46.	Cabinda Airport	1,500 × 30	843
47.	Lubudi Airport	1,200 × 20	1,384
48.	Basango Mboliasa Airport	1,450 × 30	310
49.	Basankusu Airport	1,450 × 50	371
50.	Boende Airport	1,400 × 30	356
51.	Butembo Airport	800 × 30	—
52.	Rutshuru Airport	900 × 23	1,140
53.	Shabunda Airport	1,000 × 40	—
54.	Kasongo Airport	970 × 40	—

== History ==
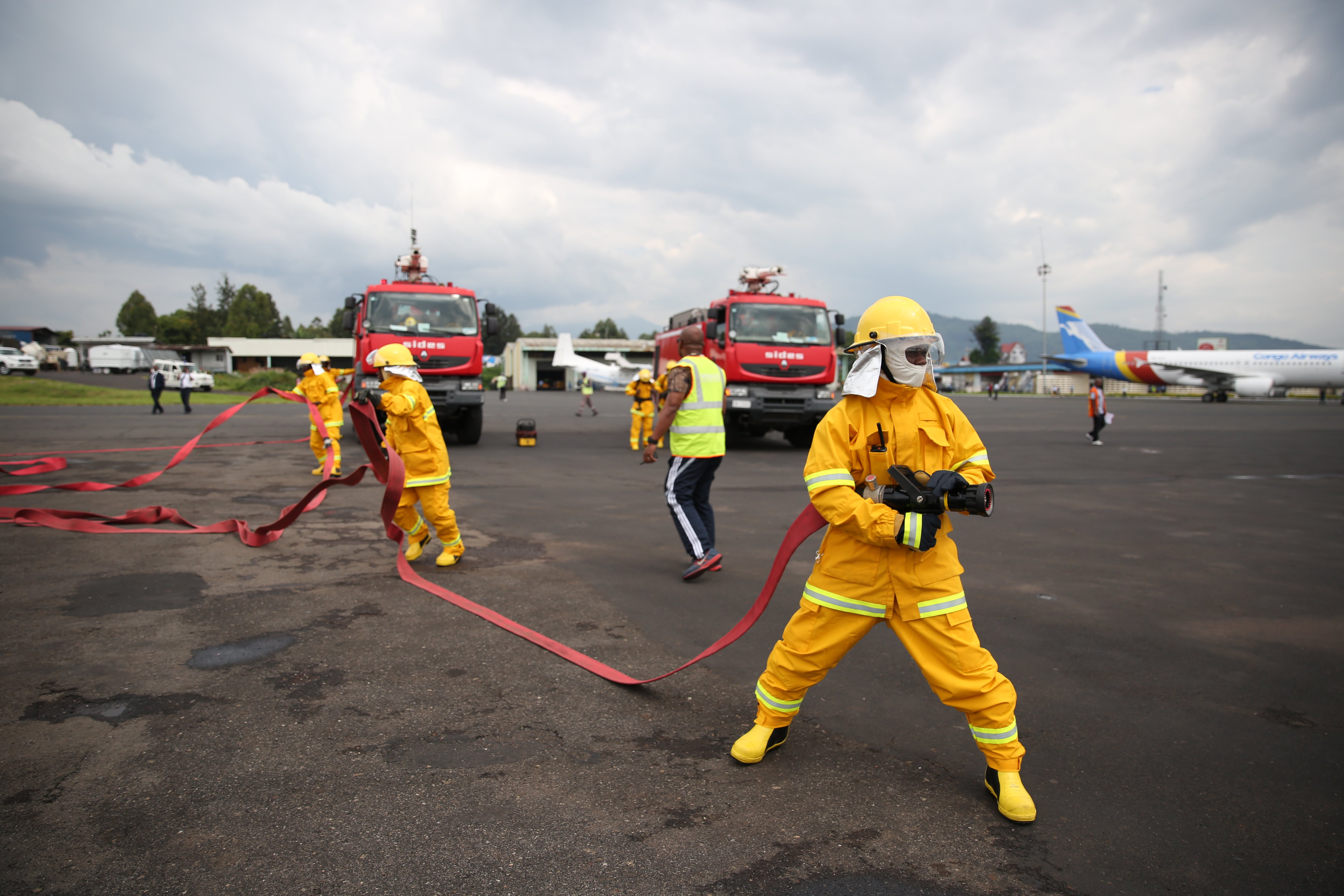
RVA firefighters conducting a fire simulation drill involving a civilian aircraft on the apron of Goma International Airport.

The RVA's origins can be traced to its predecessor, the Service d'Aéronautique Civile (SAC – Civil Aviation Service). At the time, the SAC was the eighth department under the Ministry of Transport and Channels of Communication, which itself was subordinate to the Ministry of Public Works until 1961. That year, a significant reform in February resulted in the division of the sixth department into three separate ministries: Public Works, Bridges and Roads, Posts and Telecommunications, and Transport and Communication. As a result of this reform, the services for aeronautics and meteorology were transferred from the Ministry of Public Works to the Ministry of Transport and Communication. The same reform also introduced the creation of what became known as the "Aviation Policy Commission" (Commission de la politique aérienne), whose primary role was to advise the Congolese government on civil aviation issues. This commission later evolved into the Conseil Supérieur de l'Aviation Civile (CSAC), or Higher Civil Aviation Council, in 1966, a regulatory body that remained operational. Following this institutional shift, the Congolese government entered into cooperation agreements with two major international partners: the Federal Aviation Administration (FAA) of the United States, an agency under the U.S. Department of Transportation responsible for regulating civil aviation, and SOFREAVIA (Société Française d'Études et de Réalisation d'Équipements Aéronautiques), a French company specializing in aeronautical studies and infrastructure. Under the terms of these agreements, both entities were to provide technical experts to support the establishment and operational structuring of the newly envisioned national aviation authority.

The RVA was officially established by Ordinance-Law No. 072-13 of 21 February 1972, which formalized its creation as a national entity responsible for managing and developing air transport infrastructure nationwide. Its legal framework was subsequently reinforced by Law No. 078/002 of 6 January 1978 and Ordinances No. 078/200 of 5 May 1978 and No. 82/1981 of 4 December 1982, which defined the structure and governance of public enterprises, including the appointment procedures for boards of directors. In line with the Congolese government's broader reform of state enterprises, the Decree No. 09/11/2009 of 24 April 2009 transformed the RVA into a commercial entity with legal personality and financial autonomy.

== Administration and organization ==
=== Decision-making bodies ===
RVA's central governing bodies are the Board of Directors, the Management Committee, and the General Delegation.

The Board of Directors, regarded as the supreme decision-making organ, consists of administrators (administrateurs) appointed by the President of the Republic for renewable five-year mandates. Chaired by a president appointed through presidential decree, the Board is responsible for significant decisions, including acquisitions, asset sales, equity investments, and the preparation of financial reports, as outlined in Ordinance No. 78/002 of 6 January 1978, which governs public enterprises.

The Management Committee serves as the RVA's executive body, responsible for overseeing its administrative and operational affairs. It is headed by the General Delegate (Director General; directeur général), supported by the Deputy General Delegate. Both positions are appointed by presidential decree, while the committee also includes two directors designated by the Board of Directors and one staff representative. The current General Delegate is Louis-Blaise Londolé, who previously served as Deputy General Delegate. He was appointed interim Director General on 23 September 2025 following the suspension of Léonard Ngoma Mbaki on 19 September after a power outage at N'djili International Airport disrupted the landing of the presidential aircraft. Mbaki had been appointed General Delegate of the RVA by presidential decree on 12 December 2023 and assumed office on 11 January 2024. After the expiration of his suspension on 19 December 2025, Londolé continued to serve as interim Director General, and on 23 February 2026, President Félix Tshisekedi appointed him as Director General.

The committee, delegated by the Board, administers finances, supervises operations, and prepares the RVA's accounts. Although it operates with considerable independence, its actions remain under the supervision of the relevant oversight authority, which may perform pre-, concurrent, or post-control audits as outlined in Ordinance No. 19 of 29 March 1982.

The General Delegation stands at the top of the operational hierarchy, headed by the General Delegate Administrator (Administrateur directeur général; ADG), who functions as the RVA's chief executive officer. Reporting directly to the GDA are several specialized units, including the Legal Counsel, the Study and Strategy Unit (Cellule d'Étude et de Stratégies – CES), the Internal Audit Department, the Public Relations Division, and the Central Secretariat. The Legal Counsel ensures legal conformity and offers advisory services to all organizational bodies, while the CES formulates development strategies, defines performance benchmarks, and evaluates project outcomes. The Internal Audit Department ensures that financial and administrative records are accurate. The Public Relations Division coordinates corporate communications and stakeholder relations, whereas the Central Secretariat manages correspondence between the General Delegate's office, internal departments, and external institutions.

=== Design and planning bodies ===
The design and planning bodies conceive, structure, and execute the RVA's technical and administrative development programs. These bodies are divided into two main categories: technical and administrative departments.

==== Technical ====
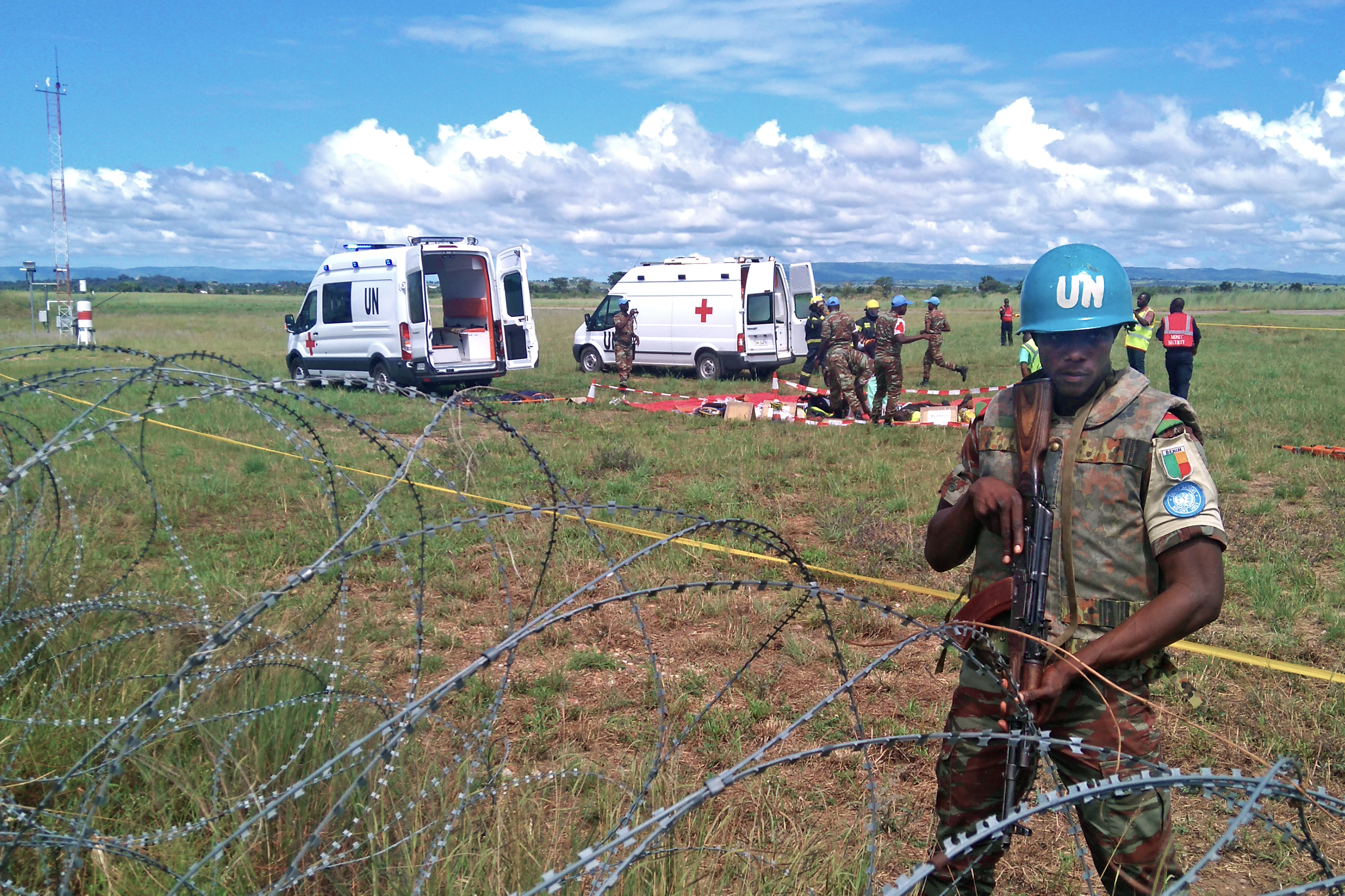
An Emergency Response Plan exercise simulating an aircraft accident in progress at Kalemie Airport, conducted with the active participation of the RVA, logistics sections, and the Benin contingent of MONUSCO.

The technical bodies include the Technical Department, Maintenance Department, Operations Department, and the Infrastructure, Runways, and Buildings Department. The Technical Department oversees divisions dedicated to radio communication, navigational aids (including VOR, DME, and ILS systems), and Energy and Lighting. The Maintenance Department is responsible for the regular servicing and repair of important electrical and lighting systems. The Operations Department manages human, material, and financial resources to ensure smooth airport operations in accordance with international aviation standards. The Infrastructure, Runways, and Buildings Department undertakes the construction, rehabilitation, and modernization of airport structures nationwide, in strict conformity with the requirements of the International Civil Aviation Organization (ICAO) and the International Air Transport Association (IATA).

==== Administrative ====
The administrative bodies include the Administrative Department, which is responsible for managing human resources, employee welfare, compensation, and professional training. Within this department, the Kinshasa Personnel Division supervises the management of staff based in the capital, including the maintenance of employment files, payroll processing, and procedures for career progression. The division also offers specialized services, including the Career Management Service, which oversees staff classification and payroll automation, and the Attendance Control Office, which tracks employee attendance and evaluates performance.

Within this structure, there are several specialized services:

- The Documentation Service manages the transfer and assignment of RVA personnel.
- The Administrative Litigation Service handles legal disputes between RVA employees and the employer, as well as financial claims involving social and professional organizations such as the General Directorate of Taxes (Direction Générale des Impôts; DGI), National Social Security Institute (Institut National de Sécurité Sociale; INSS), and National Institute for Professional Preparation (Institut National de Préparation Professionnelle; INPP). It mediates conflicts related to disciplinary actions, dismissals, or contractual breaches, offering internal resolution mechanisms and, when necessary, recourse through the Tribunal de Paix de Gombe following labor inspector conciliation procedures.
- The Personnel Movement Service manages all administrative actions related to employee departures, resignations, revocations, reinstatements, and leaves of absence. It operates through two offices: the Personnel Statistics and Records Office.
