= 2013 Compagnie Africaine d'Aviation Fokker 50 crash =

Plane crash in the Democratic Republic of the Congo

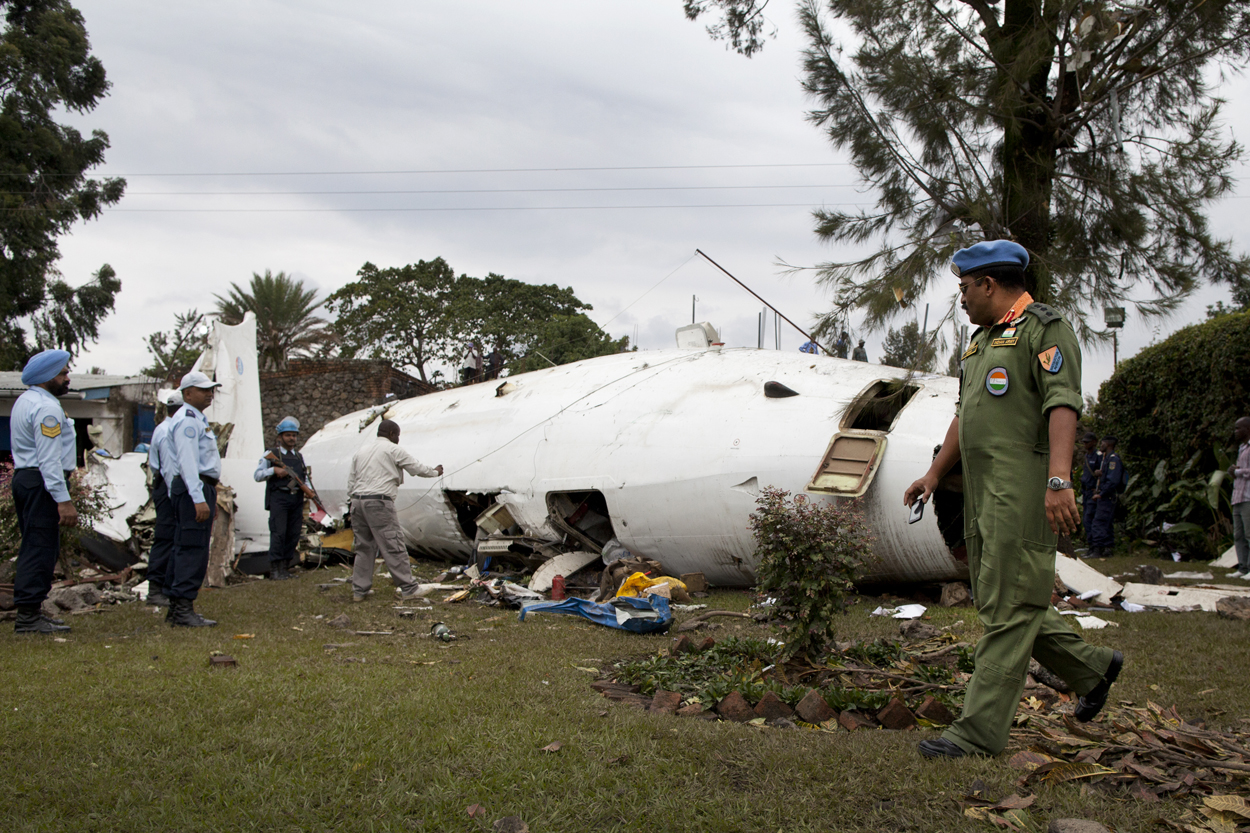
- MONUSCO troops guarding the crash site in Goma

Accident
- Date: 4 March 2013
- Summary: Crashed on approach in poor weather
- Site: Goma, Democratic Republic of the Congo; 1°41′S 29°14′E

Aircraft
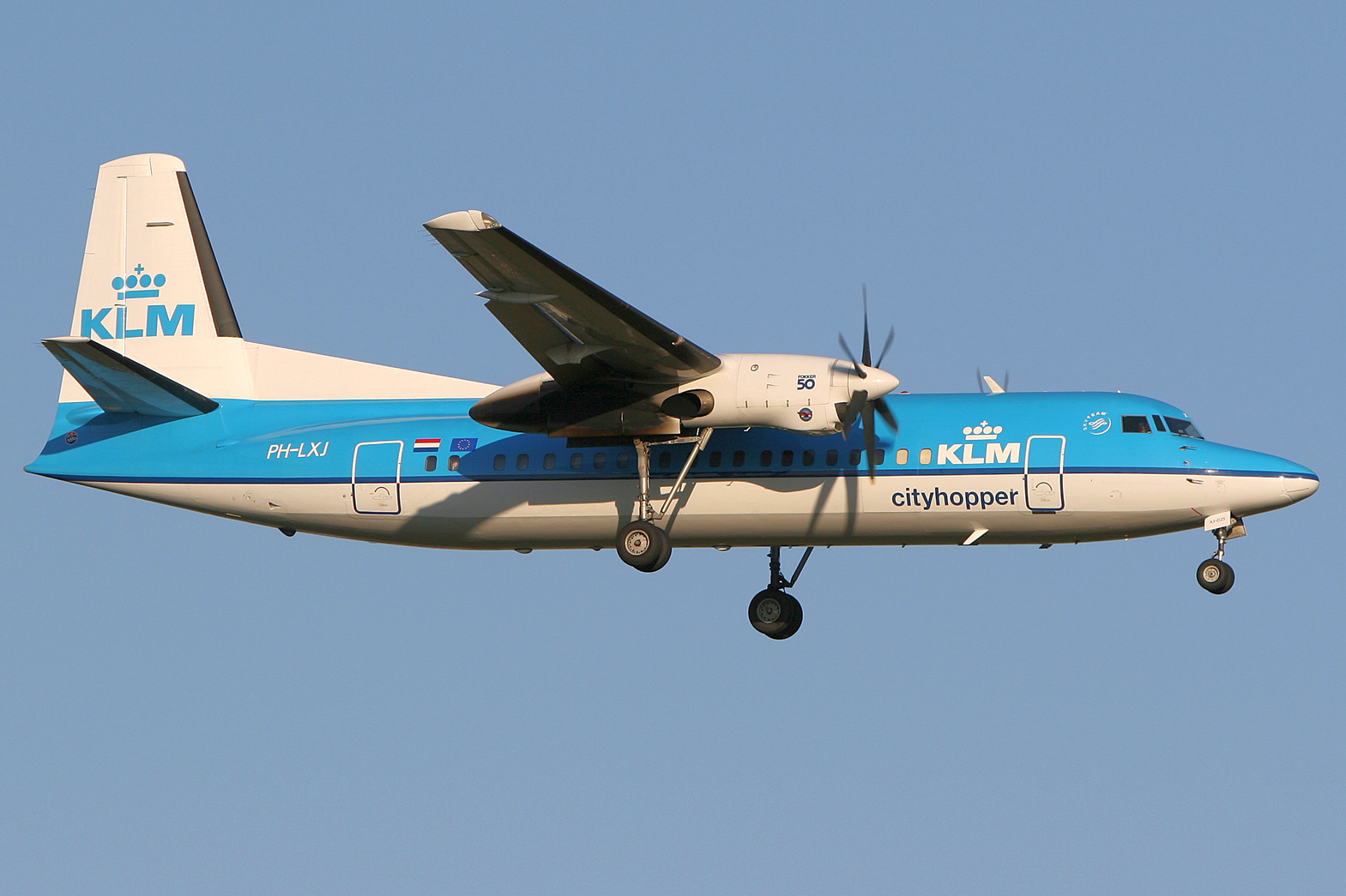
- The aircraft involved in the accident, photographed in 2006 while in service KLM Cityhopper
- Aircraft type: Fokker 50
- Operator: Compagnie Africaine d'Aviation
- Registration: 9Q-CBD
- Flight origin: Lodja Airport, Lodja, Democratic Republic of the Congo
- Destination: Goma International Airport, Goma, Democratic Republic of the Congo
- Occupants: 9
- Passengers: 4
- Crew: 5
- Fatalities: 6
- Injuries: 3
- Survivors: 3

On 4 March 2013, a Fokker 50 operated by Compagnie Africaine d'Aviation on a domestic cargo flight from Lodja to Goma, Democratic Republic of the Congo, crashed in poor weather on approach to Goma Airport. There were nine people on board, of which six were killed. No fatalities were reported on the ground, despite the aircraft crashing into a populated area.

== Aircraft ==
The aircraft involved in the accident was a twin-turboprop Fokker 50, powered by two Pratt & Whitney Canada PW125B engines; it first flew in 1992 with registration PH-LXJ. Having serial number 20270, it was delivered to AirUK in 1994 and re-registered G-UKTE. This registration was kept following the rebranding of Air UK to KLM uk in 1998. KLM Cityhopper re-registered the aircraft as PH-LXJ in 2003, and returned it to the lessor in 2010. In March of the same year, it was re-registered 9Q-CBD and delivered to Compagnie Africaine d'Aviation. The aircraft was 20 years old at the time of the accident.

== Accident ==
The aircraft was two minutes from touching down at Goma airport on a cargo service from Lodja Airport, 640 kilometres (400 mi) west of Goma. At 17:55 local time, the aircraft crashed in an empty lot in the middle of the city. No distress calls were made prior to the crash.

There were nine people on board the aircraft, including six airline employees—a crew of five and a security guard—and three passengers. All six employees were killed in the accident. Except for the pilot, a 46-year-old Russian national named Alexander Bazhenov, the dead were all from the Congo. The Russian consul to the Democratic Republic of the Congo confirmed that a Russian national was on board.

== Aftermath ==
Following the crash, the Ministry of Transport of the Democratic Republic of the Congo announced a re-certification of all airlines having an operator's certificate issued in the country that were subject to a ban in the European Union.

== See also ==
- List of airlines banned in the EU
- Transport in the Democratic Republic of the Congo
