= Agefreco Air =

Airline of the Democratic Republic of the Congo

IATA	ICAO	Call sign
-	-	-
- Founded: 1998
- Ceased operations: 2007?
- Destinations: 12 (across history)
- Headquarters: Kinshasa, Democratic Republic of the Congo
- Website: http://agefreco.netii.net/index.php

Agefreco Air was an air carrier operating in the Democratic Republic of the Congo and has been operating since 1998.

== History ==
Agefreco Air was established in the year of 1988 and began flying passengers from Bukavu to eastern parts of the Congo. The first aircraft in the fleet was the Antonov AN 28. The airline soon expanded to various cities in the Democratic Republic of the Congo. The airline operated an Antonov AN 26 for the Great Lakes Business Company ended up crashing which later would have the airline close its doors.

In 2022 an LET 410 was reported to have caught fire but Agefreco might have been the parent company of the operator which was Doren Air Cargo

== Destinations ==
=== Congo (Kinshasa) ===
- Goma
- Kitutu
- Kisangani
- Puina
- Kinshasa
- Lubumbashi
- Kongolo
- Kasese
- Kalima
- Lugushwa
- Kamituga
- Shabunda

== Fleet ==
- Antonov AN 32
- Antonov 28
- LET 410
- Antonov AN 26 (by GLBC)

== Accidents and incidents ==
- On 23 August 2001, an Agrefreco Air / Victoria Air Antonov An-28 (registration 3C-LLA) from Bukavu's Kavume Airport to Kapmene airport boards additional passengers and minerals at Kama town airport. Eight minutes after takeoff, an engine failed, and the Russian pilots diverted to Bukavu. It crashed at Mugogo, 15 mi (24 km) short of Kavumu, killing seven of eleven aboard. The aircraft is reported to be owned by Bashengezi Mirindi Patrice .
- On 26 August 2007, an Agefreco/Great Lakes Business Company operated Antonov An-26 departing Kongolo Airport (KOO) has engine failure at takeoff and crashes into a tree. All three crew and eleven of twelve passengers are killed. The aircraft is reported to have an insured value of US$300,000.

== Notes ==
1. Despite claiming the aircraft in the picture of their homepage is an Antonov AN 28 it is actually an AN 32
2. In the fleet section the AN 28 shows an Antonov AN 2 image and the LET 410 shows a Beechcraft King Air

== See also ==
- Transport in the Democratic Republic of the Congo
