= RVA =

RVA may refer to:

- Régie des Voies Aériennes de la République Démocratique du Congo
- Richmond, Virginia
- RVA Magazine, an art, music and opinion magazine for Richmond, VA
- Relative Virtual Address, a concept in the COFF format
- Rift Valley Academy, a boarding school outside of Nairobi, Kenya
