= BPEA =

BPEA may refer to:

- 9,10-Bis(phenylethynyl)anthracene
- Baring Private Equity Asia
- Brookings Papers on Economic Activity
- Bureau Permanent d’Enquêtes d’Accidents et Incidents d’Aviation
