= Compagnie Africaine d'Aviation =

Regional airline from the Democratic Republic of the Congo

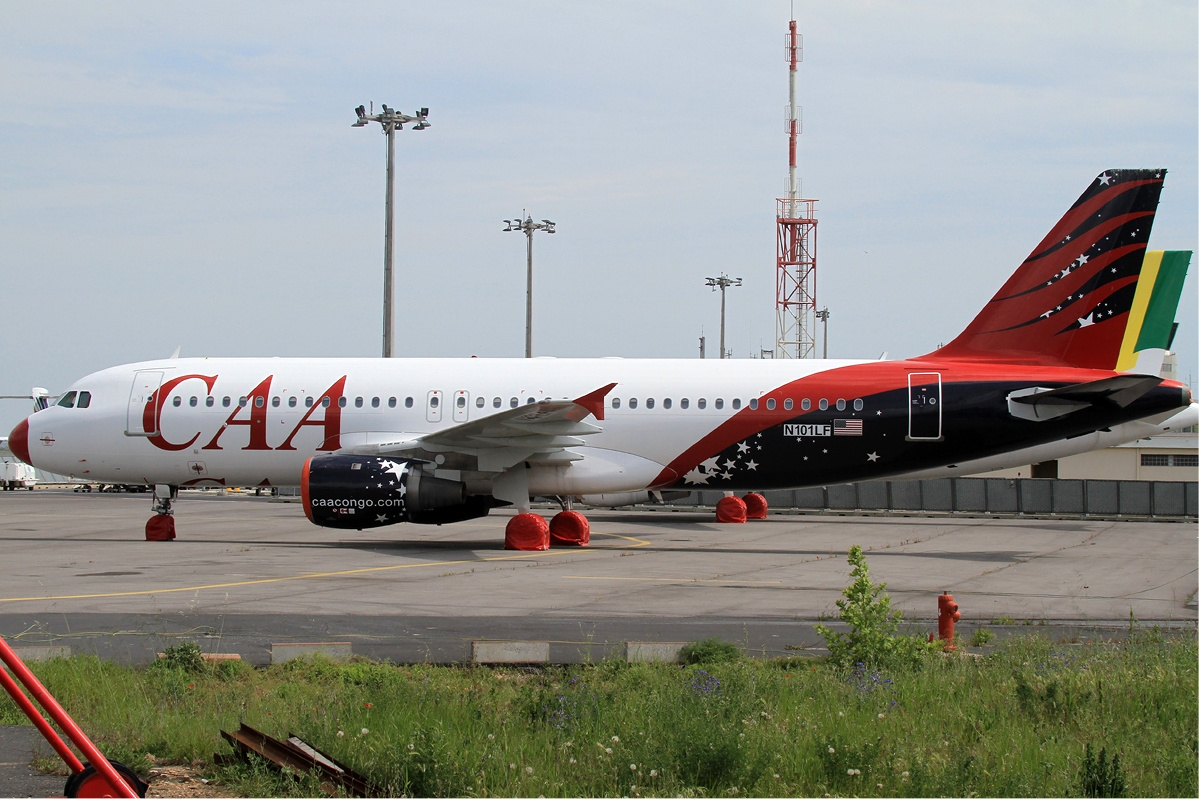
IATA	ICAO	Call sign
BU	DBP	AFRICAN
- Founded: 1991
- Operating bases: N'djili Airport
- Focus cities: Lubumbashi International Airport
- Frequent-flyer program: Horizons
- Fleet size: 5
- Destinations: 11
- Headquarters: Kinshasa, Democratic Republic of the Congo
- Key people: David Blattner; Daniel Blattner
- Website: caacongo.com

Compagnie Africaine d'Aviation, is a regional airline from the Democratic Republic of the Congo, based at N'djili Airport in Kinshasa.

== History ==
Compagnie Africaine d'Aviation (CAA) was originally founded in 1991 and started operations on 26 December 1992. In 2013, CAA merged with FlyCongo and formed flyCAA, briefly using this name for marketing before reverting to CAA.

In January 2016, the airline terminated their only international route to Johannesburg after failing to receive renewed traffic rights. In 2020, the airline acquired an Airbus A330-200 with the stated intention of flying to Brussels, Belgium, which under current European Union restrictions would require CAA to operate the service using foreign registration and crew, as CAA has been banned in the EU.

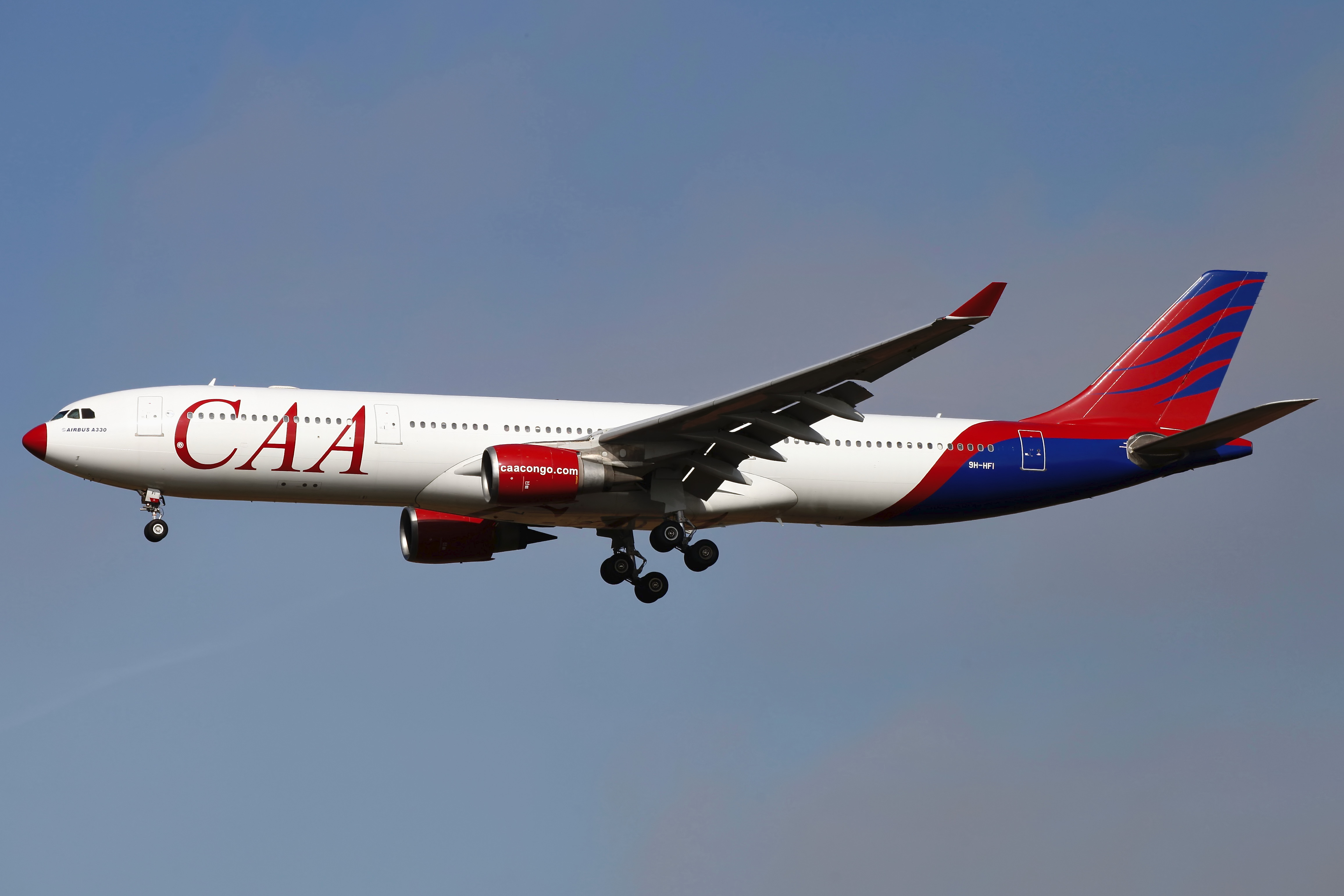
CAA A330 (2025)

In 2024, CAA expanded its fleet with a leased Boeing 767-200BDSF cargo aircraft. In 2025, KF Aerospace bought a third ATR 72-500 from flyCAA. CAA added an A321 freighter to boost cargo capacity and reactivated its sole A330-300. CAA also faced numerous cancellations in 2025 along with other carriers.

== Destinations ==
According to the August 2013 timetable, CAA operated scheduled flights to the following destinations.

State	City	Airport
DR Congo	Beni	Beni Airport
DR Congo	Boende	Boende Airport
DR Congo	Bukavu	Kavumu Airport
DR Congo	Bumba	Bumba Airport
DR Congo	Bunia	Bunia Airport
DR Congo	Gemena	Gemena Airport
DR Congo	Goma	Goma International Airport
DR Congo	Isiro	Matari Airport
DR Congo	Kalemie	Kalemie Airport
DR Congo	Kananga	Kananga Airport
DR Congo	Kindu	Kindu Airport
DR Congo	Kinshasa	N'djili Airport base
DR Congo	Kisangani	Bangoka International Airport
DR Congo	Kongolo	Kongolo Airport
DR Congo	Lisala	Lisala Airport
DR Congo	Lodja	Lodja Airport
DR Congo	Lubumbashi	Lubumbashi International Airport focus city
DR Congo	Mbandaka	Mbandaka Airport
DR Congo	Mbuji-Mayi	Mbuji Mayi Airport
DR Congo	Tshikapa	Tshikapa Airport

== Fleet ==
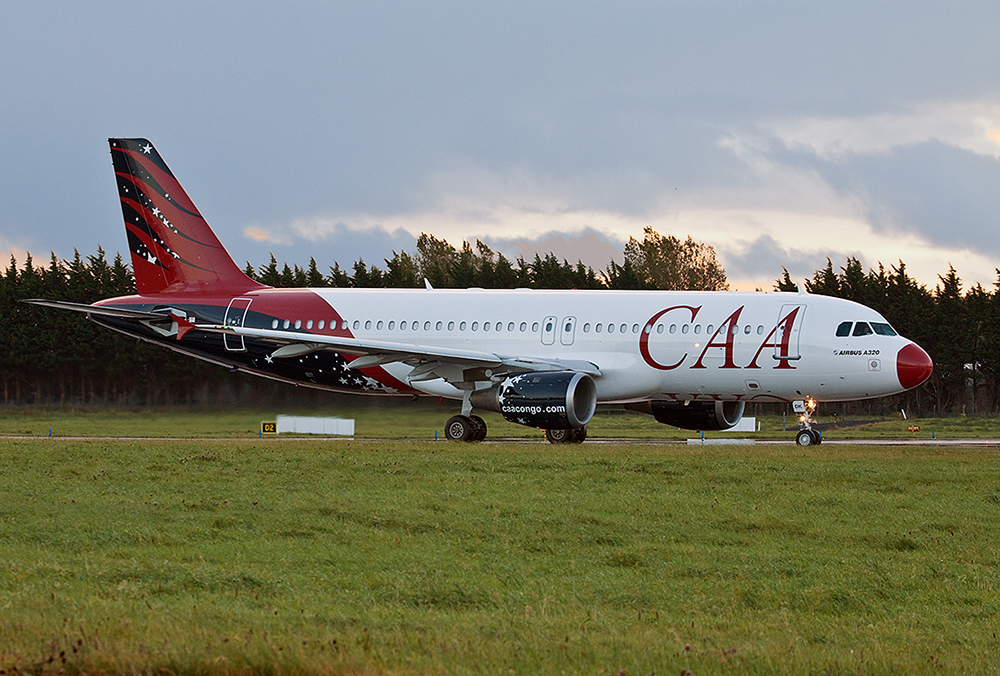
CAA Airbus A320-200 (2011)

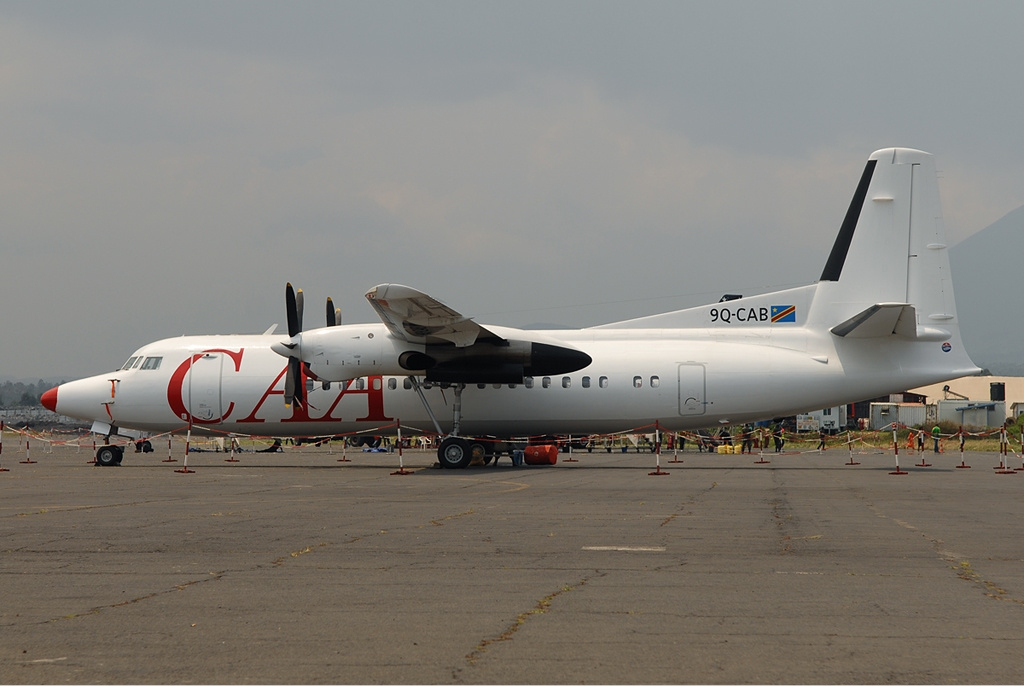
CAA Fokker 50 (2010)

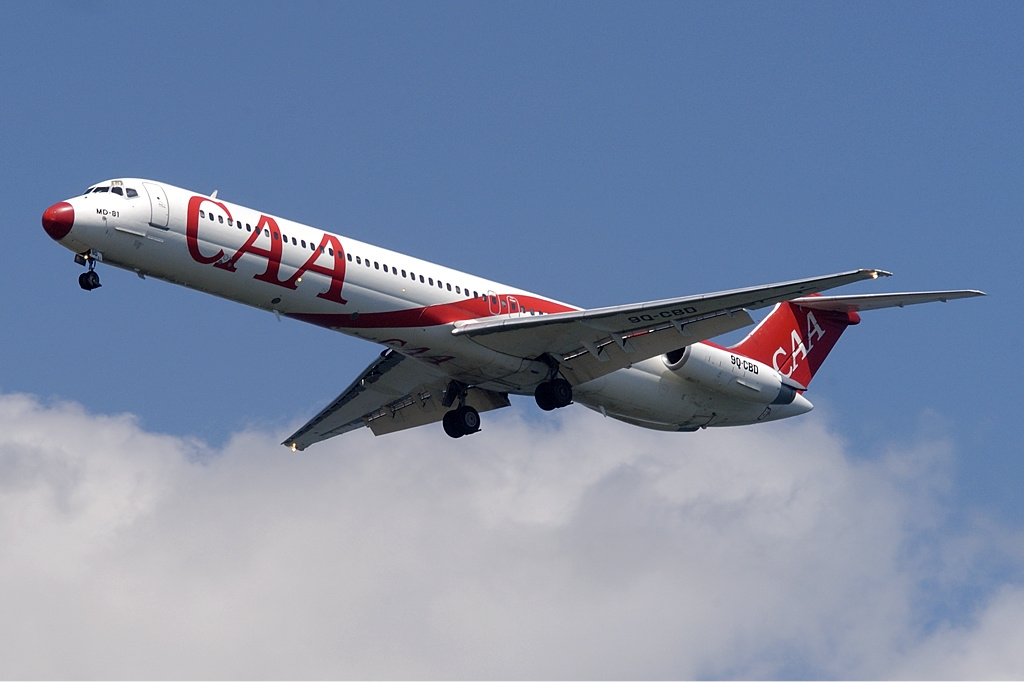
A former CAA McDonnell Douglas MD-81 (2006)

=== Current fleet ===
As of July 2026, CAA operates the following aircraft:

flyCAA current fleet
Aircraft	In service	Orders	Passengers	Notes
Airbus A320	3	—	180	
Airbus A321P2F	1	—		
Airbus A330-300	1	—	406	
Total	5	—		

=== Former fleet ===
Previously, CAA also operated the following aircraft types:

flyCAA historic fleet
Aircraft	Introduced	Retired	Refs
Ilyushin Il-18	unknown	unknown	

== Accidents and incidents ==
- On 1 April 1997, a Convair CV-580 (registered 9Q-CRU) was destroyed at Tshikapa Airport when it overshot the runway and hit an embankment following a failed take-off abortion. There were 14 occupants on board the scheduled flight to Mbuji-Mayi.
- On 18 November 1999, another CV-580 (registered 9Q-CEJ) had to be written off following an off-airport emergency landing near Tshikapa due to an engine failure that had been encountered shortly into the flight to Kananga.
- On 19 November 2009, Flight 3711 from Kinshasa overran the runway upon landing at Goma Airport. Of the 117 occupants on board the aircraft, a McDonnell Douglas MD-82 registered 9Q-CAB, around 20 were injured.
- On 2 January 2010, a cargo-configured Boeing 727 (registered 9Q-CAA) veered off the runway during an emergency landing attempt in heavy rain at N'djili Airport. Previously, the pilots had reported a loss of hydraulic pressure.
- The only fatal accident involving an aircraft of Compagnie d'Aviation Africaine occurred on 4 March 2013, when a Fokker 50 (registered 9Q-CBD) crashed near Goma International Airport. Of the nine people who had been on the flight from Lodja, six were killed.
- On 29 January 2023, an Airbus A320 departing from Mbuji Mayi dropped a part of the left elevator on departure. Everyone on board survived the incident.
- On 16 August 2023, an Airbus A330 returned to Lubumbashi following an engine failure.

== See also ==
- List of airlines of the Democratic Republic of the Congo
- List of companies based in the Democratic Republic of the Congo
