= Kavumu Airport =

Kuvumu Airport Aéroport de Bukavu-Kuvumu Bukavu Kuvumu Airport
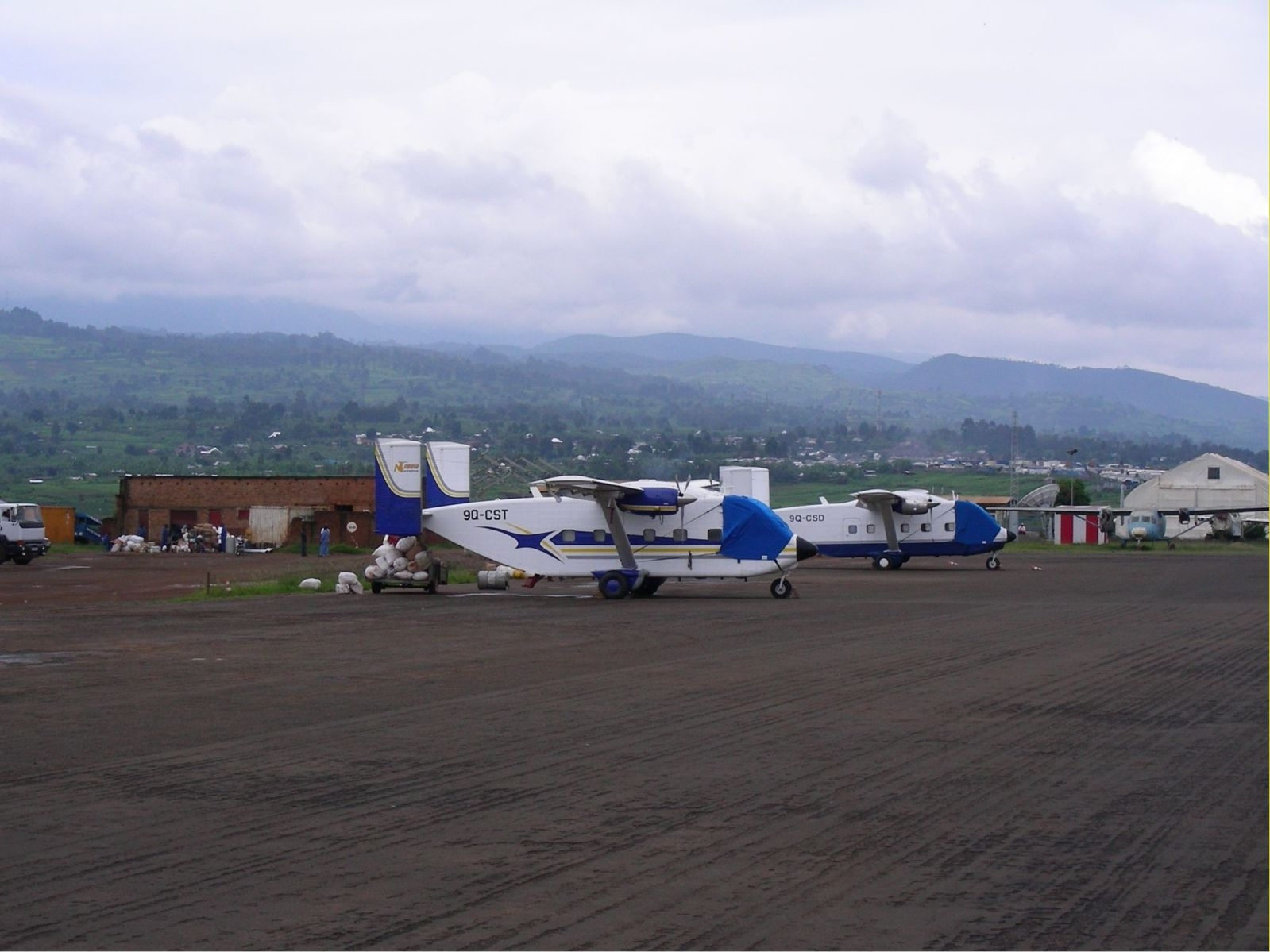
- Aircraft at the Kavumu Airport
- IATA: BKY; ICAO: FZMA

Summary
- Airport type: Public
- Operator: Government
- Serves: Bukavu, Democratic Republic of the Congo
- Location: Bugorhe, Kabare Chiefdom, Kabare Territory
- Elevation AMSL: 5,659 ft (1,725 m)
- Coordinates: 2°18′30″S 28°48′31″E

Map
- Location in the Democratic Republic of the Congo

Runways
Direction	Length		Surface
Direction	m	ft	Surface
17/35	2,000	6,562	Asphalt
- Source: WAD GCM Google Maps

Kavumu Airport (IATA: BKY, ICAO: FZMA) (French: Aéroport de Kavumu) is an airport located in the Bugorhe groupement, within Kabare Chiefdom of Kabare Territory, in South Kivu, eastern Democratic Republic of the Congo. It serves as the principal airport for Bukavu and is situated approximately 25 kilometers (16 miles) north of the urban center.

The Bukavu non-directional beacon (Ident: BKV) is located on the field.

== History ==
During the colonial era, the city of Bukavu relied entirely on Kamembe Airport in neighboring Rwanda, located east of Bukavu. In 1967, however, the Rwandan authorities refused to permit Congolese military aircraft to land at Kamembe Airport to intervene in the conflict led by Jean Schramme in eastern Democratic Republic of Congo. This refusal accentuated the urgent need for an airport in South Kivu. After technical assessments were carried out, the site of Kavumu, which is located about 35 kilometers from Bukavu in Kabare Territory, was chosen as the most suitable location. Construction began in 1968, and the first aircraft landed on the runway at Kavumu in December 1969, which was initially named Michel Micombero Airport after the Burundian president at the time. It was President Michel Micombero who agreed to make these airports available for T-28 bombers deployed to assist in the fight against Jean Schramme.

On 31 January 2022, operations at Kavumu Airport were temporarily halted due to runway rehabilitation works. The project was being carried out by the Congolese engineering and construction company Toha Investment, which had been assigned the task by President Félix Tshisekedi. Toha Investissement used machinery supplied by Trabemco, another local engineering and construction firm, and the entire project lasted 15 days. On 22 October 2024, a contract was signed with the SOKERICO construction company to rehabilitate and modernize the airport. The agreement was endorsed by representatives of the Ministry of Transport, Communications and Rural Development, the Monitoring and Supervision Mission, the Régie des Voies Aériennes (RVA), and the South Kivu provincial government through the Provincial Minister of Transport.

On 14 February 2025, amid the Bukavu offensive during the M23 campaign, the airport was seized by the March 23 Movement. Wazalendo subsequently launched an offensive on 9 April that captured several villages in Kalehe Territory and up to twelve villages along the RN2 road in Kabare Territory. In response, the M23 deployed large reinforcements from North Kivu and Bukavu to Kabare Territory to regain control of the RN2 route, although Wazalendo forces continued to challenge their presence in the area. On 13 April, Wazalendo fighters briefly occupied Kavumu Airport after M23 redeployed troops from the airport to reinforce its operations near Katana along the RN2.

== Facilities ==
Kavumu Airport is composed of several administrative and technical facilities. It has a runway used for takeoff and landing measuring 200 m in length and 45 m in width, crossed by the runway axis. The airport also contains two aircraft parking areas: the northern tarmac measuring 100 × 60 m and the southern tarmac measuring 200 × 100 m. Six taxiways connect the runway to these tarmacs. On each side, there are grass safety strips measuring 52.5 m. In addition, the airport has a meteorological station that records atmospheric conditions every sixty minutes, including temperature, wind speed and direction, atmospheric pressure, cloud ceiling, rainfall, humidity, and visibility. The terminal building consists of two main sections, a departure pavilion and an arrival pavilion, along with commercial areas and a VIP lounge.

Security and operational management at the airport are handled by staff from the Régie des Voies Aériennes (RVA), who coordinate and provide safe air navigation to prevent aircraft accidents and collisions on the ground, particularly in parking areas. They are also responsible for collecting aviation fees across South Kivu and throughout the Democratic Republic of the Congo. The RVA ensures passenger and aircraft safety on the ground, manages airport infrastructure, and contributes to national security by supervising entry and exit points into the country.

== Airlines and destinations ==
Airlines	Destinations
Compagnie Africaine d'Aviation	Goma, Kalemie, Kongolo, Lubumbashi

== Accidents and incidents ==
- On 1 September 2008, a Beechcraft 1900C-1 registered as ZS-OLD operated by CEM Air for the charity Air Serv International was 15 km out on approach to Bukavu when it flew into a steep ridge on Mount Kahuzi at 10,000 ft near Bukavu-Kavumu. All 15 passengers and 2 crew aboard were killed.
- On 14 February 2011, a LET L-410 registered 9Q-CIF of African Air Services Commuter flying a cargo flight on behalf of the World Food Programme from Kavumu to Lusenge (near Kava) crashed shortly after departure from Kavumu Airport. The aircraft impacted Mont Bienga, killing both the Ukrainian pilot and Congolese co-pilot, and destroying the aircraft.
- On 12 February 2012, a Gulfstream IV business jet carrying then-finance minister (and future prime minister) of the DRC, Matata Ponyo Mapon, crashed while landing at Kavumu airport. The crash killed both pilots and two passengers as well as two farmers on the ground, while two passengers including Ponyo survived with injuries.

== See also ==
- Transport in Democratic Republic of the Congo
- List of airports in Democratic Republic of the Congo
- Media related to Kavumu Airport at Wikimedia Commons
