= 2019 Busy Bee Congo Dornier 228 crash =

Plane crash in the Democratic Republic of the Congo

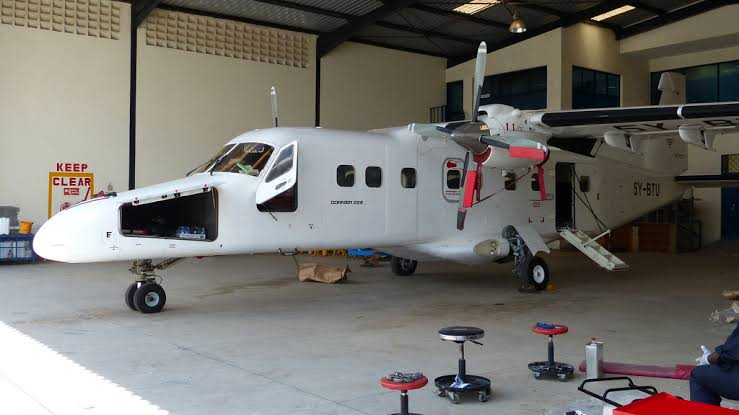
- The aircraft involved in the accident, with a previous operator

Accident
- Date: 24 November 2019
- Summary: Engine failure on takeoff
- Site: Goma International Airport, Goma, Democratic Republic of the Congo; 1°40′53″S 29°14′22″E
- Total fatalities: 27 (21 on airplane, 6 on ground)
- Total injuries: 1 (on ground)

Aircraft
- Aircraft type: Dornier 228-201
- Operator: Busy Bee Congo
- Registration: 9S-GNH
- Flight origin: Goma International Airport
- Destination: Beni Airport
- Occupants: 22
- Passengers: 20
- Crew: 2
- Fatalities: 21
- Survivors: 1

Ground casualties
- Ground fatalities: 6
- Ground injuries: 1

On 24 November 2019, a Dornier 228-201 twin turboprop aircraft, operated by local carrier Busy Bee Congo, crashed shortly after takeoff from Goma International Airport in a densely populated section of the city, killing 21 of the 22 on board and 6 on the ground. It is the deadliest accident involving the Dornier 228.

== Background ==
The airline operating the plane, Busy Bee Congo, was founded in 2007 and uses Goma as the base for its fleet of Dornier 228s. Airline safety standards and maintenance practices are notoriously lax in the Democratic Republic of the Congo, especially among local low-price carriers, with all the local carriers banned from operating in the European Union.

=== Aircraft and crew ===
The aircraft was a Dornier 228 twin turboprop built in 1984. It had been owned by three previous operators. The aircraft did not carry a cockpit voice recorder or a flight data recorder. While in service with Olympic Aviation (during which its registration was SX-BHC), the aircraft was involved in two previous accidents; on 19 December 1993, while landing at Sitia Public Airport, the aircraft lost one its left landing gear wheels. On 9 January 1994, the aircraft struck power lines on approach to runway 15L at Ellinikon International Airport and its left engine failed, but landed safely with no fatalities.

The unnamed 52-year-old captain had 14,124 flight hours, including 3,048 hours on the Dornier 228. The unnamed 29-year-old first officer had 2,273 flight hours, with 1,635 of them on the Dornier 228.

== Accident ==
According to reports, the aircraft suffered engine failure and crashed less than a minute after takeoff from Runway 17. Witnesses describe the plane spinning three times as it crashed, with thick black smoke coming from the engines. The aircraft violently burst in flames after impact in one of the densely populated areas of the city, and the fire prevented locals from helping victims caught in the blaze.

Nineteen people on board were killed on impact. One source reports that two passengers managed to be pulled from the blaze. The BBC reported at the time that the nine casualties on the ground all came from one family. There was one survivor from the aircraft, who sustained minor injuries, leaving both of the pilots and 19 passengers dead. Among the ground casualties were five children with their mother inside an unfinished house. A wooden cabin next to the unfinished house was blown away by backwash from the aircraft. The local residents helped extinguish the fire after the crash until firefighters were able to bring it under control.

== Investigation ==
On 27 November 2019, the Permanent Office of Investigations of Aviation Accidents/Incidents (BPEA), part of the DRC's Ministry of Transport and Channels of Communication, opened the investigation. On 10 January 2020 the BPEA released its preliminary report.
