= LJA =

LJA or lja may refer to:

- ISO 639-3 code for the Golpa language, an Australian Aboriginal language
- Postal code for Lija, Malta
- IATA code for Lodja Airport, Democratic Republic of the Congo
