= LIQ =

LIQ or liq may refer to:

- LIQ, the IATA code for Lisala Airport, Democratic Republic of the Congo
- liq, the ISO 639-3 code for Libido language, Ethiopia
