= Flight 7 =

Flight 7 or Flight 007 may refer to:

- Western Air Express Flight 7, a 1937 crash of a Western Air Express Boeing 247B
- Pan Am Flight 7, a 1957 crash of a Pan Am Boeing 377 Stratocruiser 10–29
- Air France Flight 007, a 1962 crash of an Air France Boeing 707
- Avensa Flight 007, a 1983 crash of an Avensa air DC-9
- LOT Polish Airlines Flight 007, a 1980 crash of a LOT Polish Airlines Ilyushin Il-62
- Korean Air Lines Flight 007, a 1983 incident in which a Korean Air Lines Boeing 747 was shot down over or near Moneron Island
- Midwest Express Flight 007, a 2001 near miss with United Airlines flight 175, leading to 4 injuries and minor damage to the aircraft. Aircraft was involved was a DC-9-32.
- Kata Air Transport Flight 007, a 2008 accident where an Antonov An-32 crashed due to an engine malfunction
- Starship flight test 7, an unsuccessful flight of the SpaceX Starship rocket in January 2025
