= Airmark Indonesia =

Airline of Indonesia

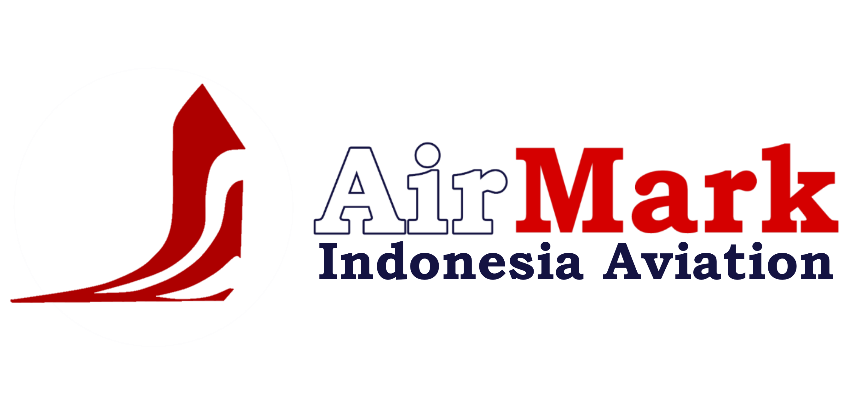
IATA	ICAO	Call sign
AI	AIA	AIRMARK
- Founded: 1998
- Ceased operations: 2011
- Hubs: Jakarta
- Fleet size: 1
- Headquarters: Jakarta, Indonesia
- Website: www.airmarkairlines.co.cc

PT Airmark Indonesia Airlines was an airline based in Jakarta, Indonesia. It operated scheduled, regional and domestic, passenger services as well as scheduled express cargo services, ad hoc charter services and relief missions. Its main base was Halim Perdanakusuma International Airport, Jakarta.

== History ==
The airline was established in 1998 and is owned by the Bellgrand Group and open for local or foreign investors. In 2010 PT Airmark Indonesia Airlines will reviving its AOC by acquiring a Boeing 757 from international partner. In 2010 the AOC was suspended.

== Services ==
In the past, PT Airmark Indonesia Airlines operated the former Bouraq Indonesia Airlines shuttle between Bali and Lombok, and also flew to Sumbawa. New services in 2010 had included a charter flight service between Denpasar and Seoul, a 6 hours and 45 minutes direct flight. A Denpasar and Kyiv charter flight was set to start by the end of August or early September 2010.

== Fleet ==
In 2012, Airmark Indonesia operated :

- 1 Boeing 737-300

=== Previously operated ===
As of March 2007 the Airmark Indonesia fleet included:

- 1 Indonesian Aerospace 212-200

At August 2006 the airline also operated:

- 1 Antonov An-12
- 1 Antonov An-32
