= Bureau Permanent d'Enquêtes d'Accidents et Incidents d'Aviation =

Agency overview
- Formed: 2 October 2012; 13 years ago
- Jurisdiction: Government of the Democratic Republic of the Congo
- Headquarters: Gombe, Kinshasa, Democratic Republic of the Congo
- Agency executives: Samy Tshimbalanga, President; Michou Lucien Kinzonzi Ki Kanda, Vice-President
- Parent agency: Ministry of Transport and Channels of Communication

The Bureau Permanent d'Enquêtes d'Accidents et Incidents d'Aviation (BPEA; English: "Permanent Bureau of Aviation Accident and Incident Investigations") is the aviation accident investigation authority of the Democratic Republic of the Congo. It operates under the Ministry of Transport and Channels of Communication and is responsible for conducting independent technical investigations into civil aviation accidents and incidents occurring within the territory and airspace of the DRC, as well as occurrences involving Congolese-registered aircraft.

The BPEA is headquartered on the first floor of the Immeuble Zecodiam in Gombe, Kinshasa, and was established on 2 October 2012 through Decree No. 12/035. The agency serves as the official authority responsible for issuing final accident and incident investigation reports in the DRC and works in coordination with national and international aviation organizations, including the Autorité de l'Aviation Civile (AAC), the Régie des Voies Aériennes (RVA), the International Civil Aviation Organization (ICAO), and accredited representatives from foreign states involved in aircraft design, manufacture, or operation.

== Organization and functions ==
The BPEA was established by Decree No. 12/035 of 2 October 2012 as a specialized agency operating under the authority of the Minister of Transport and Channels of Communication. It was established to act as the Democratic Republic of the Congo's official body for investigating aviation accidents and incidents, while also carrying out recommendations resulting from aviation safety oversight audits conducted by the International Civil Aviation Organization (ICAO). The decree authorizes the bureau to be staffed by as many as fifteen experts trained in aviation accident and incident investigations. The bureau's leadership consists of a President supported by a Vice-President, a Secretary, a Rapporteur, and a Deputy Rapporteur, while its daily organization and operations are governed by ministerially approved internal regulations. The bureau's responsibilities were later expanded and clarified by Law No. 23/001 of 12 January 2023, which amended and supplemented Law No. 10/014 of 31 December 2010 on Civil Aviation. Under this legislation, the BPEA serves as the national technical investigation authority for aviation occurrences within Congolese territory and airspace and may also take part in investigations involving Congolese-registered aircraft abroad.

The BPEA conducts investigations in accordance with Annex 13 to the Convention on International Civil Aviation (also known as Chicago Convention). These inquiries are intended to improve aviation safety by determining the factors that contributed to accidents and incidents rather than assigning blame or responsibility. The bureau's investigations are separate from court proceedings and administrative actions and do not seek to determine civil or criminal liability. Its duties include investigating aviation occurrences, reviewing and analyzing investigative findings, proposing measures to improve the management of accident investigations, and issuing recommendations to prevent future accidents and incidents. The BPEA also publishes final investigation reports and can issue urgent safety recommendations when significant risks require immediate attention. During investigations, BPEA investigators are empowered to enter accident sites, inspect wreckage, analyze flight and cockpit voice recorder data, review operational and maintenance records, interview witnesses, gather evidence, and seek assistance from technical specialists. The bureau may also collaborate with foreign accident investigation bodies, accredited representatives, and ICAO member states in accordance with international procedures. Beyond accident investigations, the BPEA assists in operations related to missing aircraft and cooperates with domestic and international organizations during search, rescue, and investigation missions.

== Controversy ==
During a debate held on 7 December 2019, at the Faculty Institute of Information and Communication Sciences (IFASIC), BPEA Director José Ngoto stated that the agency lacks the necessary equipment and resources to conduct thorough investigations and provide recommendations to reduce accidents in Congolese airspace. Ngoto accentuated the need for more suitable communication between BPEA and Congolese authorities, the International Civil Aviation Organization (ICAO), and aircraft manufacturers. Ngoto also pointed out that BPEA staff lacks continuous training and career development opportunities, including international internships, which negatively impact the caliber of their investigation reports. This leads to delays in the publication of final investigation reports for aircraft accidents, which are mandated by ICAO to be released within 12 months of an incident unless waived. Ngoto disclosed that out of the 34 recorded accidents between 2013 and 2018, only 16 final reports were published by BPEA. For the 32 incidents that occurred in Congolese airspace, only 13 final reports were published by the agency.

== See also ==
- Air Force of the Democratic Republic of the Congo
- Armed Forces of the Democratic Republic of the Congo
- 2019 Busy Bee Congo crash
