= Busy Bee Congo =

Congolese airline

IATA	ICAO	Call sign
-	RHT	YELLOW BEE
- Founded: 2007
- AOC #: AAC/DG/OPS-09/04
- Hubs: Goma International Airport
- Fleet size: 6
- Website: busybeecongo.com

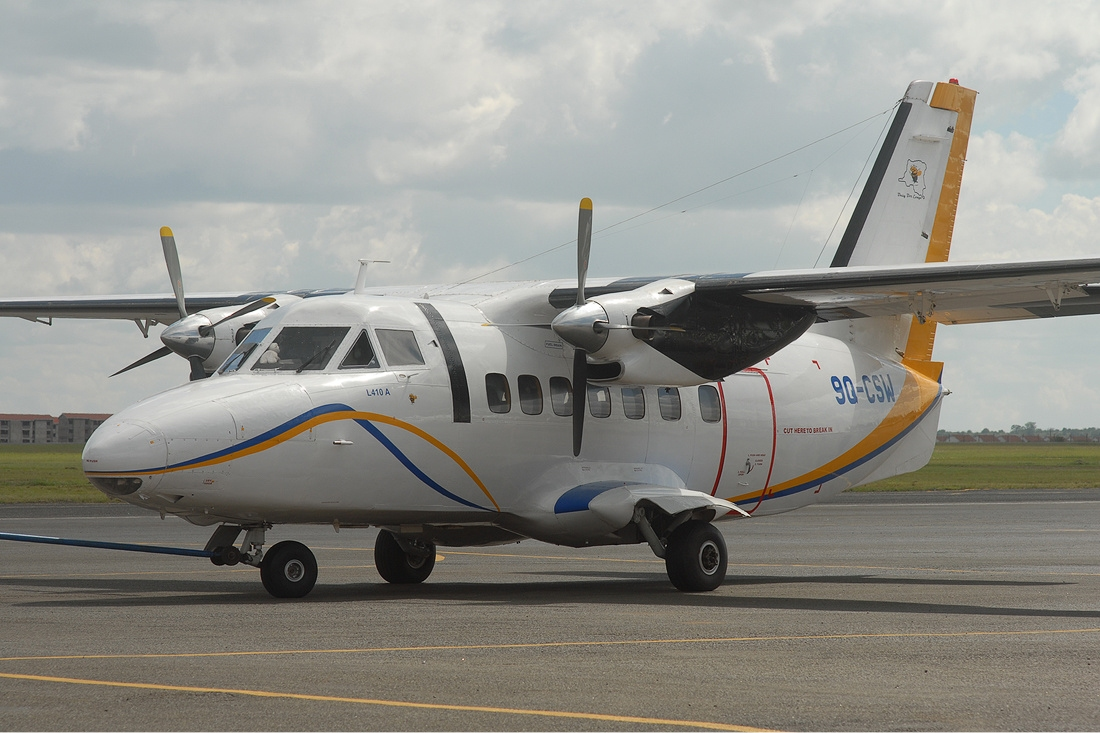
Busy Bee Congo Let L-410 Turbolet in 2008

Busy Bee Congo is a domestic charter airline which operates in the Democratic Republic of the Congo.

== History ==
Busy Bee Congo was established in the Democratic Republic of the Congo in 2007.

The airline is banned from operating within the European Union.

On 24 November 2019, a Busy Bee Congo Dornier 228 crashed shortly after takeoff at the Goma International Airport, killing 21 of the 22 occupants on board and an additional 6 on the ground. On 9 December, the Civil Aviation Authority grounded the Busy Bee Congo fleet. The airline was allowed to resume operations on 18 December.

== Fleet ==
=== Current fleet ===
As of July 2026, Busy Bee Congo operates the following aircraft:

Busy Bee Congo fleet
Aircraft	In service	Orders	Passengers	Notes
Fokker 50	4			
Dornier 228	2	—		
Total	6	—		

=== Former fleet ===
As of August 2025, Busy Bee Congo operated 1 Fokker 50 and 2 Dornier 228.

Busy Bee Congo also formerly operated the following aircraft:

Busy Bee Congo former fleet
Aircraft	Total	Introduced	Retired	Notes
Dornier 228-100	1	Unknown	Unknown	
Dornier 228-200	4	Unknown	Unknown	Two aircraft written off.
Let L-410 Turbolet	1	Unknown	Unknown	

== Accidents and incidents ==
- On 21 June 2016, a Busy Bee Congo Dornier 228-202 (registration: 9Q-CSL) was damaged in a runway excursion while landing at Goma International Airport. All the occupants onboard survived. The aircraft was written off.
- On 24 November 2019, a Busy Bee Congo Dornier 228-201 (registration: 9S-GNH) crashed 1 mile south of the Goma International Airport after takeoff. The crash killed 21 of the 22 people on board and additionally killed 6 people on the ground. The aircraft was written off.

== See also ==
- List of airlines of the Democratic Republic of the Congo
