= Bumba Airport =

Bumba Airport Aéroport de Bumba
- IATA: BMB; ICAO: FZFU

Summary
- Serves: Bumba
- Elevation AMSL: 1,184 ft / 361 m
- Coordinates: 2°10′58″N 22°28′54″E

Map
- Location of Bumba Airport in the DR Congo

Runways
Direction	Length		Surface
Direction	m	ft	Surface
12/29	1,700	5,577	Gravel
- Sources: GCM Google Earth

Bumba Airport

Bumba Airport (IATA: BMB, ICAO: FZFU) (French: Aéroport de Bumba) is an airport serving the Congo River port city of Bumba in Mongala Province, Democratic Republic of the Congo.

The Bumba (BBA) NDB is located 7.4 kilometres (4.6 mi) east of the runway.

== Airlines and destinations ==
Airlines	Destinations
Compagnie Africaine d'Aviation	Kisangani, Lisala

== See also ==
- Transport in the Democratic Republic of the Congo
- List of airports in the Democratic Republic of the Congo
