= Tribunal de Paix de Gombe =

Coordinates: 4°18′10″S 15°17′54″E

Gombe Peace Court
- French: Tribunal de Paix de Gombe

General information
- Type: Courthouse
- Architectural style: Modern
- Location: 6 Avenue de la Mission, Gombe, Kinshasa, Democratic Republic of the Congo

The Tribunal de Paix de Gombe (meaning "Gombe Peace Court") constitutes one of the eight peace courts located in Kinshasa, Democratic Republic of the Congo. It is situated at 6 Avenue de la Mission in the Gombe commune, next to the headquarters of the judicial police of the Public Prosecutor's Office.

The court hears both civil and criminal cases. Its jurisdiction follows the boundaries of the Gombe Court of Appeal, giving it authority over the communes of Gombe, Lingwala, Kinshasa, and Barumbu.

== History ==
The Tribunal de Paix de Gombe was created as part of legislative decree No. 68-248, issued on 10 September 1968. The law mandated the establishment of peace courts in every town and municipality, which replaced the former police courts and customary courts. In Kinshasa, this law was put into effect through Order No. 79-105, signed on 4 May 1979. The order established the locations and responsibilities of the new peace courts. Under Article 1, eight peace courts were created in Kinshasa, including the present-day Tribunal de Paix de Gombe.

== Organization ==
The Tribunal de Paix de Gombe is made up of several main sections. It includes a council of magistrates, which consists of a president, one or more judges, and at least two assessors. The court also has a council of clerks led by a head clerk, as provided under Articles 24 and 27 of the J.O.C. Code. In addition, the court has a secretariat that supports its daily operations. Although the law requires assessor judges to be part of the court, they are rarely seen during hearings and are seldom involved in court proceedings.

=== The Council of Magistrates ===
==== President, judges, and assessors ====
The president leads the court and manages its operations. The president is responsible for administrative and judicial duties, such as assigning cases to different chambers, scheduling hearings, organizing conservatory seizures, and calling plenary meetings. The president also has disciplinary authority over magistrates and plans work sessions. If the President is absent, the longest-serving judge, based on the order of appointment, takes over the role.

Judges interpret the law and apply it when hearing legal disputes. They make decisions based on legal principles and their own judgment.

Assessors are chosen to support a judge when a case involves customary law. They are appointed by the Minister of Justice from among local community leaders. Their role is to provide knowledge of local customs and traditions.

=== The Council of Clerks ===
==== Chief clerk and clerk's offices ====
The chief clerk is a career public servant who leads the court's administrative services and coordinates the work of the clerk's office. The chief clerk supports judges with various court duties, manages legal documents, and keeps records of judgments, appeals, and objections. The chief clerk also supervises the work of subordinate clerks and reports to the divisional clerk of the high court.

The clerk's penal office manages criminal cases brought by the public prosecutor or private parties. It keeps the penal register, submits case files so hearing dates can be scheduled, and makes sure all legal procedures are followed. The penal clerk also prepares written judgments, keeps records of appeals, and produces annual reports on criminal cases.

The clerk's civil office handles civil and family law matters, including adoption, guardianship, marriage, divorce, and other personal disputes. It records cases in the civil register, sends case files to the president so they can be assigned to the appropriate chamber, and schedules hearing dates.

The clerk's execution office carries out court decisions. It mainly handles seizures and other legal enforcement actions. The office also maintains the process server register and oversees the enforcement of judicial decisions.

The clerk's account office is led by an accountant who is responsible for preparing statistics, collecting court fees, and managing public and private funds. The accountant also works with the comptroller from the Direction Générale des Recettes Administratives et Domaniales (DGRAD).

The clerk's office of juvenile delinquency deals with cases involving minors under 16 years of age who come into conflict with the law. It maintains the juvenile case register and helps ensure that these cases are processed.

=== The Secretariat and judicial competence ===
The Secretariat supports the court's administrative functions, such as typing documents, managing protocols, and coordinating mail.

The court deals with criminal offenses that carry penalties of up to five years of penal servitude or fines. It also hears cases involving wandering, begging, and juvenile delinquency. Besides hearing these cases, the court can order preventive detention.

The court's territorial jurisdiction is based on where the offense was committed, where the accused lives, or where the accused was arrested. It may also hear cases involving co-offenders and accomplices when the related offenses fall within its jurisdiction.

The court hears cases involving people who do not have jurisdictional privileges. A Judge of the Peace has the authority to order preventive detention, while preventive detention for individuals under the jurisdiction of the Supreme Court must be approved by the Supreme Court.

The court applies the Family Code when hearing civil and family law cases. It also has the authority to approve detention orders, authorize conservatory seizures regardless of the value of the dispute, and enforce authentic legal documents.

For civil matters, the case must be heard by the court with jurisdiction over the defendant's place of residence.

The court is competent to judge any individual without exception in civil matters.
