= Kata Air Transport Flight 007 =

2008 aviation incident in Moldova

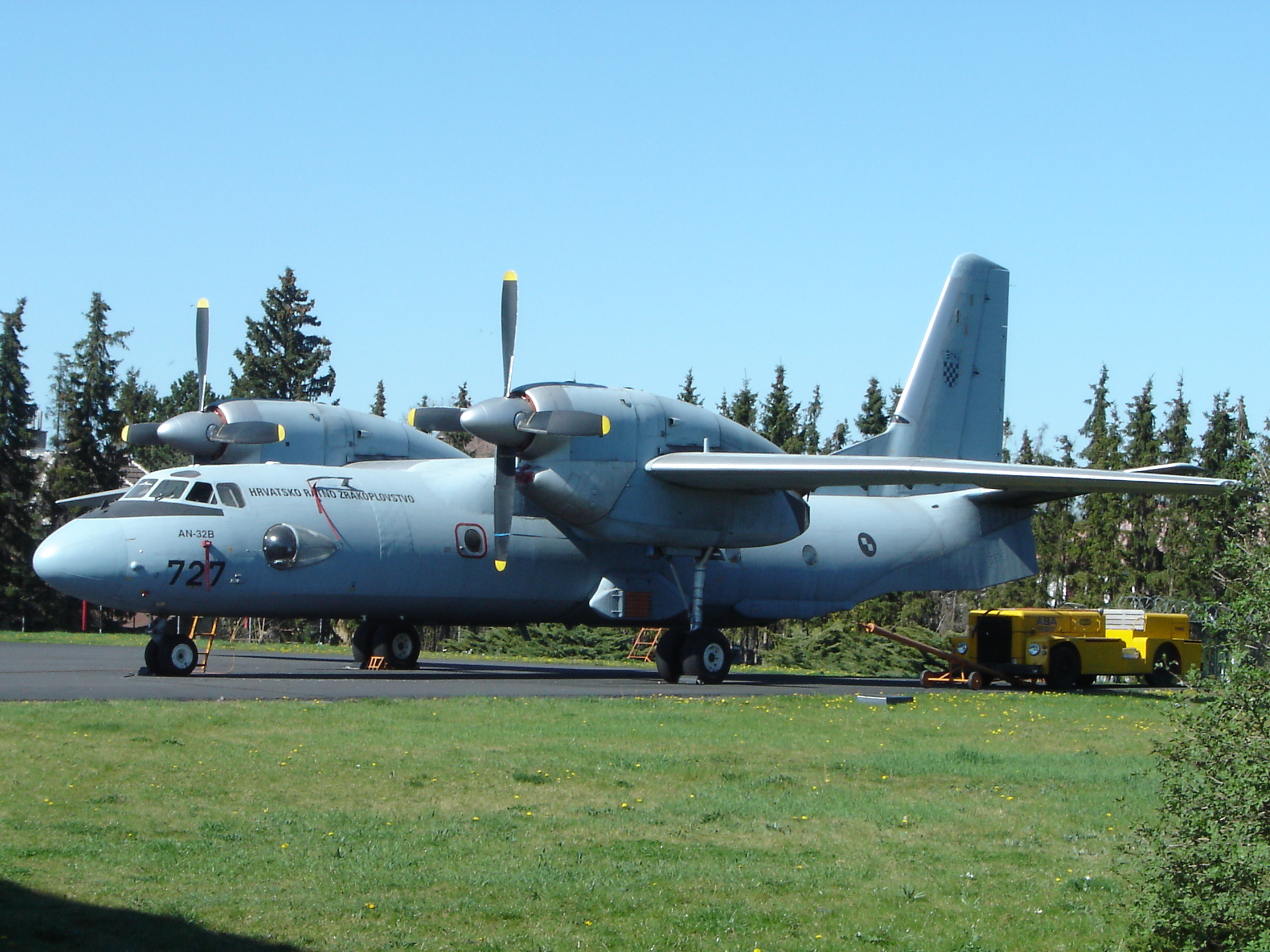
- An Antonov An-32, like the one involved in the crash

Accident
- Date: 11 April 2008 22:15 UTC
- Summary: Engine failure
- Site: near Băcioi, Chișinău, Moldova; 46°55′38″N 28°53′12″E

Aircraft
- Aircraft type: Antonov An-32
- Operator: Kata Air Transport
- Registration: ST-AZL
- Flight origin: Vienna International Airport
- 2nd stopover: Chișinău International Airport; KIV/LUKK
- 3rd stopover: Antalya Airport, Turkey
- Destination: Khartoum, Sudan
- Passengers: 0
- Crew: 8
- Fatalities: 8
- Injuries: 0
- Survivors: 0

Kata Air Transport Flight 007 was an international flight from Vienna to Khartoum, with stopovers on Chișinău and Antalya. On April 11, 2008, the Antonov An-32 (NATO reporting name "Cline") crashed short of the runway, near Băcioi. All eight people were killed.

Early reports indicated that the Ukraine-built An-32 "Cline" had engine problems and turned back to Chișinău International Airport, Moldova. The flight from Vienna had refuelled and was bound for Khartoum, Sudan via Antalya, Turkey with a Moldovan crew of eight.

The aircraft had undergone maintenance at Chișinău. It crashed at 22:15 local time, or 20:15 UTC. Moldovan authorities requested Russian assistance with the black box records. Novosti reported that the crew was four Russians and four Moldovans, but it was later determined that there were four Ukrainian and four Moldovan citizens.

The aircraft was later announced as belonging to Kata Air Transport of Sudan and as having crashed close to the village of Băcioi, Moldova carrying 2.3 tonnes of vegetable oil.
