= Antonov An-32 =

Airliner and military tactical transport aircraft by Antonov

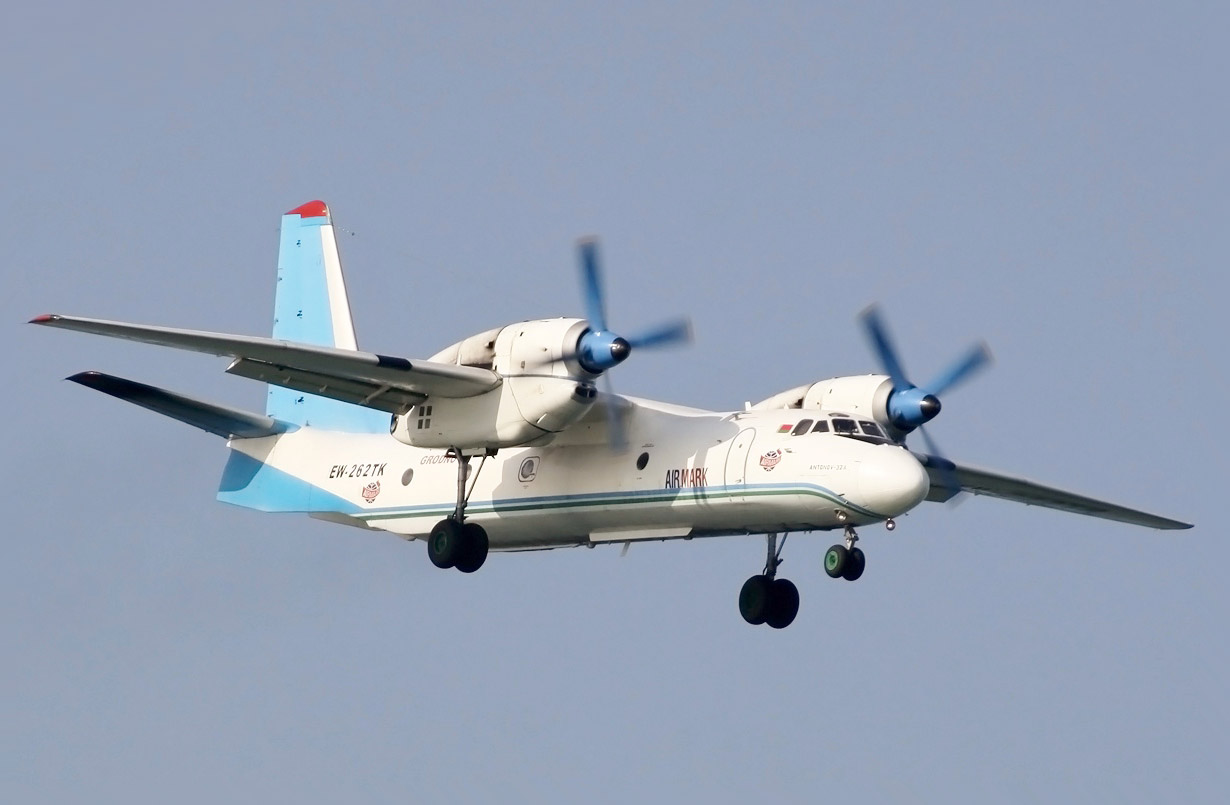
- An-32 of AirMark

General information
- Type: Military transport aircraft
- National origin: Soviet Union/Russia/Ukraine
- Manufacturer: Antonov Serial Production Plant
- Designer: Antonov
- Status: In service
- Primary users: Indian Air Force National Air Force of Angola; Sri Lanka Air Force; Ukrainian Air Force
- Number built: 373

History
- Manufactured: 1982–2012
- First flight: 9 July 1976
- Developed from: Antonov An-26
- Developed into: Antonov/Taqnia An-132

The Antonov An-32 (NATO reporting name: Cline) is a turboprop twin-engined military transport aircraft. Its first flight was in July 1976 and was displayed at the 1977 Paris Air Show. A variant of the An-24, it was given upgraded equipment and more powerful Ivchenko AI-20 engines, and is oriented towards flying in adverse weather conditions. The aircraft was produced from 1980 to 2012, and remains in service. It is the fourth member of the Antonov An-24 family, succeeding the An-24, An-30 and An-26, and coming before the cancelled An-132.

== Design and development ==
The An-32 is essentially a re-engined An-26. It is designed to withstand adverse weather conditions better than the standard An-26. Announced at the May 1977 Paris Air Show, the An-32 is distinguished from its predecessor by engines raised 1.5 m above the wing in order to avoid foreign object damage on rough, unprepared airstrips.

The type features high-lift wings with automatic leading-edge slats, large triple-slotted trailing edge flaps and an enlarged tailplane and a very large increase in power, giving improved take-off performance and service ceiling. The high placement of the engine nacelles above the wing allowed for larger diameter propellers, which are driven by 5,100 hp rated Ivchenko AI-20 turboprop engines, providing almost twice the power of the An-26's AI-24 powerplants.

Production from the Government Aircraft Factory in Kyiv, has included 123 aircraft for the Indian Air Force, which ordered the aircraft under strong foreign relations between then USSR leader Leonid Brezhnev and then India leader Indira Gandhi.

The majority of production has been for the Russian and Ukrainian Air Forces, with around 40 per year being built during the late 1980s to early 1990s. The estimated price for a modernised An-32 version is 15 million US dollars.

The last An-32 was produced in 2012.

=== Production data ===
Production
Total	1976	1982	1983	1984	1985	1986	1987	1988	1989	1990	1991	1992	1993	1994	1995	1996	2005	2007	2008	2010	2011	2012
373	1	1	5	29	31	26	54	28	48	11	49	47	10	4	8	5	2	1	4	1	3	5

== Operational history ==
The An-32 has outstanding takeoff characteristics in hot and high conditions, up to 55 °C (131 °F) and 4,500 m (14,800 ft) elevation, and is suitable for use as a medium tactical military transport roles as well as commercial roles. Operating as a cargo transport over the short and medium range air routes, the An-32 is suitable for air-dropping cargo, passenger carrying, medevac, firefighting, skydiving or paratrooping roles.

The An-32 entered service in the 1980s and served with the air forces of Ukraine, Russia, Bangladesh Air Force, the Indian Air Force, the Iraqi Air Force, the Mexican Air Force and the Sudanese Air Force.

In 2014, the Iraqi Air Force used its An-32B as bombers against the ISIS in response to the Islamic State invasion of Iraq.

== Variants ==
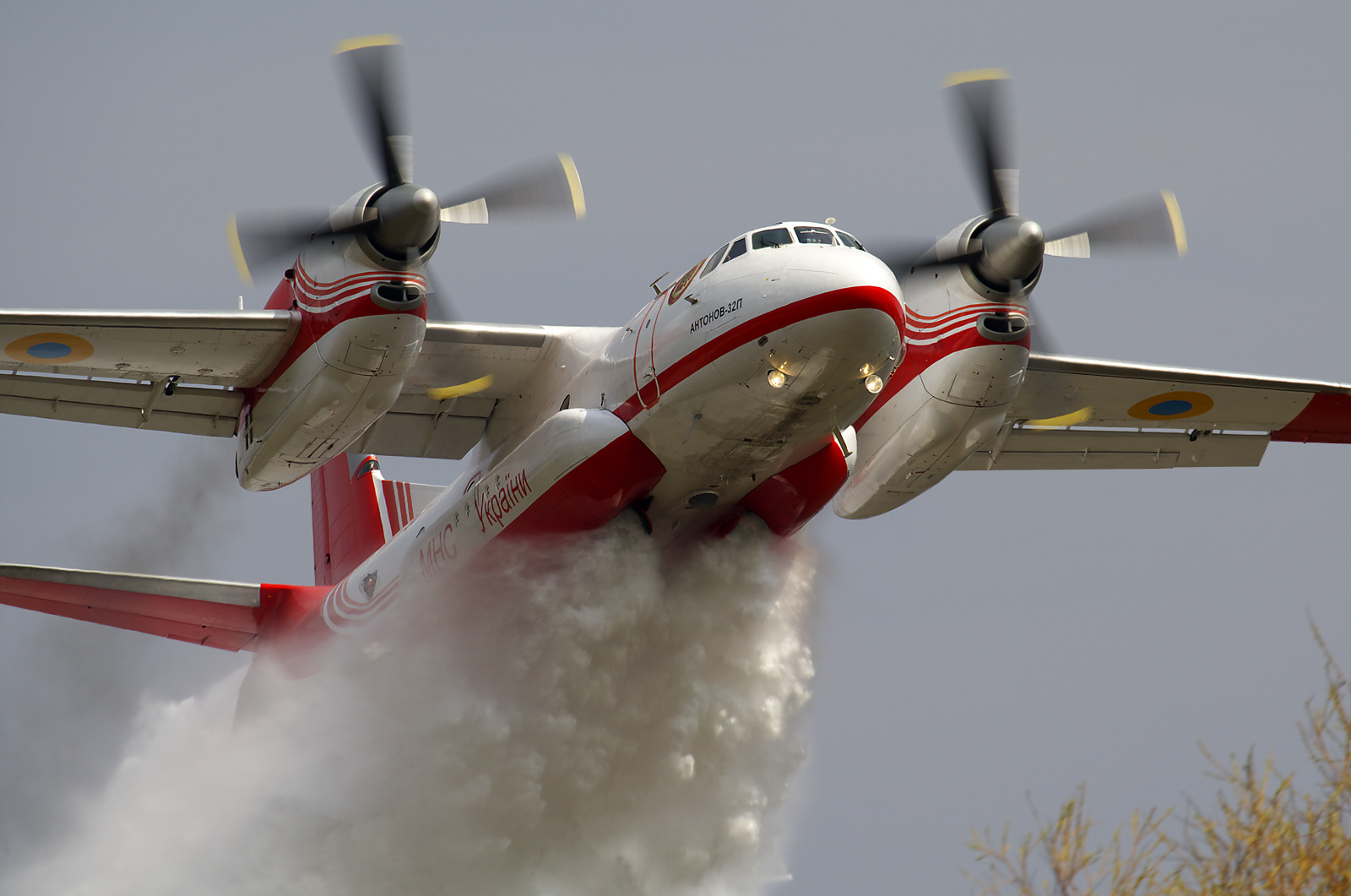
A State Emergency Service of Ukraine An-32 firefighting aircraft dumps water on a forest fire.

- An-32 : Twin-engined transport aircraft
- An-32A : The first civil variant, the majority of the 36 aircraft built were delivered to various government factory enterprises, for use in transporting assemblies between plants.
- An-32B : Improved version
- An-32B-100 : Modernised version of the An-32B. Maximum takeoff weight (MTOW) increased to 28.5 tons, payload increased to 7.5 tons.
- An-32B-110 : New avionics allowing aircraft to be operated by two crew members. Metric (Russian) avionics variant.
- An-32B-120 : Imperial (non-Russian) avionics variant of An-32B-110.
- An-32B-300 : Version fitted with Rolls-Royce AE 2100 turboprop engines, providing 4,600 hp each.
- An-32LL (Letayushchaya Laboratoriya flying laboratory): The An-32 first prototype was equipped with a large SV-36P eight-bladed propeller and D-236 engine on the port side for testing, in place of the standard engine and propeller. The increased noise produced by the experimental installation (115-120 dB) outweighed the modest gains in performance.
- An-32MP : Marine Patrol version.
- An-32P Firekiller : Aerial firefighting version. Special category type certificate granted on 10 March 1995. A total of eight tons of liquid can be discharged from the two external tanks simultaneously or one after the other. Drops are conducted at 40–50 m above ground level and 240 to 260 km/h. Can be used as a cargo aircraft when not fighting fires.
- An-32V-200 : A tactical transport/cargo aircraft outgrowth from the An-32B-100, with more modern avionics allowing two crew operation. Intended for export; despite reasonable interest few have been sold.
- An-32 RE : Modernised version of the An-32B. MTOW increased to 28.5 tons, payload increased to 7.5 tons. New avionics.

== Operators ==
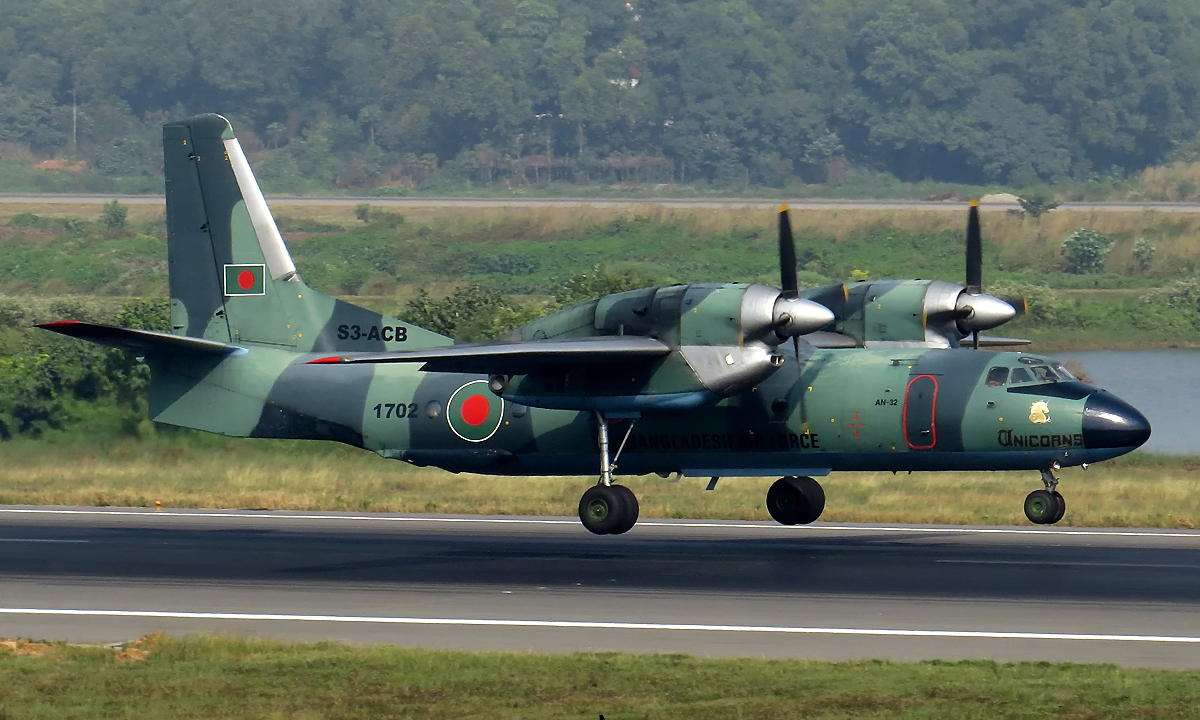
Bangladesh Air Force Antonov An-32 landing

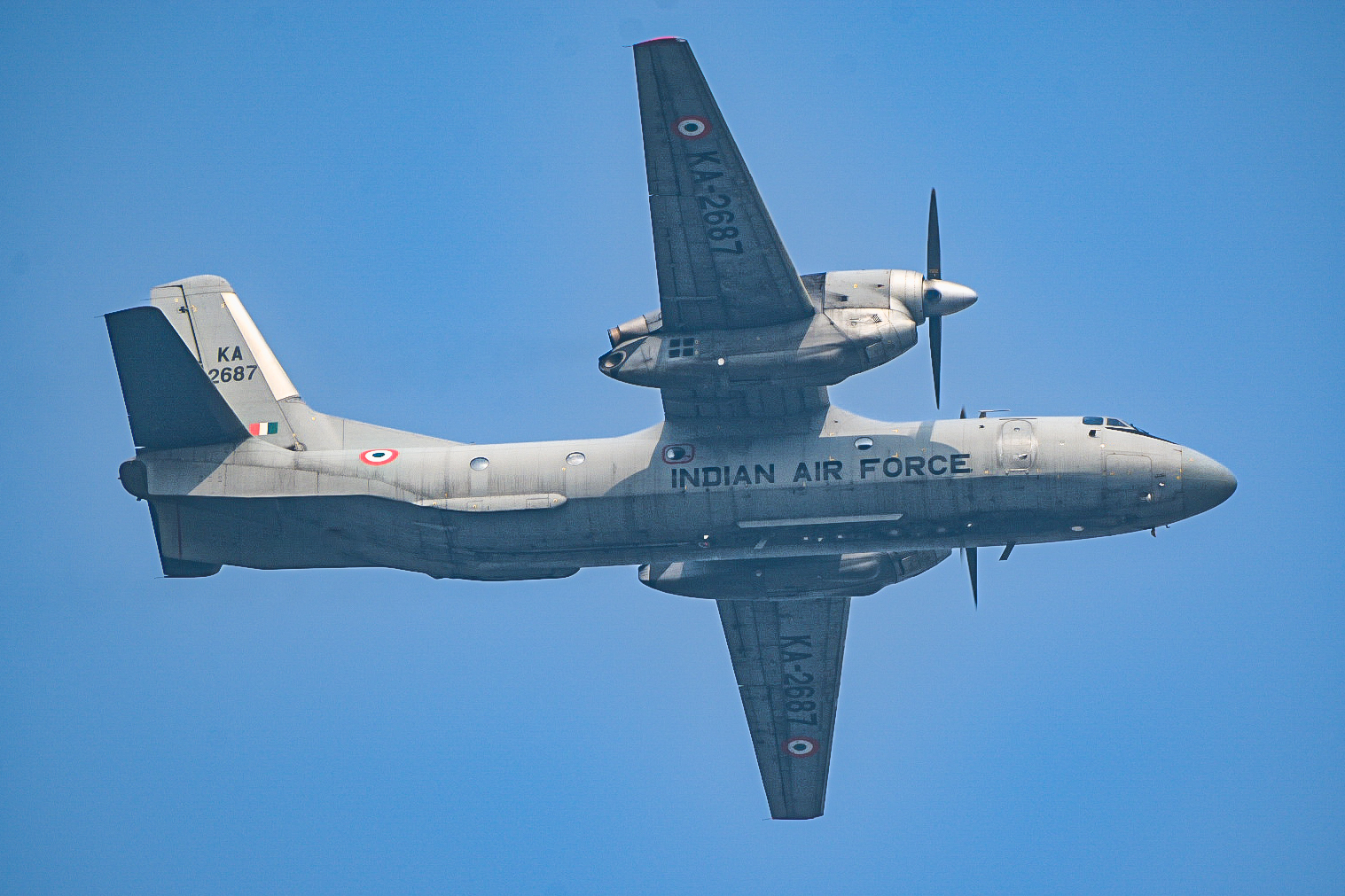
The IAF's Antonov An-32 transport aircraft, during the Republic Day Flypast 2024.

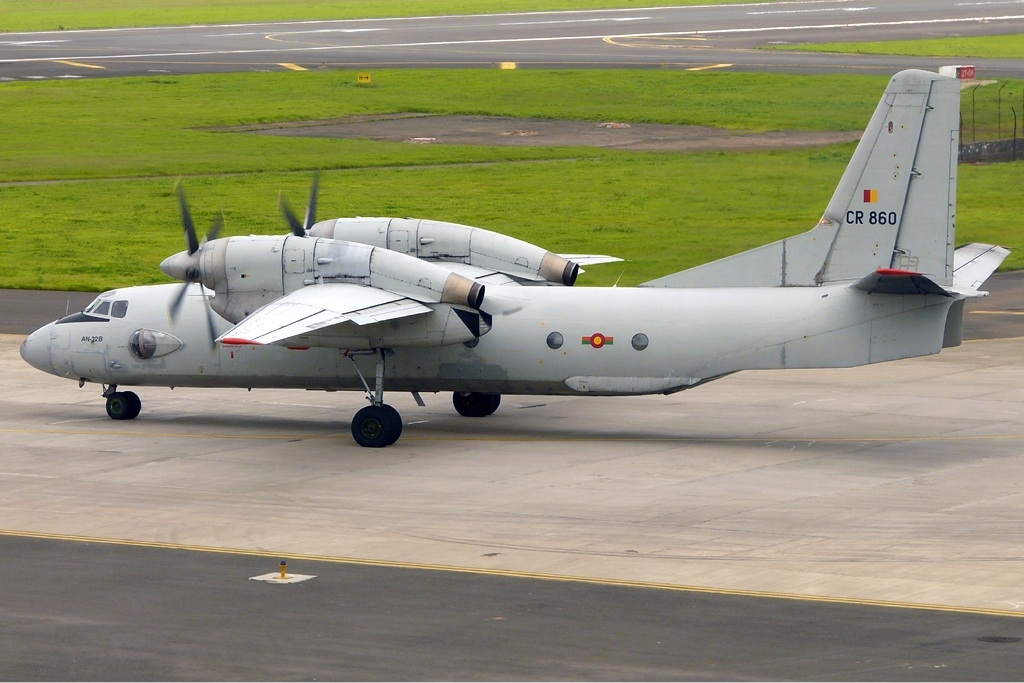
Sri Lanka Air Force Antonov An-32B.

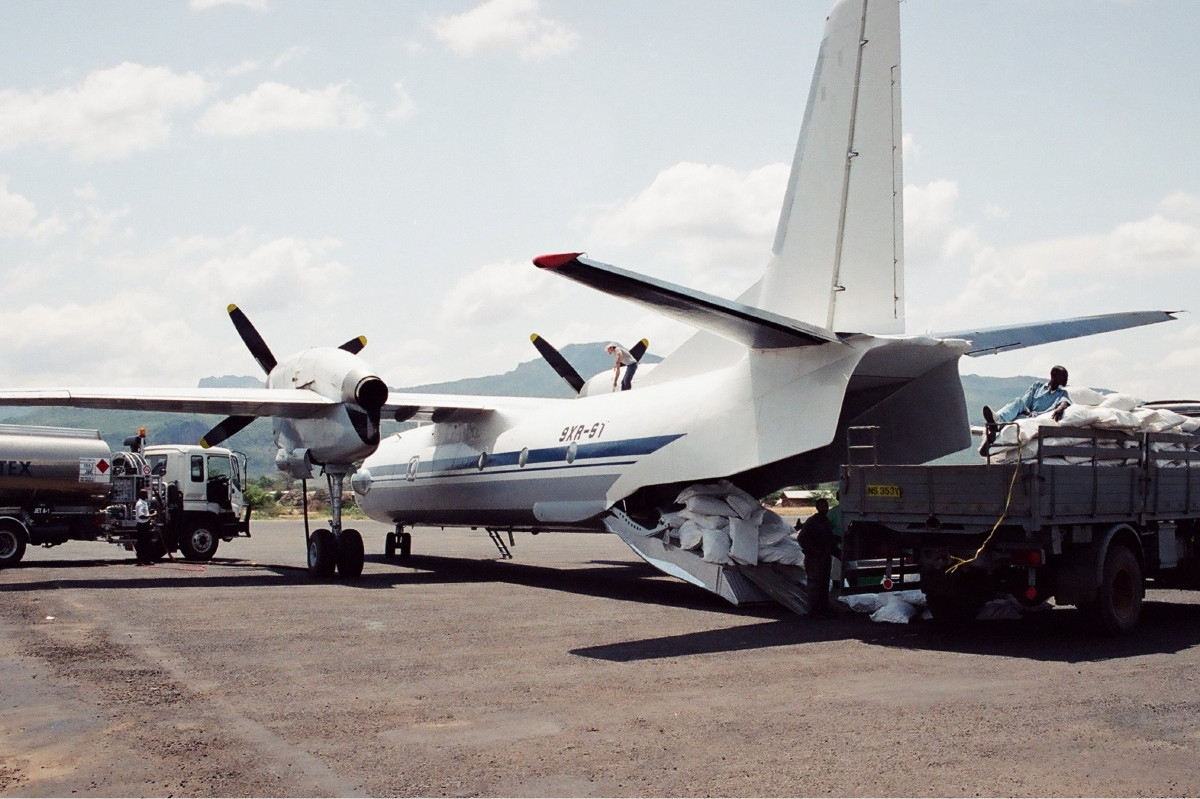
Sun Air Charter An-32 at Lokichogio Airport.

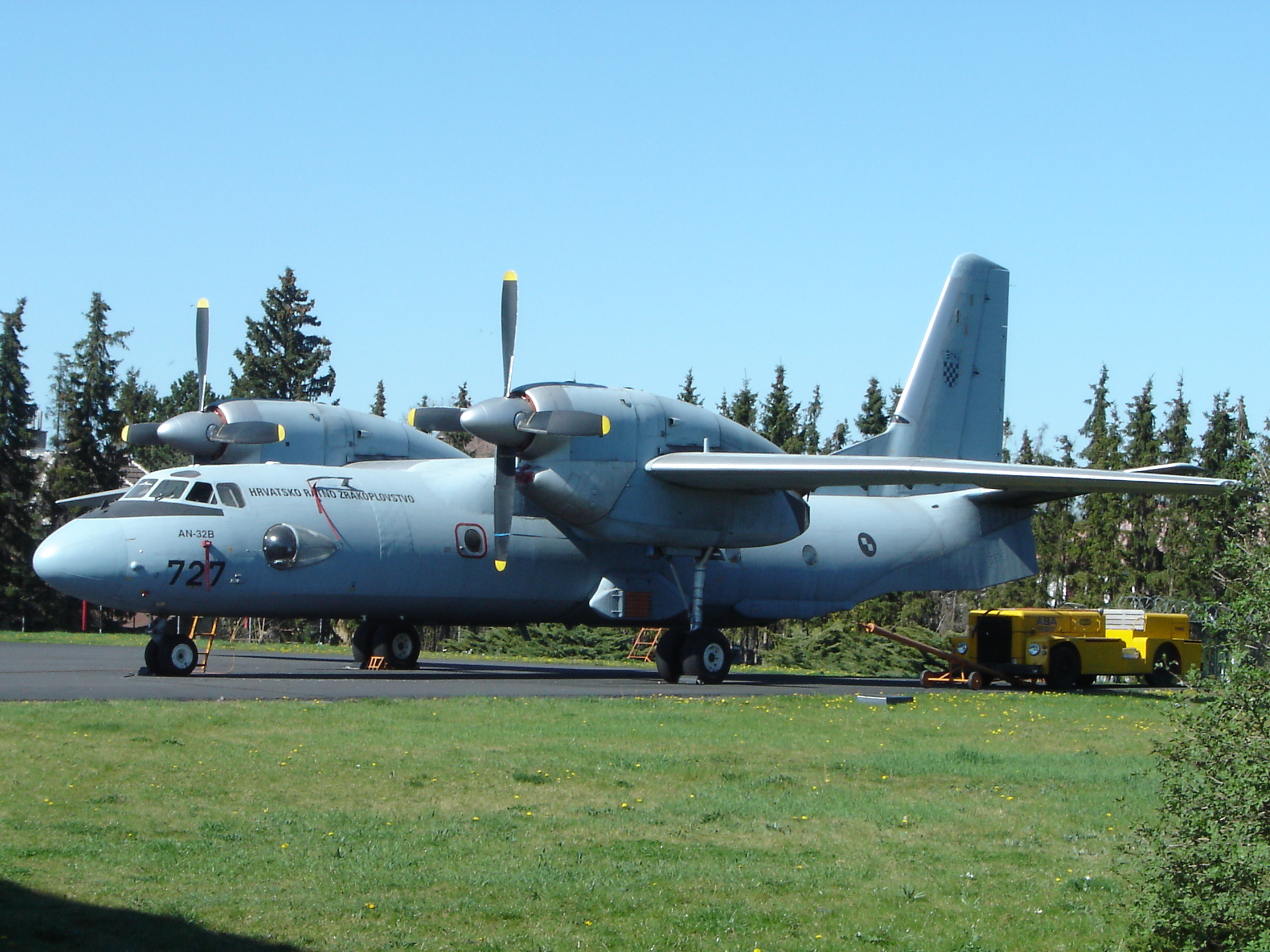
Antonov An-32B of the Croatian Air Force.

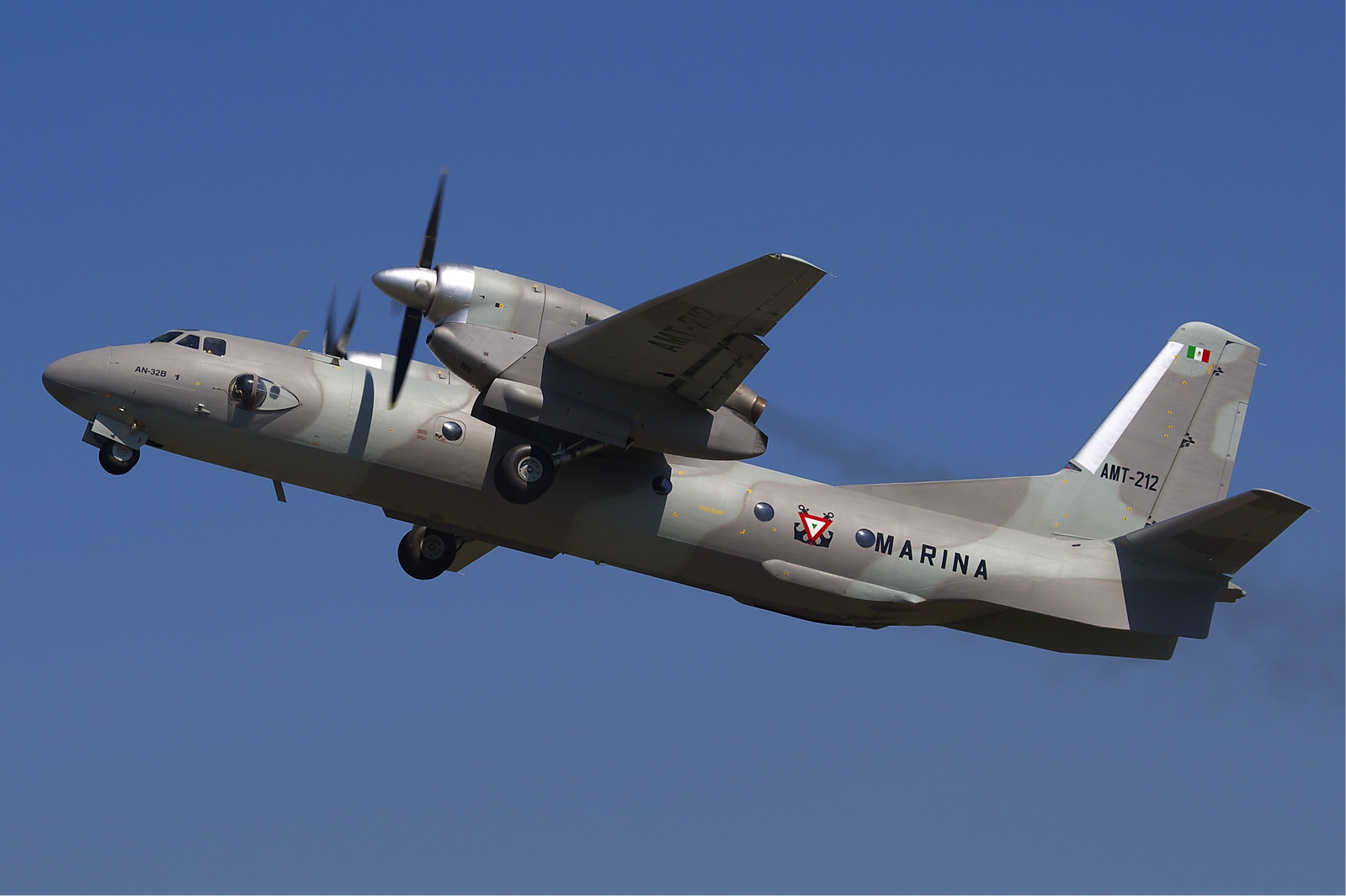
Mexican Navy Antonov An-32B taking off at Kyiv-Zhuliany in 2009.

=== Military operators ===
Besides aircraft in service in the Ukrainian and Russian Air Forces, more than 240 An-32 aircraft are being operated in various countries around the world.

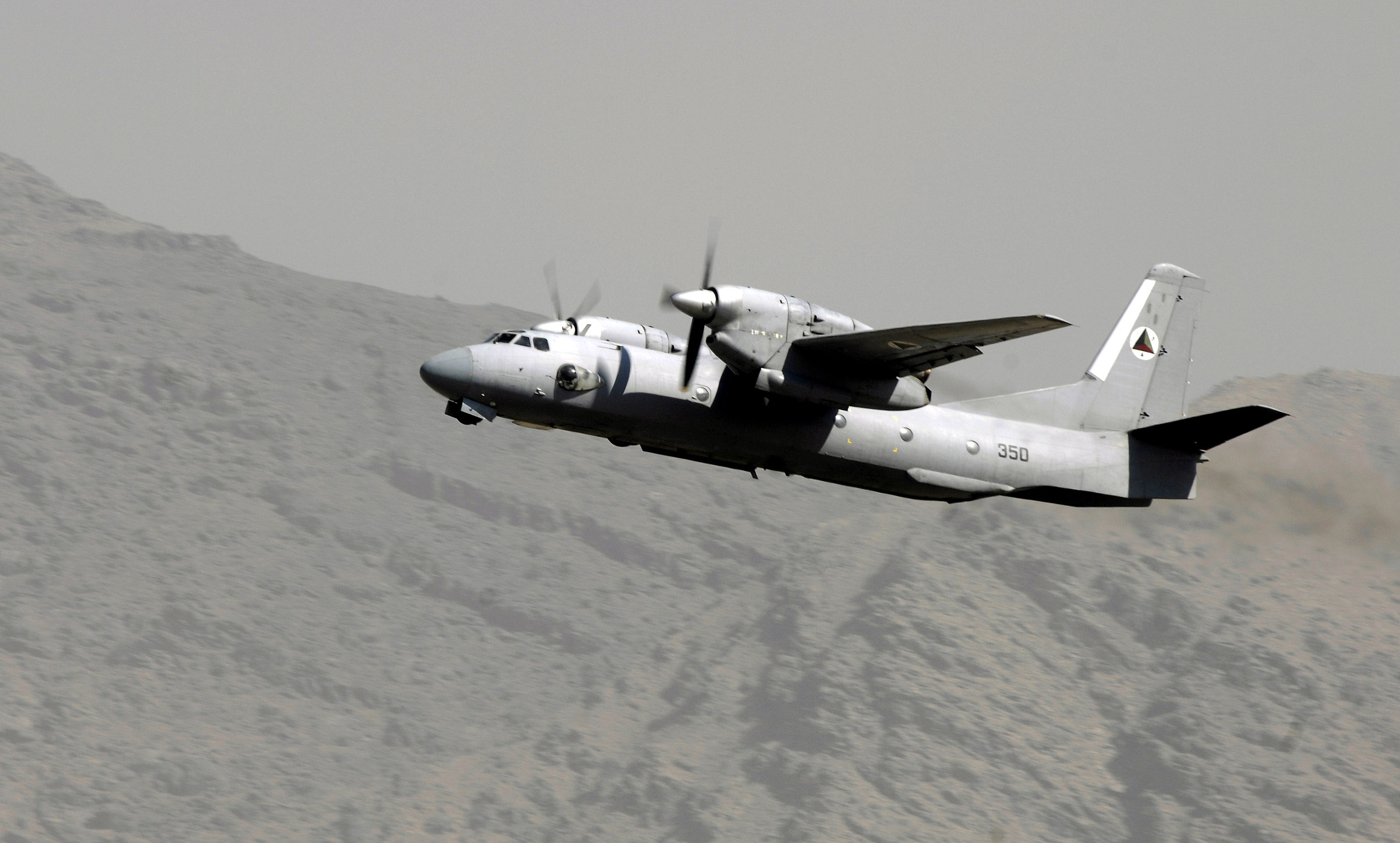
An Antonov An-32 of the Afghan Air Force

Afghanistan

- At least six were delivered to the Afghan Air Force from 1987. Three were used by the Taliban Air Force. -2 Units Active in 2024.

Angola

- People's Air and Air Defence Force of Angola Operates seven An-32.

Bangladesh

- Bangladesh Air Force: Three aircraft received and currently in service with the 3 Squadron 'Unicorns'. Two An-32B & one An-32C. Overhauled and upgraded with life extension by SE PLANT 410 CA of Ukraine.

Colombia

- Colombian National Army Aviation: Two An-32

Republic of the Congo

- Congolese Air Force: 2 in service

Ethiopia

- Ethiopian Air Force: 1 in service

India

- Indian Air Force: Bought 125 aircraft, ~105 are still in service. Entire fleet is undergoing modernization; 35 upgraded An-32s have been delivered by Ukrspetsexport. The upgrades include modern avionics equipment, new oxygen systems and improved crew seats. The remaining aircraft are being upgraded in India. These will be replaced with the Medium Transport Aircraft (MTA) programme. As of 2024, IAF has plans to upgrade another 60 An-32s within India by FY2028-29, at the rate of 15 per overhaul cycle, led by 1 Base Repair Depot, Kanpur and 3 Base Repair Depot, Chandigarh.

Iraq

- Iraqi Air Force: Six An-32B delivered from Ukraine between November 2011 and October 2012, initially used by the 23rd Squadron alongside C-130s. In May 2013, the 33rd Squadron was created to operate Iraq's An-32 fleet.

Mexico

- Mexican Air Force: One An-32.
- Mexican Naval Aviation: One An-32B.

Peru

- Peruvian Air Force Three An-32
- Peruvian Army Two An-32B
- Peruvian Naval Aviation One An-32B formerly from Hungary

Sri Lanka

- Sri Lanka Air Force Four An-32

Sudan

- Sudanese Air Force Six An-32

=== Former military operators ===
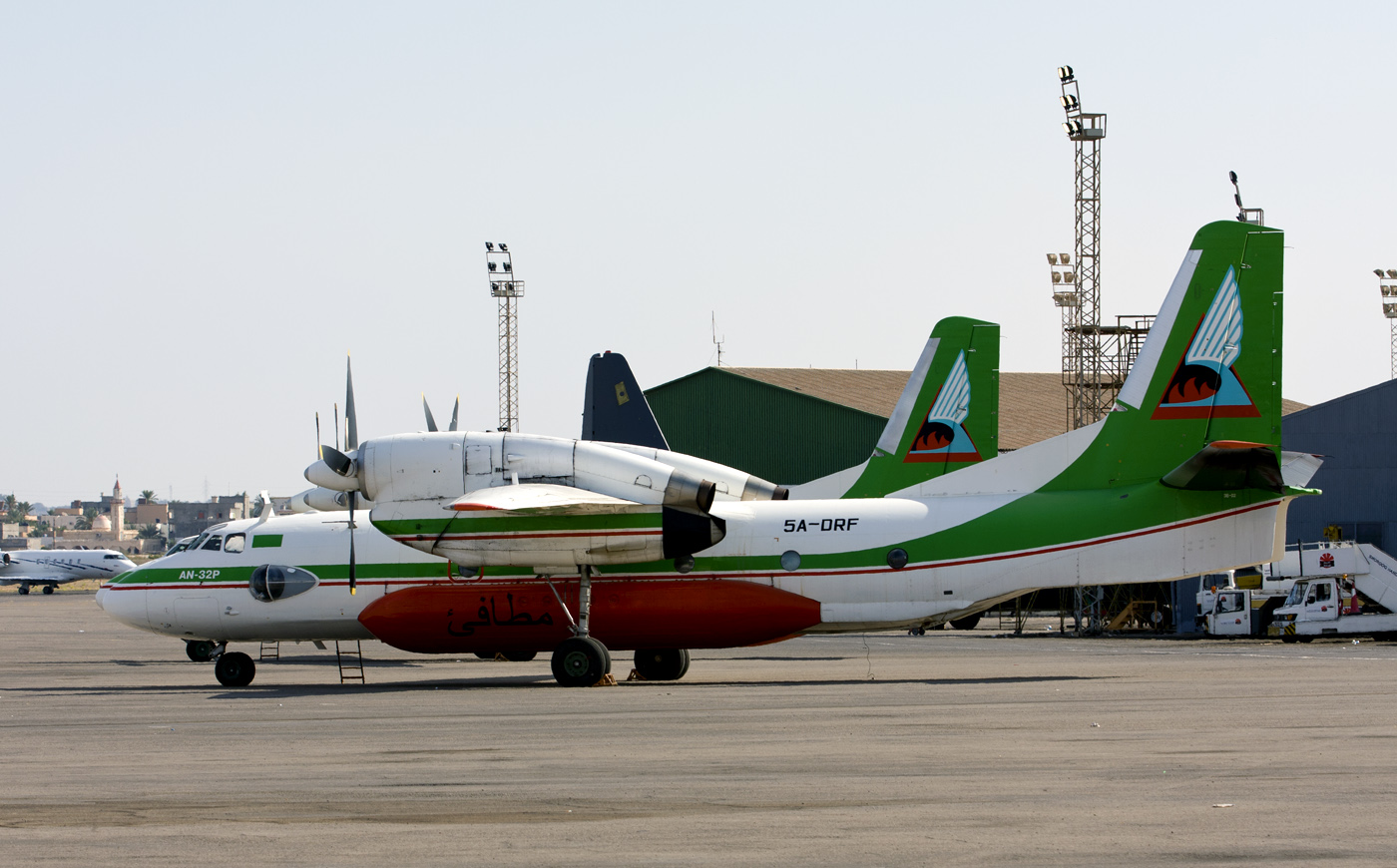
A Libyan An-32 in 2009

Armenia

- Armenian Air Force One An-32

Croatia

- Croatian Air Force: Operated two An-32B's. Modernized in 2004 and subsequently retired and put up for sale in 2014 after being declared redundant. Both were transferred to Ukraine in 2023/24.

Ivory Coast

- Military of Ivory Coast one An-32

Equatorial Guinea

- Air Force of Equatorial Guinea One An-32 lost in crash in 2008.

Jordan

- Jordanian Air Force

Libya

- Libyan Air Force

Rwanda

- Military of Rwanda

Tanzania

=== Civil operators ===
In July 2016, a total of 25 Antonov An-32 aircraft remained in airline service. The largest operator was Aero Transporte S.A (ATSA) of Peru with four aircraft. Some 16 other airlines operated smaller numbers of the type.

== Accidents and incidents ==
- On 25 March 1986, an Indian Air Force An-32 disappeared over the Arabian Sea on a delivery flight from the Soviet Union (via Muscat, Oman.) No trace was ever found of the aircraft or its three crew and four passengers.
- On 15 July 1990, an Indian Air Force An-32 crashed in the Ponmudi Mountain Range while en route from Tambaram Air Force Station to Thiruvananthapuram in India, killing all 5 on board.
- On 8 January 1996, an An-32 freighter crashed into a crowded marketplace in Kinshasa, Zaire, resulting in the deaths of approximately 237 people on the ground. The crew attempted to abort the takeoff at Kinshasa-N'Dolo Airport after the aircraft failed to gain height. Four of the six crew members survived. Overloading was cited as a possible cause.
- On 12 February 1998, a Sudanese Air Force An-32 carrying 51 on board, overrun the runway after landing, crashing on river, killing 26 of the 57 on board, among them several of the country's most senior government leaders, including the Vice-President Zubair Mohamed Salih.
- On 28 March 1998, a Peruvian Air Force An-32 carrying the dual civil/military registration OB-1389/FAP-388 and inbound from Tumbes evacuating 50 people stranded by El Niño-driven floods had an engine failure while approaching Piura. As the aircraft was overloaded, the pilot could not maintain height and the An-32 struck three houses of a nearby shantytown and crashed into a canal. While the crew of five survived, 21 passengers died plus one person on the ground.
- On 26 August 2007, a Great Lakes Business Company An-32B carrying nine tons of minerals, 12 passengers, and a crew of three experienced engine trouble after takeoff from Kongolo Airport, Kongolo, Democratic Republic of the Congo, and crashed short of the runway while attempting to return to the airport, killing 14 of the 15 people on board.
- On 11 April 2008, Kata Air Transport Flight 7, a An-32, crashed during return the airport caused engine failure, killing all 8 on board.
- On 10 June 2009, an Indian Air Force An-32 carrying 13 people crashed shortly after it took off from Mechuka in Arunachal Pradesh, a state bordering China. All 13 people on board were reported to have been killed. Soon after the crash, India agreed a $US400 million deal with Ukraine for an An-32 fleet upgrade. This upgrade as reported will extend the life of these transport aircraft by nearly 15 years.
- On 12 December 2014, a Sri Lanka Air Force An-32 carrying five people crashed on approach to land at Ratmalana Airport after taking off from Katunayaka Bandaranayake International Airport. The pilot, co-pilot and two of the aircrew were killed in the crash and the fifth crew member suffered critical injuries and died after six days from the accident due to his injuries.
- On 22 July 2016, an Indian Air Force An-32 (Registration - K2743) travelling from Chennai to Port Blair went missing above the Bay of Bengal with 29 people on board. It left the Tambaram Air Base near Chennai at 8.30 am and disappeared from radar tracking at 9.12 am, 280 km east of Chennai. On 12 January 2024, the Ministry of Defence (India) announced that the wreckage of the missing aircraft had been found in a recent search operation in collaboration with the National Institute of Ocean Technology. The wreckage was found at a depth of 3,400 metres (11,200 ft) and at a distance of 140 nautical miles (310 km) from the coast of Chennai. It was found by a ship on a research mission in the nearby areas and stumbled upon during calibration of Instruments.
- On 3 October 2018 a Sudan Air Force An-32 collided with an Antonov An-30 (also of the Sudan Air Force) at Khartoum International Airport.
- On 3 June 2019, an Indian Air Force An-32 went missing near Arunachal Pradesh shortly after taking off from Jorhat Air Base in Assam in northeastern India. The wreckage of the aircraft was found in Arunachal Pradesh eight days later with the 13 on board found dead.
- On 30 March 2026, an An-32 of the Iraqi Air Force was destroyed at Baghdad International Airport by an Iranian-backed Iraqi militia, the Popular Mobilization Forces, using Shaheb-12 missiles.
- On 13 June 2026, an An-32 of the Indian Air Force crashed while landing at Jorhat, Assam, India, killing 5 IAF personnel with one survivor.

== Specifications (An-32) ==
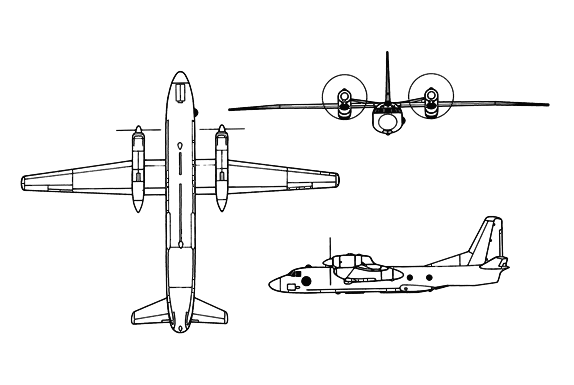
Orthographic projection of the Antonov An-32.

Data from Jane's All The World's Aircraft 1988–89

General characteristics

- Crew: 4
- Capacity: 42 paratroopers/50 passengers/24 Casualties on stretcher with three medical personnel / 6,700 kg (14,771 lb) max payload
- Length: 23.78 m (78 ft 0 in)
- Wingspan: 29.2 m (95 ft 10 in)
- Height: 8.75 m (28 ft 8 in)
- Wing area: 75 m^{2} (810 sq ft)
- Empty weight: 16,800 kg (37,038 lb)
- Max takeoff weight: 27,000 kg (59,525 lb)
- Powerplant: 2 × ZMKB Progress AI-20DM turboprop engines, 3,812 kW (5,112 hp) each
- Propellers: 4-bladed constant speed propellers

Performance

- Maximum speed: 530 km/h (330 mph, 290 kn)
- Cruise speed: 470 km/h (290 mph, 250 kn)
- Range: 2,500 km (1,600 mi, 1,300 nmi) with 3,700 kg (8,160 lb) payload, no reserves
- Service ceiling: 9,500 m (31,200 ft)

== See also ==
Related development

- Antonov An-26
- Antonov/Taqnia An-132

Aircraft of comparable role, configuration, and era

- EADS CASA C-295
- Alenia C-27J

Related lists

- List of military aircraft of the Soviet Union and the CIS
