= Kongolo Airport =

Kongolo Airport Aéroport de Kongolo
- IATA: KOO; ICAO: FZRQ

Summary
- Serves: Kongolo, DR Congo
- Elevation AMSL: 1,850 ft (560 m)
- Coordinates: 05°23′40″S 026°59′25″E

Map
- Location of Kongolo Airport in the DR Congo

Runways
Direction	Length		Surface
Direction	m	ft	Surface
11/29	1,900	6,234	Gravel
- Sources: GCM Google Map

Kongolo Airport (IATA: KOO, ICAO: FZRQ) is an airport serving the Lualaba River city of Kongolo, Democratic Republic of the Congo.

== Airlines and destinations ==
Airlines	Destinations
Compagnie Africaine d'Aviation	Bukavu, Goma, Kalemie

== Accidents and incidents ==
After experiencing engine trouble about ten minutes after takeoff from Kongolo Airport on 26 August 2007, an Antonov An-32B operated by the Great Lakes Business Company struck trees and crashed 3 kilometres (1.9 mi) short of the runway while attempting to return to the airport, killing 14 of the 15 people on board.

== See also ==
- Transport in the Democratic Republic of the Congo
- List of airports in the Democratic Republic of the Congo
