= Great Lakes Business Company =

Airline of the Democratic Republic of the Congo

IATA	ICAO	Call sign
—	—	—
- Founded: 2001
- Ceased operations: 2009
- Hubs: Kinshasa
- Focus cities: Kongolo
- Headquarters: Kinshasa, Democratic Republic of the Congo
- Key people: Douglas Mpamo

Great Lakes Business Company was an airline owner/operator in the Democratic Republic of Congo.

They are on the List of air carriers banned in the European Union as well as a UN list of businesses targeted by sanctions in regard of the transport of arms and ammunition. The company is owned by Douglas Mpamo, according to the UN.

== Fleet ==
The UN report lists:

- 1 – Boeing 727
- 1 – Antonov An-12
- 3 – Antonov An-32
- 1 – Let Turbolet among GLBC's aircraft they found in Goma.

== Accidents and incidents ==
- 26 August 2007 - In Kongolo, Democratic Republic of the Congo, 14 of 15 aboard died when an overloaded Antonov An-32B (NATO reporting name "Curl", registration 9Q-CAC) owned by Agefreco Air and operated by the Great Lakes Business Company crashed short of the runway while attempting to return to the airport after experiencing engine problems. The tin trade had become lucrative and violent when the use of lead solder was phased out of electronics for environmental reasons, and the aircraft was overloaded with nine tons of cassiterite (tin ore) and other minerals in addition to its 12 passengers and three-person crew of two Ukrainians and one Russian. The company's licence was suspended on 29 August 2007, along with the airport manager and the Kinshasa director of civil aviation, pending an inquiry.

== See also ==
- Transport in the Democratic Republic of the Congo
