= Lisala Airport =

Lisala Airport Aéroport de Lisala
- IATA: LIQ; ICAO: FZGA

Summary
- Airport type: Public
- Operator: Government
- Location: Lisala, Democratic Republic of the Congo
- Elevation AMSL: 1,509 ft (460 m)
- Coordinates: 2°10′15″N 21°29′50″E

Map
- Location in the Democratic Republic of the Congo

Runways
Direction	Length		Surface
Direction	m	ft	Surface
05/23	2,195	7,201	Gravel
- Source: WAD GCM

Lisala Airport (IATA: LIQ, ICAO: FZGA) is an airport serving the Congo River city of Lisala, the capital of Mongala Province of the Democratic Republic of the Congo. The runway is on the northwestern side of the city.

== Facilities ==
The airport is at an elevation of 1,509 feet (460 m) above mean sea level. It has one runway designated 05/23 with a gravel surface measuring 2,195 by 50 metres (7,201 ft × 164 ft).

The Lisala non-directional beacon (Ident: LIS) is located 0.4 nautical miles (0.7 km) south-southeast of the airport.

== Airlines and destinations ==
Airlines	Destinations
Compagnie Africaine d'Aviation	Bumba, Gemena
