= Lodja =

Remote mining town in the Democratic Republic of the Congo

- Town
- Location within Democratic Republic of the Congo
- Coordinates: 3°31′21.91″S 23°35′49.52″E

Population (2016)
  - Total: 68,244

Lodja is a remote town in the Sankuru (formerly Kasaï-Oriental) province in central Democratic Republic of the Congo. It is serviced by the Lodja Airport which is about 7 kilometres (4.3 mi) from town. Lodja is a hub for both rice production in the province and diamond mining in the country. Lodja is and has been home to many Tetela.

== History ==
Lodja Hospital was built in the 1950s by Belgian colonizers but was abandoned unfinished when the Republic of the Congo declared independence in 1960. The town was captured by rebel forces during the Second Congo War in April 1999 but returned to Congolese rule by January 2000.

According to censuses, Lodja had 28,671 residents in 1984; 52,798 in 2004; 64,147 in 2012; and 68,244 in 2016.

== Language ==
The Sankuru province consists mainly of the Otetela Bantu, often shortened to Tetela, language tribal areas, with 98% speaking the language and 50-60% speaking it exclusively. Thirty to forty percent of Lodja speak Lingala, a military and trade language, with those from the Kinshasa and Équateur provinces. French is used mainly by government officials and those who are well-educated; about 20-30% of Lodja residents speak it at least conversationally. English and neighboring tribal languages, such as Tshiluba and Swahili are spoken by about 1-2%.
