= Ministry of Transport, Communications and Rural Development =

Government ministry of the Democratic Republic of the Congo

Seat of the BCC in Gombe, Kinshasa

Ministry of Transport, Communications and Rural Development (French: Ministère des Transports, Voies de Communication et Désenclavement) is a ministry of the Democratic Republic of the Congo. As of 2017 Charles Mwando Nsimba is the minister.

The Bureau Permanent d'Enquêtes d'Accidents et Incidents d'Aviation (BPEA "Permanent office of investigations of aviation Accidents/Incidents") of the ministry investigates aviation accidents and incidents. The BPEA is headquartered on the first floor of the Immeuble Zecodiam in Gombe, Kinshasa. The BPEA was created by decree no. 12/035 of 2 October 2012.

== See also ==
- Régie des Voies Aériennes de la République Démocratique du Congo
- United Nations Flight 834 (air accident that took place in the DRC)
