= Lodja Airport =

Airport in Lodja, DR Congo

Lodja Airport Aéroport de Lodja
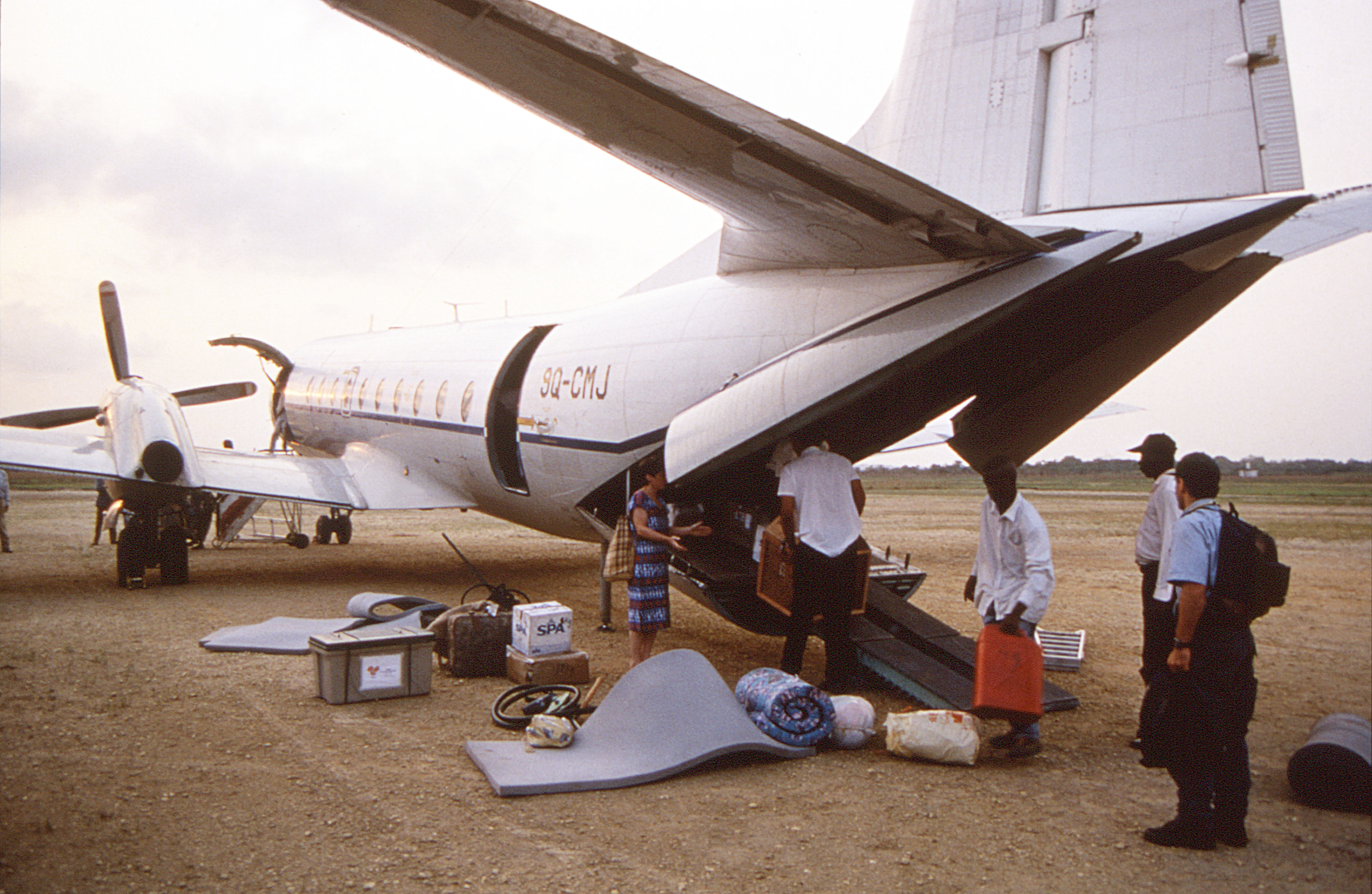
- An aircraft at the airport in 1997
- IATA: LJA; ICAO: FZVA

Summary
- Serves: Lodja, DR Congo
- Elevation AMSL: 1,647 ft / 502 m
- Coordinates: 03°27′45″S 23°36′55″E

Map
- Location of Airport in the DR Congo

Runways
Direction	Length		Surface
Direction	m	ft	Surface
09/27	1,600	5,249	Dirt
- Sources: Google Maps GCM

Lodja Airport (IATA: LJA, ICAO: FZVA) is an airport serving Lodja, a city in Sankuru Province, Democratic Republic of the Congo. It is 5 kilometres (3.1 mi) north of the city.

The Lodja VOR (ident: LJA) is on the airfield. Lodja NDB (ident: LJA) is located 1.8 kilometres (1.1 mi) south of the runway.

== Airlines and destinations ==
Airlines	Destinations
Compagnie Africaine d'Aviation	Kinshasa–N'djili

== See also ==
- Transport in the Democratic Republic of the Congo
- List of airports in the Democratic Republic of the Congo
