= List of compositions by Charles Villiers Stanford =

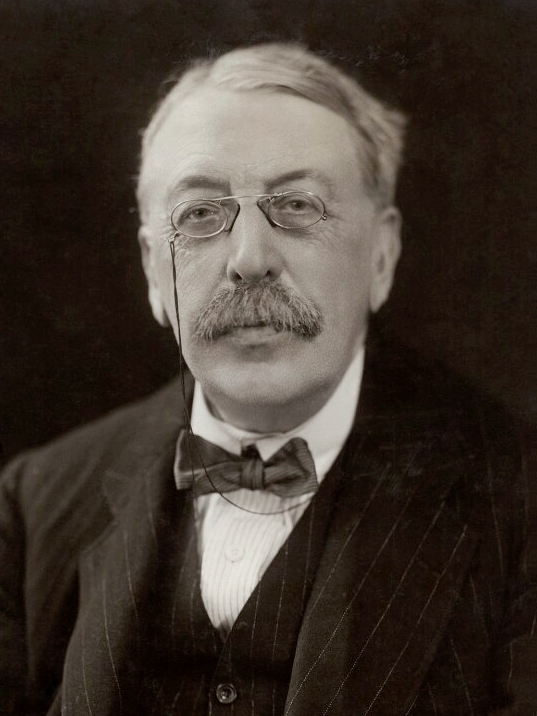
Stanford in 1921

This is a list of compositions by Charles Villiers Stanford.

== Operas ==
- The Veiled Prophet (1877, perf. 1881)
- Savonarola (1883, perf. 1884)
- The Canterbury Pilgrims (1883, perf. 1884)
- The Miner of Falun (1888 act 1 only; abandoned, unpub.)
- Lorenza, Op. 55 (1894, unperformed, unpub.)
- Shamus O'Brien, Op. 61 (1895, perf. 1896)
- Christopher Patch, the Barber of Bath, Op. 69 (1897, unperformed)
- Much Ado About Nothing or The Marriage of Hero, Op. 76a (1900, perf. 1901)
- The Critic, or An Opera Rehearsed, Op. 144 (1915, perf. 1916)
- The Travelling Companion, Op. 146 (1916, perf. posth. 1925)

== Orchestral works ==
=== Symphonies ===
- No. 1 in B♭ major (1876)
- No. 2 in D minor, "Elegiac" (1882)
- No. 3 in F minor, "Irish", Op. 28 (1887)
- No. 4 in F major, Op. 31 (1888)
- No. 5 in D major, "L'Allegro ed il Pensieroso", Op. 56 (1894)
- No. 6 in E♭ major, "In Memoriam G. F. Watts", Op. 94 (1905)
- No. 7 in D minor, Op. 124 (1911)

=== Concertos ===
- Piano Concerto No. 0 in B♭ major, WoO (early – no. "0") (1874)
- Violin Concerto No. 0 in D major, WoO (early, 1875)
- Cello Concerto in D minor, WoO (1879/1880)
- Suite in D for violin and orchestra, Op. 32
- Piano Concerto No. 1 in G major, Op. 59
- Concert Variations upon an English Theme "Down Among the Dead Men" for piano and orchestra in C minor, Op. 71
- Violin Concerto No. 1 in D major, Op. 74
- Clarinet Concerto in A minor, Op. 80 (1902)
- Piano Concerto No. 2 in C minor, Op. 126 (1911)
- Violin Concerto No. 2 in G minor, Op. 162 (1918; unfinished, orchestrated by Jeremy Dibble)
- Piano Concerto No. 3 in E♭ major, Op. 171 (1919; unfinished, orchestrated by Geoffrey Bush; there is a new orchestration by Jeremy Dibble)
- Variations for violin and orchestra, Op, 180 (1921)
- Concert Piece for organ and orchestra, Op. 181 (1921)

=== Irish Rhapsodies ===
- Irish Rhapsody for orchestra No. 1 in D minor, Op. 78
- Irish Rhapsody for orchestra No. 2 in F minor, Op. 84 ("The Lament for the Son of Ossian")
- Irish Rhapsody for cello and orchestra No. 3, Op. 137
- Irish Rhapsody for orchestra No. 4 in A minor, Op. 141 ("The Fisherman of Lough Neagh and what he saw")
- Irish Rhapsody for orchestra No. 5 in G minor, Op. 147
- Irish Rhapsody for violin and orchestra No. 6, Op. 191

=== Other orchestral works ===
- Funeral March 'The Martyrdom'
- Oedipus Rex, incidental music, Op. 29
- A Welcome March, Op. 87

== Choral works ==
=== Anthems and motets ===
- Pater Noster (1874)
- And I saw another Angel (Op. 37, No. 1) (1885)
- If thou shalt confess (Op. 37, No. 2) (1885)
- Three Latin Motets (Op. 38, published 1905)
  - Beati quorum via
  - Coelos ascendit hodie
  - Justorum animae
- Bible Songs for Unison choir (Op 113) (1909)
- Ye Choirs of New Jerusalem (Op. 123, published 1911)
- Eternal Father (Op. 135)
- For lo, I raise up (Op. 145)
- The Lord is my Shepherd (composed 1886)
- Why seek ye the living? (c. 1890)
- Engelberg (1904)
- 'How beauteous are their feet' (published 1923)

=== Services ===
- Morning, Evening, and Communion services:
  - B♭ major (Op. 10)
  - A major (Op. 12)
  - F major (Op. 36)
  - G major (Op. 81)
  - C major (Op. 115)
  - Festal Communion Service B♭ major (Op. 128) (1910/11)
  - D major for Unison Choir (1923)
- Magnificat and Nunc dimittis settings:
  - E♭ major (1873; publ. 1996)
  - F major (Queens' Service) (1872; edited Ralph Woodward and publ. 1995)
  - on the 2nd and 3rd Gregorian Modes (1907)
  - A major (Op. 12)
  - B♭ major (Op. 10)
  - C major (Op. 115)
  - G major (Op. 81)
- Magnificat in B♭ major for unaccompanied double choir, Op. 164 (September 1918): dedicated to the memory of Parry

=== Part songs ===
- 4 Part songs for SATB, Op. 47 (1892)
  - Soft, soft wind
  - Sing heigh ho
  - Airly Beacon
  - The Knight's tomb
- 4 Part songs, for male voices TTBB, Op. 106
  - Autumn Leaves
  - Love's Folly
  - To his flocks
  - Fair Phyllis
- 4 Part songs, for SATB (also for SSAA) Op. 110
  - Valentine's Day
  - Dirge
  - The Fairies
  - Heraclitus
- 3 Part songs, for SATB Op. 111
  - A Lover's Ditty
  - The Praise of Spring
  - The Patient Lover
- 8 Part songs for SATB, Op. 119 (to poems by Mary Coleridge)
  - The Witch
  - Farewell, my joy
  - The Blue Bird
  - The Train
  - The Inkbottle
  - The Swallow
  - Chillingham
  - My heart in thine
- 8 Part songs for SATB, Op. 127 (to poems by Mary Coleridge)
  - Plighted
  - Veneta
  - When Mary thro' the garden went
  - The Haven
  - The Guest
  - Larghetto
  - Wilderspin
  - To a Tree

=== Miscellaneous ===
- On Time, Choral song for unaccompanied double choir, Op. 142 Poem by John Milton
- Six Elizabethan pastorals for SATB, Op. 49
  - To his flocks
  - Corydon, Arise!
  - Diaphenia
  - Sweet love for me
  - Damon's Passion
  - Phoebe
- Six Elizabethan pastorals for SATB (second set), Op. 53
  - On a hill there grows a flower
  - Like Desert Woods
  - Praised be Diana
  - Cupid and Rosalind
  - O shady vales
  - The Shepherd Doron's jig
- Six Elizabethan pastorals for SATB (third set), Op. 67
  - A carol for Christmas
  - The Shepherd's anthem
  - Shall we go dance?
  - Love in prayers
  - Of disdainful Daphne
  - Love's fire
- Six Irish folksongs for SATB, Op. 78
  - Oh! breathe not his name
  - What the bee is to the flow'ret
  - At the mid hour of night
  - The Sword of Erin
  - It is not the tear
  - Oh the sight entrancing

=== Works for choir and orchestra ===
- The Resurrection, for tenor, choir and orchestra (1875) (words by Friedrich Gottlieb Klopstock)
- Elegiac Ode, Op. 21 (1884), words from When Lilacs Last in the Dooryard Bloom'd by Walt Whitman
- The Revenge, a ballad of the fleet, Op. 24 (1886) words by Alfred, Lord Tennyson
- Mass in G major, Op. 46
- Missa 'Via Victrix 1914–1918' for solo soprano, contralto, tenor, bass, chorus, organ and orchestra, Op. 173 (1919)
- Requiem, Op. 63 (1896)
- Te Deum, Op. 66 (1898; written for the Leeds Festival)
- Songs of the Sea for solo baritone, choir (mixed or men's voices) ad lib. and orchestra, Op. 91 (words by Henry Newbolt)
- Stabat Mater, "Symphonic Cantata" for solo soprano, mezzo-soprano, tenor, bass, choir and orchestra, Op. 96 (1906)
- Song to the Soul, for choir and orchestra, Op. 97b (1913) (words by Walt Whitman)
- Songs of the Fleet for solo baritone, SATB and orchestra, Op. 117 (words by Henry Newbolt)
- At the Abbey Gate, cantata for solo baritone, SATB and orchestra, Op. 177 (1921)

=== Songs for solo voice(s) and piano ===
- Six Songs, Op. 4 (Heinrich Heine), 1874
- Six Songs, Op. 7 (Heinrich Heine), c.1877
- "La Belle Dame sans Merci" (on the poem by John Keats), 1877
- Six Songs, Op. 19 (various), 1882
- A Child's Garland of Songs, Op. 30 (Robert Louis Stevenson), 1892
- Three Songs, Op. 43 (Robert Bridges), 1893
- The Clown's Songs from 'Twelfth Night' (Shakespeare), Op. 65, 1896
- An Irish Idyll in Six Miniatures, Op. 77 (Moira O'Neill), 1901
- Songs of Faith, Op. 97, set 1 (Tennyson) (Nos. 1–3); set 2 (Walt Whitman) (Nos. 4–6), 1906
- A Sheaf of Songs from Leinster, Op. 140 (Winifred M. Letts), 1913

== Chamber music ==
- String quartets
  - No. 1 in G major, Op. 44 (1891)
  - No. 2 in A minor, Op. 45 (1891)
  - No. 3 in D minor, Op. 64 (1897)
  - No. 4 in G minor, Op. 99 (1907)
  - No. 5 in B♭ major, Op. 104 (1908)
  - No. 6 in A minor, Op. 122 (1910)
  - No. 7 in C minor, Op. 166 (1919)
  - No. 8 in E minor, Op. 167 (1919)
- Other works for string ensemble
  - String quintet No. 1 in F major, Op. 85 for two violins, two violas & cello (1903)
  - String quintet No. 2 in C minor, Op. 86 (1903)
- Piano trios
  - No. 1 in E♭ major, Op. 35 (1889)
  - No. 2 in G minor, Op. 73 (1899)
  - No. 3 in A "Per aspera ad astra", Op. 158 (1918)
- Works for violin and piano
  - Sonata No. 1 in D major, Op. 11 (1880)
  - Sonata No. 2 in A major, Op. 70 (1898)
  - Sonata No. 3, Op. 165 (1919)
  - Legend, WoO (1893)
  - Irish Fantasies, Op. 54 (1894)
  - Five Characteristic Pieces, Op. 93 (1905)
  - Six Irish Sketches, Op. 154 (1917)
  - Six Easy Pieces, Op. 155 (1917)
  - Five Bagatelles, Op. 183 (1921)
  - Six Irish Dances
- Other works for solo instrument and piano
  - Sonata No. 1 in A major for violoncello & piano, Op. 9 (1878)
  - Sonata No. 2 in D minor for violoncello & piano, Op. 39 (1893)
  - Three Intermezzi for clarinet & piano, Op. 13 (1880)
  - Sonata for clarinet (or viola) & piano, Op. 129 (1912)
- Other works for strings and piano
  - Piano quartet No. 1 in F major, Op. 15 (1879)
  - Piano quartet No. 2, Op. 133 (1912)
  - Piano quintet in D minor, Op. 25 (1887)
- Serenade in F major for Nonet, Op. 95 (1906)
- Fantasy No. 1 in G minor for clarinet & string quartet, WoO (1921)
- Fantasy No. 2 in F major for clarinet & string quartet, WoO (1922)
- Phantasy for horn & string quartet in A minor, WoO (1922)

== Piano music ==
- Piano Suite (4), Op. 2
- Toccata in C major, Op. 3
- Old and New Dances (10), Op. 58
- Dante Rhapsodies (3), Op. 92
- Characteristic Pieces (6), Op. 132
- Capriccios (5), Op. 136
- Night Thoughts (6), Op. 148
- Scènes de ballet (6), Op. 150
- Preludes in all the keys (24), Set I, Op. 163
- Ballade, Op. 170
- Waltzes (3), Op. 178
- Preludes in all the keys (24), Set II, Op. 179
- A Toy Story (6)
- Elementary Sketches (6)
- Fancies (3)
- Novellettes (2)
- Primary Sketches (6)
- Song-Tunes (6)
- Waltzes (6) and Coda (1)

== Organ music ==
- Chorale Preludes (8)
- Chorale Preludes, Op. 182
- Fantasia and Toccata, Op. 57 (1894, revised 1917)
- Fantasie on Intercessor, Op. 187
- Four Intermezzi
- Idyl and Fantasia, Op. 121
- Intermezzo on Londonderry Air, Op. 189
- Prelude and Fugue in E minor
- Quasi una Fantasia (1921)
- Six Occasional Preludes, 2 books
- Six Preludes, Op. 88
- Six Short Preludes and Postludes, Op. 101
- Six Short Preludes and Postludes, Op. 105
  - On a theme of Orlando Gibbons Song 34: The Angels' Song
  - On a theme of Orlando Gibbons Song 22:
  - Lento
  - On a theme of Orlando Gibbons Song 24:
  - Trio
  - Allegro
- Sonata No. 1, Op. 149 (1917)
- Sonata "Eroica" No. 2, Op. 151 (1917)
- Sonata "Britannica" No. 3, Op. 152 (1918)
- Sonata "Celtica" No. 4, Op. 153 (1920)
- Sonata "Quasi Una Fantasia" No. 5, Op. 159 (1921)
- Te Deum Laudamus Fantasy
- Three Preludes and Fugues, Op. 193 (1923)
- Toccata and Fugue in D minor (1907)
- Fantasie and Fugue in D minor, Op. 103 (1907)

== Miscellaneous ==
- 11-bell version of the Whittington chimes (1905)
