= Rootham =

Rootham is a surname. Notable people with the surname include:

- Cyril Rootham (1875–1938), English composer, educator, and organist
- Graeme Rootham (born 1948), Australian runner
- Helen Rootham, governess of Edith Sitwell
- Jasper Rootham (1910–1990), British civil servant, soldier, banker, writer, and poet
