= Three motets =

Three motets may refer to:

- Drei Motetten, Op. 39 (Mendelssohn) by Felix Mendelssohn in 1830
- Three Latin Motets by Charles Villiers Stanford in 1905
