= Op. 21 =

In music, Op. 21 stands for Opus number 21. Compositions that are assigned this number include:

- Barber – Capricorn Concerto
- Beethoven – Symphony No. 1
- Britten – Diversions for Piano Left Hand and Orchestra
- Chopin – Piano Concerto No. 2
- Dvořák – Piano Trio No. 1
- Enescu – Symphony No. 3
- Graham – Episodes
- Lalo – Symphonie espagnole
- Larionov – Chout
- Oswald – Cello Sonata No. 1
- Ries – Cello Sonata No. 3
- Sarasate – Spanish Dances, Book I
- Schoenberg – Pierrot lunaire
- Schumann – Novelletten
- Sibelius – "Hymn", song for male choir a cappella (1896, revised 1898)
- Villiers – Elegiac Ode
- Weill – Der Zar lässt sich photographieren
