= Shamus O'Brien =

Shamus O'Brien may refer to:

- Shamus O'Brien (play), 1887 Australian stage play
- Shamus O'Brien (opera), 1896 Irish opera
- Shamus O'Brien (soccer) (1907–1981), American-Scottish footballer
