= Elegiac Ode =

Music by Charles Villiers Stanford

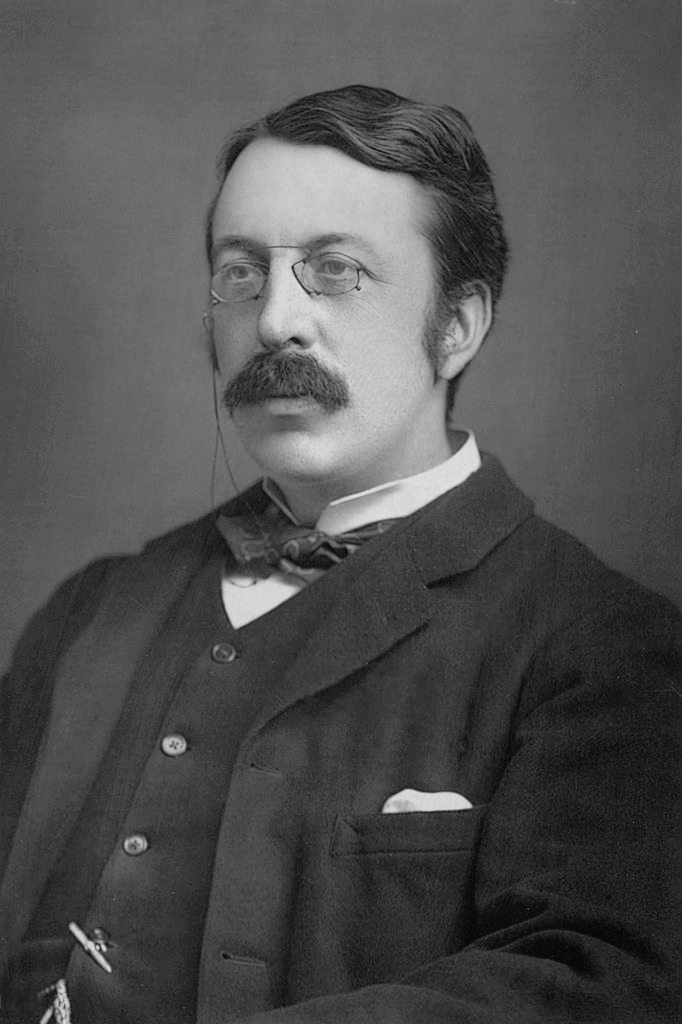
Charles Villiers Stanford

Elegiac Ode, Op. 21, is a musical composition by British composer Charles Villiers Stanford (1852–1924) written and first performed in 1884. It is a four-movement work scored for baritone and soprano soloists, chorus and orchestra, Stanford's composition is a setting of Walt Whitman's 1865 elegy, "When Lilacs Last in the Dooryard Bloom'd", mourning the death of American president Abraham Lincoln. According to musicologist Jack Sullivan, Stanford's Elegiac Ode likely had reached a wider audience during Whitman's lifetime than his poems.

== See also ==
- List of compositions by Charles Villiers Stanford
