= Why seek ye the living? =

- Anthem by Charles Villiers Stanford
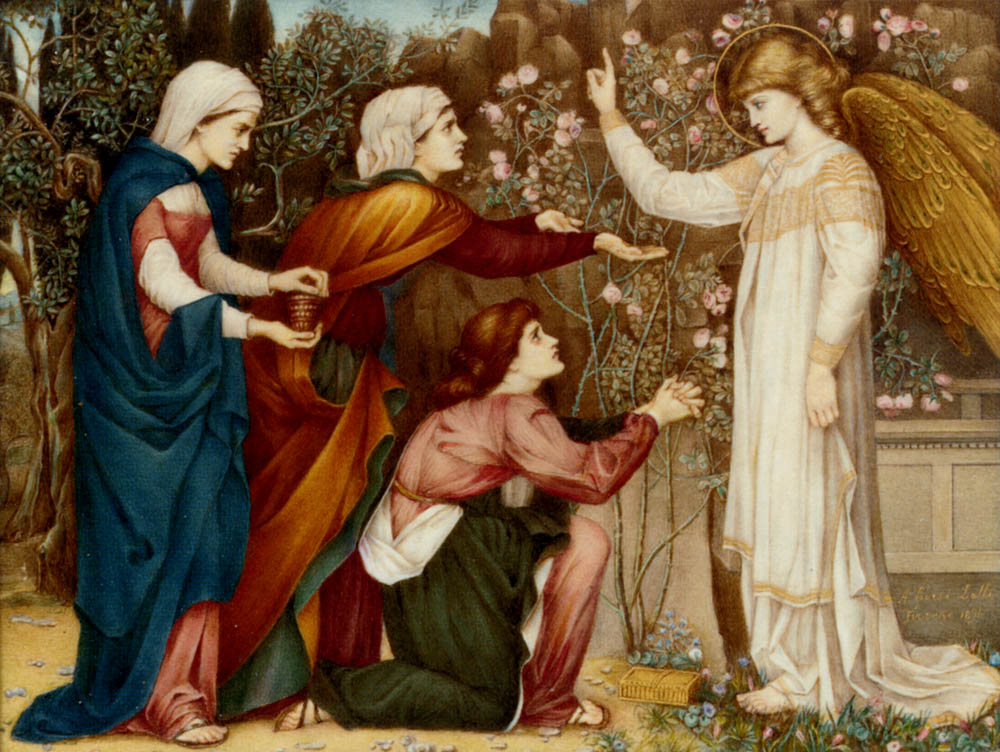
- Why seek ye the living among the dead?, a contemporary painting by J. R. S. Stanhope, 1896
- Key: D major
- Genre: Sacred choral music
- Text: Luke 24:5–7
- Language: English
- Composed: c. 1890
- Published: 1890
- Scoring: SATB choir; organ

"Why seek ye the living?" is an anthem for four-part choir and organ by Charles Villiers Stanford, a setting of a passage from the Gospel of Luke, related to Easter.

== History ==
Stanford was organist at Trinity College, Cambridge, from 1873 to 1892. He composed his first oratorio, The Three Holy Children, in 1885 on a commission of the Birmingham Festival, where Charles Gounod's oratorio trilogy La rédemption (1862) had been performed successfully in 1882. Gounod's work contains the text from the Gospel of Luke, which Stanford later used, as an alto aria at the beginning of Part II.

During his time in Cambridge, Stanford wrote several anthems on texts from the New Testament, while psalm settings were more traditional. He composed for example If ye then be risen with Christ on a text from Colossians 3 in 1883, and Blessed are the dead from Revelation 14 in 1886. He composed the setting of Luke 24:5–7 c. 1890. The topic of the anthem is given by the first line, "Why seek ye the living among the dead?" It was first published in 1890 in the Free Church Hymn Book. In 1993, it was included in Favourite anthem book. 7, Twenty-five anthems for SATB, edited by Anthea Smith and published by Kevin Mayhew. The anthem was included in the service of Choral Evensong for Easter Day at Crediton Parish Church in 2013.

Luke's account in chapters 23 and 24 is that women visit the site where the body of Jesus was laid after his death, but cannot find the body. Two "men in shining garments" (traditionally identified with angels) address them with the verses which Stanford set:

Why seek ye the living among the dead?
He is not here, but is risen: remember how he spake unto you when he was yet in Galilee,
Saying, The Son of man must be delivered into the hands of sinful men, and be crucified, and the third day rise again.
