= Violin Sonata No. 1 (Stanford) =

1877 composition by Charles Villiers Stanford

Violin Sonata
- No. 1
- by Charles Villiers Stanford
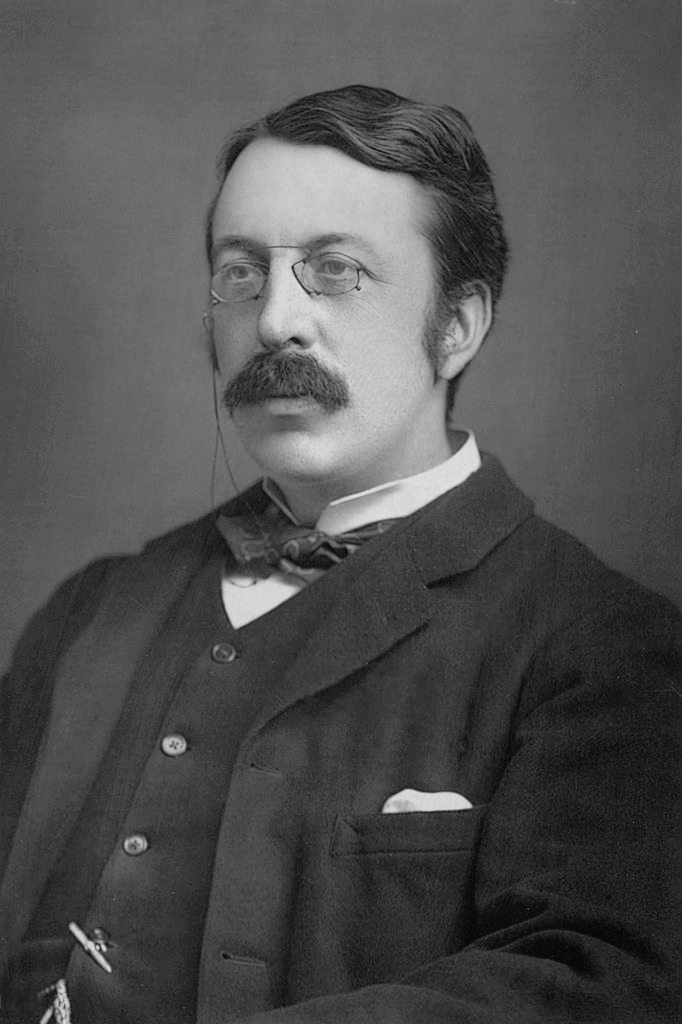
- Stanford in 1894
- Key: D major
- Opus: 11
- Composed: 1877
- Published: 1878
- Movements: 3

The Violin Sonata No. 1 in D major, Op. 11, was composed by Charles Villiers Stanford in 1877, shortly after the composer completed his studies in Germany. It was one of his first pieces of chamber music, preceded only by his A major cello sonata. First performed the year it was composed, the sonata was published in 1878 by Ries & Erler in Germany, with a dedication to violinist Ludwig Straus. (Note: The score on the IMSLP page is a reprint dating from around 1883.)

== History ==
Stanford composed this work in 1877, shortly after returning to Trinity College, Cambridge, from a period abroad studying composition in Germany. It is one of several works he completed that year, the others being settings of Psalm 46 and Keats poem, "La Belle Dame sans Merci", a now lost Overture for the Three Choirs Festival, and his first piece of chamber music, a cello sonata in A major.

The first performance, with the composer at the piano and Ludwig Straus as the violinist, took place on 18 May 1877 at a concert organized by the Cambridge University Musical Society; the work's London premiere with the same performers took place on 6 November. Jeremy Dibble writes that the composer's original plan was to have the composition published in the United Kingdom through Novello & Co., but due to the fact that it was uncommon for British firms to publish chamber music at the time, Stanford instead had to locate a German publisher, eventually setting on the Dresden-based firm of Ries & Erler, who published the work as the composer's Opus 11, with a dedication to Ludwig Straus.

Following publication, the violinist Hermann Franke, a student of Joseph Joachim, took the work into his repertoire and performed it in a series of London-based concerts in 1882.

The work would not be recorded, however, until the 1990s, when the label CALA United released a recording by violinist Susanne Stanzeleit and pianist Gusztáv Fenyö of the Op. 11 sonata paired with violin sonatas by Thomas Dunhill and Granville Bantock. The same recording was re-issued by Regis Records in the 2000s, both as a single CD under their own label and paired with another CALA United CD featuring violin sonatas by Peter Racine Fricker, Alan Rawsthorne, and Ralph Vaughan Williams, performed by Stanzeleit and pianist Julian Jacobson under their Priory Records sub-label.

Hyperion Records released a recording of the Op. 11 sonata paired with the composer's Op. 70 sonata performed by violinist Paul Barrett and pianist Catherine Edwards in 1999. In 2013, violinist Alberto Bologni and pianist Christopher Howell recorded the piece as part of a collection of all the known surviving works by Stanford for this instrumental composition that was released by Sheva Records.

== Structure ==
The sonata is in three movements:

1. Allegro
2. Allegretto moderato – Tempo di minuetto – Tempo I
3. Allegretto

An average performance takes around 22–26 minutes.

Both Jeremy Dibble and Paul Rodmell in their books on the composer note that this work, composed before Stanford had encountered Brahms's violin sonatas shows the influence of Beethoven and Schumann. Where the two authors differ is that Rodmell does not regard the sonata as a completely successful work, citing an anonymous review in the Oxford and Cambridge Undergraduate's Journal of the premier performance in which the reviewer expressed his belief that the concluding movements of the sonata were not up to the same standard as the first in support.
