= Songs of the Sea (Stanford) =

Classical song cycle by Charles Villiers Stanford, premiered in 1904

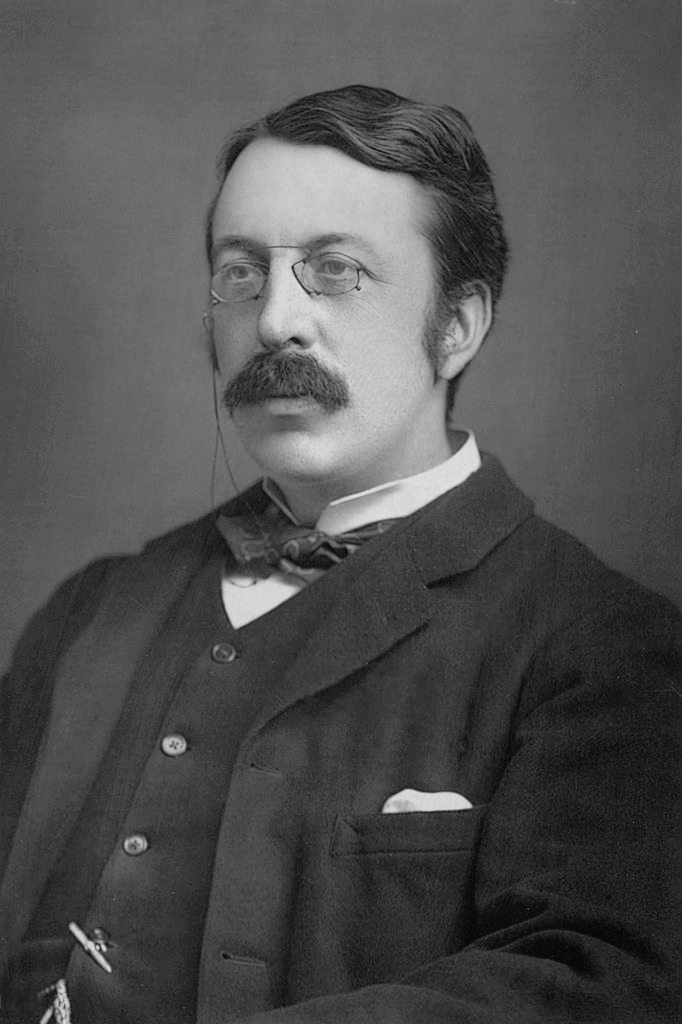
Charles Villiers Stanford

Songs of the Sea is a cycle of five songs for baritone, male voice chorus, and orchestra, to poems by Henry Newbolt. It was composed by Charles Villiers Stanford, was premiered at the 1904 Leeds Festival, and was published as his Op. 91.

Songs of the Fleet is a companion cycle of five songs for baritone, mixed chorus, and orchestra, also to poems by Newbolt. It was premiered at Leeds in 1910, and was published by Stanford as his Op. 117.

== Overview ==
According to music critic Geoffrey Crankshaw:

"Newbolt was particularly drawn to England's naval traditions and to the lure of the sea in general. His imagery was uncomplicated and his language bracing - just the right material for Stanford's down-to-earth honesty of vision.

[...]

"Some general features of [Stanford's] style are readily grasped: for instance, he favoured swift forward movement; rhetoric is present, but never overdone. Then, too, his harmonies are lucid - some might say unadventurous, but they are always pertinent to the immediate task of underpinning a key-point in the text. Melodic lines are clean-cut, and the accompaniments are functional and airy in texture."

"Drake's Drum" may be the best known of the ten songs. It relates to the legend that Sir Francis Drake, naval hero under Elizabeth I of England, on his deathbed in the Spanish Main, asked that his drum be taken to England. He promised that should it be beaten in the hour of England's gravest need, he and his fleet would reappear in the English Channel to repel the invaders; as they did the Spanish Armada in 1588. It has been recorded by, among others, Peter Dawson, John Shirley-Quirk and Sir Thomas Allen; either in the original version, or in an arrangement for voice and piano.

== Songs of the Sea ==
Songs of the Sea was written for Harry Plunket Greene, a renowned baritone in his day. He gave the first performance, at the 1904 Leeds Festival. The texts are:

1. "Drake's Drum"
2. "Outward Bound"
3. "Devon, O Devon, in Wind and Rain"
4. "Homeward Bound"
5. "The Old Superb"

A complete performance takes about 18 minutes.

Haydn Wood (1882-1959), best known for his light music, made an orchestral arrangement of Songs of the Sea, known variously as Stanford Rhapsody and as Westward Ho.

== Songs of the Fleet ==
Greene was also connected with Songs of the Fleet, premiered at the 1910 Leeds Festival. The texts are:

1. "Sailing at Dawn"
2. "The Song of the Sou'wester"
3. "The Middle Watch"
4. "The Little Admiral"
5. "Fare Well"

A complete performance takes about 26 minutes.

== Notable recordings ==
- 1928/1933 – Peter Dawson with unnamed men's chorus, orchestra and conductor. His Master's Voice B 2743. (78 rpm)
- 1983 - Benjamin Luxon with the Bournemouth Symphony Chorus and Bournemouth Symphony Orchestra under Norman Del Mar. EMI Records ASD 4401.
