= Jasper Rootham =

British civil servant, soldier and banker

Jasper St John Rootham (21 November 1910 – 28 May 1990), was a civil servant, soldier, central banker, merchant banker, writer and poet.

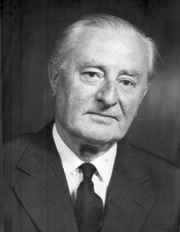
Jasper Rootham in 1972

== Biography ==
=== Childhood and adolescence ===
Jasper Rootham was born on 21 November 1910 in Cambridge, UK. Rootham was an only child.

His paternal grandfather was the singer, organist, and conductor Daniel Wilberforce Rootham (1837–1922). His father Cyril Rootham was a well-known musician and composer based at St John's College, Cambridge. His mother Rosamond Margaret Rootham (née Lucas) had been a notable suffragette, and continued as a campaigner on various social issues throughout her life.

Rootham studied at Tonbridge School before moving on to St John's College, Cambridge.

=== University ===
Rootham read Classics at St John's College, Cambridge, and commenced his studies there in 1928. He became acquainted with Enoch Powell with whom he formed a lifelong friendship. (Powell gave the address at Rootham's funeral in Wimborne in 1990.)

During his vacations Rootham travelled in France, Germany and Switzerland, gaining fluency in French and German.

Rootham distinguished himself in Classics at Cambridge, graduating with a double First. While at St John's College, he also found time for sport (St John's Rugby Club) and music (playing the cello in the Cambridge University Musical Society under the baton of his father Cyril Rootham). In August 1934 Rootham played the cello in Michael Tippett's "people's" ballad opera "Robin Hood", conducted by the composer, at Boosbeck in North Yorkshire.

=== Early career ===
Rootham started his working life as a civil servant. At the start of the Second World War, Rootham was working in the office of prime minister Neville Chamberlain, where his fluency in French and German were often called upon during negotiations with the French and German governments. After Chamberlain's resignation in May 1940, Rootham worked for Chamberlain's successor as prime minister Winston Churchill.

=== Second World War ===
Anxious to play his part in the war effort, Rootham resigned from the Civil Service in 1941 to join the Special Operations Executive. He was posted to Cairo where he was trained as a parachutist, eventually to be dropped into Yugoslavia. While in Cairo, he also learned Russian in which he became fully fluent. On completion of his training he was parachuted into eastern Serbia with a small team of British soldiers as part of the Mission Greenwood-Rootham. Their purpose was to support the Serb army under Draža Mihailović in their fight against the German army. Rootham became fluent in Serbo-Croat.

However, the policy of the British government later changed, and UK support was switched from Mihailović to the communist partisans under Josip Broz Tito. At that point, Rootham and his British troops were hurriedly withdrawn from Yugoslavia – an action which Rootham regarded as a betrayal of Mihailović. After the war had ended, he wrote an account of this military venture which was published under the title "Miss-Fire".

In 1945, Rootham was posted to Berlin where his fluency in Russian involved him in negotiations with the Soviet army in the run-up to the Potsdam Conference.

=== Marriage and family ===
At the end of the Second World War in 1945, Rootham married Joan McClelland who was a ballerina with Ballet Rambert (later to become the Rambert Dance Company).

In 1947, they had a son John Daniel ("Dan") Rootham, and in 1951 a daughter Catherine Virginia ("Tutu") Rootham.

Joan McClelland continued to dance with Ballet Rambert until the birth of their second child, and in later years she also taught at Ballet Rambert.

=== Post-war career ===
On leaving the armed forces, Rootham joined the Bank of England where he remained for twenty years. In the mid-1950s Rootham and his wife travelled to Russia as part of an official delegation sent by the Bank of England. During his career at the Bank of England, Rootham travelled regularly to meetings of the Bank for International Settlements in Basel.

In 1968, Rootham left the Bank of England to join the London merchant bank Lazard Brothers. He was once heard to remark that he made more profit for Lazard in preventing unprofitable deals than in acquiring new business.

Rootham also held non-executive directorships with the British Sugar Corporation (now British Sugar plc) and with the Agricultural Mortgage Corporation.

=== Writings ===
Throughout his life, Rootham found pleasure in writing. He wrote an autobiographical account of his wartime experiences in Yugoslavia under the title "Miss-Fire". Two novels "Demi-Paradise" and "Cupid and the Willow Wood" followed, and in his later years Rootham published several volumes of poetry.

=== Musical activity ===
Rootham was extremely keen that the music of his father Cyril Rootham should be performed and heard more widely. In 1936 Cyril Rootham composed a setting of Jasper's poem City in the West for chorus, string orchestra and harp - the city is Bristol, Cyril Rootham's birthplace. From 1960 until his death in 1990, Jasper Rootham was tireless in promoting performances and recordings of Cyril's works. Several of these performances were released on LP or CD. In 1975 the BBC broadcast one of Cyril Rootham's major works, his setting of Milton's poem Ode on the Morning of Christ's Nativity. Jasper Rootham's son Dan has continued this work.

== Bibliography of published works ==
- Prose
  - 1946, Miss Fire: The Chronicle of a British Mission to Mihailovich 1943-1944, Chatto & Windus.
  - 1960, Demi-Paradise, Chatto & Windus.
- Poetry
  - 1936, City in the West, set for chorus and orchestra by Cyril Rootham
  - 1972, Verses 1928–1972, Rampant Lions Press, Cambridge.
  - 1975, The Celestial City and other poems, Two Jays Press, Saffron Walden.
  - 1978, Reflections from a Crag, Unit Offset Ltd, Northumberland.
  - 1980, Selected Poems, The Weybrook Press, London.
  - 1981, Stand Fixed in Steadfast Gaze: XIII Poems at Seventy, The Lomond Press, Kinnesswood.
  - 1982, Affirmation, The Lomond Press, Kinnesswood: ISBN 0-907765-04-1
  - 1990, Saluting the Colours, Dorset Publishing Company: ISBN 0-948699-22-1
