= The Travelling Companion (opera) =

The Travelling Companion is a 1925 opera by Charles Villiers Stanford based on the tale of the same name by Hans Christian Andersen.
