= Serenade in F major (Stanford) =

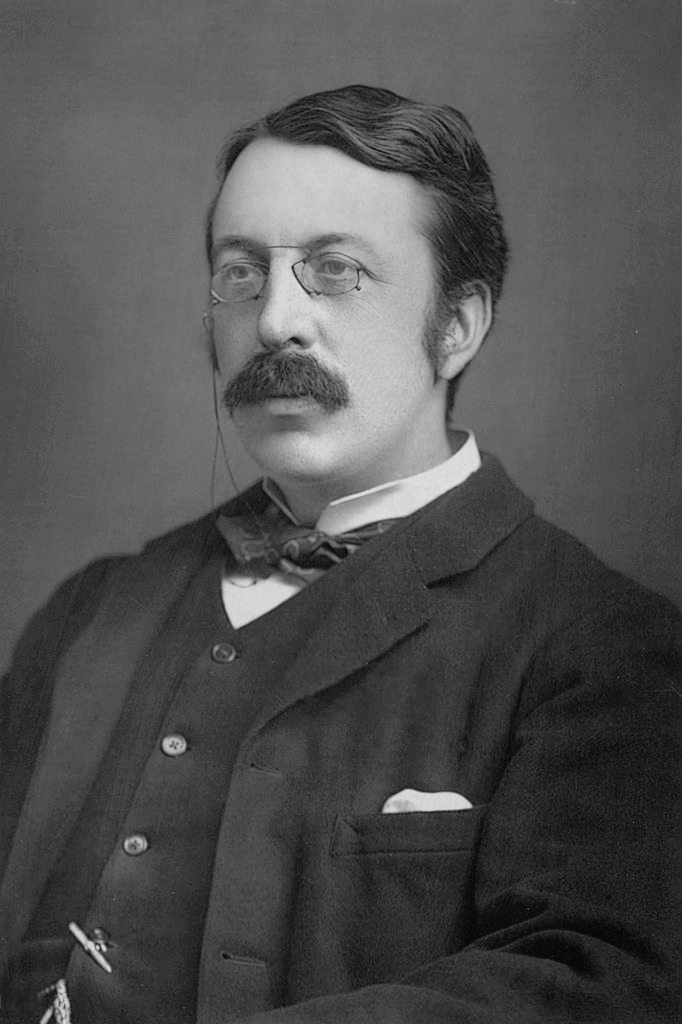
Charles Villiers Stanford

Charles Villiers Stanford's Serenade in F major, Op. 95 is a composition for a chamber ensemble of nine soloists, composed in 1905. Stanford composed the Serenade between June and July 1905, at the same time as he was working on his Sixth Symphony.

== Music ==
The composition is scored for flute, clarinet, bassoon, horn, 2 violins, viola, cello, and double bass.

The composition is in four movements:

1. Allegro
2. Allegro molto
3. Andante
4. Allegro comodo

== Performance history ==
According to Dibble the first performance of the Serenade took place at the Aeolian Hall, London on 25 January 1906. He also notes a further performance by students at the Royal College of Music in 1913. However, Wilcox, citing Michael Bryant, states that the first public performance was in Sheffield in 1937.
