= Cambridge University Musical Society =

College orchestral and choral ensemble federation

The Cambridge University Musical Society (CUMS) is a federation of the university's main orchestral and choral ensembles, which cumulatively put on a substantial concert season during the university term.

== Foundation ==
In 1843 the Cambridge University Musical Society (CUMS) was established, and was originally called the Peterhouse Musical Society as most of its members were originally undergraduates from that college. The founders of CUMS included John Bacchus Dykes, William Thomson and John A. L. Airey.

== Conductors of CUMS ==
Many respected musical figures have directed the Cambridge University Musical Society, including the following:

- Charles Villiers Stanford
- Cyril Rootham
- Colin Davis
- David Willcocks
- Philip Ledger
- Stephen Cleobury
- Robin Ticciati
- Richard Armstrong (conductor)
- Mark Elder
- Peter Stark
- David Hill (choral director)
- Roger Norrington
- Nicholas Collon

== Ensembles ==
Students wishing to join an orchestra are required to audition at the beginning of the academic year. One audition is required for all ensembles, and based on your abilities and preferences, you are allocated a position. Competition for places is variable depending on instrument. Selection is purely on merit, and irrespective of age, standing in the university, or subject being read. At least half, if not more, of the ensembles are made up of students who do not read music at the university.

=== Cambridge University Orchestra (CUO) ===
A full symphony orchestra, consisting of the university's elite instrumental musicians, most of whom either hold university instrumental awards or have been involved in nationally significant music making, particularly the National Youth Orchestra. The ensemble is conducted by professional conductors, such as Sir Mark Elder, Sir Roger Norrington, and John Wilson.

=== Cambridge University Sinfonia (CUS) ===
The second symphony orchestra of CUMS, giving three concerts in the academic year. Conducted by the CUMS Conducting Scholar.

=== Cambridge University Wind Orchestra (CUWO) ===
The wind orchestra, conducted by the CUMS Assistant Conductor.

=== Cambridge University Symphony Chorus (CUSC) ===
The large choir, conducted by many well-known conductors over the years (see above).

=== Cambridge University Chamber Choir ===
A small choir, consisting of the university's elite singers, directed by Martin Ennis and David Lowe.

=== Cambridge University Lunchtime Concerts ===
A series of lunchtime recitals, run by a committee of students, supported by CUMS.

=== Cambridge University Percussion Ensemble ===
The newest addition to the CUMS family. Run by students.
