= Three Latin Motets (Stanford) =

Compositions by Charles Villiers Stanford

- by Charles Villiers Stanford
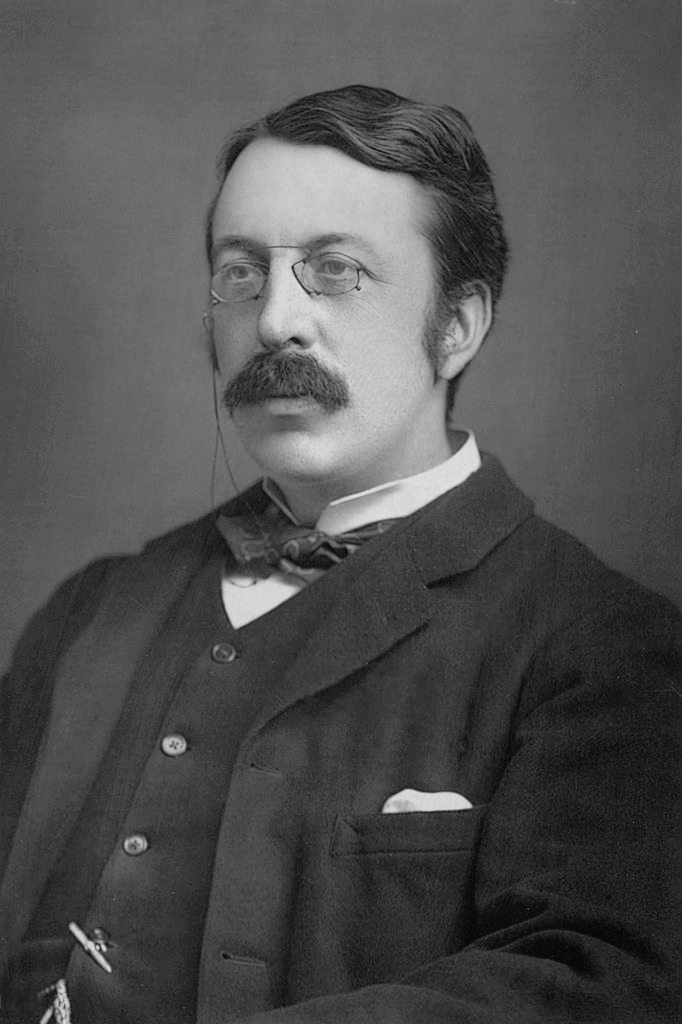
- The composer c. 1894
- Opus: 38
- Text: No. 1: Book of Wisdom; No. 2: Ascension hymn; No. 3: Paraphrase of Psalm 119:1
- Dedication: Alan Gray and Choir of Trinity College, Cambridge
- Published: 1905
- Vocal: SATB choir

Three Latin Motets, Op. 38, is a collection of three sacred motets based on Latin texts for mixed unaccompanied choir by Charles Villiers Stanford, comprising Justorum animae, Coelos ascendit hodie and Beati quorum via. The texts come from different sources, and the scoring is for four to eight parts. They were published by Boosey & Co in 1905. The works, some of Stanford's few settings of church music in Latin, have remained in the choral repertoire internationally and are performed in liturgies and concert.

== History ==
Stanford may have composed the three motets at the end of the 19th century, possibly when he was a teacher at the Royal College of Music in London. John Bawden assumes that he wrote the works even earlier, in 1892, when he left his position as the organist of Trinity College, Cambridge, dedicating them to Alan Gray, his successor, and the college choir. Stanford's biographer Jeremy Dibble noted performances of the first motet at the chapel of Trinity College during Evensong on 24 February 1888 and 24 February 1892, and of the last one likely there on 1 February 1890, and therefore deduced that they were written around 1887/88. In a letter dated 18 November 1888, Stanford wrote to the publisher Novello of his interest in setting introits from the Catholic missal, which he felt were "admirably suitable and always lyrical (not didactic) in character". In 1891, he wrote to the publisher requesting the return of the scores that were not published, because he wanted to reuse them. These pieces were probably the subsequently published motets, because other than these, Stanford wrote music for the Anglican Church in English.

Stanford did not set introits but rather Latin texts of different origin. His autographs are lost. The pieces were published as motets in 1905 by Boosey & Co, which made them suitable for both Catholic and Anglican usage. Three Latin Motets comprised Justorum animae, Coelos ascendit hodie and Beati quorum via. The motets became a staple of Anglican church music, frequently performed and recorded, both as a set and individually.

== Motet descriptions ==
The three a cappella motets are all based on Latin texts, but with different background, scoring and character:

1. Justorum animae (The souls of the righteous are in the hand of God) for four-part choir SATB
2. Coelos ascendit hodie (Today, Jesus Christ has ascended into the heavens) for two four-part choirs
3. Beati quorum via (Blessed are those that are undefiled) for six-part choir SSATBB

=== Justorum animae ===
In Justorum animae, Stanford set verses from the beginning of chapter 3 of the Book of Wisdom, "Justorum animae in manu Dei sunt, et non tanget eos tormentum malitiae. Vissi sunt oculis insipientium, illi autem sunt in pace" (But the souls of the righteous are in the hand of God, and there shall no torment touch them. In the sight of the unwise they seemed to die, but they are in peace). In the Catholic missal, it is an offertory hymn on All Souls' Day. Brahms, whom Stanford admired, used the same passage for the fugue ending the third movement of Ein deutsches Requiem. Stanford composed the text for a mixed unaccompanied four-part choir, SATB. The piece is in G major and common time, marked Andante moderato. Its outer sections consider the souls, in peace in God's hand, while a contrasting middle section reflects the torment mentioned. The reprise adds sustained notes to the first theme.

=== Coelos ascendit hodie ===
In Coelos ascendit hodie, Stanford set an Ascension hymn which is well known in German as "Gen Himmel aufgefahren ist" from the 14th century. Stanford composed the text for a two mixed unaccompanied four-part choirs, both SATB. The piece is in A major and common time, marked Allegro. Stanford wrote an antiphonal setting, with choir II interrupting choir I by inserted Alleluja calls to the first line, with switched positions for the second line. The piece has a strong rhythmic element, and closes with both choirs united on "Amen".

=== Beati quorum via ===
Stanford set a paraphrase of the first verse of Psalm 119 in Latin, "Beati quorum via integra est, qui ambulant in lege Domini" (Happy are they that are upright in the way, who walk in the law of the LORD). He composed the text for a mixed unaccompanied six-part choir, SSATBB. The piece is in A-flat major and 3/4 time, marked Con moto tranqillo ma no troppo lento (In calm movement but not too slow). The three upper voices begin, imitated by the three lower voices. For the second part of the text, the lower voices begin with different material. Dibble noted that the piece is reminiscent of the sonata form, with these two themes, which are then combined. He called the motet a "pastoral prayer", and it was also described as "meditative in character". R. J. Stove wrote in his review of Paul Rodmell's Stanford biography: "his finest unaccompanied motets, such as Beati quorum via, attain neo-Brucknerian sublimity", comparing Stanford's work to that of Hubert Parry and Anton Bruckner.

== Recordings ==
The three motets were recorded in 2012 by the Winchester Cathedral Choir, conducted by David Hill, in a collection of Stanford's sacred choral music. They appeared, sung by the Choir of Trinity College, Cambridge, conducted by Stephen Layton, on a 2017 collection of choral music by Stanford.

== Legacy ==
Of Stanford's works, his church music, and particularly the Three Latin Motets, continues to be frequently performed and recorded, while his music in other genres, such as opera and orchestral music, is rarely performed. The Stanford Society presents a recording of Beati by Voces8 on its web page.
