= Drei Motetten, Op. 39 (Mendelssohn) =

Composition by Felix Mendelssohn

Drei Motetten
- Motets by Felix Mendelssohn
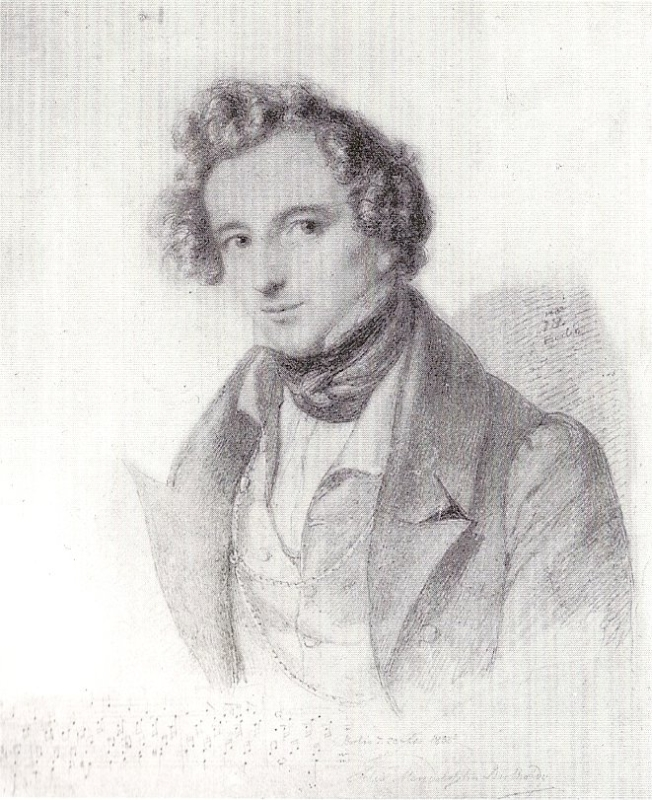
- The composer in 1833, drawing by Eduard Bendemann
- English: Three motets
- Opus: 39
- Text: Veni Domine; Laudate pueri (Psalm 113, Psalm 128); Surrexit pastor bonus
- Language: Latin
- Composed: 1830
- Published: 1838
- Scoring: SSAA; organ

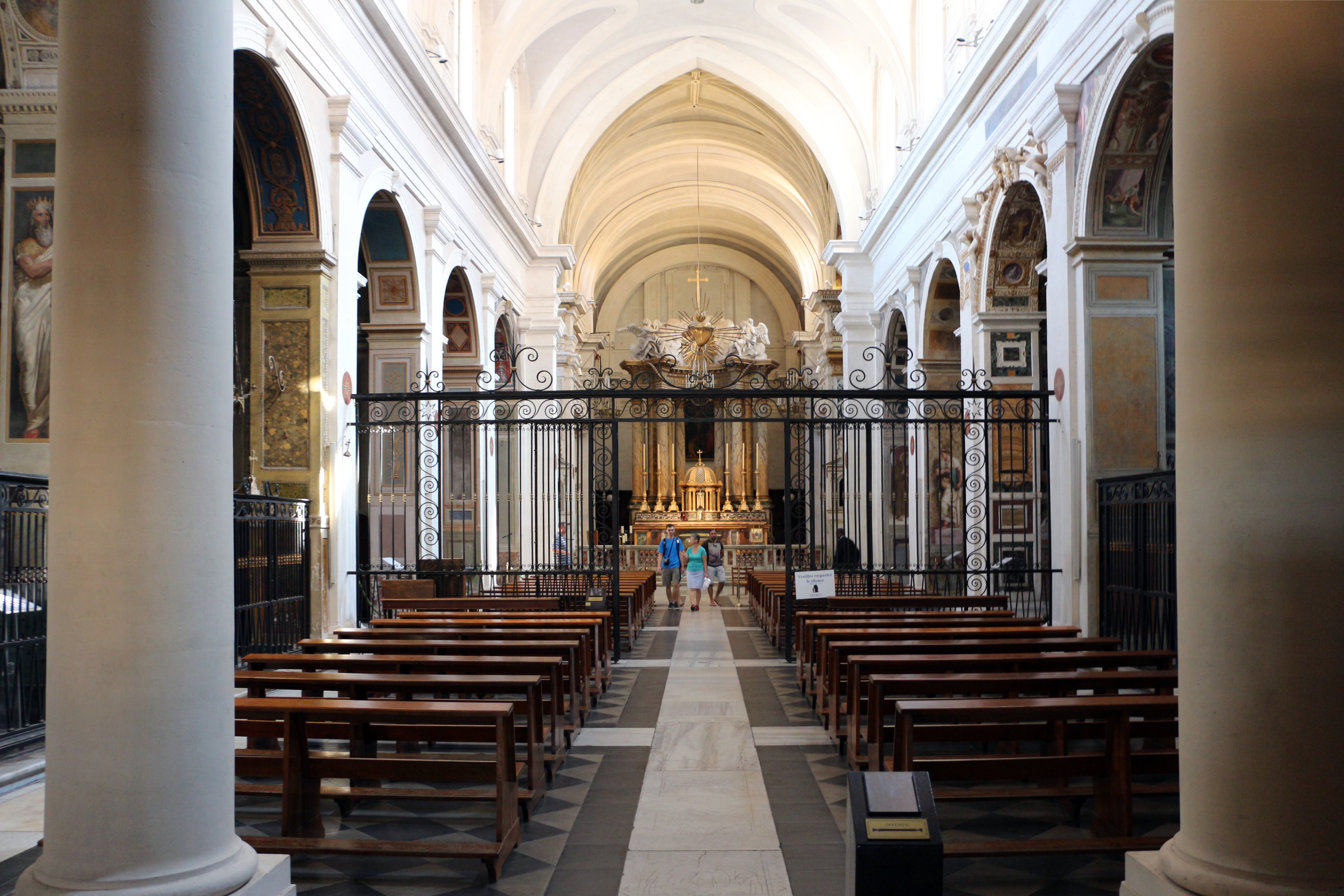
Trinità dei Monti atop the scalinata

Drei Motetten (Three motets), Op. 39, is a collection of three sacred motets for women's voices and organ by Felix Mendelssohn. Composed in 1830 for different liturgical occasions and in different scoring, they were published together in 1838.

== History ==
Mendelssohn composed three motets for women's voices inspired by a visit to Trinità dei Monti, the church at the top of the Spanish Steps in Rome, which he visited in 1830. Having heard the nuns sing there, he wrote to his parents on 20 December 1830:

The French nuns sing there, and it is wonderfully lovely. ... Now, one should know one more thing: that one is not allowed to see the singers. Therefore I have come to an unusual decision: I will compose something for their voices, which I remember exactly

He composed Veni Domine, Laudate pueri and O beata et benedicta the same year. In the three motets published together in 1838, he replaced O beata et benedicta with the more substantial Surrexit pastor bonus.

== Structure ==
The titles of the three motets, Op. 39, are:

1. Veni Domine
2. Laudate pueri
3. Surrexit pastor bonus

"Veni Domine" (Come, O Lord our God) is a setting of a Latin verse for the Fourth Sunday in Advent. It is a setting in G minor for three voices (SSA) and organ. The duration is about 4 minutes.

"Laudate pueri Dominum" (O ye that serve the Lord) is a setting of two psalm verses, Psalm 113:2 and Psalm 128:1, in Latin. The first verse is set in E-flat major marked Allegro moderato assai, the second in A-flat major marked Adagio. Both are scored for solo and choir voices (SSA) and organ. The motet takes about 6 minutes to perform.

"Surrexit pastor bonus" (The Shepherd blest is risen) is a setting of a Latin hymn for the Sunday of the Good Shepherd. It is based on the reference to Jesus as the Good Shepherd in the Gospel of John (10:12,13,15). Set in G major, it is written in four sections for four solo and choral voices (SSAA) and organ. The final section is an Alleluja building to eight voices. The motet takes about 9 minutes to perform.

== Recordings ==
The motets were recorded in 2005 by the Kammerchor Stuttgart, conducted by Frieder Bernius, in volume 7 of a complete recording of Mendelssohn's sacred music in 10 volumes. A reviewer noted "the masterly singing of captivating reverence ... from the women of the Stuttgart choir". Previously, the motets were performed by the Westphalian Kantorei in the early 1970s, conducted by Wilhelm Ehmann. The recording of these performances was released commercially in 1972 on the Three Centuries of Musick record label.
