= Violin Sonata No. 2 (Stanford) =

Violin Sonata
- No. 2
- by Charles Villiers Stanford
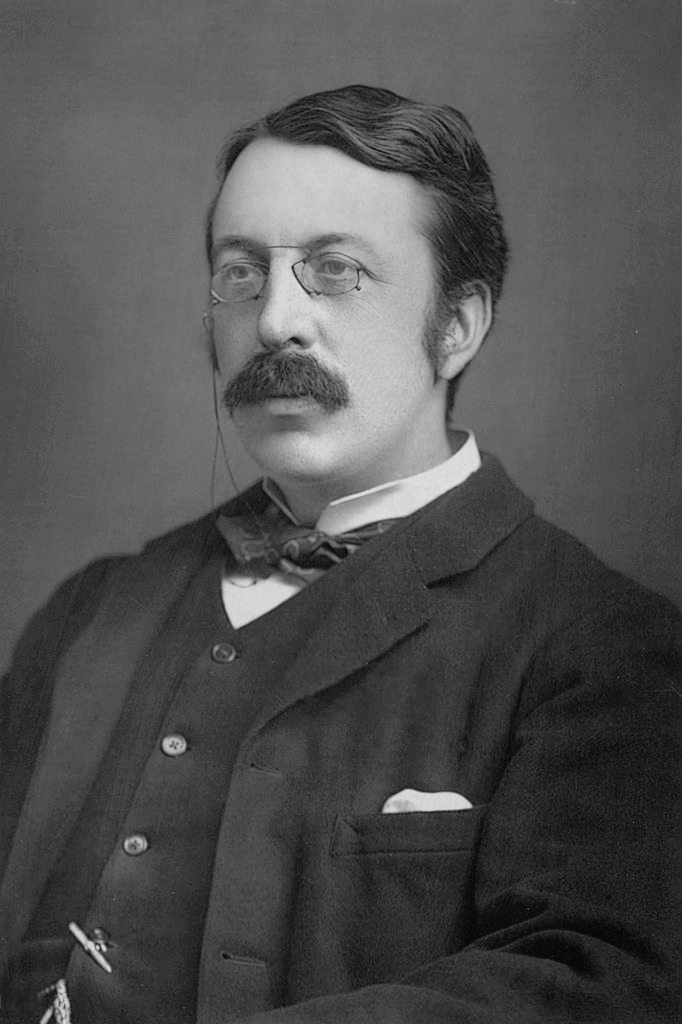
- Stanford in 1894
- Key: A major
- Opus: 70
- Composed: c. 1898
- Published: 2006
- Movements: 4

Charles Villiers Stanford's Violin Sonata No. 2 in A major, Op. 70, was composed around 1898. (Note: The anonymous reviewer who wrote for the Musical Standard indicated in his review he had heard the sonata had been composed around 1896, but offered no source for this information.) Performed only once during the composer's lifetime, the sonata remained unpublished until 2006.

== History ==
The exact circumstances under which this sonata, which only survives in the form of a copy made for the Royal College of Music (RCM), was written is unknown. Biographer Jeremy Dibble notes that it may have been written for Richard Gompertz or for Enrique Fernández Arbós, who ultimately became the dedicatee of the composer's Violin Concerto, Op. 74, both colleagues at the RCM. The only known performance of the sonata during the composer's lifetime took place in London on 7 December 1898 at the Prince's Galleries, Piccadilly, under the auspices of the Curtius Club. The soloists for the performance were Australian-born violinist Joseph Kreuse and pianist Viola Fischer-Sobell. John France located several reviews of this concert, most of which were favorable; one exception was the anonymous review published in The Musical Standard the day after the concert. The reviewer, while liking the work in general, felt that the finale was too close in character to the preceding movement to be completely effective.

There is no documentary evidence of subsequent performances until the work was recorded by Hyperion in 1999 for an album featuring both of the composer's violin sonatas. Publication ultimately took place in 2006, with a version edited by Richard Barnes and released by Cathedral Music, an imprint of the Royal School of Church Music. A second recording was made in 2013 by violinist Alberto Bologni and pianist Christopher Howell as part of a collection of the complete works by Stanford for the instruments.

== Structure ==
The sonata, unlike the composer's first violin sonata, is in four movements:

1. Allegro comodo
2. Adagio molto
3. Prestissimo
4. Allegretto – Animato

An average performance takes around 25–28 minutes.
