= Symphony No. 1 (Stanford) =

Symphony No. 1 in B♭ major was the first symphony composed by Charles Villiers Stanford an Irish composer, music teacher, and conductor. It was written in 1876 to compete for a prize offered by the proprietors of the Alexandra Palace. It came second out of 46 entries earning a prize of £5. The symphony was dedicated to the tenor Arthur Duke Coleridge who had been a friend of Stanford's at Cambridge. It was first played at The Crystal Palace in London in 1879 but was never published or performed again in Stanford's lifetime.

According to Stanford's biographer, Jeremy Dibble, the work shows influences from Schumann's Rhenish Symphony, not only in the Ländler trios of the second movement but also in Stanford's effective use of "quasi-archaic" passages in the first and last movements to convey a sense of solemn intensity.

== Movements ==
There are four movements:

1. Larghetto – Allegro vivace
2. Scherzo: Ländler tempo (Trio 1: Presto, Trio 2: Poco più lento)
3. Andante tranquillo
4. Finale: Allegro molto

== Recordings ==
- Stanford Symphonies, Volume 4. Bournemouth Symphony Orchestra conducted by David Lloyd-Jones (combined with Stanford's Clarinet Concerto in A Minor, Op. 80). Label: Naxos
- Stanford: Symphony No. 1 in B flat major. Ulster Orchestra conducted by Vernon Handley (combined with Stanford's Irish Rhapsody for orchestra No 2 in F minor, Op. 84). Label: Chandos
