= Jeremy Dibble =

English musicologist (born 1958)

Jeremy Dibble is a British musicologist. He is (at 2021) a professor of musicology at Durham University. He works in the university's department of music having been appointed as a lecturer there in 1993. Before this he was a lecturer at University College, Cork. His studies were at Trinity College, Cambridge and at Southampton University. He has published extensively on a wide range of topics in the fields of British nineteenth and twentieth century composition, criticism and aesthetics.

His publications include:

- (1992, rev 1998) C. Hubert H. Parry: His Life and Music, Oxford: OUP
- (2002) Charles Villiers Stanford: Man and Musician, Oxford: OUP
- (2007) John Stainer: A Life in Music, Woodbridge: Boydell & Brewer
- (2010) Michele Esposito, Dublin: Field Day Press
- (2013) Hamilton Harty: Musical Polymath, Woodbridge: Boydell & Brewer
- With Julian Horton (2018) British musical criticism and intellectual thought, 1850-1950, Woodbridge The Boydell Press
- (2021) The Music of Frederick Delius: Style, Form and Ethos, Woodbridge: Boydell and Brewer
