= Shamus O'Brien (opera) =

Opera by Charles Villiers Stanford

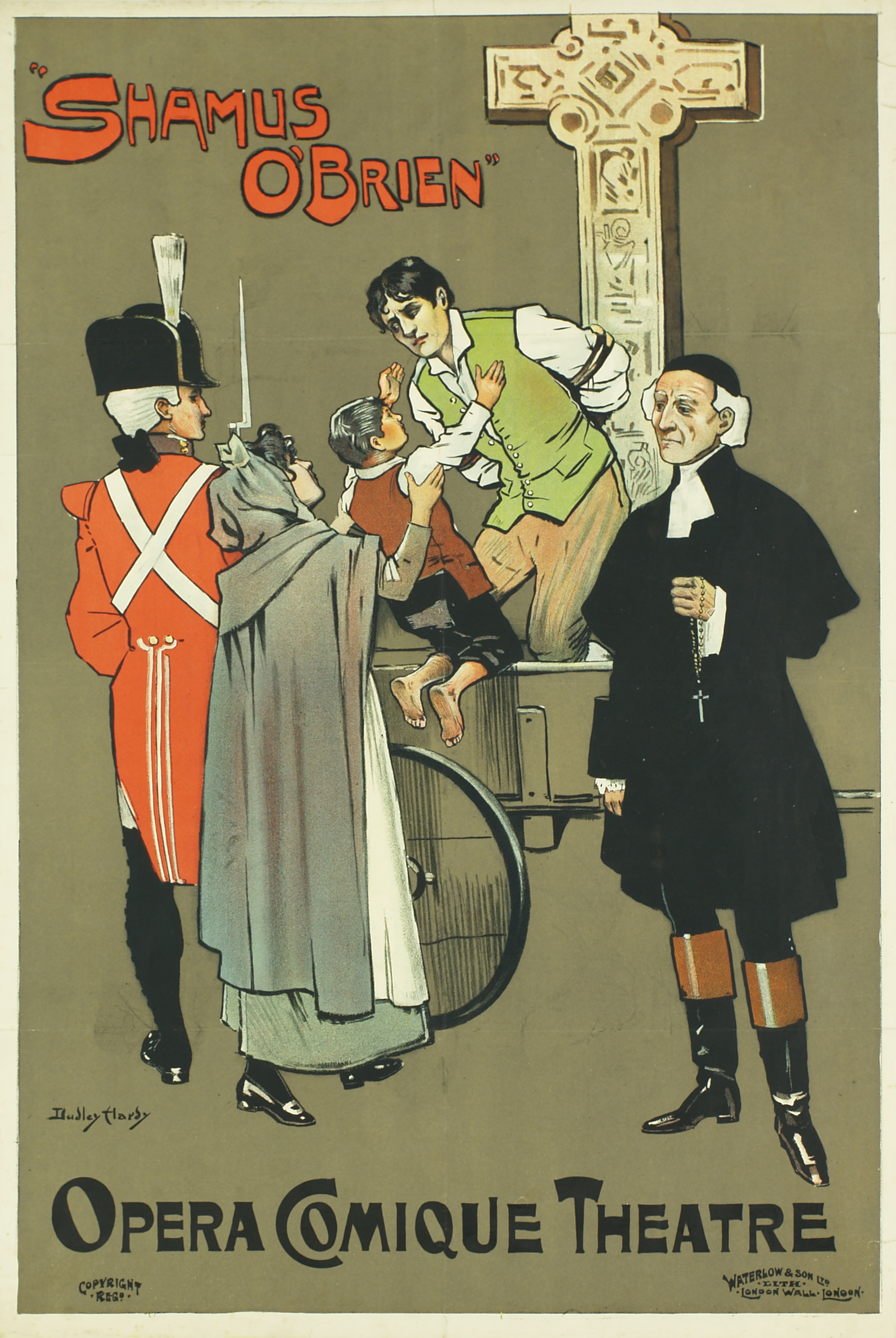
Poster advertising Shamus O'Brien at the Opera Comique

Shamus O'Brien is an 1896 opera by Charles Villiers Stanford, to a libretto based on the poem of the same name by Joseph Sheridan Le Fanu.

The opera is set in the Cork mountains during the Irish Rebellion of 1798 and was enormously popular, though the work was withdrawn by Stanford in the years leading up to the Easter Rising.

== Recording ==
Shamus O'Brien Brendan Collins (Shamus O’Brien), Gemma Ni Bhriain/Anna Brady (Nora O’Brien), Rory Dunne (Father O’Flynn), Ami Hewitt (Kitty), Andrew Gavin (Mike Murphy), Joseph Doody (Captain Trevor), Catriona Clark (The Banshee), David Parry (Sergeant Cox), Jarlath Henderson (Uilleann pipes) Orchestra of Scottish Opera, David Parry. Retrospect Opera 2CD 2024.
