= List of airports by IATA code: L =

The DST column shows the months in which Daylight Saving Time, a.k.a. Summer Time, begins and ends. A blank DST box usually indicates that the location stays on Standard Time all year, although in some cases the location stays on Summer Time all year. If a location is currently on DST, add one hour to the time in the Time column.

IATA	ICAO	Airport name	Location served	Time	DST
-LA-
LAA	KLAA	Lamar Municipal Airport	Lamar, Colorado, United States	UTC−07:00	Mar-Nov
LAB		Lab Lab Airport	Lab Lab, Papua New Guinea	UTC+10:00	
LAC		Layang-Layang Airport (Swallow Reef Airport)	Layang-Layang Island, Sabah, Malaysia	UTC+08:00	
LAD	FNLU	Quatro de Fevereiro Airport	Luanda, Angola	UTC+01:00	
LAE	AYNZ	Lae Nadzab Airport	Lae, Papua New Guinea	UTC+10:00	
LAF	KLAF	Purdue University Airport	Lafayette, Indiana, United States	UTC−05:00	Mar-Nov
LAH	WAPH	Oesman Sadik Airport	Labuha, Indonesia	UTC+09:00	
LAI	LFRO	Lannion – Côte de Granit Airport	Lannion, Brittany, France	UTC+01:00	Mar-Oct
LAJ	SBLJ	Antônio Correia Pinto de Macedo Airport	Lages, Santa Catarina, Brazil	UTC−03:00	
LAK	CYKD	Aklavik/Freddie Carmichael Airport	Aklavik, Northwest Territories, Canada	UTC−07:00	Mar-Nov
LAL	KLAL	Lakeland Linder International Airport	Lakeland, Florida, United States	UTC−05:00	Mar-Nov
LAM	KLAM	Los Alamos County Airport	Los Alamos, New Mexico, United States	UTC−07:00	Mar-Nov
LAN	KLAN	Capital Region International Airport	Lansing, Michigan, United States	UTC−05:00	Mar-Nov
LAO	RPLI	Laoag International Airport	Laoag, Philippines	UTC+08:00	
LAP	MMLP	Manuel Márquez de León International Airport	La Paz, Baja California Sur, Mexico	UTC−07:00	Apr-Oct
LAQ	HLLQ	Al Abraq International Airport	Bayda, Libya	UTC+02:00	
LAR	KLAR	Laramie Regional Airport	Laramie, Wyoming, United States	UTC−07:00	Mar-Nov
LAS	KLAS	Harry Reid International Airport	Las Vegas, Nevada, United States	UTC−08:00	Mar-Nov
LAU	HKLU	Manda Airport	Lamu, Kenya	UTC+03:00	
LAW	KLAW	Lawton–Fort Sill Regional Airport	Lawton, Oklahoma, United States	UTC−06:00	Mar-Nov
LAX	KLAX	Los Angeles International Airport	Los Angeles, California, United States	UTC−08:00	Mar-Nov
LAY	FALY	Ladysmith Airport	Ladysmith, South Africa	UTC+02:00	
LAZ	SBLP	Bom Jesus da Lapa Airport	Bom Jesus da Lapa, Bahia, Brazil	UTC−03:00	
-LB-
LBA	EGNM	Leeds Bradford Airport	Leeds / Bradford, England, United Kingdom	UTC±00:00	Mar-Oct
LBB	KLBB	Lubbock Preston Smith International Airport	Lubbock, Texas, United States	UTC−06:00	Mar-Nov
LBC	EDHL	Lübeck Airport	Lübeck, Schleswig-Holstein, Germany	UTC+01:00	Mar-Oct
LBD	UTDL	Khujand Airport	Khujand, Tajikistan	UTC+05:00	
LBE	KLBE	Arnold Palmer Regional Airport	Latrobe, Pennsylvania, United States	UTC−05:00	Mar-Nov
LBF	KLBF	North Platte Regional Airport (Lee Bird Field)	North Platte, Nebraska, United States	UTC−06:00	Mar-Nov
LBG	LFPB	Paris–Le Bourget Airport	Paris, Île-de-France, France	UTC+01:00	Mar-Oct
LBH		Palm Beach Water Airport	Palm Beach, New South Wales, Australia	UTC+10:00	Oct-Apr
LBI	LFCI	Le Sequestre Airport	Albi, Midi-Pyrénées, France	UTC+01:00	Mar-Oct
LBJ	WATO	Komodo Airport	Labuan Bajo, Indonesia	UTC+08:00	
LBK		Liboi Airport	Liboi, Kenya	UTC+03:00	
LBL	KLBL	Liberal Mid-America Regional Airport	Liberal, Kansas, United States	UTC−06:00	Mar-Nov
LBM		Luabo Airport	Luabo, Mozambique	UTC+02:00	
LBN		Lake Baringo Airport	Lake Baringo, Kenya	UTC+03:00	
LBO	FZVI	Lusambo Airport	Lusambo, Democratic Republic of the Congo	UTC+02:00	
LBP		Long Banga Airport	Long Banga, Sarawak, Malaysia	UTC+08:00	
LBQ	FOGR	Lambaréné Airport	Lambaréné, Gabon	UTC+01:00	
LBR	SWLB	Lábrea Airport	Lábrea, Amazonas, Brazil	UTC−04:00	
LBS	NFNL	Labasa Airport	Labasa, Fiji	UTC+12:00	Nov-Jan
LBT	KLBT	Lumberton Municipal Airport	Lumberton, North Carolina, United States	UTC−05:00	Mar-Nov
LBU	WBKL	Labuan Airport	Labuan, Malaysia	UTC+08:00	
LBV	FOOL	Libreville International Airport	Libreville, Gabon	UTC+01:00	
LBW	WRLB	Juvai Semaring Airport (Long Bawan Airport)	Long Bawan, Indonesia	UTC+08:00	
LBX	RPLU	Lubang Airport	Lubang, Philippines	UTC+08:00	
LBY	LFRE	La Baule-Escoublac Airport	La Baule-Escoublac, Pays de la Loire, France	UTC+01:00	Mar-Oct
LBZ	FNLK	Lucapa Airport	Lucapa, Angola	UTC+01:00	
-LC-
LCA	LCLK	Larnaca International Airport	Larnaca, Cyprus	UTC+02:00	Mar-Oct
LCB		Pontes e Lacerda Airport	Pontes e Lacerda, Mato Grosso, Brazil	UTC−04:00	
LCC	LIBN	Galatina Air Base	Lecce, Apulia, Italy	UTC+01:00	Mar-Oct
LCD	FALO	Louis Trichardt Airport	Louis Trichardt, South Africa	UTC+02:00	
LCE	MHLC	Golosón International Airport	La Ceiba, Honduras	UTC−06:00	
LCF	MGRD	Río Dulce Airport (Las Vegas Airport)	Río Dulce, Guatemala	UTC−06:00	
LCG	LECO	A Coruña Airport	A Coruña, Galicia, Spain	UTC+01:00	Mar-Oct
LCH	KLCH	Lake Charles Regional Airport	Lake Charles, Louisiana, United States	UTC−06:00	Mar-Nov
LCI	KLCI	Laconia Municipal Airport	Laconia, New Hampshire, United States	UTC−05:00	Mar-Nov
LCJ	EPLL	Łódź Władysław Reymont Airport	Łódź, Poland	UTC+01:00	Mar-Oct
LCK	KLCK	Rickenbacker International Airport	Columbus, Ohio, United States	UTC−05:00	Mar-Nov
LCL	MULM	La Coloma Airport	Pinar del Río, Cuba	UTC−05:00	Mar-Nov
LCM	SACC	La Cumbre Airport	La Cumbre, Córdoba, Argentina	UTC−03:00	
LCN	YBLC	Balcanoona Airport	Balcanoona, South Australia, Australia	UTC+09:30	Oct-Apr
LCO	FCBL	Lague Airport	Lague, Republic of the Congo	UTC+01:00	
LCP		Loncopué Airport	Loncopué, Neuquén, Argentina	UTC−03:00	
LCQ	KLCQ	Lake City Gateway Airport	Lake City, Florida, United States	UTC−05:00	Mar-Nov
LCR		La Chorrera Airport	La Chorrera, Colombia	UTC−05:00	
LCT		Shijiazhuang Luancheng Airport	Shijiazhuang, Hebei, China	UTC+08:00	
LCV	LIQL	Lucca-Tassignano Airport	Lucca, Tuscany, Italy	UTC+01:00	Mar-Oct
LCX	ZSLD	Longyan Guanzhishan Airport	Longyan, Fujian, China	UTC+08:00	
LCY	EGLC	London City Airport	London, England, United Kingdom	UTC±00:00	Mar-Oct
-LD-
LDA	VEMH	Malda Airport	Malda, West Bengal, India	UTC+05:30	
LDB	SBLO	Londrina–Governador José Richa Airport	Londrina, Paraná, Brazil	UTC−03:00	
LDC	YLIN	Lindeman Island Airport	Lindeman Island, Queensland, Australia	UTC+10:00	
LDE	LFBT	Tarbes–Lourdes–Pyrénées Airport	Tarbes / Lourdes, Midi-Pyrénées, France	UTC+01:00	Mar-Oct
LDG	ULAL	Leshukonskoye Airport	Leshukonskoye, Arkhangelsk Oblast, Russia	UTC+03:00	
LDH	YLHI	Lord Howe Island Airport	Lord Howe Island, New South Wales, Australia	UTC+10:30	Oct-Apr^{1}
LDI	HTLI	Lindi Airport (Kikwetu Airport)	Lindi, Tanzania	UTC+03:00	
LDJ	KLDJ	Linden Airport	Linden, New Jersey, United States	UTC−05:00	Mar-Nov
LDK	ESGL	Lidköping-Hovby Airport	Lidköping, Sweden	UTC+01:00	Mar-Oct
LDM	KLDM	Mason County Airport	Ludington, Michigan, United States	UTC−05:00	Mar-Nov
LDN	VNLD	Lamidanda Airport	Lamidanda, Nepal	UTC+05:45	
LDO	SMDO	Laduani Airstrip	Aurora, Suriname	UTC−03:00	
LDR		Lawdar Airport	Lawdar, Yemen	UTC+03:00	
LDS	ZYLD	Yichun Lindu Airport	Yichun, Heilongjiang, China	UTC+08:00	
LDU	WBKD	Lahad Datu Airport	Lahad Datu, Sabah, Malaysia	UTC+08:00	
LDV	LFRJ	Landivisiau Air Base	Landivisiau, Brittany, France	UTC+01:00	Mar-Oct
LDW		Lansdowne Airport	Lansdowne, Western Australia, Australia	UTC+08:00	
LDX	SOOM	Saint-Laurent-du-Maroni Airport	Saint-Laurent-du-Maroni, French Guiana	UTC−03:00	
LDY	EGAE	City of Derry Airport	Derry, Northern Ireland, United Kingdom	UTC±00:00	Mar-Oct
LDZ	FALD	Londolozi Airport	Londolozi, South Africa	UTC+02:00	
-LE-
LEA	YPLM	Learmonth Airport	Exmouth, Western Australia, Australia	UTC+08:00	
LEB	KLEB	Lebanon Municipal Airport	Lebanon / Hanover, New Hampshire, United States	UTC−05:00	Mar-Nov
LEC	SBLE	Coronel Horácio de Mattos Airport	Lençóis, Bahia, Brazil	UTC−03:00	
LED	ULLI	Pulkovo Airport	Saint Petersburg, Russia	UTC+03:00	
LEE	KLEE	Leesburg International Airport	Leesburg, Florida, United States	UTC−05:00	Mar-Nov
LEF	FXLK	Lebakeng Airport	Lebakeng, Lesotho	UTC+02:00	
LEG		Aleg Airport	Aleg, Mauritania	UTC±00:00	
LEH	LFOH	Le Havre – Octeville Airport	Le Havre, Upper Normandy, France	UTC+01:00	Mar-Oct
LEI	LEAM	Almería Airport	Almería, Andalusia, Spain	UTC+01:00	Mar-Oct
LEJ	EDDP	Leipzig/Halle Airport	Leipzig, Saxony / Halle, Saxony-Anhalt,^{2} Germany	UTC+01:00	Mar-Oct
LEK	GULB	Tata Airport	Labé, Guinea	UTC±00:00	
LEL	YLEV	Lake Evella Airport	Gapuwiyak, Northern Territory, Australia	UTC+09:30	
LEM	KLEM	Lemmon Municipal Airport	Lemmon, South Dakota, United States	UTC−07:00	Mar-Nov
LEN	LELN	León Airport	León, Castile and León, Spain	UTC+01:00	Mar-Oct
LEO		Lékoni Airport	Lékoni, Gabon	UTC+01:00	
LEP	SNDN	Leopoldina Airport	Leopoldina, Minas Gerais, Brazil	UTC−03:00	
LEQ	EGHC	Land's End Airport	St Just, England, United Kingdom	UTC±00:00	Mar-Oct
LER	YLST	Leinster Airport	Leinster, Western Australia, Australia	UTC+08:00	
LES	FXLS	Lesobeng Airport	Lesobeng, Lesotho	UTC+02:00	
LET	SKLT	Alfredo Vásquez Cobo International Airport	Leticia, Colombia	UTC−05:00	
LEU	LESU	La Seu d'Urgell Airport	La Seu d'Urgell, Catalonia, Spain	UTC+01:00	Mar-Oct
LEV	NFNB	Levuka Airfield (Bureta Airport)	Levuka, Ovalau Island, Fiji	UTC+12:00	Nov-Jan
LEW	KLEW	Auburn/Lewiston Municipal Airport	Auburn / Lewiston, Maine, United States	UTC−05:00	Mar-Nov
LEX	KLEX	Blue Grass Airport	Lexington, Kentucky, United States	UTC−05:00	Mar-Nov
LEY	EHLE	Lelystad Airport	Lelystad, Netherlands	UTC+01:00	Mar-Oct
LEZ	MHLE	La Esperanza Airport	La Esperanza, Honduras	UTC−06:00	
-LF-
LFB	FQLU	Lumbo Airport	Lumbo, Mozambique	UTC+02:00	
LFI	KLFI	Langley Air Force Base	Hampton, Virginia, United States	UTC−05:00	Mar-Nov
LFK	KLFK	Angelina County Airport	Lufkin, Texas, United States	UTC−06:00	Mar-Nov
LFM	OISR	Lamerd Airport	Lamerd, Iran	UTC+03:30	Mar-Sep
LFN	KLHZ	Triangle North Executive Airport (Franklin County Airport) (FAA: LHZ)	Louisburg, North Carolina, United States	UTC−05:00	Mar-Nov
LFO	HAKL	Kelafo Airport	Kelafo, Ethiopia	UTC+03:00	
LFP	YLFD	Lakefield Airport	Lakefield, Queensland, Australia	UTC+10:00	
LFQ		Linfen Qiaoli Airport	Linfen, Shanxi, China	UTC+08:00	
LFR	SVLF	La Fría Airport	La Fría, Venezuela	UTC−04:00	
LFT	KLFT	Lafayette Regional Airport	Lafayette, Louisiana, United States	UTC−06:00	Mar-Nov
LFW	DXXX	Lomé–Tokoin Airport (Gnassingbé Eyadéma Int'l)	Lomé, Togo	UTC±00:00	
-LG-
LGA	KLGA	LaGuardia Airport	New York City, New York, United States	UTC−05:00	Mar-Nov
LGB	KLGB	Long Beach Airport	Long Beach, California, United States	UTC−08:00	Mar-Nov
LGC	KLGC	LaGrange Callaway Airport	LaGrange, Georgia, United States	UTC−05:00	Mar-Nov
LGD	KLGD	La Grande/Union County Airport	La Grande, Oregon, United States	UTC−08:00	Mar-Nov
LGE		Lake Gregory Airport	Lake Gregory, Western Australia, Australia	UTC+08:00	
LGF	KLGF	Laguna Army Airfield	Yuma Proving Ground, Arizona, United States	UTC−07:00	
LGG	EBLG	Liège Airport	Liège, Belgium	UTC+01:00	Mar-Oct
LGH	YLEC	Leigh Creek Airport	Leigh Creek, South Australia, Australia	UTC+09:30	Oct-Apr
LGI	MYLD	Deadman's Cay Airport	Deadman's Cay, Long Island, Bahamas	UTC−05:00	Mar-Nov
LGK	WMKL	Langkawi International Airport	Langkawi, Kedah, Malaysia	UTC+08:00	
LGL	WBGF	Long Lellang Airport	Long Lellang, Sarawak, Malaysia	UTC+08:00	
LGM		Laiagam Airport	Laiagam, Papua New Guinea	UTC+10:00	
LGN		Linga Linga Airport	Linga Linga, Papua New Guinea	UTC+10:00	
LGO	EDWL	Langeoog Airport	Langeoog, Lower Saxony, Germany	UTC+01:00	
LGQ	SENL	Lago Agrio Airport	Nueva Loja (Lago Agrio), Ecuador	UTC−05:00	
LGR	SCHR	Cochrane Airfield	Cochrane, Chile	UTC−04:00	Aug-May
LGS	SAMM	Comodoro D. Ricardo Salomón Airport	Malargüe, Mendoza, Argentina	UTC−03:00	
LGT	SKGA	Las Gaviotas Airport	Gaviotas, Colombia	UTC−05:00	
LGU	KLGU	Logan-Cache Airport	Logan, Utah, United States	UTC−07:00	Mar-Nov
LGW	EGKK	Gatwick Airport	London, England, United Kingdom	UTC±00:00	Mar-Oct
LGX	HCMJ	Lugh Ganane Airport	Lugh Ganane (Luuq), Somalia	UTC+03:00	
LGY		Lagunillas Airport	Lagunillas, Venezuela	UTC−04:00	
-LH-
LHA	EDTL	Flughafen Lahr (Lahr Airport)	Lahr, Baden-Württemberg, Germany	UTC+01:00	Mar-Oct
LHE	OPLA	Allama Iqbal International Airport	Lahore, Pakistan	UTC+05:00	
LHG	YLRD	Lightning Ridge Airport	Lightning Ridge, New South Wales, Australia	UTC+10:00	Oct-Apr
LHI	WAJL	Lereh Airport	Lereh, Indonesia	UTC+09:00	
LHK	ZHGH	Laohekou Airport	Laohekou, Hubei, China	UTC+08:00	
LHP		Lehu Airport	Lehu, Papua New Guinea	UTC+11:00	
LHR	EGLL	Heathrow Airport	London, England, United Kingdom	UTC±00:00	Mar-Oct
LHS	SAVH	Las Heras Airport	Las Heras, Santa Cruz, Argentina	UTC−03:00	
LHU	FYLS	Lianshulu Airport	Lianshulu, Namibia	UTC+01:00	Sep-Apr
LHV	KLHV	William T. Piper Memorial Airport	Lock Haven, Pennsylvania, United States	UTC−05:00	Mar-Nov
LHW	ZLLL	Lanzhou Zhongchuan International Airport	Lanzhou, Gansu, China	UTC+08:00	
-LI-
LIA	ZULP	Liangping Airport	Liangping, Chongqing, China	UTC+08:00	
LIB		Limbunya Airport	Limbunya Station, Northern Territory, Australia	UTC+09:30	
LIC	KLIC	Limon Municipal Airport	Limon, Colorado, United States	UTC−07:00	Mar-Nov
LIE	FZFA	Libenge Airport	Libenge, Democratic Republic of the Congo	UTC+01:00	
LIF	NWWL	Ouanaham Airport	Lifou, Loyalty Islands, New Caledonia	UTC+11:00	
LIG	LFBL	Limoges – Bellegarde Airport	Limoges, Limousin, France	UTC+01:00	Mar-Oct
LIH	PHLI	Lihue Airport	Lihue, Hawaii, United States	UTC−10:00	
LII	WAJM	Mulia Airport	Mulia, Indonesia	UTC+09:00	
LIJ	ZSLI	Lishui Airport	Lishui, Zhejiang, China	UTC+08:00	
LIK		Likiep Airport	Likiep Atoll, Marshall Islands	UTC+12:00	
LIL	LFQQ	Lille Airport (Lille–Lesquin Airport)	Lille, Nord-Pas-de-Calais, France	UTC+01:00	Mar-Oct
LIM	SPJC	Jorge Chávez International Airport	Lima, Peru	UTC−05:00	
LIN	LIML	Linate Airport	Milan, Lombardy, Italy	UTC+01:00	Mar-Oct
LIO	MRLM	Limón International Airport	Limón, Costa Rica	UTC−06:00	
LIP	SBLN	Lins Airport	Lins, São Paulo, Brazil	UTC−03:00	
LIQ	FZGA	Lisala Airport	Lisala, Democratic Republic of the Congo	UTC+01:00	
LIR	MRLB	Daniel Oduber Quirós International Airport	Liberia, Costa Rica	UTC−06:00	
LIS	LPPT	Lisbon Portela Airport	Lisbon, Portugal	UTC±00:00	Mar-Oct
LIT	KLIT	Clinton National Airport (Adams Field)	Little Rock, Arkansas, United States	UTC−06:00	Mar-Nov
LIV		Livengood Camp Airport (FAA: 4AK)	Livengood, Alaska, United States	UTC−09:00	Mar-Nov
LIW	VYLK	Loikaw Airport	Loikaw, Myanmar	UTC+06:30	
LIX	FWLK	Likoma Airport	Likoma Island, Malawi	UTC+02:00	
LIY	KLHW	MidCoast Regional Airport at Wright Army Airfield (FAA: LHW)	Fort Stewart / Hinesville, Georgia, United States	UTC−05:00	Mar-Nov
LIZ		Loring International Airport (FAA: ME16)	Limestone, Maine, United States	UTC−05:00	Mar-Nov
-LJ-
LJA	FZVA	Lodja Airport	Lodja, Democratic Republic of the Congo	UTC+02:00	
LJG	ZPLJ	Lijiang Sanyi Airport	Lijiang, Yunnan, China	UTC+08:00	
LJN	KLBX	Texas Gulf Coast Regional Airport (FAA: LBX)	Angleton / Lake Jackson, Texas, United States	UTC−06:00	Mar-Nov
LJU	LJLJ	Ljubljana Jože Pučnik Airport (Brnik Airport)	Ljubljana, Slovenia	UTC+01:00	Mar-Oct
-LK-
LKA	WATL	Gewayantana Airport	Larantuka, Indonesia	UTC+08:00	
LKB	NFNK	Lakeba Airport	Lakeba Island, Fiji	UTC+12:00	Nov-Jan
LKC		Lekana Airport	Lekana, Republic of the Congo	UTC+01:00	
LKD	YLND	Lakeland Downs Airport	Lakeland Downs, Queensland, Australia	UTC+10:00	
LKE		Kenmore Air Harbor Seaplane Base (Seattle Lake Union SPB) (FAA: W55)	Seattle, Washington, United States	UTC−08:00	Mar-Nov
LKG	HKLK	Lokichogio Airport	Lokichogio, Kenya	UTC+03:00	
LKH	WBGL	Long Akah Airport	Long Akah, Sarawak, Malaysia	UTC+08:00	
LKI	WITG	Lasikin Airport	Sinabang, Aceh, Indonesia	UTC+07:00	
LKK	PAKL	Kulik Lake Airport	Kulik Lake, Alaska, United States	UTC−09:00	Mar-Nov
LKL	ENNA	Lakselv Airport, Banak	Lakselv, Norway	UTC+01:00	Mar-Oct
LKN	ENLK	Leknes Airport	Leknes, Norway	UTC+01:00	Mar-Oct
LKO	VILK	Chaudhary Charan Singh International Airport	Lucknow, Uttar Pradesh, India	UTC+05:30	
LKP	KLKP	Lake Placid Airport	Lake Placid, New York, United States	UTC−05:00	Mar-Nov
LKR		Las Khorey Airport	Las Khorey (Laasqoray), Somalia	UTC+03:00	
LKU		Lake Turkana Airport	Lake Turkana, Kenya	UTC+03:00	
LKV	KLKV	Lake County Airport	Lakeview, Oregon, United States	UTC−08:00	Mar-Nov
LKW	OOLK	Lekhwair Airport	Lekhwair, Oman	UTC+04:00	
LKY	HTLM	Lake Manyara Airport	Lake Manyara, Tanzania	UTC+03:00	
LKZ	EGUL	RAF Lakenheath	Brandon, England, United Kingdom	UTC±00:00	Mar-Oct
-LL-
LLA	ESPA	Luleå/Kallax Airport	Luleå, Sweden	UTC+01:00	Mar-Oct
LLB	ZULB	Libo Airport (Qiannan Airport)	Libo, Guizhou, China	UTC+08:00	
LLC	RPLH	Cagayan North International Airport (Lal-lo Airport)	Lal-lo, Philippines	UTC+08:00	
LLE	FAMN	Malelane Airport	Malalane, South Africa	UTC+02:00	
LLF	ZGLG	Yongzhou Lingling Airport	Yongzhou, Hunan, China	UTC+08:00	
LLG	YCGO	Chillagoe Airport	Chillagoe, Queensland, Australia	UTC+10:00	
LLH		Las Limas Airport	Las Limas, Honduras	UTC−06:00	
LLI	HALL	Lalibela Airport	Lalibela, Ethiopia	UTC+03:00	
LLJ	WIPB	Silampari Airport	Lubuklinggau, South Sumatra, Indonesia	UTC+09:00	
LLK	UBBL	Lankaran International Airport	Lankaran, Azerbaijan	UTC+04:00	
LLL		Lissadell Airport	Lissadell, Western Australia, Australia	UTC+08:00	
LLM		Lomlom Airport	Lomlom, Reef Islands, Solomon Islands		
LLN	WAJV	Kelila Airport	Kelila, Indonesia	UTC+09:00	
LLO		Palopo Lagaligo Airport	Palopo, Indonesia	UTC+08:00	
LLP		Linda Downs Airport	Linda Downs, Queensland, Australia	UTC+10:00	
LLS	SATK	Alférez Armando Rodríguez Airport	Las Lomitas, Formosa, Argentina	UTC−03:00	
LLT	FNLB	Lobito Airport	Lobito, Angola	UTC+01:00	
LLV	ZBLL	Lüliang Airport	Lüliang, Shanxi, China	UTC+08:00	
LLW	FWKI	Lilongwe International Airport (Kamuzu Int'l)	Lilongwe, Malawi	UTC+02:00	
LLX	KCDA	Caledonia County Airport (FAA: CDA)	Lyndonville, Vermont, United States	UTC−05:00	Mar-Nov
LLY	KVAY	South Jersey Regional Airport (FAA: VAY)	Mount Holly, New Jersey, United States	UTC−05:00	Mar-Nov
-LM-
LMA	PAMH	Lake Minchumina Airport (FAA: MHM)	Lake Minchumina, Alaska, United States	UTC−09:00	Mar-Nov
LMB	FWSM	Salima Airport	Salima, Malawi	UTC+02:00	
LMC	SKNA	La Macarena Airport	La Macarena, Colombia	UTC−05:00	
LMD		Los Menucos Airport	Los Menucos, Río Negro, Argentina	UTC−03:00	
LME	LFRM	Le Mans Arnage Airport	Le Mans, Pays de la Loire, France	UTC+01:00	Mar-Oct
LMG		Lamassa Airport	Lamassa, Papua New Guinea	UTC+10:00	
LMH		Limón Airport	Limón, Honduras	UTC−06:00	
LMI		Lumi Airport	Lumi, Papua New Guinea	UTC+10:00	
LML		Lae Airport	Lae Atoll, Marshall Islands	UTC+12:00	
LMM	MMLM	Fort Valley Federal International Airport	Los Mochis, Sinaloa, Mexico	UTC−07:00	Apr-Oct
LMN	WBGJ	Limbang Airport	Limbang, Sarawak, Malaysia	UTC+08:00	
LMO	EGQS	RAF Lossiemouth	Lossiemouth, Scotland, United Kingdom	UTC±00:00	Mar-Oct
LMP	LICD	Lampedusa Airport	Lampedusa, Sicily, Italy	UTC+01:00	Mar-Oct
LMQ	HLMB	Marsa Brega Airport	Brega, Libya	UTC+02:00	
LMR	FALC	Finsch Mine Airport	Lime Acres, South Africa	UTC+02:00	
LMS	KLMS	Louisville Winston County Airport	Louisville, Mississippi, United States	UTC−06:00	Mar-Nov
LMT	KLMT	Klamath Falls Airport	Klamath Falls, Oregon, United States	UTC−08:00	Mar-Nov
LMU	WIDL	Letung Airport	Anambas Islands, Riau Islands, Indonesia	UTC+09:00	Mar-Nov
LMV		Madivaru Airport	Madivaru, Lhaviyani Atoll, Maldives	UTC+05:00	
LMX		Lopéz de Micay Airport	El Trapiche, Colombia	UTC−05:00	
LMY		Lake Murray Airport	Lake Murray, Papua New Guinea	UTC+10:00	
LMZ		Palma Airport	Palma, Mozambique	UTC+02:00	
-LN-
LNA	KLNA	Palm Beach County Park Airport	West Palm Beach, Florida, United States	UTC−05:00	Mar-Nov
LNB	NVSM	Lamen Bay Airport	Lamen Bay, Epi Island, Shefa Province, Vanuatu	UTC+11:00	
LNC		Lengbati Airport	Lengbati, Papua New Guinea	UTC+10:00	
LND	KLND	Hunt Field	Lander, Wyoming, United States	UTC−07:00	Mar-Nov
LNE	NVSO	Lonorore Airport	Lonorore, Pentecost Island, Penama Province, Vanuatu	UTC+11:00	
LNF		Munbil Airport	Munbil, Papua New Guinea	UTC+10:00	
LNG		Lese Airport	Lese, Papua New Guinea	UTC+10:00	
LNH	YLKN	Lake Nash Airport	Alpurrurulam (Lake Nash), Northern Territory, Australia	UTC+09:30	
LNI	PALN	Point Lonely Short Range Radar Site (FAA: AK71)	Lonely, Alaska, United States	UTC−09:00	Mar-Nov
LNJ	ZPLC	Lincang Airport	Lincang, Yunnan, China	UTC+08:00	
LNK	KLNK	Lincoln Airport	Lincoln, Nebraska, United States	UTC−06:00	Mar-Nov
LNL	ZLLN	Longnan Chengzhou Airport	Longnan, Gansu, China	UTC+08:00	
LNM		Langimar Airport	Langimar, Papua New Guinea	UTC+10:00	
LNN	KLNN	Lost Nation Airport	Willoughby, Ohio, United States	UTC−05:00	Mar-Nov
LNO	YLEO	Leonora Airport	Leonora, Western Australia, Australia	UTC+08:00	
LNP	KLNP	Lonesome Pine Airport	Wise, Virginia, United States	UTC−05:00	Mar-Nov
LNQ		Loani Airport	Loani, Papua New Guinea	UTC+10:00	
LNR	KLNR	Tri-County Regional Airport	Lone Rock, Wisconsin, United States	UTC−06:00	Mar-Nov
LNS	KLNS	Lancaster Airport	Lancaster, Pennsylvania, United States	UTC−05:00	Mar-Nov
LNU	WALM	Robert Atty Bessing Airport	Malinau, North Kalimantan, Indonesia	UTC+09:00	
LNV	AYKY	Lihir Island Airport	Lihir Island, Papua New Guinea	UTC+10:00	
LNX	UUBS	Smolensk South Airport	Smolensk, Smolensk Oblast, Russia	UTC+03:00	
LNY	PHNY	Lanai Airport	Lanai City, Hawaii, United States	UTC−10:00	
LNZ	LOWL	Linz Airport (Blue Danube Airport)	Linz, Austria	UTC+01:00	Mar-Oct
-LO-
LOA	YLOR	Lorraine Airport	Lorraine, Queensland, Australia	UTC+10:00	
LOB	SCAN	San Rafael Airport	Los Andes, Chile	UTC−04:00	Aug-May
LOC	YLOK	Lock Airport	Lock, South Australia, Australia	UTC+09:30	Oct-Apr
LOD	NVSG	Longana Airport	Longana, Aoba Island, Penama Province, Vanuatu	UTC+11:00	
LOE	VTUL	Loei Airport	Loei, Thailand	UTC+07:00	
LOF		Loen Airport	Loen Island, Namu Atoll, Marshall Islands	UTC+12:00	
LOH	SETM	Ciudad de Catamayo Airport	Loja, Ecuador	UTC−05:00	
LOI	SSLN	Helmuth Baungartem Airport	Lontras, Santa Catarina, Brazil	UTC−03:00	
LOK	HKLO	Lodwar Airport	Lodwar, Kenya	UTC+03:00	
LOL	KLOL	Derby Field	Lovelock, Nevada, United States	UTC−08:00	Mar-Nov
LOM		Francisco Primo de Verdad National Airport	Lagos de Moreno, Jalisco, Mexico	UTC−06:00	Apr-Oct
LON		metropolitan area^{3}	London, England, United Kingdom	UTC±00:00	Mar-Oct
LOO	DAUL	L'Mekrareg Airport (Laghouat Airport)	Laghouat, Algeria	UTC+01:00	
LOP	WADL	Lombok International Airport	Praya, Indonesia	UTC+08:00	
LOQ	FBLO	Lobatse Airport	Lobatse, Botswana	UTC+02:00	
LOS	DNMM	Murtala Muhammed International Airport	Lagos, Nigeria	UTC+01:00	
LOT	KLOT	Lewis University Airport	Romeoville, Illinois, United States	UTC−06:00	Mar-Nov
LOU	KLOU	Bowman Field	Louisville, Kentucky, United States	UTC−05:00	Mar-Nov
LOV	MMMV	Venustiano Carranza International Airport	Monclova, Coahuila, Mexico	UTC−06:00	Apr-Oct
LOW	KLKU	Louisa County Airport (Freeman Field) (FAA: LKU)	Louisa, Virginia, United States	UTC−05:00	Mar-Nov
LOX		Los Tablones Airport	Los Tablones, Guatemala	UTC−06:00	
LOY	HKLY	Loiyangalani Airport	Loiyangalani, Kenya	UTC+03:00	
LOZ	KLOZ	London-Corbin Airport (Magee Field)	London, Kentucky, United States	UTC−05:00	Mar-Nov
-LP-
LPA	GCLP	Gran Canaria Airport	Gran Canaria, Canary Islands, Spain	UTC±00:00	Mar-Oct
LPB	SLLP	El Alto International Airport	La Paz, Bolivia	UTC−04:00	
LPC	KLPC	Lompoc Airport	Lompoc, California, United States	UTC−08:00	Mar-Nov
LPD	SKLP	La Pedrera Airport	La Pedrera, Colombia	UTC−05:00	
LPE	SKIM	La Primavera Airport	La Primavera, Colombia	UTC−05:00	
LPF	ZUPS	Liupanshui Yuezhao Airport	Liupanshui, Guizhou, China	UTC+08:00	
LPG	SADL	La Plata Airport	La Plata, Buenos Aires, Argentina	UTC−03:00	
LPI	ESSL	Linköping/Saab Airport	Linköping, Sweden	UTC+01:00	Mar-Oct
LPJ	SVAS	Armando Schwarck Airport	Los Pijiguaos, Venezuela	UTC−04:00	
LPK	UUOL	Lipetsk Airport	Lipetsk, Lipetsk Oblast, Russia	UTC+03:00	
LPL	EGGP	Liverpool John Lennon Airport	Liverpool, England, United Kingdom	UTC±00:00	Mar-Oct
LPM	NVSL	Malekoula Airport (Lamap Airport)	Lamap, Malampa, Vanuatu	UTC+11:00	
LPN		Leron Plains Airport	Leron Plains, Papua New Guinea	UTC+10:00	
LPO	KPPO	La Porte Municipal Airport (FAA: PPO)	La Porte, Indiana, United States	UTC−06:00	Mar-Nov
LPP	EFLP	Lappeenranta Airport	Lappeenranta, Finland	UTC+02:00	Mar-Oct
LPQ	VLLB	Luang Prabang International Airport	Luang Prabang, Laos	UTC+07:00	
LPS		Fishermans Bay/LPS Seaplane Base	Lopez Island, Washington, United States	UTC−08:00	Mar-Nov
LPT	VTCL	Lampang Airport	Lampang, Thailand	UTC+07:00	
LPU	WRLP	Long Apung Airport	Long Apung, Indonesia	UTC+08:00	
LPX	EVLA	Liepāja International Airport	Liepāja, Latvia	UTC+02:00	Mar-Oct
LPY	LFHP	Le Puy – Loudes Airport	Le Puy-en-Velay, Auvergne, France	UTC+01:00	Mar-Oct
-LQ-
LQK	KLQK	Pickens County Airport	Pickens, South Carolina, United States	UTC−05:00	Mar-Nov
LQM	SKLG	Caucayá Airport	Puerto Leguízamo, Colombia	UTC−05:00	
LQN	OAQN	Qala i Naw Airport	Qala i Naw, Afghanistan	UTC+04:30	
-LR-
LRA	LGLR	Larissa National Airport	Larissa, Greece	UTC+02:00	Mar-Oct
LRB	FXLR	Leribe Airport	Leribe (Hlotse), Lesotho	UTC+02:00	
LRD	KLRD	Laredo International Airport	Laredo, Texas, United States	UTC−06:00	Mar-Nov
LRE	YLRE	Longreach Airport	Longreach, Queensland, Australia	UTC+10:00	
LRF	KLRF	Little Rock Air Force Base	Jacksonville, Arkansas, United States	UTC−06:00	Mar-Nov
LRG	OPLL	Loralai Airport	Loralai, Pakistan	UTC+05:00	
LRH	LFBH	La Rochelle – Île de Ré Airport	La Rochelle, Poitou-Charentes, France	UTC+01:00	Mar-Oct
LRI		Lorica Airport	Lorica, Colombia	UTC−05:00	
LRJ	KLRJ	Le Mars Municipal Airport	Le Mars, Iowa, United States	UTC−06:00	Mar-Nov
LRL	DXNG	Niamtougou International Airport	Niamtougou, Togo	UTC±00:00	
LRM	MDLR	La Romana International Airport (Casa de Campo International Airport)	La Romana, Dominican Republic	UTC−04:00	
LRQ		Laurie River Airport	Laurie River, Manitoba, Canada	UTC−06:00	Mar-Nov
LRR	OISL	Larestan International Airport	Lar, Iran	UTC+03:30	Mar-Sep
LRS	LGLE	Leros Municipal Airport	Leros, Greece	UTC+02:00	Mar-Oct
LRT	LFRH	Lorient South Brittany Airport (Lann-Bihoué Airport)	Lorient, Brittany, France	UTC+01:00	Mar-Oct
LRU	KLRU	Las Cruces International Airport	Las Cruces, New Mexico, United States	UTC−07:00	Mar-Nov
LRV	SVRS	Los Roques Airport	Los Roques, Venezuela	UTC−04:00	
-LS-
LSA	AYKA	Losuia Airport	Kiriwina Island, Papua New Guinea	UTC+10:00	
LSB	KLSB	Lordsburg Municipal Airport	Lordsburg, New Mexico, United States	UTC−07:00	Mar-Nov
LSC	SCSE	La Florida Airport	La Serena, Chile	UTC−04:00	Aug-May
LSE	KLSE	La Crosse Regional Airport	La Crosse, Wisconsin, United States	UTC−06:00	Mar-Nov
LSF	KLSF	Lawson Army Airfield	Fort Benning / Columbus, Georgia, United States	UTC−05:00	Mar-Nov
LSH	VYLS	Lashio Airport	Lashio, Myanmar	UTC+06:30	
LSI	EGPB	Sumburgh Airport	Shetland Islands, Scotland, United Kingdom	UTC±00:00	Mar-Oct
LSJ		Long Island Airport	Long Island, Papua New Guinea	UTC+10:00	
LSK	KLSK	Lusk Municipal Airport	Lusk, Wyoming, United States	UTC−07:00	Mar-Nov
LSL	MRLC	Los Chiles Airport	Los Chiles, Costa Rica	UTC−06:00	
LSM	WBGD	Long Semado Airport	Long Semado, Sarawak, Malaysia	UTC+08:00	
LSN	KLSN	Los Banos Municipal Airport	Los Banos, California, United States	UTC−08:00	Mar-Nov
LSO	LFOO	Les Sables-d'Olonne – Talmont Airport	Les Sables-d'Olonne, Pays de la Loire, France	UTC+01:00	Mar-Oct
LSP	SVJC	Josefa Camejo International Airport	Punto Fijo, Venezuela	UTC−04:00	
LSQ	SCGE	Maria Dolores Airport	Los Ángeles, Chile	UTC−04:00	Aug-May
LSS	TFFS	Les Saintes Airport	Terre-de-Haut Island, Îles des Saintes, Guadeloupe	UTC−04:00	
LST	YMLT	Launceston Airport	Launceston, Tasmania, Australia	UTC+10:00	Oct-Apr
LSU	WBGU	Long Sukang Airport	Long Sukang, Sarawak, Malaysia	UTC+08:00	
LSV	KLSV	Nellis Air Force Base	Las Vegas, Nevada, United States	UTC−08:00	Mar-Nov
LSW	WITM	Malikus Saleh Airport	Lhokseumawe, Indonesia	UTC+07:00	
LSX	WITL	Lhok Sukon Airport	Lhoksukon, Indonesia	UTC+07:00	
LSY	YLIS	Lismore Airport	Lismore, New South Wales, Australia	UTC+10:00	Oct-Apr
LSZ	LDLO	Lošinj Airport	Lošinj, Croatia	UTC+01:00	Mar-Oct
-LT-
LTA	FATZ	Tzaneen Airport (Letaba Airport)	Tzaneen, South Africa	UTC+02:00	
LTB		Latrobe Airport	Latrobe, Tasmania, Australia	UTC+10:00	Oct-Apr
LTC	FTTH	Laï Airport	Laï, Chad	UTC+01:00	
LTD	HLTD	Ghadames Airport	Ghadames, Libya	UTC+02:00	
LTF		Leitre Airport	Leitre, Papua New Guinea	UTC+10:00	
LTG	VNLT	Langtang Airport	Langtang, Nepal	UTC+05:45	
LTI	ZMAT	Altai Airport	Altai, Mongolia	UTC+08:00	Mar-Sep
LTK	OSLK	Latakia International Airport	Latakia, Syria	UTC+02:00	Mar-Oct
LTL	FOOR	Lastourville Airport	Lastoursville, Gabon	UTC+01:00	
LTM	SYLT	Lethem Airport	Lethem, Guyana	UTC−04:00	
LTN	EGGW	Luton Airport	London, England, United Kingdom	UTC±00:00	Mar-Oct
LTO	MMLT	Loreto International Airport	Loreto, Baja California Sur, Mexico	UTC−07:00	Apr-Oct
LTP	YLHS	Lyndhurst Airport	Lyndhurst, Queensland, Australia	UTC+10:00	
LTQ	LFAT	Le Touquet – Côte d'Opale Airport	Le Touquet-Paris-Plage, Nord-Pas-de-Calais, France	UTC+01:00	Mar-Oct
LTR	EILT	Letterkenny Airfield	Letterkenny, Ireland	UTC±00:00	Mar-Oct
LTS	KLTS	Altus Air Force Base	Altus, Oklahoma, United States	UTC−06:00	Mar-Nov
LTT	LFTZ	La Môle – Saint-Tropez Airport	Saint-Tropez, Provence-Alpes-Côte d'Azur, France	UTC+01:00	Mar-Oct
LTU	VALT	Latur Airport	Latur, Maharashtra, India	UTC+05:30	
LTV	YLOV	Lotus Vale Station Airport	Lotus Vale Station, Queensland, Australia	UTC+10:00	
LTW		St. Mary's County Regional Airport (FAA: 2W6) (Captain Walter Francis Duke Regional Airport)	Leonardtown, Maryland, United States	UTC−05:00	Mar-Nov
LTX	SELT	Cotopaxi International Airport	Latacunga, Ecuador	UTC−05:00	
-LU-
LUA	VNLK	Tenzing-Hillary Airport	Lukla, Nepal	UTC+05:45	
LUB	SYLP	Lumid Pau Airport	Lumid Pau, Guyana	UTC−04:00	
LUC	NFNH	Laucala Airport	Laucala Island, Fiji	UTC+12:00	Nov-Jan
LUD	FYLZ	Lüderitz Airport	Lüderitz, Namibia	UTC+01:00	Sep-Apr
LUE	LZLU	Boľkovce Airport	Lučenec, Slovakia	UTC+01:00	Mar-Oct
LUF	KLUF	Luke Air Force Base	Glendale, Arizona, United States	UTC−07:00	
LUG	LSZA	Lugano Airport	Lugano, Switzerland	UTC+01:00	Mar-Oct
LUH	VILD	Sahnewal Airport (Ludhiana Airport)	Ludhiana, Punjab, India	UTC+05:30	
LUI		La Unión Airport	La Unión, Honduras	UTC−06:00	
LUK	KLUK	Cincinnati Municipal Airport (Lunken Field)	Cincinnati, Ohio, United States	UTC−05:00	Mar-Nov
LUL	KLUL	Hesler-Noble Field	Laurel, Mississippi, United States	UTC−06:00	Mar-Nov
LUM	ZPMS	Dehong Mangshi Airport	Mangshi, Yunnan, China	UTC+08:00	
LUN	FLLS	Kenneth Kaunda International Airport	Lusaka, Zambia	UTC+02:00	
LUO	FNUE	Luena Airport	Luena, Angola	UTC+01:00	
LUP	PHLU	Kalaupapa Airport	Kalaupapa, Hawaii, United States	UTC−10:00	
LUQ	SAOU	Brigadier Mayor César Raúl Ojeda Airport	San Luis, San Luis, Argentina	UTC−03:00	
LUR	PALU	Cape Lisburne LRRS Airport	Cape Lisburne, Alaska, United States	UTC−09:00	Mar-Nov
LUS	FZCE	Lusanga Airport	Lusanga, Democratic Republic of the Congo	UTC+01:00	
LUT	YLRS	New Laura Airport	New Laura, Queensland, Australia	UTC+10:00	
LUU	YLRA	Laura Airport	Laura, Queensland, Australia	UTC+10:00	
LUV	WAPL	Karel Sadsuitubun Airport	Langgur, Indonesia	UTC+09:00	
LUW	WAMW	Syukuran Aminuddin Amir Airport	Luwuk, Indonesia	UTC+08:00	
LUX	ELLX	Luxembourg Findel Airport	Luxembourg, Luxembourg	UTC+01:00	Mar-Oct
LUZ	EPLB	Lublin Airport	Lublin, Poland	UTC+01:00	Mar-Oct
-LV-
LVA	LFOV	Laval Entrammes Airport	Laval, Pays de la Loire, France	UTC+01:00	Mar-Oct
LVB	SSLI	Galpões Airport	Santana do Livramento, Rio Grande do Sul, Brazil	UTC−03:00	
LVD		Lime Village Airport (FAA: 2AK)	Lime Village, Alaska, United States	UTC−09:00	Mar-Nov
LVI	FLLI	Harry Mwanga Nkumbula International Airport	Livingstone, Zambia	UTC+02:00	
LVK	KLVK	Livermore Municipal Airport	Livermore, California, United States	UTC−08:00	Mar-Nov
LVL	KLVL	Lawrenceville/Brunswick Municipal Airport	Lawrenceville, Virginia, United States	UTC−05:00	Mar-Nov
LVM	KLVM	Mission Field	Livingston, Montana, United States	UTC−07:00	Mar-Nov
LVO	YLTN	Laverton Airport	Laverton, Western Australia, Australia	UTC+08:00	
LVP	OIBV	Lavan Airport	Lavan Island, Iran	UTC+03:30	Mar-Sep
LVR	SILC	Bom Futuro Municipal Airport	Lucas do Rio Verde, Mato Grosso, Brazil	UTC−04:00	
LVS	KLVS	Las Vegas Municipal Airport	Las Vegas, New Mexico, United States	UTC−07:00	Mar-Nov
-LW-
LWA		Lebak Airport	Lebak, Philippines	UTC+08:00	
LWB	KLWB	Greenbrier Valley Airport	Lewisburg, West Virginia, United States	UTC−05:00	Mar-Nov
LWC	KLWC	Lawrence Municipal Airport	Lawrence, Kansas, United States	UTC−06:00	Mar-Nov
LWE	WATW	Wonopito Airport	Lewoleba, Indonesia	UTC+08:00	
LWH	YLAH	Lawn Hill Airport	Lawn Hill, Queensland, Australia	UTC+10:00	
LWI		Lowai Airport	Lowai, Papua New Guinea	UTC+10:00	
LWK	EGET	Tingwall Airport (Lerwick/Tingwall Airport)	Lerwick, Scotland, United Kingdom	UTC±00:00	Mar-Oct
LWL	KLWL	Wells Municipal Airport (Harriet Field)	Wells, Nevada, United States	UTC−08:00	Mar-Nov
LWM	KLWM	Lawrence Municipal Airport	Lawrence, Massachusetts, United States	UTC−05:00	Mar-Nov
LWN	UDSG	Shirak Airport	Gyumri, Armenia	UTC+04:00	
LWO	UKLL	Lviv Danylo Halytskyi International Airport	Lviv, Ukraine	UTC+02:00	Mar-Oct
LWR	EHLW	Leeuwarden Air Base	Leeuwarden, Netherlands	UTC+01:00	Mar-Oct
LWS	KLWS	Lewiston–Nez Perce County Airport	Lewiston, Idaho, United States	UTC−08:00	Mar-Nov
LWT	KLWT	Lewistown Municipal Airport	Lewistown, Montana, United States	UTC−07:00	Mar-Nov
LWV	KLWV	Lawrenceville–Vincennes International Airport	Lawrenceville, Illinois, United States	UTC−06:00	Mar-Nov
LWY	WBGW	Lawas Airport	Lawas, Sarawak, Malaysia	UTC+08:00	
-LX-
LXA	ZULS	Lhasa Gonggar Airport	Lhasa, Tibet, China	UTC+06:00	
LXG	VLLN	Louang Namtha Airport	Luang Namtha, Laos	UTC+07:00	
LXN	KLXN	Jim Kelly Field	Lexington, Nebraska, United States	UTC−06:00	Mar-Nov
LXR	HELX	Luxor International Airport	Luxor, Egypt	UTC+02:00	
LXS	LGLM	Lemnos International Airport	Lemnos (Limnos), Greece	UTC+02:00	Mar-Oct
LXU	FLLK	Lukulu Airport	Lukulu, Zambia	UTC+02:00	
LXV	KLXV	Lake County Airport	Leadville, Colorado, United States	UTC−07:00	Mar-Nov
-LY-
LYA	ZHLY	Luoyang Beijiao Airport	Luoyang, Henan, China	UTC+08:00	
LYB	MWCL	Edward Bodden Airfield	Little Cayman, British Overseas Territory of Cayman Islands	UTC−05:00	
LYC	ESNL	Lycksele Airport	Lycksele, Sweden	UTC+01:00	Mar-Oct
LYE	EGDL	RAF Lyneham	Lyneham, England, United Kingdom	UTC±00:00	Mar-Oct
LYG	ZSLG	Lianyungang Baitabu Airport	Lianyungang, Jiangsu, China	UTC+08:00	
LYH	KLYH	Lynchburg Regional Airport (Preston Glenn Field)	Lynchburg, Virginia, United States	UTC−05:00	Mar-Nov
LYI	ZSLY	Linyi Qiyang Airport (formerly Linyi Shubuling Airport)	Linyi, Shandong, China	UTC+08:00	
LYK		Lunyuk Airport	Lunyuk, Indonesia	UTC+08:00	
LYN	LFLY	Lyon–Bron Airport	Lyon, Rhône-Alpes, France	UTC+01:00	Mar-Oct
LYO	KLYO	Lyons–Rice County Municipal Airport	Lyons, Kansas, United States	UTC−06:00	Mar-Nov
LYP	OPFA	Faisalabad International Airport	Faisalabad, Pakistan	UTC+05:00	
LYR	ENSB	Svalbard Airport, Longyear	Longyearbyen, Svalbard, Norway	UTC±00:00	Mar-Oct
LYS	LFLL	Lyon–Saint-Exupéry Airport	Lyon, Rhône-Alpes, France	UTC+01:00	Mar-Oct
LYT		Lady Elliot Island Airport	Lady Elliot Island, Queensland, Australia	UTC+10:00	
LYU	KELO	Ely Municipal Airport (FAA: ELO)	Ely, Minnesota, United States	UTC−06:00	Mar-Nov
LYX	EGMD	Lydd Airport (London Ashford Airport)	Lydd, England, United Kingdom	UTC±00:00	Mar-Oct
-LZ-
LZA	FZUG	Luiza Airport	Luiza, Democratic Republic of the Congo	UTC+02:00	
LZC	MMLC	Lázaro Cárdenas Airport	Lázaro Cárdenas, Michoacán, Mexico	UTC−06:00	Apr-Oct
LZH	ZGZH	Liuzhou Bailian Airport	Liuzhou, Guangxi, China	UTC+08:00	
LZI	FZAL	Luozi Airport	Luozi, Democratic Republic of the Congo	UTC+01:00	
LZM	FNLZ	Cuango-Luzamba Airport	Cuango (Luzamba), Angola	UTC+01:00	
LZN	RCFG	Matsu Nangan Airport	Nangan, Taiwan	UTC+08:00	
LZO	ZULZ	Luzhou Yunlong Airport	Luzhou, Sichuan, China	UTC+08:00	
LZR	YLZI	Lizard Island Airport	Lizard Island, Queensland, Australia	UTC+10:00	
LZU	KLZU	Gwinnett County Airport (Briscoe Field)	LaGrange, Georgia, United States	UTC−05:00	Mar-Nov
LZY	ZUNZ	Nyingchi Mainling Airport	Nyingchi (Linzhi), Tibet, China	UTC+06:00	

== Notes ==
- ^1 Clocks on Lord Howe Island are advanced only 30 minutes for Daylight Saving Time.
- ^2 Airport is located in Saxony.
- ^3 LON is common IATA code for Heathrow Airport (IATA: LHR), Gatwick Airport (IATA: LGW), Luton Airport (IATA: LTN), London Stansted Airport (IATA: STN), London City Airport (IATA: LCY), London Southend Airport (IATA: SEN) and London Biggin Hill Airport (IATA: BQH).
