= Alonte (disambiguation) =

Alonte is a town in Veneto, Italy.

It may also refer to:

- Gel Alonte (born 1976), Filipino politician
- Marlyn Alonte (born 1974), Filipino politician
- Ronnie Alonte (born 1996), Filipino actor, model, singer and dancer
- Alonte Sports Arena, an indoor arena in Biñan, the Philippines
- San Biagio, Alonte, a Roman Catholic church in Veneto, Italy
