= LGO =

LGO may refer to:

== Places ==
- Llangynllo railway station (train station code LGO), Powys, Wales, UK
- Lalgopalganj (train station code LGO), India; see List of railway stations in India
- Langeoog Airport (IATA airport code LGO); see List of airports by IATA airport code: L
- Lingao County (region code LGO), Hainan, China; see List of administrative divisions of Hainan

== People ==
- Local Government Ombudsman (LGO), now the Local Government and Social Care Ombudsman
- L. G. O. Woodhouse (20th century), Surveyor-General of Ceylon

== Other uses ==
- Leaders for Global Operations (LGO), a degree program at MIT
- local government ordinance (LGO)
- learning goal orientation (LGO)
- Largo Resources Ltd. (stock ticker LGO), see Companies listed on the Toronto Stock Exchange (L)
- The "LG-0" series of Gibson L Series acoustic guitar introduced in 1958, pronounced as "el gee oh"

== See also ==
- Oldsmobile LG0, a Quad 4 engine
