= Athena S.p.A. =

Manufacturing & Distribution Company in Italy

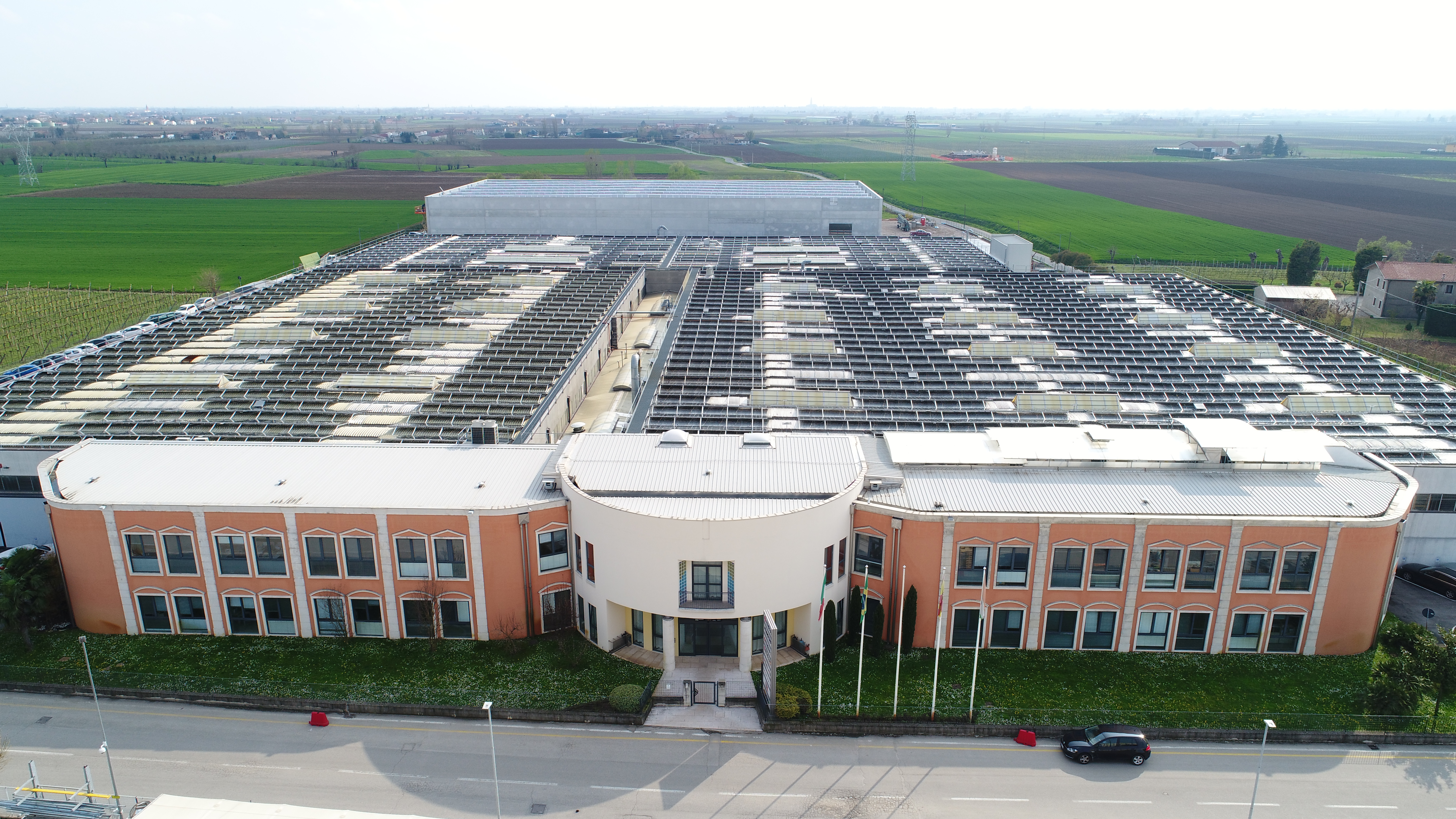
- Athena's headquarters in Alonte, Italy.
- Founded: 1973 in Lonigo
- Founder: Giovanni Mancassola
- Headquarters: Alonte, Italy
- Services: Design and manufacture of gaskets, cylinders, pistons, mechanical and electronic OEM technical items, and spare parts for motorcycles, cars, and industrial applications; distribution of proprietary and third-party brands
- Website: athena.eu athena.industries

Athena S.p.A. is an Italian manufacturing and distribution company headquartered in Alonte, Italy. Established in 1973 in Lonigo, the company operates in three main business areas: the design and manufacture of technical items such as gaskets, cylinders, and pistons for industrial applications, the mechanical and electronic spare parts production for motorcycles and cars, and the distribution of proprietary brands and third-party brands (such as Leatt, Troy Lee Designs, Ogio, Technomousse and Shokz) in Southern Europe.

== History ==
Athena was founded in 1973 when the founder and current president, Giovanni Mancassola, began manufacturing gaskets for motors and established his business in Bagnolo (a village in Lonigo). Athena has then expanded its offer by including technical items in metal, rubber and technopolymers, thermal and acoustic insulators, breather valves and caps, and glass-to-metal plates and connectors.

At the end of the 1980s, the company decided to expand its business by acquiring IGEA, an Italian motorcycle spare parts company. Athena entered the aftermarket industry for motorcycles focusing on gasket kits, cylinder kits, pistons, and other technical spare parts for restoring engines and improving their performance.

The first foreign company to join the Athena group was Vedamotors in Brazil (in 1998), followed by other group companies in the US, Spain, India, and China.

== Operations ==
Athena is an international group with about 1,000 employees and €160 million in revenue (2022 data).

Athena creates components for engines, primarily for motorbikes and cars, for heating and cooling (HVAC), hydraulics, agricultural machinery, household appliances, and new developments for railways and renewable energy.

The company is divided into four divisions:

- Industries Division: design and manufacture of technical items for the main industrial sectors, including automotive and heating/refrigeration.
- Parts Division: manufacture of engine and frame spare parts for motorcycles, cars, and other industrial vehicles
- Electronics Division: engineering and production of engine control units and data acquisition systems for 2, 3 and 4 wheel vehicles.
- Sportech Division: distribution of brands in the two-wheeler, Tech and Free Time industries. This division was launched in 2009 with the distribution of GoPro action cameras in the Italian market. In 2019, Athena was named Best GoPro distributor of the year.

The companies in the group are:

- Vedamotors – Lontras (SC) – Brazil
- Athena USA. Inc – Bradenton (FL) – USA
- Athena-Sce. Inc – Mount Pleasant (TN) – USA
- Athena Motor Iberica – Barcelona – Spain
- Athena Hitech Components Pvt. Ltd – Bangalore – India
- Athena Automotive And Industrial Parts Co. Ltd – Hangzhou – People's Republic Of China

Athena is the official supplier of brands in the motorcycle industry, such as Ducati, Fantic, KTM, Piaggio, and Triumph. The company has developed electronic control units, gaskets, and cylinders for these motorcycle manufacturers. Athena also partners with the Stellantis group and BMW in the automotive industry.

In the heating industry, Athena works with companies such as Immergas, Ariston, Condevo, Polidoro, Riello, and Alfa Laval, providing high-temperature resistant components. The company works in the field of renewable energy through its partnerships with academic institutions such as UniMore and research organizations such as INSTM.

== Sponsorships ==
Athena has sponsored the Motocross World Championship (MXGP) for several years, partnering with Infront and supporting various teams in the international off-road circuit.

Some of the most important partnerships since its founding are the collaborations with the eight-time world champion Antonio Cairoli and Claudio De Carli's team, as well as the partnership with the Honda HRC Team and the Yamaha Factory Racing Team.
