= LGX =

LGX may refer to:

- Yggdrasil Linux/GNU/X (LGX), a 1990s computer operating system distro
- GM LGX, a GM High Feature engine
- Luxembourg Green Exchange (LGX), on the Luxembourg Stock Exchange
- Lugh Ganane Airport (IATA code LGX), Somalia
- Langxi County (region code LGX), Anhui, China; see List of administrative divisions of Anhui
