= Clémentine Shakembo Kamanga =

Congolese diplomat and writer

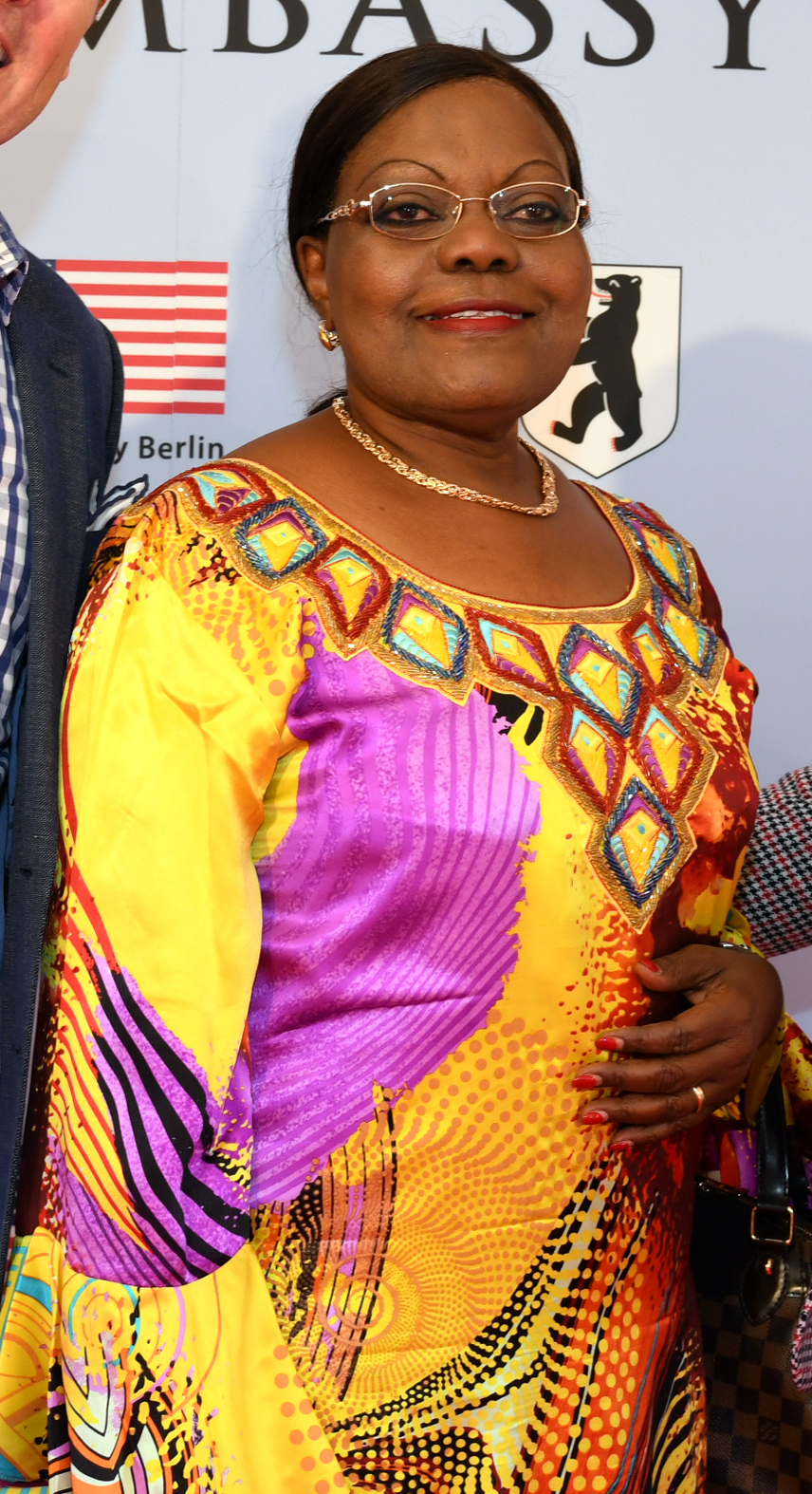

Ambassador of the Democratic Republic of Congo to the Republic of Poland and Hungary
- Incumbent
- Assumed office 10 October 2022
- President: Félix Tshisekedi
- Prime Minister: Sama Lukonde; Judith Suminwa

Personal details
- Born: 25 January 1950 (age 76) Lusambo, Democratic Republic of the Congo
- Education: Paris 8 University Vincennes-Saint-Denis; European Institute of Public Administration

Clémentine Shakembo Kamanga (born 25 January 1950) is a Congolese diplomat and writer. She has served as Ambassador of the Democratic Republic of Congo (DR Congo) to countries including Germany, Hungary and Poland.

== Biography ==
Kamanga was born on 25 January 1950 in Lusambo. She speaks English, French and Portuguese.

Kamanga holds Bachelors and Masters degrees in Psychology from the Paris 8 University Vincennes-Saint-Denis. In 1976, she joined the Ministry of Foreign Affairs, where she worked in the Department of Multilateral Relations and then in the Department of International Organizations.

In 1979, Kamanga completed a traineeship in International Relations with the United Nations in Moscow, Russia. In 1984, she completed a course in International Relations at the European Institute of Public Administration in Paris.

In 2001, Kamanga cofounded the "Multidisciplinary Group of Congolese Women." She is also an honorary member of the environmental protection Non-governmental organization (NGO) "Propre."

In 2009, Kamanga was honoured at the Democratic Republic of Congo’s Séminaire Politico-Stratégique. Kamanga served as Ambassador of the Democratic Republic of Congo to Germany. She encouraged German eco-tourism to the Democratic Republic of Congo.

Since 10 October 2022, Kamanga has served as Ambassador of the Democratic Republic of Congo to the Republic of Poland and Hungary, presenting her credentials to the President of Poland, Andrzej Duda. As Ambassador, she has promoted investment opportunities in Congo with the Polish Chamber of Commerce (KiG) and has attended meetings with the Polish Ministry of Agriculture and Rural Development regarding potential partnership opportunities for agricultural development between the nations.

Kamanga has self-published an autobiography about her life as a diplomat, released in 2021.
