= Félicienne Lusamba Villoz-Muamba =

Congolese-Swiss politician and human rights activist

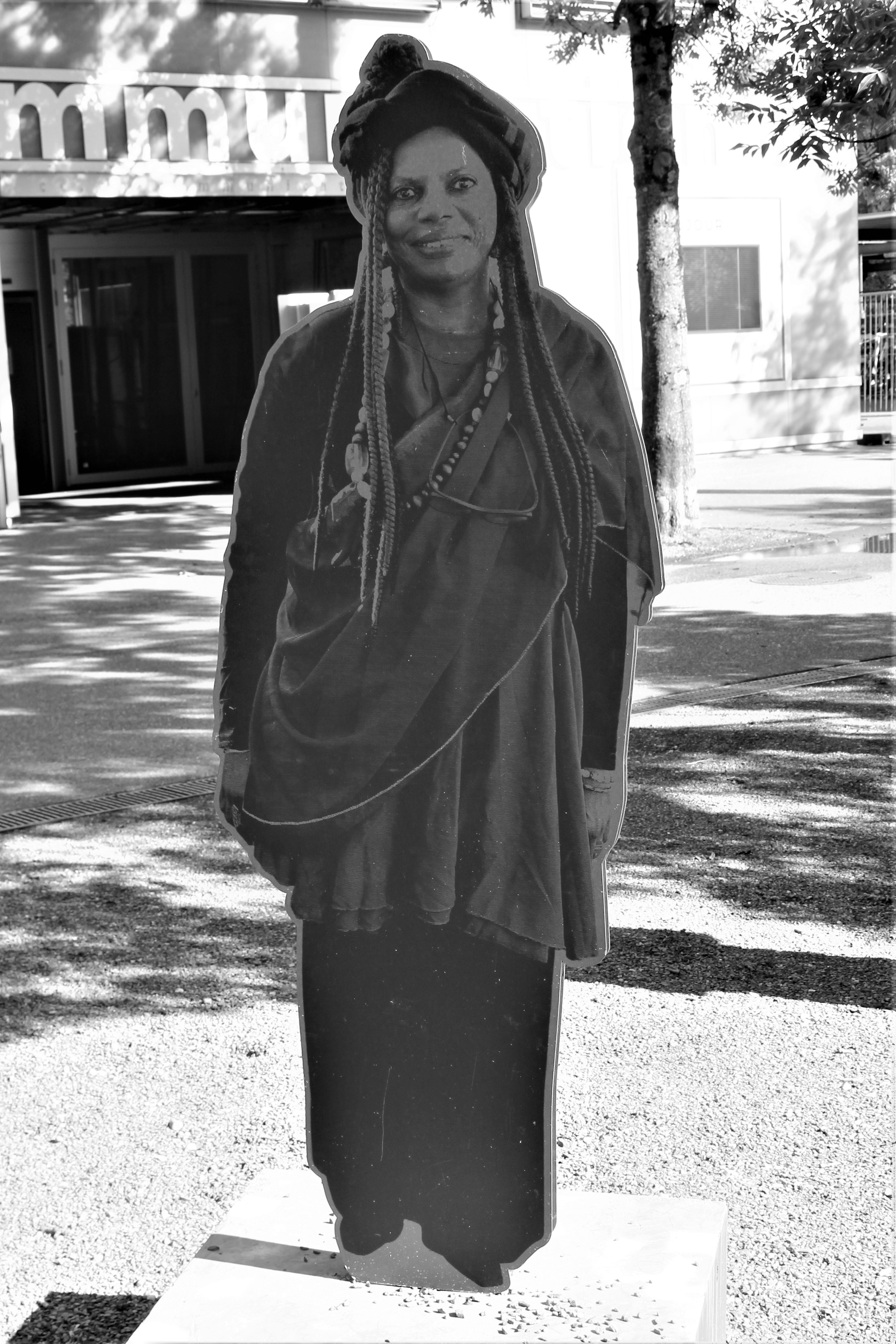
- A cut-out photograph of Villoz-Muamba displayed in Bienne (2022)

Councillor for the City of Bern
- In office 2000–2008

Member of the Grand Council of Bern
- In office 2008–2010

Personal details
- Born: 1956
- Died: 2 December 2019 (aged 62–63)
- Party: Green Party of Switzerland
- Occupation: Politician, counsellor, anti-racism and women's rights activist

Félicienne Lusamba Villoz-Muamba (13 May 1956 – 2 December 2019) was a Congolese-Swiss politician and human rights activist.

== Early life ==
Villoz-Muamba was born Félicienne Lusamba Muamba in 1956 in Lusambo, then part of the Belgian Congo. She was the eldest of eighteen children born to her parents, who were schoolteachers and followers of Catholicism.

In 1962, at the age of six, Villoz-Muamba moved to Brussels to receive a primary education and live with her aunt. She completed her secondary education in the Congo, then returned to Belgium to study law in Brussels and Paris.

== Career ==
Villoz-Muamba moved to Switzerland in 1984, after she was hired by the Embassy of the Democratic Republic of the Congo (then Zaire) in Bern. She relocated with six of her siblings, who at that time were under her guardianship.

Her work in the embassy's visa department exposed Villoz-Muamba to the experiences of refugees, and their difficulties in being believed or overcoming discrimination. These interactions prompted Villoz-Muamba to leave her post at the embassy in the mid-1990s to work within volunteer networks that supported immigrant integration. She worked with teachers at local educational institutions to help them support students from different cultural backgrounds.

After marrying Jacques Villoz, a Swiss citizen, she relocated to Bienne, where the couple had two children together.

== Political and nonprofit work ==
=== Municipal ===
In 2000, Villoz-Muamba became the first black woman to be elected to Bienne City Council, having campaigned as a member of the Green Party. Outside of her work in municipal government, she co-founded Carrefour de Réflexion et d'Action contre le Racisme Anti-Noir (CRAN; "Crossroads for Reflection and Action against anti-Black racism") in 2002, based in Geneva. By the time of Villoz-Muamba's death, CRAN was the largest anti-Black racism association in Switzerland. Between 2006 and 2008, she also undertook continuing education in the topics of adult education, intercultural mediation, and sexual and reproductive health.

=== Cantonal ===
Villoz-Muamba held her municipal position until 2008, when she instead ran for a mid-cycle seat on the Grand Council of Bern. She was successful, becoming not only the first black woman to reach the office, but the first woman of African origin to serve on a cantonal legislature in Swiss history. During her term, she co-authored a review of the progression of pay for teachers in Bern.

While serving in the legislature, she continued to run integration workshops at a local adult education and vocational training institute. She also worked with the Swiss Network Against Excision to raise awareness of, and combat, female genital mutilation among immigrant communities. In 2009, she contributed to the founding of l’Université Populaire Africaine (UPAF; "the Popular African University"), an anti-racism and cultural exchange organisation.

Although Villoz-Muamba won re-election in 2010, she was ultimately forced to decline the seat on health grounds.

=== Other work ===
Around the time of her resignation from politics, Villoz-Muamba became involved with Caritas Internationalis. She primarily provided counselling and social integration assistance to immigrants, though she also provided support to elderly people experiencing loneliness. She described her professional motivation as a desire to "motivate people to go out, exchange ideas and engage in new encounters."

Though her campaigns for racial equality occasionally attracted threats, Villoz-Muamba served as CRAN's president until 2019. In June that year, she and CRAN released a statement criticising instances of police brutality against black men in Basel. Between 2013 and 2019, she also worked as a sexual health counsellor at a family planning centre in Delémont.

== Death ==
Villoz-Muamba died on 2 December 2019 after a long illness.

== Legacy ==
- Villoz-Muamba's story features in a 2020 biographical anthology of notable Black Swiss women, I Will Be Different Every Time.
- A statue memorialising Villoz-Muamba was erected in Bienne's Robert Walser Square in 2021, as part of Switzerland celebrating the 50th anniversary of women's suffrage in the country.
- In 2024, Bienne's council named a street in the city after Villoz-Muamba.
