= Alférez Armando Rodríguez Airport =

Alférez Armando Rodríguez Airport Aeropuerto Alférez Armando Rodríguez
- IATA: LLS; ICAO: SATK

Summary
- Airport type: Public
- Serves: Las Lomitas, Argentina
- Elevation AMSL: 427 ft / 130 m
- Coordinates: 24°43′15″S 60°32′56″W

Map
- Location of airport in Argentina

Runways
Direction	Length		Surface
Direction	m	ft	Surface
18/36	1,800	5,906	Asphalt
- Source: Landings.com Google Maps GCM

Alférez Armando Rodríguez Airport (Spanish: Aeropuerto Alférez Armando Rodríguez, IATA: LLS, ICAO: SATK) is a public use airport serving Las Lomitas, a town in the Formosa Province of Argentina. The airport is 3 kilometres (2 mi) east of the town.

In 2012, the Argentine Air Force installed a long range primary air surveillance radar (es) at the airport.

== See also ==
- Transport in Argentina
- List of airports in Argentina
