= Mason County Airport (Michigan) =

Coordinates: 43°57′45″N 086°24′28″W

- IATA: LDM; ICAO: KLDM; FAA LID: LDM

Summary
- Airport type: Public
- Owner: Mason County
- Serves: Ludington
- Location: Ludington, Michigan
- Elevation AMSL: 647 ft / 197 m

Map
- Location of airport in Michigan LDM (the United States)

Runways
Direction	Length		Surface
Direction	ft	m	Surface
8/26	5,003	1,525	Asphalt
1/19	3,503	1,068	Asphalt

Statistics (2021)
- Aircraft operations: 9,182
- Source: Federal Aviation Administration

Mason County Airport (IATA: LDM, ICAO: KLDM, FAA LID: LDM) is a county-owned public-use airport located two miles (3 km) northeast of the central business district of Ludington, a city in Mason County, Michigan, United States.

== History ==
The airport sits on the land of former lawyer Charles Wing, who published the local newsletter and ran businesses in the area. The land was sold to Mason County in 1920 for use as an airport.

The county airport was officially established in 1927 with a single grass runway, and the First Michigan Air Tour was held at the airport in 1928.

Development at the airport was stopped during the Great Depression, but a major overhaul was planned in 1939 with funds split between the county and the state. A new runway was built, and the existing runway was extended. A third runway was built in 1949, and the United States federal government provided portable lighting for the airport.

Northern Air Service was the first company to provide regular commercial air service to the airport. It supported a Dow Magnesium defense plant nearby.

The airport saw its biggest growth to date after World War II as more families bought airplanes and new hangars were built.

The airport's first concrete runway was built in the early 1960s, and a second was built in 1966. That second runway was extended twice until it was just over 5,000 feet long.

The airport got its second commercial service in 1969 when Miller Airline flew twice daily to Lansing and Grand Rapids. That service lasted until the airline folded months later.

The airport hosts a number of events in the modern day, including an aviation summer camp for youth in the area.

== Facilities and aircraft ==
Mason County Airport covers an area of 238 acres (96 ha) which contains two asphalt paved runways: 8/26 measuring 5,003 x 75 ft (1,525 x 23 m) and 1/19 measuring 3,503 x 75 ft (1,068 x 23 m).

For the 12-month period ending December 31, 2021, the airport had 9,182 aircraft operations, an average of 25 per day: 83% general aviation and 16% air taxi. For the same time period, there were 19 aircraft based on the field, all airplanes: 18 single-engine and 1 multi-engine. It is included in the Federal Aviation Administration (FAA) National Plan of Integrated Airport Systems for 2017–2021, in which it is categorized as a local general aviation facility.

The aircraft has a fixed-base operator that offers services such as fuel, conference rooms, a crew lounge, snooze rooms, showers, and a courtesy car.

== Accidents and incidents ==
- On March 26, 1993, a Cessna 182 Skylane was destroyed during an NDB approach into Mason County Airport. A witness reported the aircraft sounded normal for the approach phase of a flight, though the pilot was unable to successfully land the plane after two approaches. On the third approach, the plane sounded lower to the ground, and the witness reported suddenly hearing a "hard and fast" throttle input, though the aircraft subsequently impacted trees. The probable cause was found to be the pilot's improper instrument procedures, especially related to weather conditions below instrument approach minimums.
- On July 2, 2003, a Cessna 140 sustained substantial damage when the left main landing gear axle separated from the landing gear during landing on runway 18 at Mason County Airport. The pilot reported a "strange wobble" on the landing rollout, and the left main gear axle then separated from the landing gear strut. Though the pilot was able to maintain directional control using the rudder, the main gear leg dropped into hole in the pavement, which resulted in the airplane nosing down causing a prop strike. The pilot reported the airplane slid to a stop and rested on the propeller and cowling in a tail up position. The probable cause was found to be the maintenance personnel's improper installation of the landing gear axle, which resulted in the separation of the axle from the landing gear.

== See also ==
- List of airports in Michigan
