= San Biagio, Alonte =

Roman Catholic church in Vicenza province, Italy

Coordinates: 45°21′54.3″N 11°25′37.7″E

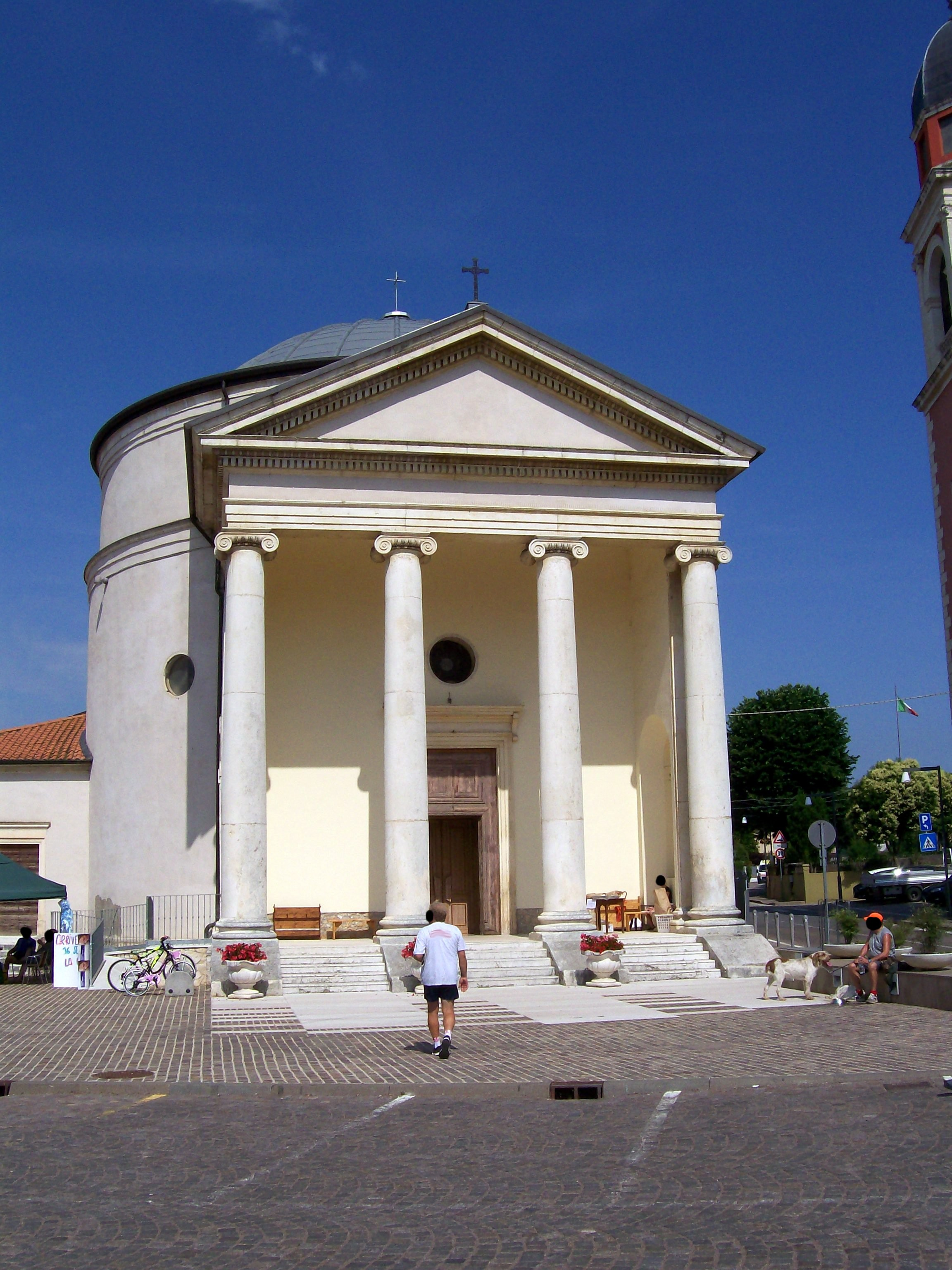
Facade of the parish church of Alonte.

San Biagio is a circular Baroque style, Roman Catholic church located outside of the town of Alonte, Province of Vicenza, Veneto, Italy.

== History ==
Documents from 1297 to 1303, note a church at this site, outside the town. In 1631, the church was reconstructed and dedicated to a St Blaise. It remained a parish church till the mid-1800s, when it was abandoned in disrepair. But soon, need for a new parish church led to reconstruction by the engineer Antonion Trevisan in 1868, and further work in 1935.

The circular nave has a well lit, large cupola. The interior has two side altars, one depicting St Blaise, the other the Madonna and Child (1892).
