= Lague =

Lague is both a given name and a surname. Notable people with the name include:

- Lague Byiringiro (born 2000), Rwandan footballer
- André Sainte-Laguë (1882–1950), French mathematician
- Jacinthe Laguë, Canadian actress
- Maggie LaGue, American ice hockey player
- Mario Laguë (1958–2010), Canadian diplomat
