= Lusambo =

Lusambo Mji wa Lusambo
- Provincial capital and city
- Ville de Lusambo
- Location within Democratic Republic of the Congo
- Coordinates: 4.972912°S 23.436756°E
- Country: DR Congo
- Province: Sankuru
- Communes: Kabondo, Lupembe, Lusambo, Tusuanganyi

Government
  - Mayor: Louis Manga
- Time zone: UTC+2 (Central Africa Time)
- Climate: Aw

Lusambo (Swahili: Mji wa Lusambo) is the capital city of Sankuru province, Democratic Republic of the Congo. The town lies north of the confluence of the Sankuru River and the Lubi River. Lusambo is served by Lusambo Airport.

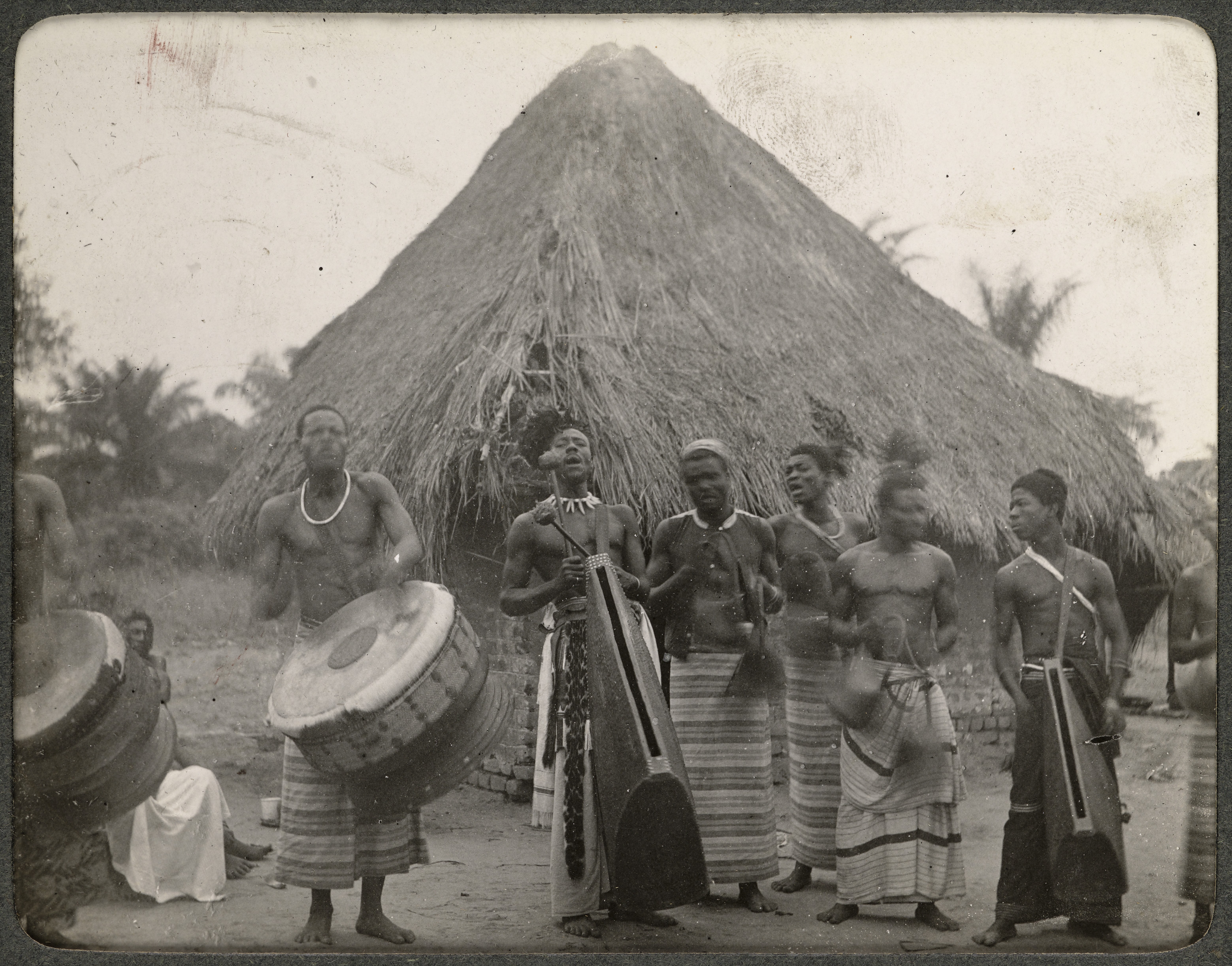
A native band in 1903

In 1890 Lusambo was chosen by Paul Le Marinel as the main Belgian base in the Kasai region to defend against the Arab or Swahili traders in slaves and ivory who came from the east. The station would soon become one of the most important military posts of the Congo Free State with a permanent staff of seventeen whites, six hundred native soldiers and four artillery pieces.

In 1999 the new Kabila government and its ally, the Zimbabwean government of Robert Mugabe, claimed that U.S. mercenaries were helping Ugandan and Rwandan-backed rebel forces who had surrounded 700 Zimbabwean troops near Lusambo during the Second Congo War.

== Notable people ==
- Clémentine Shakembo Kamanga
- Félicienne Lusamba Villoz-Muamba
