= Lucca-Tassignano Airport =

Lucca-Tassignano Airport Aeroporto di Lucca-Tassignano
- IATA: LCV; ICAO: LIQL

Summary
- Airport type: Public
- Operator: Società Aeroporto di Capannori S.p.A.
- Serves: Lucca, Italy
- Location: Capannori
- Elevation AMSL: 39 ft (12 m)
- Coordinates: 43°49′33″N 10°34′41″E
- Website: www.aeroportocapannori.it

Map
- Location of airport in Italy

Runways
Direction	Length		Surface
Direction	m	ft	Surface
10/28	910	2,986	Asphalt

Lucca-Tassignano Airport is a public airport located in Tassignano, (Capannori), 5 kilometres (3.1 mi) from the center of the city of Lucca. The airport is open all days from 9:00 to 19:00, except on Tuesdays. Currently, the airport is a base for various helicopter enabled shutdown forest fires (including an Erickson Air-Crane S-64 and a Eurocopter AS350) and for a flying school of the local aeroclub.

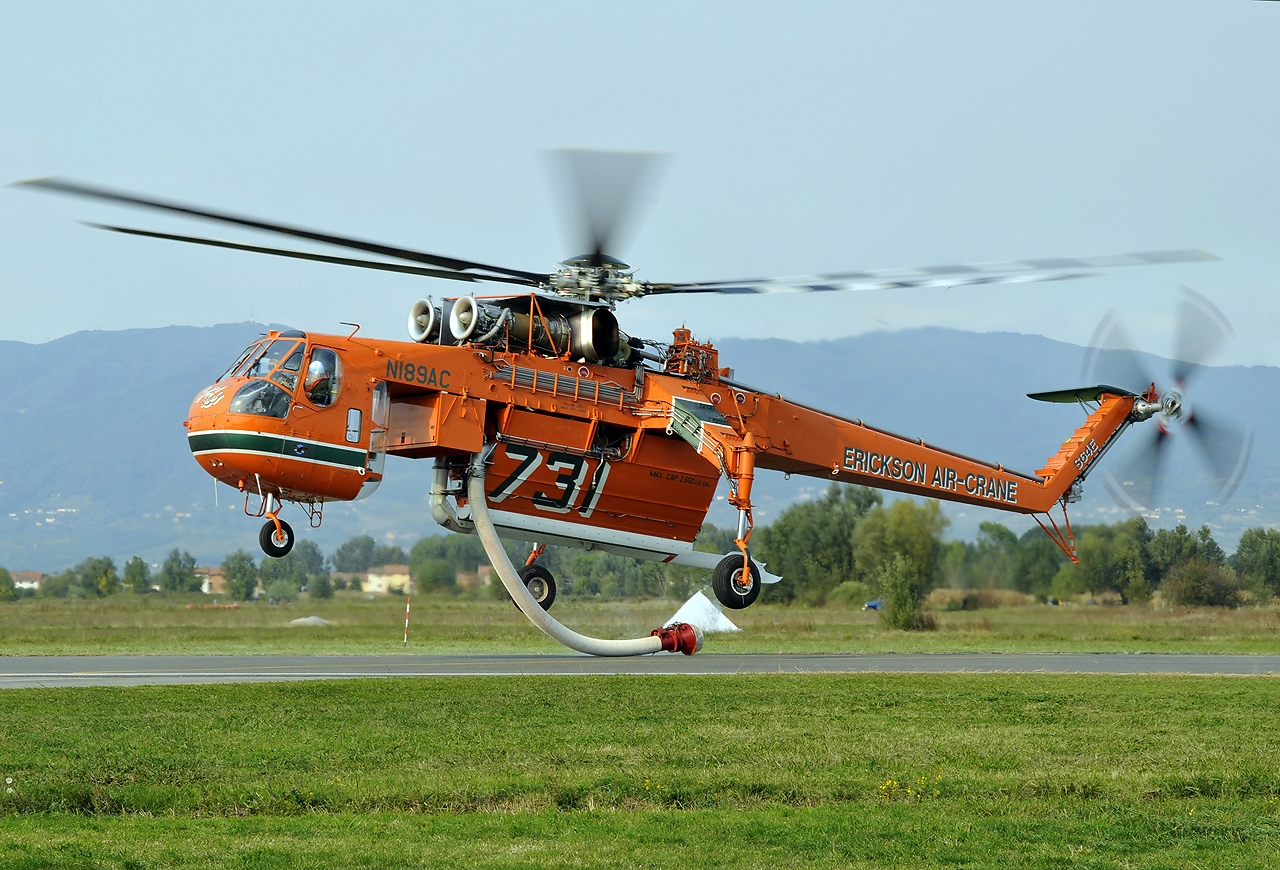
An Erckson Air-Crane S-64 at Tassignano Airport

== History ==
The airport, opened on 29 November 1932 as "airfield", it was made with the assistance of the Provincial Administration of Lucca.

In 1935 the airport passed under the control of the Royal Air Force who founded a military flight school.

During the war the airport was home to several departments and also to the complementary group for aerial observation and the German units operating with Junkers Ju 52. At the time of the abandonment of the Lucca's area, the Germans totaled it, reducing the airport to a field without any structure of aviation.

After the war period, the Ministry of Defense began to use the area for exercises of air drops of parachutists from military units based in Pisa and Livorno, reserving the southern 100 by 1,033 metres (328 ft × 3,389 ft) to airport activity for the local flying clubs and other associations flight.

In 1961, at the initiative of the Aero Club of Lucca and at the request of local authorities, it was re-opened to traffic.

In 1963, in view of the favorable location, the Italian Ministry of Defence declared it open to the national tourist traffic.

In 1982 the airport operator was assigned to the Provincial Consortium Lucca Airport. The remaining area was sold to the Administration of the Italian Army to use it as a launching area.

In 1997, following instructions issued by the Ministry of Transport that it had already taken ownership of the Ministry of Defense, it was named "Lucca-Tassignano Airport Ltd." that, as of 1 January 1999, took over the management of the Consortium and still preserves the modification in "Airport Capannori SpA".

In 2012 the inauguration of the new airport terminal building, redeveloped the former civil defense. In 2013 work began on upgrading Dell'Aerea Airport Land Side (new parking lots and demolition of the old control tower) and installation of the new 15 m (49 ft) control tower.

== Facilities ==
The airport has a 910 m × 18 m (2,986 ft × 59 ft) asphalt runway. The property offers many services, including airport Flight Information Service (AFIS), Handling, Storage and Workshop aircraft. There are also available at the airport a bar, a restaurant, the taxi service, and a car rental.

The nearest big airport is Pisa International Airport approximately 40 km (25 mi) from Lucca-Tassignano Airport.
