= Lençóis Airport =

Coronel Horácio de Mattos Airport Aeroporto Coronel Horácio de Mattos
- IATA: LEC; ICAO: SBLE; LID: BA0006

Summary
- Airport type: Public
- Operator: GRU Airport (2025–present)
- Serves: Lençóis, Chapada Diamantina
- Time zone: BRT (UTC−03:00)
- Elevation AMSL: 506 m (1,660 ft)
- Coordinates: 12°28′56″S 041°16′37″W

Map
- Location in Brazil

Runways
| Direction | Length | | Surface |
| Direction | m | ft | Surface |
|---|---|---|---|
| 14/32 | 2,082 | 6,831 | Asphalt |
- Sources: ANAC, DECEA

Coronel Horácio de Mattos Airport (IATA: LEC, ICAO: SBLE) is the airport serving Lençóis and Chapada Diamantina National Park, Brazil. It is named after Horácio Queiróz de Mattos (1882-1931), a politician who fought against the Prestes Insurrection between 1925 and 1927.

It is managed by GRU Airport.

== History ==
On November 27, 2025 GRU Airport won the concession to operate the airport.

== Airlines and destinations ==
| Airlines | Destinations |
|---|---|
| Azul Brazilian Airlines | Salvador da Bahia |

== Access ==
The airport is located at Chapada Diamantina National Park, 20 km (12 mi) from downtown Lençóis.

== See also ==
- List of airports in Brazil
