= Lusambo Airport =

- IATA: LBO; ICAO: FZVI

Summary
- Serves: Lusambo, Democratic Republic of the Congo
- Elevation AMSL: 1,407 ft / 429 m
- Coordinates: 4°57′42″S 23°22′42″E

Map
- Location of the airport in the Democratic Republic of the Congo

Runways
| Direction | Length | | Surface |
| Direction | m | ft | Surface |
|---|---|---|---|
| 12/30 | 1,230 | 4,035 | Gravel |
- Source: GCM Google Maps

Lusambo Airport (IATA: LBO, ICAO: FZVI) is an airport serving Lusambo, a town and territory in the Sankuru district of the Kasai-Oriental Province, Democratic Republic of the Congo. The runway is 6 kilometres (3.7 mi) west of Lusambo and parallels the Sankuru River.

== See also ==
- Transport in the Democratic Republic of the Congo
- List of airports in the Democratic Republic of the Congo
