= Alonte =

- Comune
- Comune di Alonte
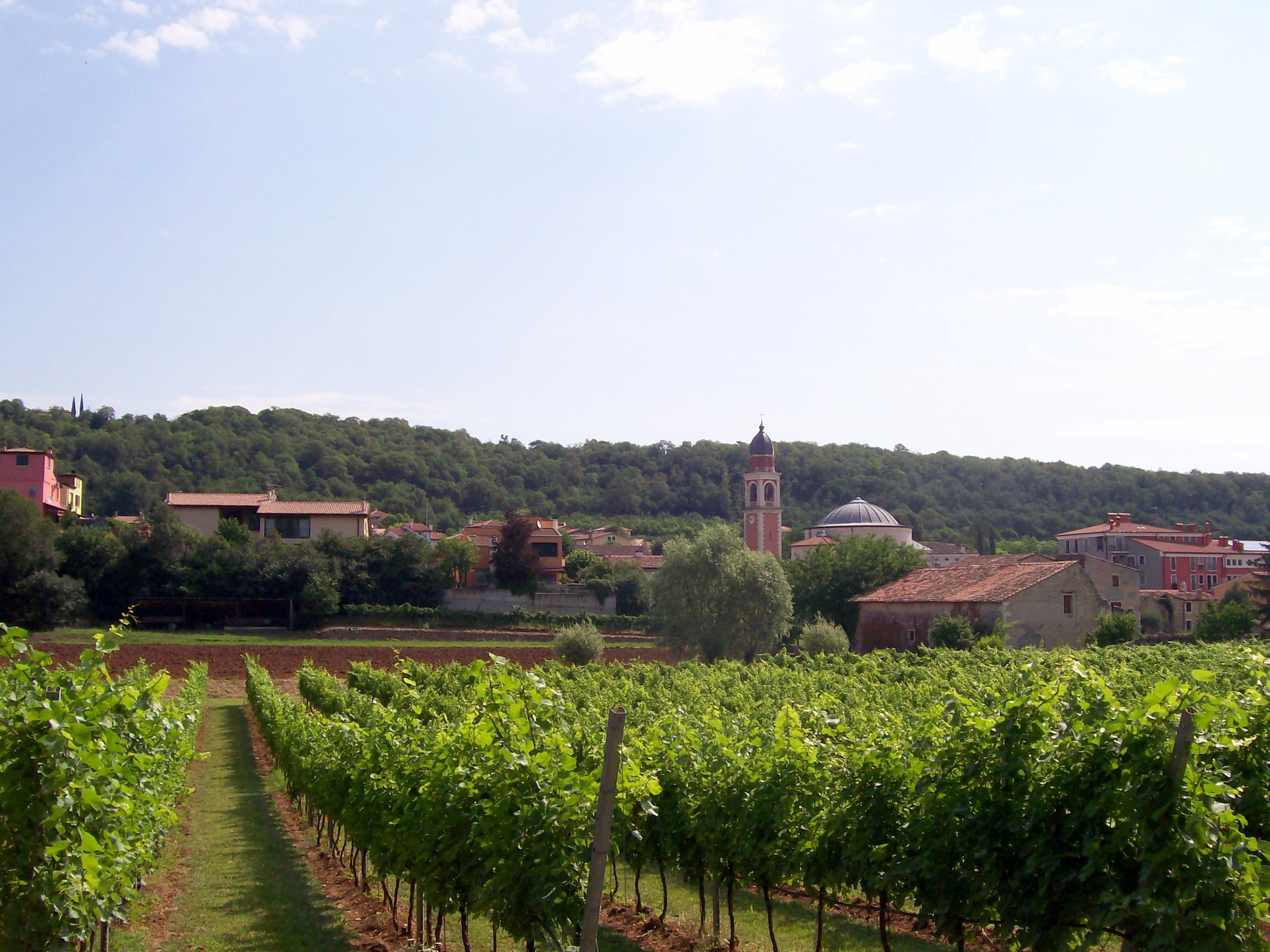
- View of Alonte

- Coat of arms

- Location of Alonte in Italy Alonte (Veneto)
- Coordinates: 45°22′N 11°26′E
- Country: Italy
- Region: Veneto
- Province: Vicenza (VI)
- Frazioni: Corlanzone

Government
  - Mayor: Luigi Tassoni

Area
  - Total: 11.15 km^{2} (4.31 sq mi)
- Elevation: 34 m (112 ft)

Population (30 April 2017)
  - Total: 1,648
  - Density: 147.8/km^{2} (382.8/sq mi)
- Demonym: Alontini
- Time zone: UTC+1 (CET)
  - Summer (DST): UTC+2 (CEST)
- Postal code: 36045
- Dialing code: 0444
- Website: Official website

Alonte is a town in the province of Vicenza, Veneto, Italy. It is located north of Via San Feliciano.

Among the sights in the town is the Baroque church of San Biagio.

== Economy ==
Athena S.p.A., an Italian manufacturing and distribution company is headquartered in Alonte.
