= Lençóis =

Municipality of Bahia, Brazil

- Municipality
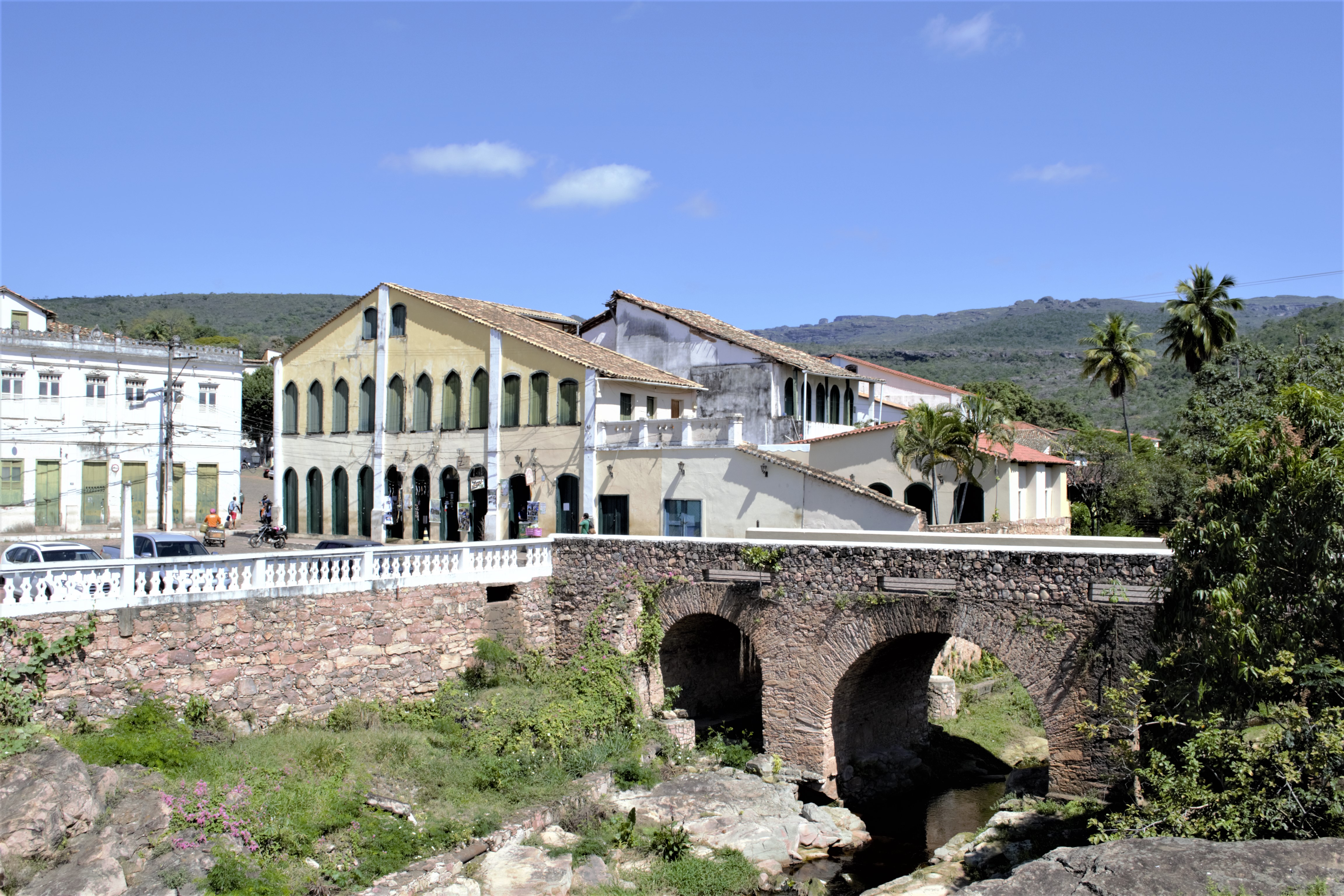
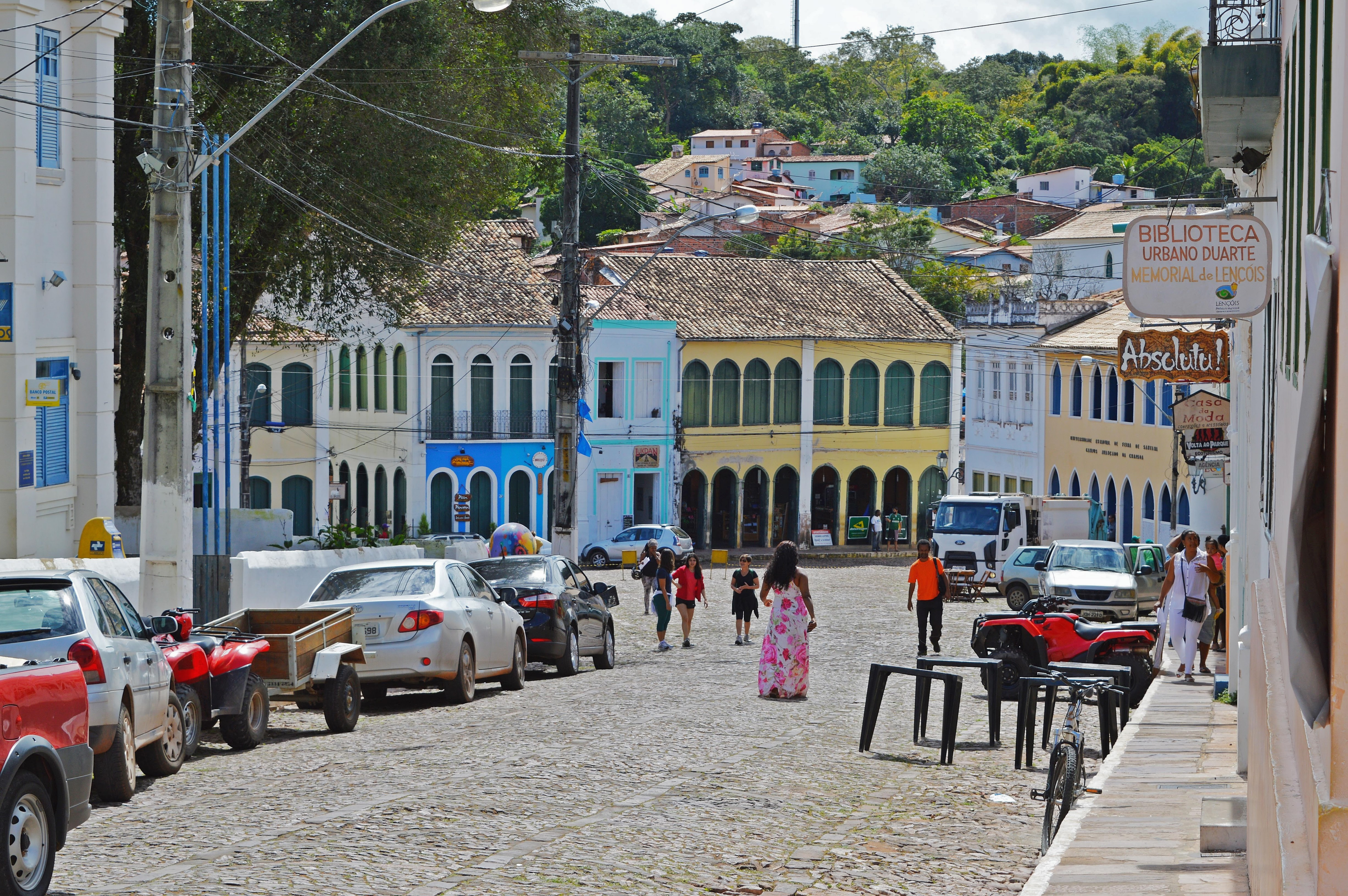
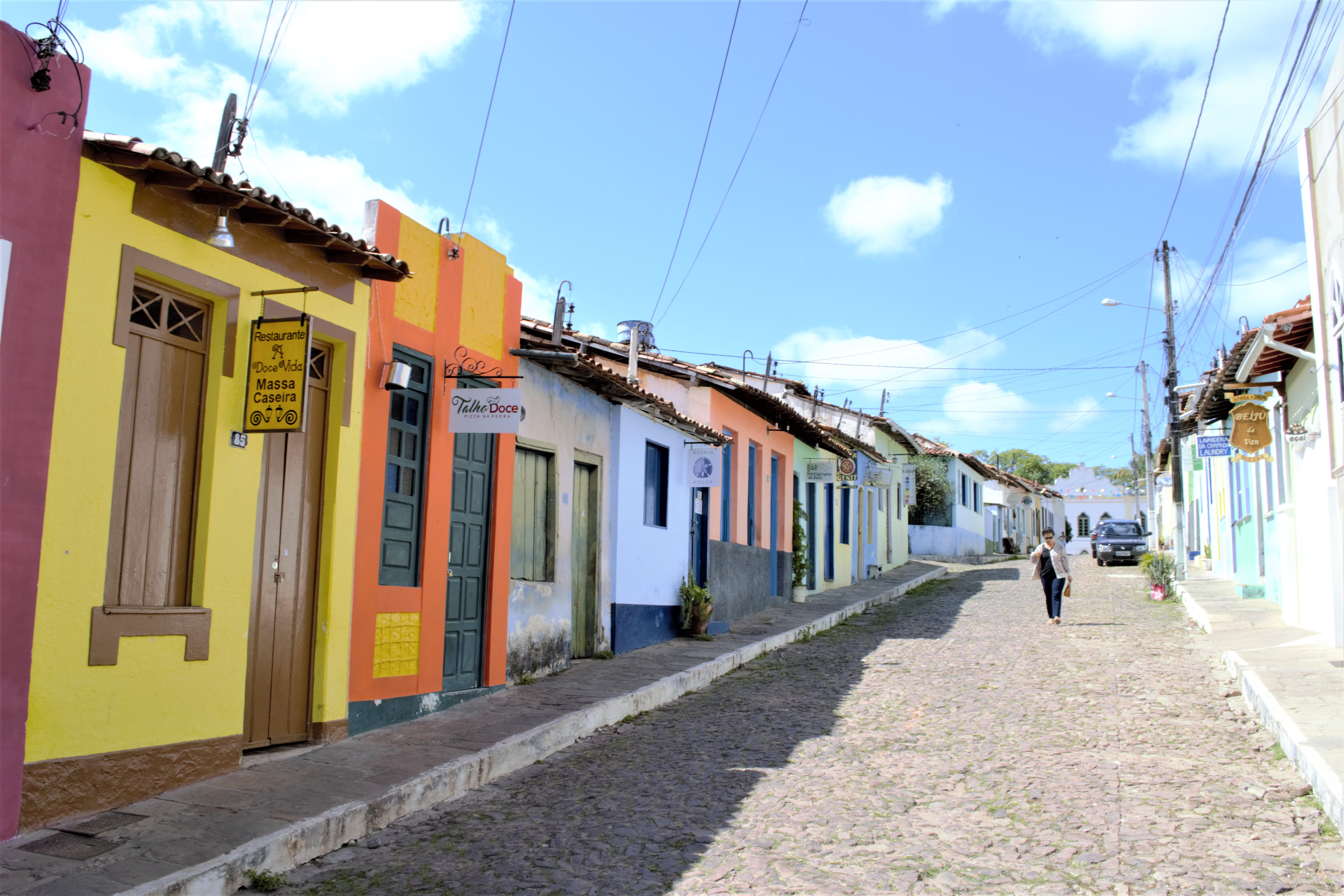
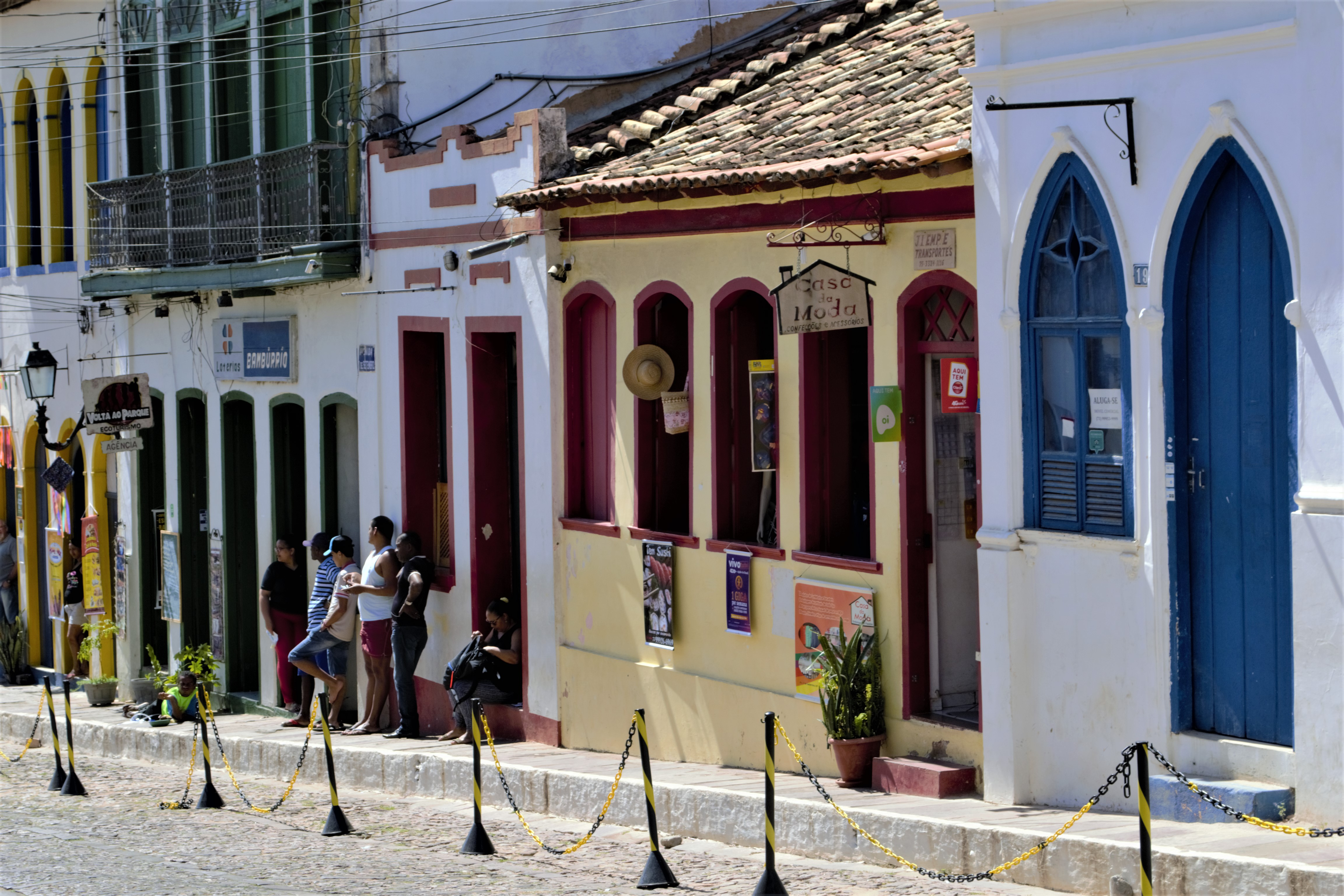
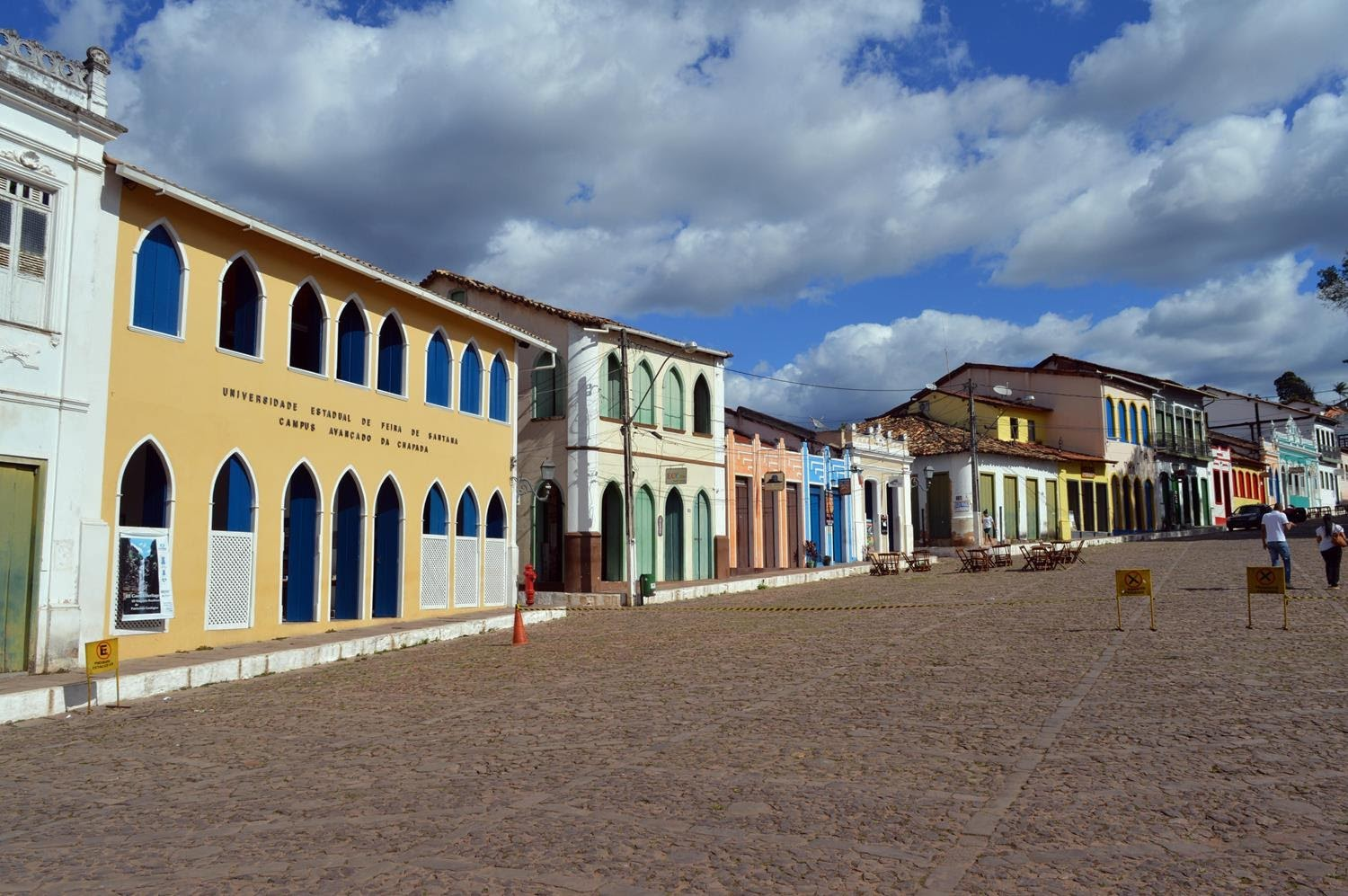
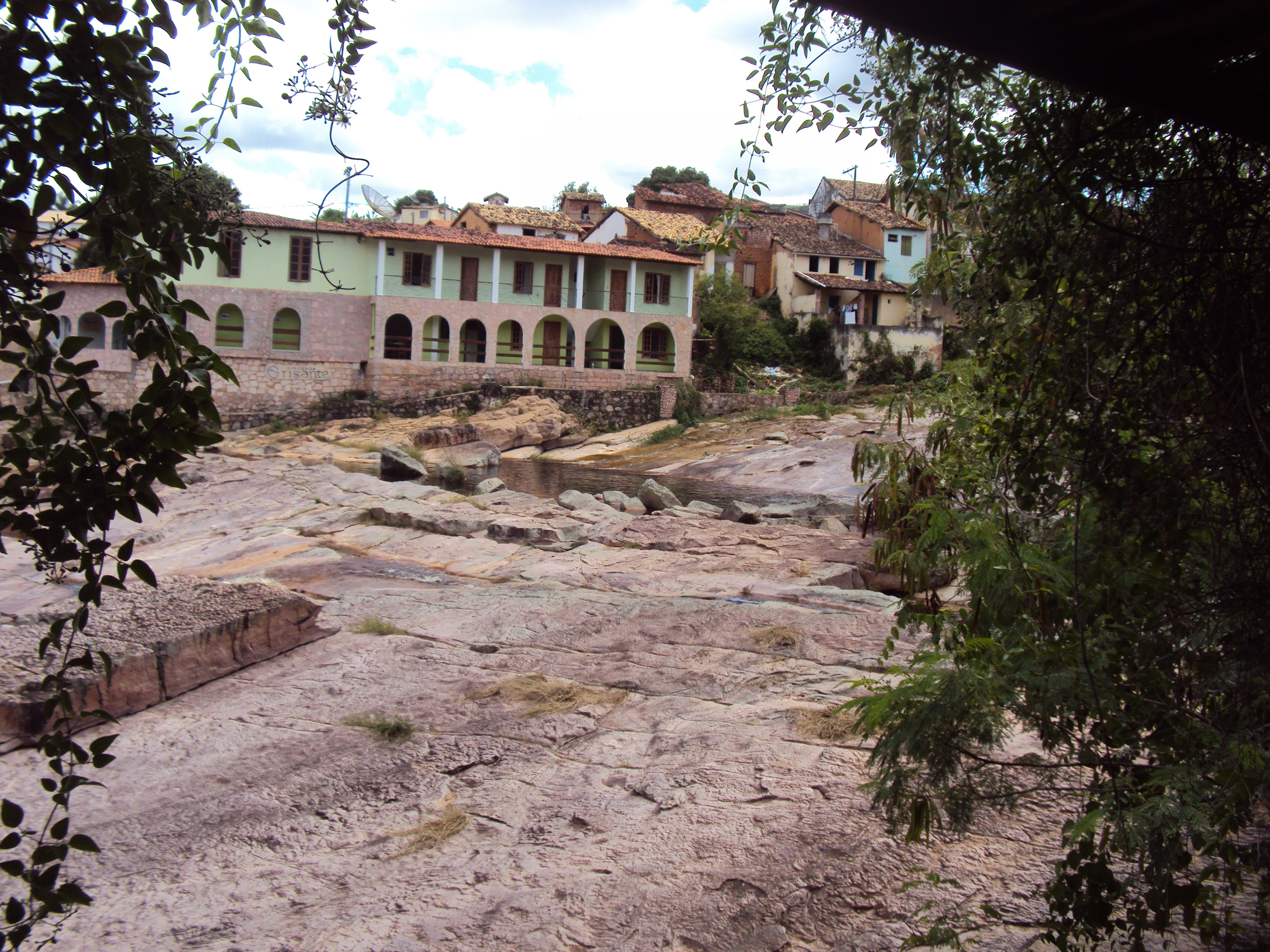
- Historic Center of Lençóis.

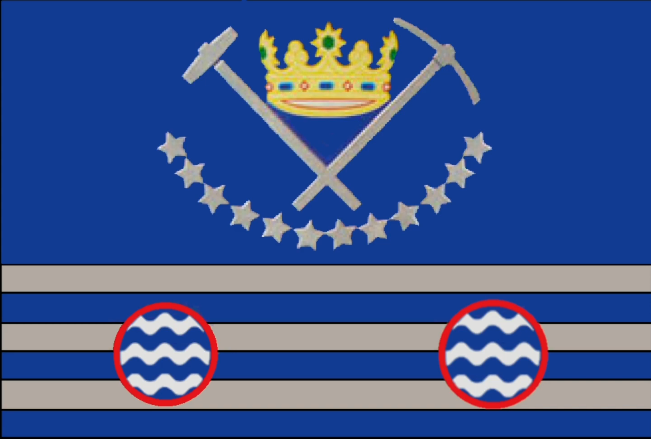
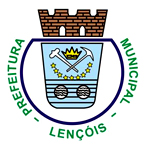
- Flag Coat of arms

- Location in Bahia state

- Location in Brazil
- Coordinates: 12°33′46″S 41°23′24″W
- Country: Brazil
- Region: Northeast
- State: Bahia

Area
  - Total: 1,277 km^{2} (493 sq mi)

Population (2020)
  - Total: 11,499
  - Density: 9.005/km^{2} (23.32/sq mi)
- Time zone: UTC−3 (BRT)

Lençóis is a municipality in the state of Bahia in Brazil. The population is 11,499 (2020 est.) in an area of 1277 km^{2}. The town has a well-preserved colonial atmosphere and is the starting point for treks into Chapada Diamantina.

== Transportation ==
The city is served by Horácio de Mattos Airport.

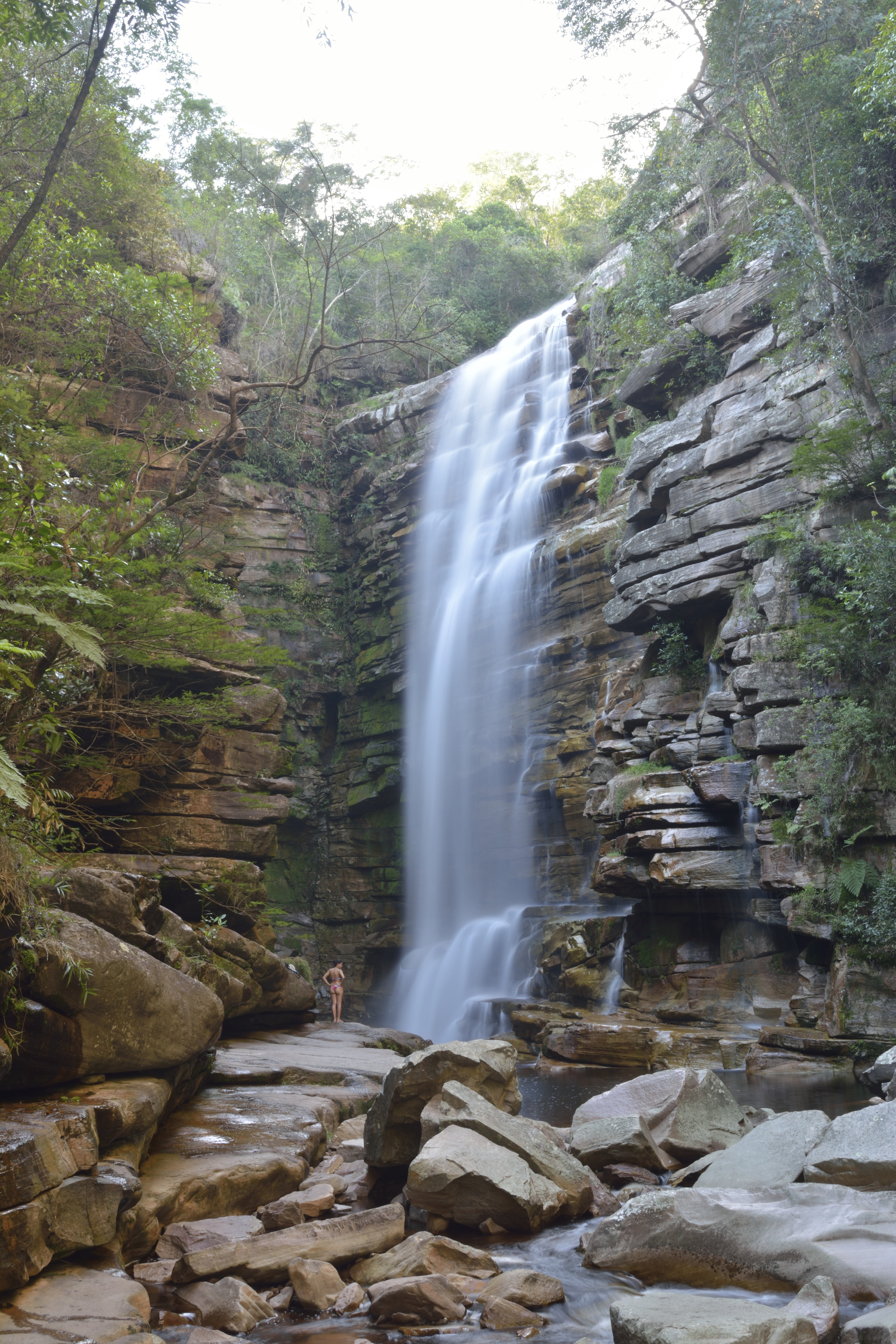
Cachoeira do Mosquito in Lençois - Bahia

== Climate ==
Lençóis has a tropical savanna climate (Köppen: Aw) with a hot, moderately rainy wet season and a warm drier season.

Climate data for Lençóis (1991–2020)
Month	Jan	Feb	Mar	Apr	May	Jun	Jul	Aug	Sep	Oct	Nov	Dec	Year
Mean daily maximum °C (°F)	31.7 (89.1)	31.8 (89.2)	31.3 (88.3)	29.9 (85.8)	28.3 (82.9)	27.0 (80.6)	26.5 (79.7)	27.4 (81.3)	29.5 (85.1)	31.5 (88.7)	30.7 (87.3)	31.1 (88.0)	29.7 (85.5)
Daily mean °C (°F)	25.5 (77.9)	25.8 (78.4)	25.3 (77.5)	24.4 (75.9)	23.2 (73.8)	21.8 (71.2)	21.3 (70.3)	21.9 (71.4)	23.5 (74.3)	25.0 (77.0)	24.9 (76.8)	25.2 (77.4)	24.0 (75.2)
Mean daily minimum °C (°F)	20.4 (68.7)	20.5 (68.9)	20.6 (69.1)	20.1 (68.2)	18.9 (66.0)	17.5 (63.5)	16.6 (61.9)	17.1 (62.8)	18.1 (64.6)	19.4 (66.9)	19.9 (67.8)	20.2 (68.4)	19.1 (66.4)
Average precipitation mm (inches)	133.1 (5.24)	93.9 (3.70)	164.3 (6.47)	113.6 (4.47)	62.5 (2.46)	55.7 (2.19)	41.5 (1.63)	40.4 (1.59)	26.4 (1.04)	75.5 (2.97)	135.0 (5.31)	115.8 (4.56)	1,057.7 (41.64)
Average precipitation days (≥ 1.0 mm)	8.0	7.8	9.7	9.8	8.2	8.1	7.4	6.4	4.5	4.7	9.3	—	—
Average relative humidity (%)	71.4	70.0	73.6	76.3	77.9	79.3	76.5	72.2	66.6	64.7	71.3	71.7	72.6
Average dew point °C (°F)	20.8 (69.4)	20.7 (69.3)	21.1 (70.0)	20.9 (69.6)	20.0 (68.0)	19.0 (66.2)	18.0 (64.4)	17.7 (63.9)	18.0 (64.4)	18.9 (66.0)	20.1 (68.2)	20.6 (69.1)	19.7 (67.5)
Mean monthly sunshine hours	202.0	186.6	203.9	183.4	166.0	153.5	174.4	191.8	194.4	201.1	161.7	183.3	2,202.1
Source: NOAA

== Notable people ==
- Júlio Afrânio Peixoto (born December 17 1876 in Lençóis) physician, writer, politician, historian, university president, and pioneering eugenicist.
