= San Rafael Airport (Chile) =

Airport in Valparaíso Region, Chile

- IATA: LOB; ICAO: SCAN

Summary
- Airport type: Public
- Serves: Los Andes
- Elevation AMSL: 2,457 ft / 749 m
- Coordinates: 32°48′50″S 70°38′48″W

Map
- Location of San Rafael Airport in Chile

Runways
Direction	Length		Surface
Direction	m	ft	Surface
05/23	750	2,461	Asphalt
- Source: Landings.com, Google Maps. GCM

San Rafael Airport (Spanish: Aeródromo de San Rafael de Los Andes) (IATA: LOB, ICAO: SCAN) is an airport serving Los Andes, a city in the Valparaíso Region of Chile. The airport is 5 kilometres (3.1 mi) west-northwest of the city.

It is the base of operations for the Latin American Aviation Training flight school.

The airport is within a mountain basin, and there is distant mountainous terrain in all quadrants. The Tabon VOR-DME (Ident: TBN) is located 11.5 nautical miles (21.3 km) west-southwest of the airport.

== See also ==
- Transport in Chile
- List of airports in Chile
