= Lontras =

- Municipality
- Flag Coat of arms

- Location in Santa Catarina, Brazil

- Location in Brazil
- Coordinates: 27°09′57″S 49°32′31″W
- Country: Brazil
- Region: South
- State: Santa Catarina
- Mesoregion: Vale do Itajai

Government
  - Mayor: Marcionei Hillesheim

Area
  - Total: 76.288 sq mi (197.586 km^{2})

Population (2020)
  - Total: 12,315
  - Density: 161.43/sq mi (62.327/km^{2})
- Time zone: UTC -3
- Website: www.lontras.sc.gov.br

Lontras is a municipality in the state of Santa Catarina in the South region of Brazil.

== See also ==
- List of municipalities in Santa Catarina
