= Lugh Ganane Airport =

Lugh Ganane Airport Luuq
- IATA: LGX; ICAO: HCMJ

Summary
- Airport type: Public
- Serves: Luuq
- Elevation AMSL: 495 ft / 151 m
- Coordinates: 3°48′45″N 42°32′45″E

Map
- Location of the airport in Somalia

Runways
Direction	Length		Surface
Direction	ft	m	Surface
18/36	3,675	1,120	Unpaved
- Source: Google Maps

Lugh Ganane Airport (IATA: LGX, ICAO: HCMJ) is an airport serving Luuq, Somalia.

== See also ==
- Transport in Somalia
