= Bluebird (disambiguation) =

A bluebird is one of several species in the songbird genus Sialia.

Bluebird or blue bird may also refer to:

== Arts and entertainment ==
=== Literature & theatre ===
- "The Blue Bird" (fairy tale), by Madame d'Aulnoy, published in 1697
- The Blue Bird (play), 1908, by Maurice Maeterlinck
- Bluebird Photoplays, American film production company and a subsidiary of Universal Pictures
- Bluebird, a book by Joshua Caleb Sutter

=== Comics ===
- Bluebird (Marvel Comics), a supporting character in Marvel Comics' Spider-Man series
- Bluebird (DC Comics), a supporting character in DC Comics' Batman series

=== Film and TV ===
- The Blue Bird (1910 film), a British silent film starring Pauline Gilmer and Olive Walter
- The Blue Bird (1918 film), an American silent film directed by Maurice Tourneur
- The Blue Bird (1940 film), an American fantasy film
- The Blue Bird (1976 film), a joint Soviet-American production directed by George Cukor
- ''Bluebird'' (1979 film), a DEFA Indianerfilm
- Bluebird (2004 film), a Dutch television film directed by Mijke de Jong
- Blue Bird (2011 film), a Belgian drama film
- Bluebird (2013 film), an American film directed by Lance Edmands
- Bluebirds (TV series), by the BBC
- "Bluebird", an episode from the limited series Steven Universe Future

=== Music ===
==== Albums ====
- Bluebird (Hank Jones album), 1956
- Blue Bird (Charles Mingus album), 1970
- Bluebird, 1982, by James Last
- Bluebird (Emmylou Harris album), 1989
- Blue Bird (EP), a 2013 extended play by Shouta Aoi
- Bluebird (Dawn Landes album), 2014
- Blue Bird, by Park Bo-gum, 2020

==== Songs ====
- "Blue Bird" (Russian folk song)
- "Blue Bird" (Korean folk song)
- The Blue Bird (Stanford), a partsong by Charles Villiers Stanford, 1910
- "Bluebird" (Buffalo Springfield song), 1967
- "Bluebird" (Paul McCartney and Wings song), 1973
- "Bluebird", by Helen Reddy from No Way to Treat a Lady, 1975
- "Bluebird", by Electric Light Orchestra from Secret Messages, 1983
- "Bluebird" (Anne Murray song), 1990
- "Bluebird", by The Boo Radleys from Learning to Walk, 1991
- "Bluebirds", by Adam Green from Friends of Mine, 2003
- "Blue Bird", by Kobukuro, 2003
- "Bluebird", by Jim White from Drill a Hole in That Substrate and Tell Me What You See, 2004
- "Blue Bird", by Cassie Steele from How Much for Happy, 2005
- "Blue Bird" (Ayumi Hamasaki song), 2006
- "Bluebird", by Spencer Krug from Beast Moans, 2006
- "Bluebird", by Katie Noonan from Skin, 2007
- "Blue Bird" (Ikimonogakari song), 2008
- "Bluebird", by Sara Bareilles from Kaleidoscope Heart, 2010
- "Bluebird", by Christina Perri from Lovestrong, 2011
- "Bluebird", by Dawn Landes from Bluebird, 2014
- "Bluebird", by Beach House from Depression Cherry, 2015
- "Bluebird" (Miranda Lambert song), 2019
- "Bluebird", by Little Big Town from Nightfall, 2020
- "Bluebird", by Something for Kate from The Modern Medieval, 2020
- "Bluebird" (Lana Del Rey song), 2025

== Businesses ==
=== In arts and entertainment ===
- Bluebird Cafe, a music club in Nashville, Tennessee
- Blue Bird Café, a nightclub in Montreal, Canada, where a 1972 arson-caused fire claimed 37 lives; see Blue Bird Café fire
- Blue Bird Inn, a jazz club in Detroit
- Bluebird Records, a subsidiary label of RCA Records
- Bluebird Toys, a British toy company

=== In transportation ===
==== Airlines ====
- Bluebird Airways, a Greek airline
- Bluebird Aviation, a Kenyan charter airline
- Blue Bird Aviation, a Sudanese charter airline
- Bluebird Cargo, a cargo airline based in Reykjavík, Iceland
- Bluebird Nordic, an Icelandic cargo airline

==== Ground transport operators ====
- Bluebird Bus and Coach, a bus operator in Greater Manchester, England
- Blue Bird Coach Lines, now a part of Coach USA
- Bluebird Group, an Indonesian transportation company
- Stagecoach Bluebird, a bus operator in Scotland

==== Vehicle manufacturers ====
- Blue Bird Corporation, an American manufacturer of buses and large passenger vehicles
- Bluebird Rail Operations, railway rolling stock manufacturer in Australia
- Bluebird Vehicles, a former British minibus manufacturer

=== In the food industry ===
- Blue Bird Bakeries, a brand name of Flowers Foods
- Bluebird Foods, a New Zealand division of the U.S. based PepsiCo corporation
- Bluebird Garage, a restaurant in London, formerly a racing garage

=== Other businesses ===
- BlueBird, communication satellites by AST SpaceMobile
- bluebird bio, a biotechnology firm
- Bluebird Gold Mine, a gold mine in Western Australia

== Places ==
- Blue Bird Lake, a lake for migratory birds in Haryana, India
- Bluebird Creek, a stream in Iowa, US
- Bluebird Gap, a gap in Georgia, US

== Sports ==
- Bluebird (horse), a Thoroughbred racehorse
- A member of Barrow A.F.C., nicknamed "Bluebird"
- A member of Cardiff City F.C., nicknamed "Bluebird"
- A member of Chippenham Town F.C., nicknamed "Bluebird"

== Transportation ==
- Blackburn Bluebird, a British aircraft
- Bluebird record-breaking vehicles, a series of cars and boats used by Sir Malcolm Campbell and Donald Campbell, to set speed records
- Blue Bird (train), a passenger train operated by the Wabash Railroad
- Bluebird Compartment Car (New York City Subway car)
- Nissan Bluebird, a car manufactured by the Nissan Motor Company
- Nickname for two types of New York City subway cars in their original paint scheme:
  - R33 World's Fair (New York City Subway car)
  - R36 World's Fair (New York City Subway car)
- South Australian Railways Bluebird railcar
- USS Bluebird, various US Navy vessels

== Other uses ==
- Blue bird (cocktail), made with gin
- Blue Birds, youngest members of the Camp Fire Girls
- Bluebird by American Express, a prepaid debit card
- Bluebird, a character in the Adventure Time episode "Ketchup"
- Bluebird Movement, another name for the 2024 Taiwanese legislative reform protests
- Bluebirds (Australian nurses), a group of Australian civilian nurses who served in French hospitals during World War I
- Project BLUEBIRD, a CIA project researching methods of interrogation
- Project Bluebird, a UK research partnership applying artificial intelligence to air traffic control; see Alan Turing Institute § Strategic Partners Board

== See also ==
- Bleubird, stage name of American rapper Jacques Bruna (born 1982)
- L'Oiseau bleu (disambiguation), French for "The Blue Bird"
