= Part song =

Form of choral music

A part song, part-song or partsong is a form of choral music that consists of a song to a secular or non-liturgical sacred text, written or arranged for several vocal parts. Part songs are commonly sung by an SATB choir, but sometimes for an all-male or all-female ensemble. Part songs are intended to be sung a cappella, that is without accompaniment, unless an instrumental accompaniment is particularly specified.

== In Britain ==
The part song was created in Great Britain, growing out of the madrigal tradition (though initially with more emphasis on homophonic harmony and less on polyphonic part writing) and the 18th century Glee. Paul Hillier describes the Glee as "a uniquely English creation...the convivial music of all-male musical societies". The classic Glee is "essentially a work for unaccompanied men's voices, in not less than three parts...simpler [than the madrigal] in texture, less sophisticated in design, and generally based on the simplest kind of diatonic harmony". One of the most famous examples is Samuel Webbe's Glorious Apollo, composed in 1790.

The part song was soon established as more suitable for mixed-voice choirs, its development marked by increasing complexity of form and contrapuntal content. It gradually attracted the attention of a wider range of composers. One of these was Felix Mendelssohn, already influential in the English choral tradition through his oratorios. Translated into English, his part songs became very popular in England. Mendelssohn was familiar with Glees, his teacher Carl Friedrich Zelter founded the Berliner Liedertafel in 1808, the German equivalent of the Glee club.

Part songs were quickly seen as a commercial opportunity by music publishers. From the early 1840s Novello and Co's Musical Times and Singing Class Circular included a simple piece of choral music (alternating secular and sacred) inside every issue, which choral society members subscribed to collectively for the sake of the music.

Early British composers of part songs include R. J. S. Stevens, John Liptrot Hatton, Henry Smart and George Alexander Macfarren, the latter renowned for his Shakespearean settings. Around the turn of the 20th century in the heyday of the part song, Hubert Parry, Charles Villiers Stanford and Edward Elgar were the principal exponents, often bringing a high-minded seriousness to their settings of great English poetry both contemporary and from earlier epochs. More recent major contributors to the genre include Ralph Vaughan Williams, Granville Bantock, Arnold Bax, Peter Warlock, Gustav Holst and Benjamin Britten (his Five Flower Songs of 1950). Interest declined rapidly from the 1950s as more specialist choirs began to champion the madrigal tradition.

Composers have also successfully used the part song medium to make contemporary arrangements of traditional folk songs, including those of Scotland, England, Wales and Ireland. Part songs can sometimes be sacred as well as secular. The unaccompanied liturgical anthem can be closely related in form and texture. Sullivan's Five Sacred Partsongs were published in 1871.

== In Europe ==
The first German Liedertafel male-voice music society, was founded in Berlin by Carl Friedrich Zelter in 1808. Heinrich Marschner and Carl Weber wrote examples for male voices only. These were followed by mixed-voiced pieces setting German romantic poetry by Schubert, Schumann, Mendelssohn, Peter Cornelius and Brahms. Similarly in France, the first Orphéons choral societies for men were established in the mid-19th century. Gounod, Saint-Saëns, Delibes, Debussy and Ravel all wrote examples for mixed-voice choirs.

== In Ukraine ==
In Ukraine part song replaced the Znamenny chant. About half a century before the advent of a party part song, the old hook notation began to be replaced by a non-linear one, close to the modern one. Orthodox fraternities initiated the introduction of party singing. They opened schools at monasteries and introduced the study of part song in fraternal and church choirs. The first mention of such a study is associated with the Lviv Stauropean Brotherhood and dates back to the 1590s. The theoretical foundations of part song have been set out in a number of treatises. The most famous of them and the only surviving (in several editions) - "Musical Grammar" by Mykola Diletsky.

According to the number of voices and the nature of polyphony, Ukrainian part songs are divided into three groups: party concerts, party motets and party works with constant polyphony. Party concerts include all works with 8 or more voices, and motets include party works of variable polyphony with 6 or less voices. Seven-part works have not yet been found, so they are not included in this classification, but most likely they must also be included in concerts. According to the themes of the texts and the predominant musical means, the part songs are divided into two large groups: vivatno-panegyric (glorious) and lyrical-dramatic (repentant).

== In the USA ==
The Mendelssohn Glee Club was founded in New York in 1866. Its second musical director was Edward MacDowell. Part songs flourished in the USA from 1860 well into the 1930s. Examples were composed by Amy Beach, Dudley Buck, George Whitefield Chadwick, Arthur Foote, Henry Hadley, Margaret Ruthven Lang, Edward MacDowell and Horatio Parker, and more recently by Randall Thompson and Elliott Carter.

== Examples ==
- Ye spotted snakes, text by Shakespeare, music by R. J. S. Stevens (1782)
- Abschied vom Walde ("Farewell to the Forest"), text by Joseph von Eichendorff, music by Felix Mendelssohn (1843)
- Lay a garland, music by Robert Lucas Pearsall (1854)
- Orpheus with his lute, text by Shakespeare, music by George Alexander Macfarren (1864)
- Sweet and Low, text by Tennyson, music by Joseph Barnby (1865)
- The Long Day Closes, text by Henry Chorley, music by Arthur Sullivan (1868)
- Waldesnacht, Op. 62, No. 3, text by Paul Heyse, music by Brahms (1874)
- Calme des nuits, Op 68 No 1, music by Saint Saens (1883)
- As Torrents in Summer, text by Longfellow, music by Edward Elgar (1896)
- The Bluebird, text by Mary Coleridge, music by Charles Villiers Stanford (1910)
- Twilight Night, text by Christina Rossetti, music by John Ireland (1922)
- Songs of Springtime, texts by six authors, music by E J Moeran (1930)
- Five Flower Songs, texts by four authors, music by Benjamin Britten (1950)
- Three Shakespeare Songs – text by Shakespeare, music by Vaughan Williams (1951)
