= L'oiseau bleu =

L'oiseau bleu is French for "The Blue Bird".

- The Blue Bird (fairy tale), a French fairy tale by Madame d'Aulnoy
- The Blue Bird (play), a Belgian play by Maurice Maeterlinck
- L'oiseau bleu (opera), an opera by Albert Wolff
- "L'Oiseau bleu" (song), a J-pop single by Mami Kawada
- L'Oiseau bleu (painting) by Jean Metzinger
- L'Oiseau Bleu (train), an express train between Antwerp and Paris
- L'Oiseau Bleu, a poem by Mary Coleridge, set to music as The Blue Bird

== See also ==
- Réunion swamphen, also known as oiseau bleu, a hypothetical extinct bird species for which there is no physical evidence of it ever existing
- Bluebird (disambiguation)
