= Bluebird (comics) =

Bluebird, in comics, refers to:

- Bluebird (Marvel Comics), a supporting character in Marvel Comics' Spider-Man series
- Harper Row, a supporting character in DC Comics' Batman series

== See also ==
- Bluebird (disambiguation)
