= Taftan =

Taftan (in Persian: تفتان Taftân) may refer to:

- Taftan Airlines, an Iranian airline
- Taftan (bread), a leavened flour bread from Persian cuisine
- Taftan County, an administrative division of Sistan and Baluchestan province, Iran
- Taftan, Pakistan, a town in Balochistan province of Pakistan
- Taftan (volcano), located in Sistan and Baluchestan province, Iran
- Taftan-e Jonubi Rural District, an administrative district of Taftan County, Sistan and Baluchestan province, Iran
