= Peruvian Naval Aviation =

- Fuerza de Aviacion Naval
- Active: 1919 - today
- Country: Peru
- Type: Naval aviation
- Size: 800
- Part of: Peruvian Navy
- Motto: Non deserit alta
- Anniversaries: December 9

Commanders
- Current commander: Rear Admiral Juan Carlos Zuñiga Lira

Insignia
- Roundel

Aircraft flown
- Attack helicopter: Agusta SH-3D; Agusta-Bell AB-212ASW; Kaman SH-2G Super Seasprite; Bell 206B
- Cargo helicopter: Mil Mi-8T
- Utility helicopter: Sikorsky UH-3H; Mil Mi-8T; Agusta-Bell 412SP
- Patrol: Fokker 60 MPA; Beechcraft 200T Super King Air; Fokker F-27-200
- Trainer: Beechcraft T-34C-1; Enstrom F-28F
- Transport: Fokker 60 UTA; Antonov An-32B; Beechcraft 200T Super King Air; Cessna 206 Stationair de Havilland Canada DHC-6

The Peruvian Naval Aviation (Spanish: Fuerza de Aviación Naval) is the air branch of the Peruvian Navy. It was originally formed in 1919 as the Naval Aviators Corps (Cuerpo de Aviadores Navales) but was merged in 1932 with the Peruvian Army Aviation. The service was recreated under its current name on July 3, 1963. It is currently made up of three operational squadrons and the Naval Aviation School (Escuela de Aviación Naval). The squadrons are distributed among three bases: Lima-Callao, which is part of Lima's Jorge Chávez International Airport, San Juan de Marcona and Pucallpa. About 800 personnel comprise Peruvian Naval Aviation.

== Organization ==
Naval Air Squadron 11

Tasked as maritime surveillance squadron, also undertakes MEDEVAC and transportation roles. Is based in the Callao Aeronaval Station at Jorge Chavez Airport.

- Fokker 60 MPA
- Beechcraft 200T Super King Air
- Fokker 50 SIGINT

Naval Air Squadron 21

Embarked for anti-submarine and anti-surface warfare missions for the Lupo-class frigate.

- Kaman SH-2G(P) Super Seasprite
- Agusta-Bell AB-212ASW

Naval Air Squadron 22

Had assigned the entire Sea King fleet, provides anti-submarine, anti-surface and general utility roles from ashore or embarked in the largest units of the fleet.

- Agusta-Sikorsky ASH-3D Sea King
- Sikorsky UH-3H Sea King

Naval Air Squadron 23

Provides logistical support and general utility helicopters

- Agusta-Bell AB-412SP

Naval Air Squadron 31

Basic training squadron for fixed-wing pilots, based at San Juan de Marcona aeronaval station.

- Beech T-34C-1 Turbo Mentor

Naval Air Squadron 32

Heavy-duty and general transportation squadron, operated also in the Amazon basin and VRAEM, includes:

- Fokker 60 UTA
- Antonov An-32B
- Cessna 206 Stationair
- Mil Mi-8T

Naval Air Squadron 33

Training squadron for helicopter pilots, based at Callao

- Enstrom F-28F

== Aircraft ==
Aircraft	Origin	Type	Version	In service	Notes
Electronic-warfare aircraft
Fokker 50	Netherlands	SIGINT	Fokker 50	2	Two aircraft built in 1996, both acquired with spare parts in October 2014, to be upgraded by FAdeA for use as signal intelligence platform
Fokker F27 Friendship	Netherlands	ELINT	Fokker F27 Friendship	1	
Maritime patrol aircraft
Beechcraft Super King Air	United States	maritime surveillance aircraft	B200T	5	equipped with surface-search radar and cameras for coastal surveillance and EEZ duties, the entire fleet received a complete upgrade of sensors and systems, finished in December 2010
Fokker 60	Netherlands	maritime patrol aircraft	Fokker 60 MPA	2	Two aircraft acquired in February 2010, delivered on June 8, 2010. equipped with surface-search radar and electronic countermeasures.
Combat aircraft
Bell 212	United States	ASW helicopter	AB‑212ASW	5	
Bell 206	United States	ASW helicopter		2	
Kaman SH-2G Super Seasprite	United States	ASuW / ASW helicopter	SH-2G(P)	5	Peruvian and Canadian defence authorities signed an agreement for five Kaman SH-2G Super Seasprite multirole helicopters. The deal covers the acquisition of SH-2G helicopters in service with the Royal New Zealand Navy (RNZN) since 2001.
Sikorsky SH-3 Sea King	United States	ASuW / ASW helicopter	ASH-3D	3	Four delivered in 1978, two in 1979, and four ordered in 1984; deliveries of only the first six confirmed. All but first four virtually identical in capability to Italian ASH-3Hs; equipped to carry AM39 Exocet anti-ship missiles.
Trainer aircraft
Beechcraft T-34 Mentor	United States	trainer aircraft	T-34C1	3	Six purchased in 1978; replaced surviving T-34As
Enstrom F-28	United States	training helicopter	F-28F	5	Six acquired in January 2008; all delivered before July. One lost in a training accident on July 9, 2009. Additional one acquired in 2010 for US$506,000.
Bell 212	United States	trainer aircraft	AB‑212ASW	2	Six transferred from Italy in 1976. two upgraded with RDR-1700B ISAR radars in 2009, one in storage. replace Bell 206 in training role, also used as utility aircraft
Utility aircraft
Fokker 60	Netherlands	utility aircraft	Fokker 60 UTA	2	Two aircraft and spare parts acquired in September 2010.
Mil Mi-8	Russia	transport helicopter	Mi-8	2	
Antonov An-32	Ukraine	transport aircraft	AN-32B	2	acquired from Hungary in 1994, fitted with ventral racks for general-purpose bombs, antisubmarine torpedoes and depth charges
Sikorsky SH-3 Sea King	United States	transport helicopter	UH-3H	6	Six acquired from the US Foreign Military Sales program along with 12 GE T58-GE-40 engines for US$6 million. First two delivered in December, 2010, to be employed in the Makassar class LPDs, two for the Coast Guard, two in storage.
Beechcraft Super King Air	United States	medical evacuation / liaison aircraft	B200T	1	
Cessna 206 Stationair	United States	liaison aircraft	Cessna 206	1	
Agusta-Bell 412SP	Italy	medical evacuation and SAR helicopter	AB-412SP	3	acquired from Royal Dutch Airforce in 2015; ex-RNLAF 303/SAR Sqn

== Recently decommissioned aircraft ==
Aircraft	Origin	Type	Version	Retired	Notes
Bell 206 JetRanger	United States	training helicopter	Bell 206B	2017	At least four acquired since 1982 from U.S.; one crashed in April 2002. Remaining 2 units receive a Night Vision Imaging System (NVIS) in February 2012, as a part of the NVIS upgrade program for the aircraft fleet, which includes cockpit modifications, NGV googles and training.

== Gallery ==
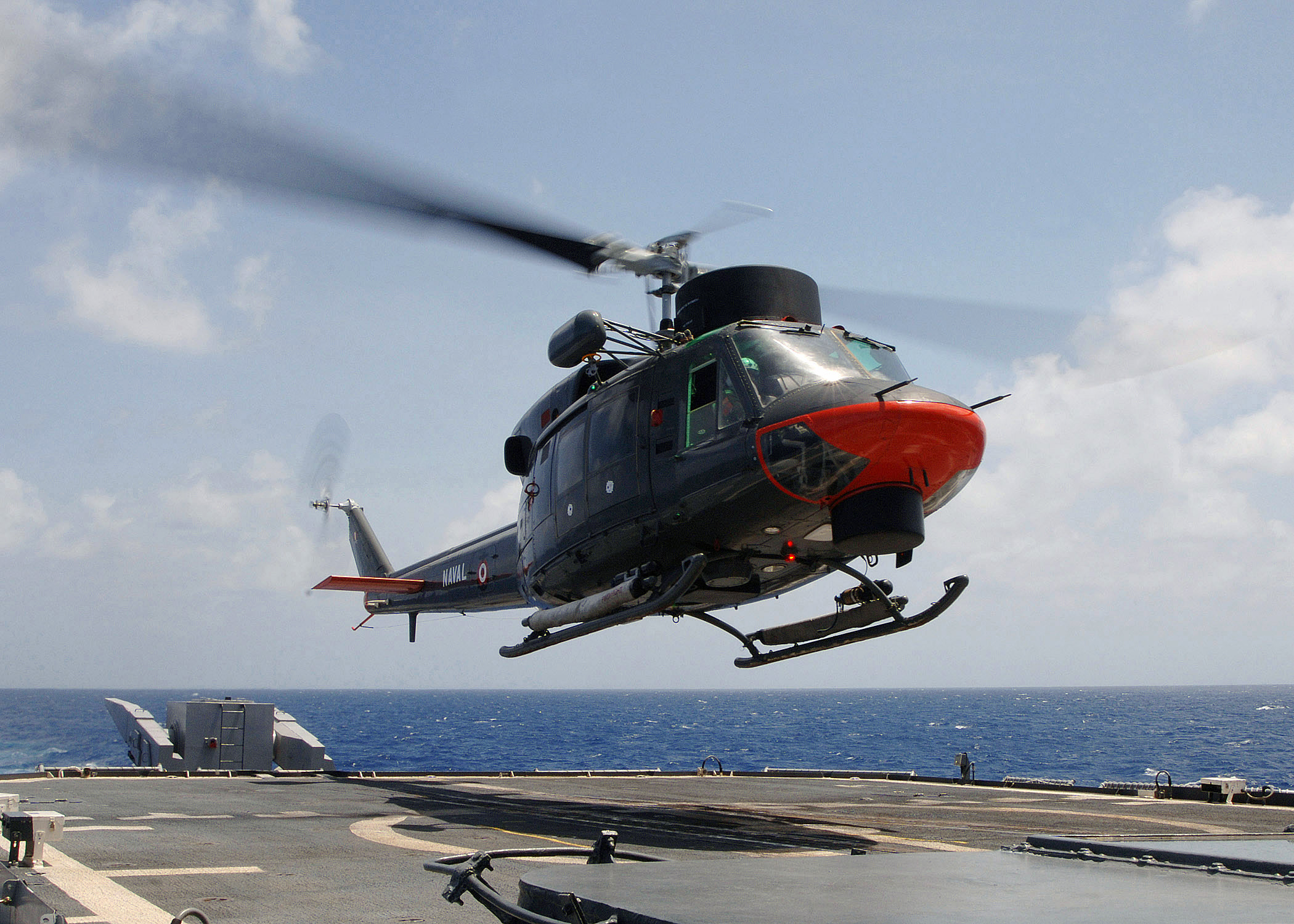
The AB-212ASW is the main embarked helicopter of the Peruvian Navy.

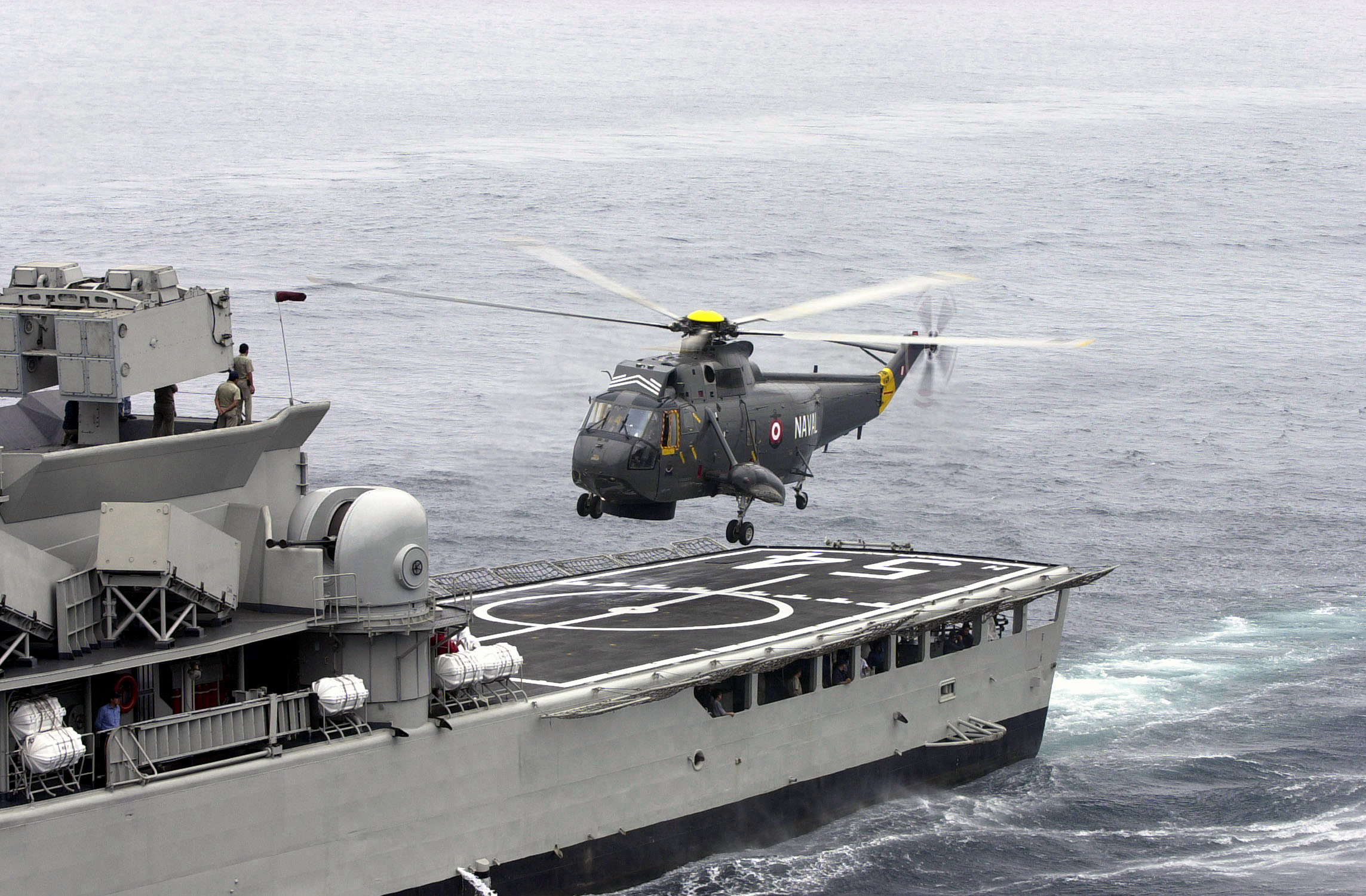
The ASH-3D Sea King can be armed with AM-39 Exocet missiles.
