= Freedom Airline Express =

Kenyan domestic scheduled and charter airline

IATA	ICAO	Call sign
4F	FDT	FREEDOM EAGLE
- Founded: 2008
- Hubs: Wilson Airport
- Focus cities: Nairobi and Mogadishu
- Fleet size: 8
- Headquarters: Nairobi, Kenya
- Website: freedomairexpress.com

Freedom Airline Express is an airline based in Nairobi, Kenya and in Mogadishu, Somalia. It operates domestic scheduled and charter services. Its main bases are Jomo Kenyatta International Airport, Nairobi and Aden Adde International Airport, Mogadishu.

== Fleet ==
As of July 2026, Freedom Airline Express operates the following aircraft:

Freedom Airline Express fleet
Aircraft	In service	Orders	Passengers	Notes
Bombardier CRJ200	2	—		
Embraer EMB 120 Brasilia	4	—		
Fokker 50	2	—		
Total	8			

=== Former fleet ===
As of August 2025, Freedom Airline Express operated 1 Airbus A320, 2 Bombardier CRJ200, 5 Embraer EMB 120 Brasilia and 2 Fokker 50 and
