= In dulci jubilo =

Traditional Christmas carol

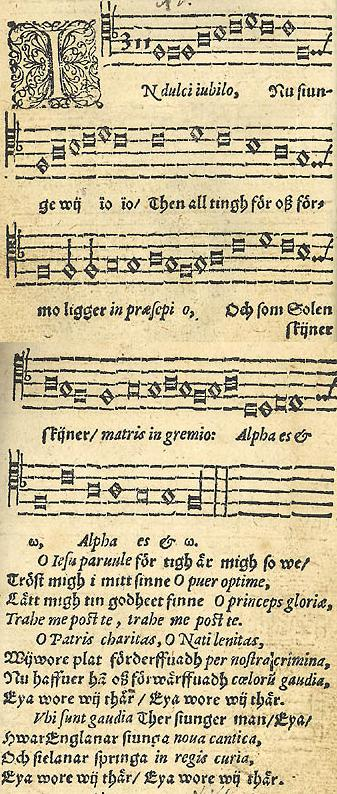
- The melody as published in the 1582 Finnish music collection Piae Cantiones, which alternates the Latin with Swedish.

Song
- Language: German, Latin

"In dulci jubilo" (Latin for "In sweet rejoicing") is a traditional Christmas carol. In its original setting, the carol is a macaronic text of German and Latin dating from the Middle Ages. Subsequent translations into English, such as J. M. Neale's arrangement "Good Christian Men, Rejoice" have increased its popularity, and Robert Pearsall's 1837 macaronic translation is a mainstay of the Christmas Nine Lessons and Carols repertoire. J. S. Bach's chorale prelude based on the tune (BWV 729) is also a traditional postlude for Christmas services.

== History and translations ==
The original song text, a macaronic alternation of Medieval German and Latin, is thought to have been written by the German mystic Heinrich Seuse circa 1328. According to folklore, Seuse heard angels sing these words and joined them in a dance of worship. In his biography (or perhaps autobiography), it was written:

Now this same angel came up to the Servant (Suso) brightly, and said that God had sent him down to him, to bring him heavenly joys amid his sufferings; adding that he must cast off all his sorrows from his mind and bear them company, and that he must also dance with them in heavenly fashion. Then they drew the Servant by the hand into the dance, and the youth began a joyous song about the infant Jesus ...

The tune, Zahn No. 4947, first appears in Codex 1305, a manuscript in Leipzig University Library dating from c. 1400, although it has been suggested that the melody may have existed in Europe prior to this date. In print, the tune was included in Geistliche Lieder, a 1533 Lutheran hymnal by Joseph Klug. It also appears in Michael Vehe's Gesangbuch of 1537. In 1545, another verse was added, possibly by Martin Luther. This was included in Valentin Babst's Geistliche Lieder, printed in Leipzig. The melody was also popular elsewhere in Europe, and appears in a Swedish/Latin version in the 1582 Finnish songbook Piae Cantiones, a collection of sacred and secular medieval songs.

The tune appears in several collections by Michael Praetorius, for voices only: Musae Sionae II (1607) no. 5, a motet à 8 for double choir; Musae Sionae V (1607) nos. 80–82 (for 2, 3 or 4 voices); Musae Sionae VI (1609) nos. 28, 29, 31 resp. 32, 33 all for 4 voices; and 5 part setting from Musae Sionae VI (1597). And a vocal–instrumental version from his collection Polyhymnia Caduceatrix et Panegyrica (1618–19), No 34: a festive multi-choir version with large instrumental support including trumpets and timpani. It can be executed by 7, 12, 16 or 20 voices in 5 choirs (three vocal, one chapel- and one instrumental choir) and general bass. The Praetorius settings were widely adapted in Protestant continental Europe.

A polyphonic arrangement for 8 voices was made by Robert Lucas Pearsall (1795–1856), this being later adapted for four voices, the most commonly performed version, by William Joseph Westbrook (1831–1894). A widely used arrangement in Carols for Choirs, Vol. 1 is Pearsall's edited by Reginald Jacques; the first two verses are in four-part harmony, the third and fourth verses are concatenated and in eight-part harmony. Carols for Choirs Vol. 4 contains simpler four- and three-part alternative arrangements.

There have been a number of translations of the Latin/German poem into English. The most popular that keeps the macaronic structure is Pearsall's 1837 translation, which retains the Latin phrases and substitutes English for German. A 2008 survey by BBC Music Magazine found this to be the second most popular choral Christmas carol with British cathedral organists and choirmasters.

Alternatively, a looser translation produced in 1853 by John Mason Neale titles the work "Good Christian Men, Rejoice". This translation is often criticised; Thomas Helmore made a mistake when transcribing the mensural notation of Piae Cantiones which led to the repeated "News, news" and "Joy, joy" phrase. In 1921, H. J. Massé wrote that it was an example of "musical wrong doing ... involving the mutilation of the rhythm of that grand tune In dulci jubilo to the English words Good Christian Men Rejoice. It is inconceivable that anyone of any real musical culture should have lent himself to this tinkering with a perfect tune for the sake of fitting it perforce to works of inferior merit." He goes on to cite a more appropriate English translation from 1567 by John Wedderburn as a more "worthy effort". Jeremy Summerly in his radio documentary series A Cause for Caroling is more complimentary, saying that the mistaken repeated note is what makes that version of the tune memorable.

Still another English translation, made in the 19th century by Arthur T. Russell and featured in several Lutheran hymnals, renders the work as "Now Sing We, Now Rejoice".

== Tune ==
Source

== First verse textual comparison ==
German/Latin text
by Heinrich Seuse, c. 1328

In dulci jubilo,
Nun singet und seid froh!
Unsers Herzens Wonne
Leit in praesepio;
Und leuchtet wie die Sonne
Matris in gremio.
Alpha es et O!

English literal translation

In sweet rejoicing,
now sing and be glad!
Our hearts' joy
lies in the manger;
And it shines like the sun
in the mother's lap.
You are the Alpha and Omega!

Translation by Wedderburn, c. 1567

Now let us sing with joy and mirth,
In honour of our Lordes birth,
Our heart's consolation
Lies in præsepio,
And shines as the sun,
Matris in gremio.
Alpha is and O, Alpha is and O.

Translation by Pearsall, 1837

In dulci jubilo,
Let us our homage shew!
Our heart's joy reclineth
In praesepio;
And like a bright star shineth
Matris in gremio.
Alpha es et O!

Good Christian Men Rejoice
by Neale, 1853

Good Christian men, rejoice
With heart, and soul, and voice;
Give ye heed to what we say:
News! News!
Jesus Christ was born to-day:
Ox and ass before Him bow,
And He is in the manger now.
Christ is born today! Christ is born today.

== Influence in music ==
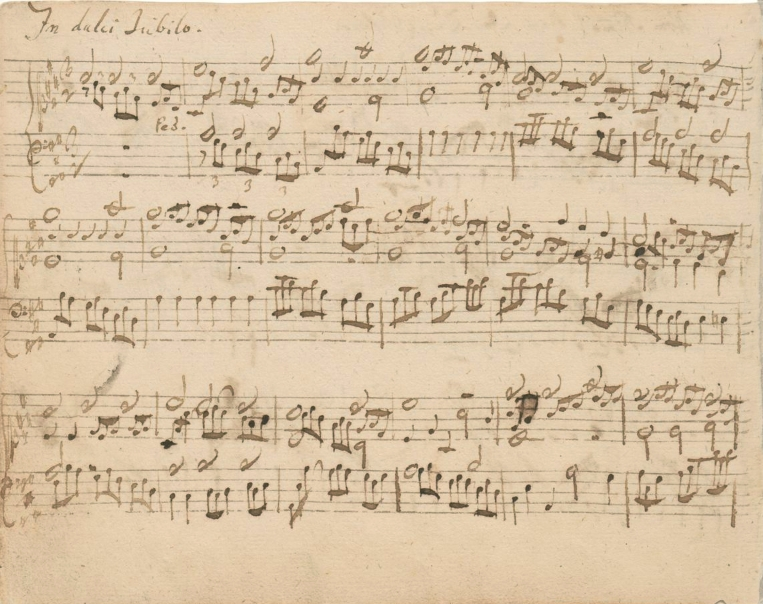
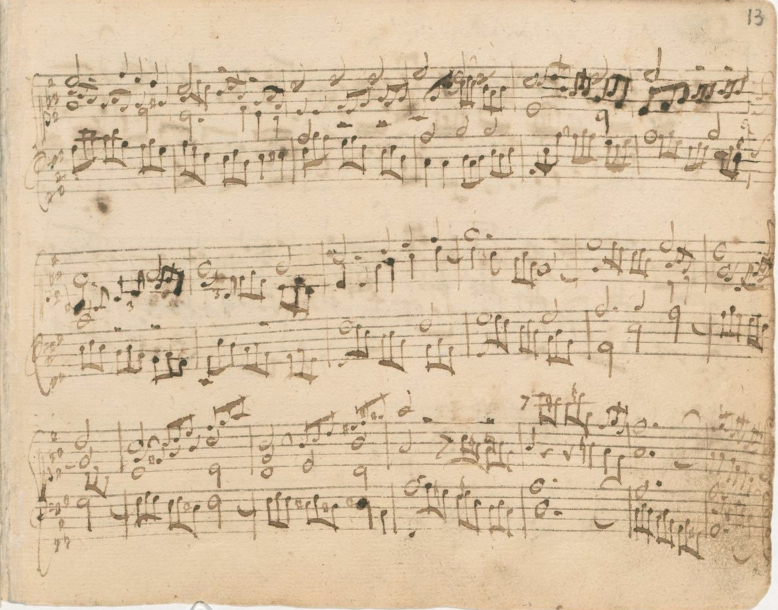
Autograph manuscript of "In dulci jubilo", BWV 608, from the Orgelbüchlein of J. S. Bach

In dulci jubilo (BWV 608)
For organ, from the Orgelbüchlein (MIDI rendition)

Dieterich Buxtehude set the melody as a chorale-cantata in 1683 for soprano, alto and bass accompanied by two violins and continuo (BuxWV 52) and as a chorale prelude for organ (BuxWV 197) c. 1690.

Johann Sebastian Bach set this melody several times: as a chorale in BWV 368; and then for organ in BWV 608 as a double canon in his Orgelbüchlein and in BWV 729 and BWV 751 as a chorale prelude. Commentators agree, however, that BWV 751 is too simple and undeveloped to be the work of Bach. Since the 1984 rediscovery of the Neumeister Collection, BWV 751 has been attributed to Johann Michael Bach. Bach also used the opening phrase of the melody as a fugal subject for two other choral preludes, BWV 703 (Gottes Sohn ist kommen) and BWV 724 (Gott durch deine Güte). BWV 729, written by Bach to accompany congregational singing in Arnstadt, is traditionally performed as the first organ voluntary at the end of the Festival of Nine Lessons and Carols at King's College, Cambridge. This voluntary was first introduced to the service in 1938 by organ scholar Douglas Guest.

Franz Liszt included the carol in his piano suite Weihnachtsbaum in the movement entitled "Die Hirten an der Krippe" (The Shepherds at the Manger). Norman Dello Joio uses the theme as the basis of his Variants on a Medieval Tune for wind ensemble. Ronald Corp composed a setting of "In dulci jubilo" for unaccompanied SATB choir in 1976.

Gustav Holst included both "Good Christian Men, Rejoice" (Neale version, 1853) and "God Rest You Merry, Gentlemen" in his 1910 choral fantasy Christmas Day, with accompaniment for orchestra or organ.

Thomas Pynchon uses the carol as the choral centrepiece of the Advent episode in his 1973 novel, Gravity's Rainbow. The singing, presided over by a nameless Jamaican countertenor, is described as "the War's evensong" (p. 130), and culminates thus:

climaxing now with its rising fragment of some ancient scale, voices overlapping three- and fourfold, up, echoing, filling the entire hollow of the church—no counterfeit baby, no announcement of the Kingdom, not even a try at warming or lighting this terrible night, only, damn us, our scruffy obligatory little cry, our maximum reach outward—praise be to God!—for you to take back to your war-address, your war-identity, across the snow's footprints and tire tracks finally to the path you must create by yourself, alone in the dark. Whether you want it or not, whatever seas you have crossed, the way home... (p. 136)

== Recordings ==
An instrumental arrangement of the Pearsall version by English musician Mike Oldfield, "In Dulci Jubilo", reached number 4 in the UK singles chart in January 1976.

== See also ==
- List of Christmas carols
