= Fokker 50 =

Regional airliner by Fokker

Fokker 50 / Fokker 60
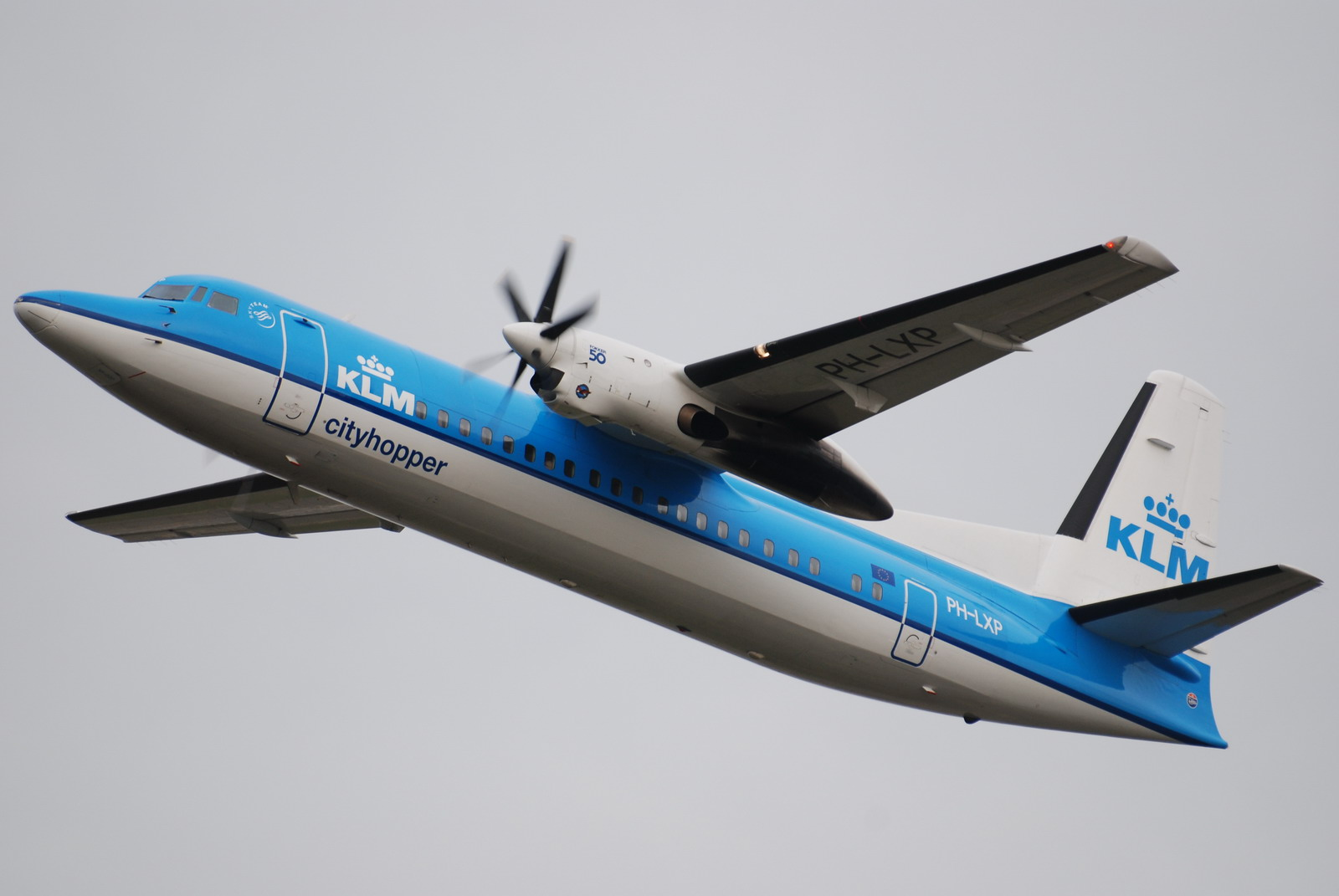
- KLM Cityhopper Fokker 50

General information
- Type: Turboprop regional airliner
- National origin: Netherlands
- Manufacturer: Fokker
- Status: In service
- Primary users: PopulAir Skyward Express; Air Panama; Mahan Air
- Number built: 213

History
- Manufactured: 1985–1997
- Introduction date: 1987
- First flight: 28 December 1985
- Developed from: Fokker F27 Friendship

The Fokker 50 is a turboprop-powered airliner manufactured and supported by Dutch aircraft manufacturer Fokker. It was designed as an improved version of the successful Fokker F27 Friendship. The Fokker 60 is a stretched freighter version of the Fokker 50.

The Fokker 50 was developed during the early 1980s following a decline in the sales of the company's earlier F27 Friendship. It was decided that the new airliner would be a derivative of its predecessor, sharing much of its airframe and design features, while incorporating new advances and several improvements, such as the adoption of Pratt & Whitney Canada PW127B turboprop engines, in order to produce a successor that had a 30 percent reduction in fuel consumption over the F27.

The Fokker 50 performed its maiden flight on 28 December 1985, and entered revenue service during 1987. The Fokker 60 has been operated by the Royal Netherlands Air Force (RNLAF), ex-RNLAF aircraft are also in service with the Peruvian Naval Aviation and the Republic of China's Air Force.

== Development ==
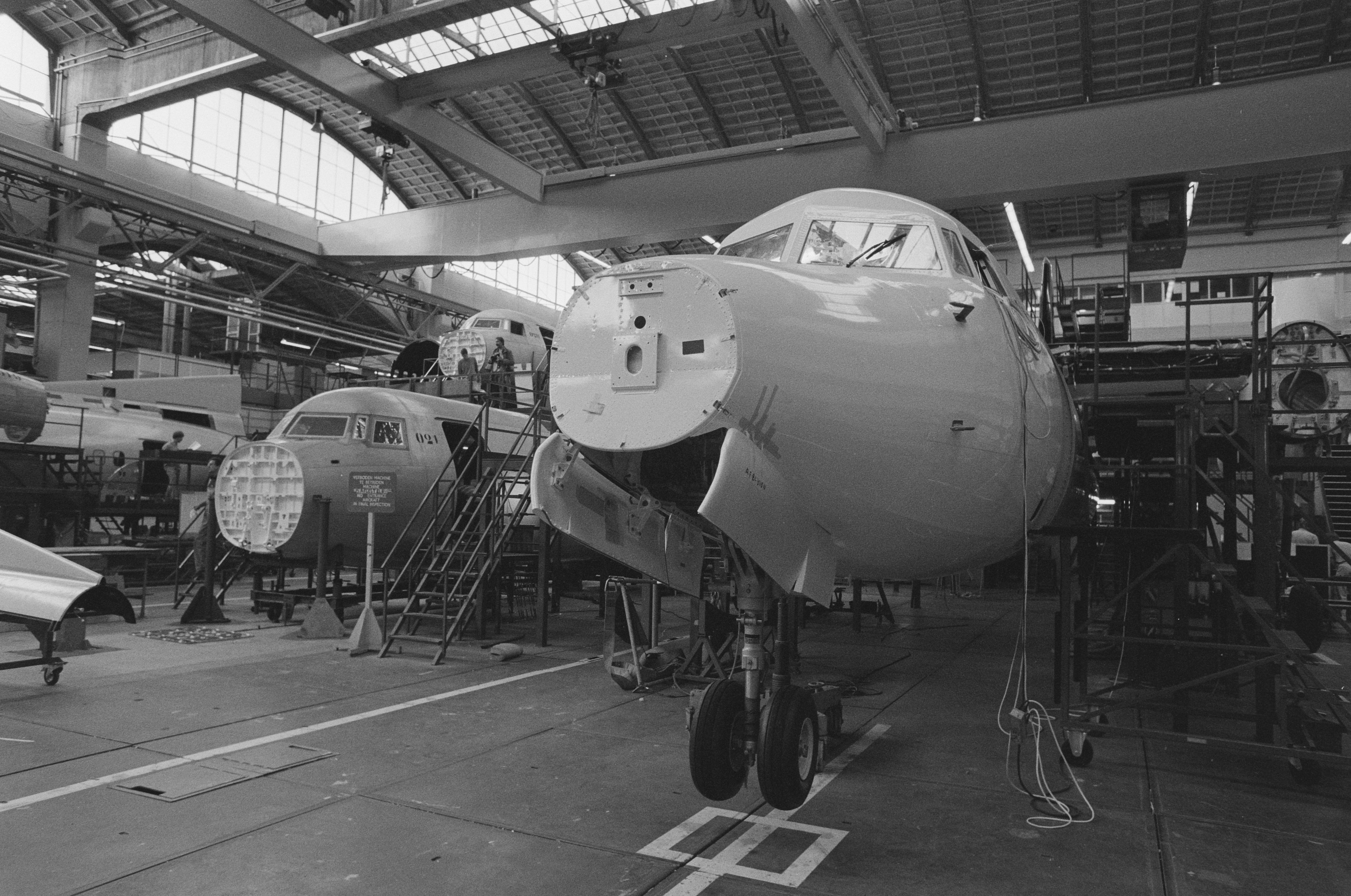
Fokker 50 airliners being assembled, August 1987

=== Fokker 50 ===
By the early 1980s, the Dutch aircraft manufacturer Fokker had identified that sales of the Fokker F27 Friendship, a turboprop-powered airliner which had been in continual production since 1958, were beginning to decline. Accordingly, the company decided to conduct a series of design studies for follow-up products to the key elements of their existing product line, these being the centered around the F27 and the Fokker F28 Fellowship jet airliner. In November 1983, Fokker decided to commence simultaneous work on two development projects to develop a pair of new airliners - these being the Fokker 100, which was to succeed the F28, and the Fokker 50, which was the successor to the F27. The Fokker 50 programme suffered some delays, leading to the first aircraft being delivered more than a year following the final F27 delivery.

The Fokker 50 was basically an amalgamation of various refinements and improvements which had been made to the design of the F27 Friendship. As a result of these modifications, such as the adoption of Pratt & Whitney Canada PW127B turboprop engines, Fokker was able to progressively reduce the F27's fuel consumption by 30 per cent. Various different propeller designs were adopted over timespan of the aircraft's production, while an increasing proportion of composite materials were used in the airframe, adjustments to the wing design, and a higher degree of cockpit automation were areas of major advances of the Fokker 50 over its predecessor.

Fokker partnered with several companies to manufacture portions of the Fokker 50; these included the wing being produced by Belgian aerospace firm SABCA, fuselage sections made by French aircraft manufacturer Dassault Aviation, flaps and other components manufactured by German aerospace company Messerschmitt-Bölkow-Blohm (MBB), and vertical stabilizers and horizontal stabilizers built by Japanese multinational corporation Fuji Heavy Industries. A pair of prototypes, derived from F27 airframes, were produced; on 28 December 1985, the first of these prototypes performed its maiden flight. In 1987, certification of the Fokker 50 by the Dutch aviation authority RLD was successfully completed, and the first production aircraft was subsequently delivered to German airline DLT Luftverkehrsgesellschaft (DLT). DLT and Ansett Australia served as the airliner's launch customers.

=== Termination and further development ===
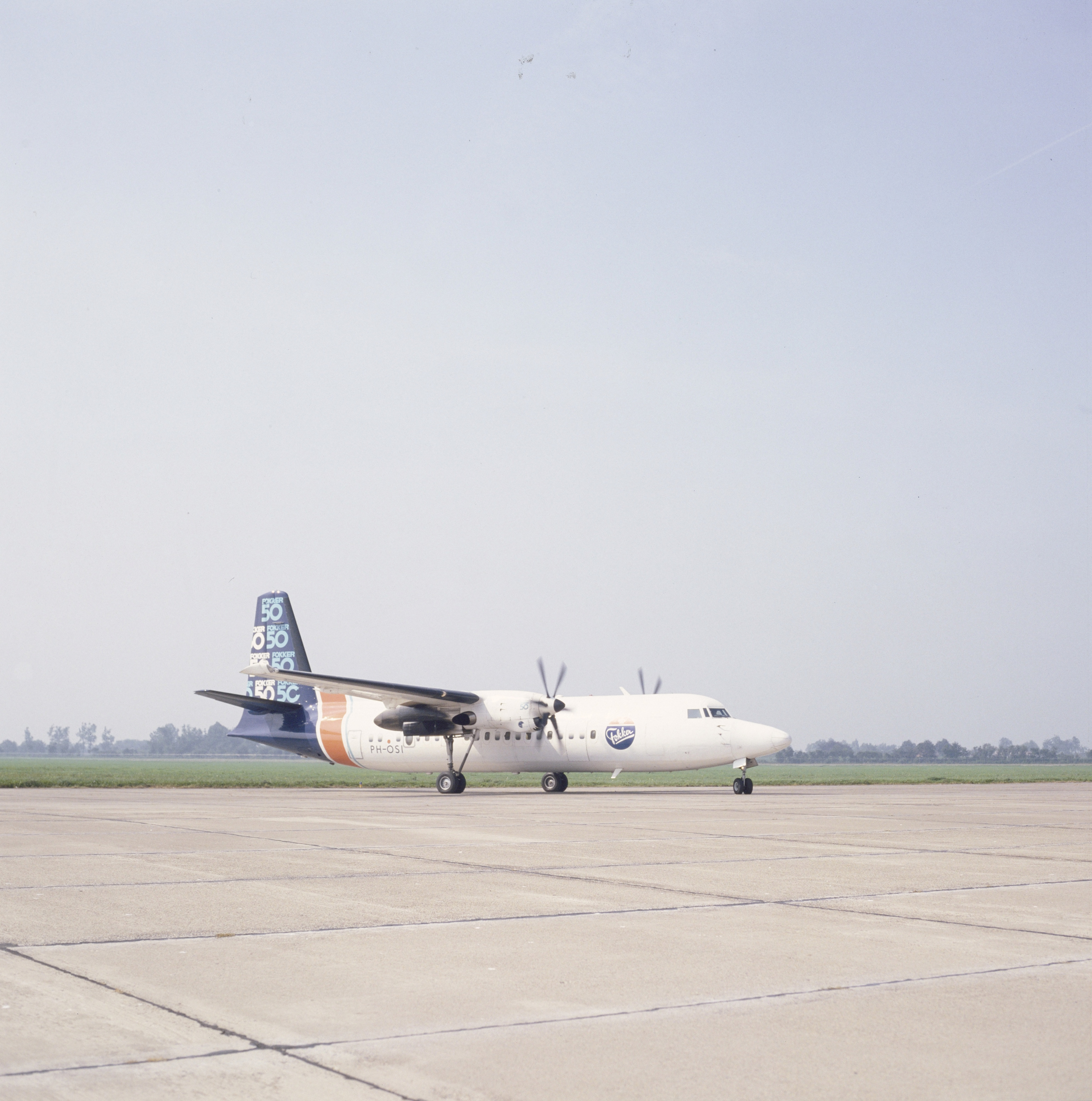
Fokker 50 prototype

During 1994, Fokker had been incurring sizable losses on its operations, which led to cuts in the output of the Fokker 50 and threatened its long term viability. During early 1995, the firm embarked upon a major restructuring programme, including efforts to renegotiate prices with its suppliers, in what was viewed by aerospace publication Flight International as a last-ditch effort to save the company in its current form. By July 1995, Fokker was in negotiations with the Dutch government over the terms for a potential bailout of the company as losses continued to mount. Fokker's owner, Daimler-Benz Aerospace AG (DASA), had agreed to provide a rescue deal for the company, but this was contingent upon Dutch government participation.

In March 1996, production of the Fokker 50 was terminated as a consequence of Fokker itself having been forced into a state of bankruptcy. The financial difficulties suffered by the firm had been in part caused by the massive cost overruns which had been incurred on both the Fokker 50 and Fokker 100, as well as due to intense competition within the regional airliner sector that Fokker had designed and marketed these aircraft towards, which had not been helped by delays to the program in the face of multiple modern competitors in the form of the Saab 340, ATR 42 and Bombardier Dash 8. Despite repeated increases cost-efficiency of production realised within the final 12 months of production, these did not prove enough to save the company.

During 1997, as a result of the company having entered into liquidation, the final Fokker 50 aircraft was delivered that year. By the end of the program, a total of 213 Fokker 50s had been completed. As early as May 1996, proposals for the partial or complete restart of production of the type were mooted, amongst these being interest from Indian aerospace firm Hindustan Aeronautics Limited in establishing a Fokker 50 assembly line in India, however these did not come about.

In 1996, Fokker Services was established; holding the type certificate for the Fokker 50, the organisation provides comprehensive support and services to operators of the type, including training, logistics support, maintenance, modification, and engineering services. By August 2006, 171 Fokker 50 aircraft remained within airline service; major operators included: Avianca (10), Denim Air (12), Skyways Express (18) and VLM Airlines (20). Some 27 other airlines including Air Astana also operated smaller numbers of the type.

=== Fokker 60 ===
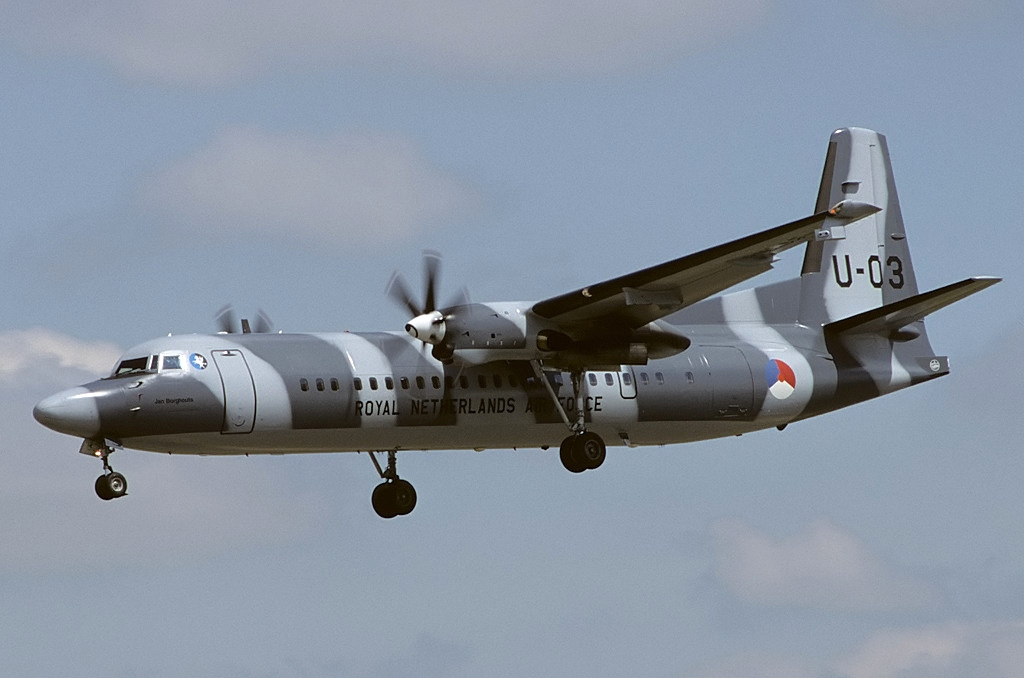
Fokker 60 of the Royal Netherlands Air Force

The Fokker 60 was a stretched version of the Fokker 50, being 1.62 m (5.3 ft) longer for a total length of 26.87 m (88.2 ft). It featured a large cargo door on the right side, immediately behind the cockpit, for loading/unloading. Only four examples of the Fokker 60 were ever completed, all of which were delivered to the Royal Netherlands Air Force. All of them were part of 334 Squadron based at Eindhoven Airport. The type was typically used to transport equipment and soldiers, and it was also occasionally used for paradrop operations.

Another 60 was under construction, but ultimately never completed due to Fokker's bankruptcy. In 2005, a pair of Fokker 60s (U-01, U-03) were converted to serve as maritime patrol aircraft as a temporary solution when it was decided to phase out the Royal Netherlands Navy P-3 Orions as a result of budget cuts. For two years, these aircraft were stationed at Hato AB Curaçao prior to their replacement in the form of civil-operated Bombardier DHC-8 aircraft in October 2007. Due to the Royal Netherlands Air Force having decided to procure two extra Lockheed C-130s, the Fokker 60s were phased out. All four Fokker 60 that were stored at Woensdrecht Air Base were sold to the Peruvian Naval Aviation, the first two planes were delivered on 8 June 2010 and the second batch of two planes were delivered at the end of 2010.

== Design ==
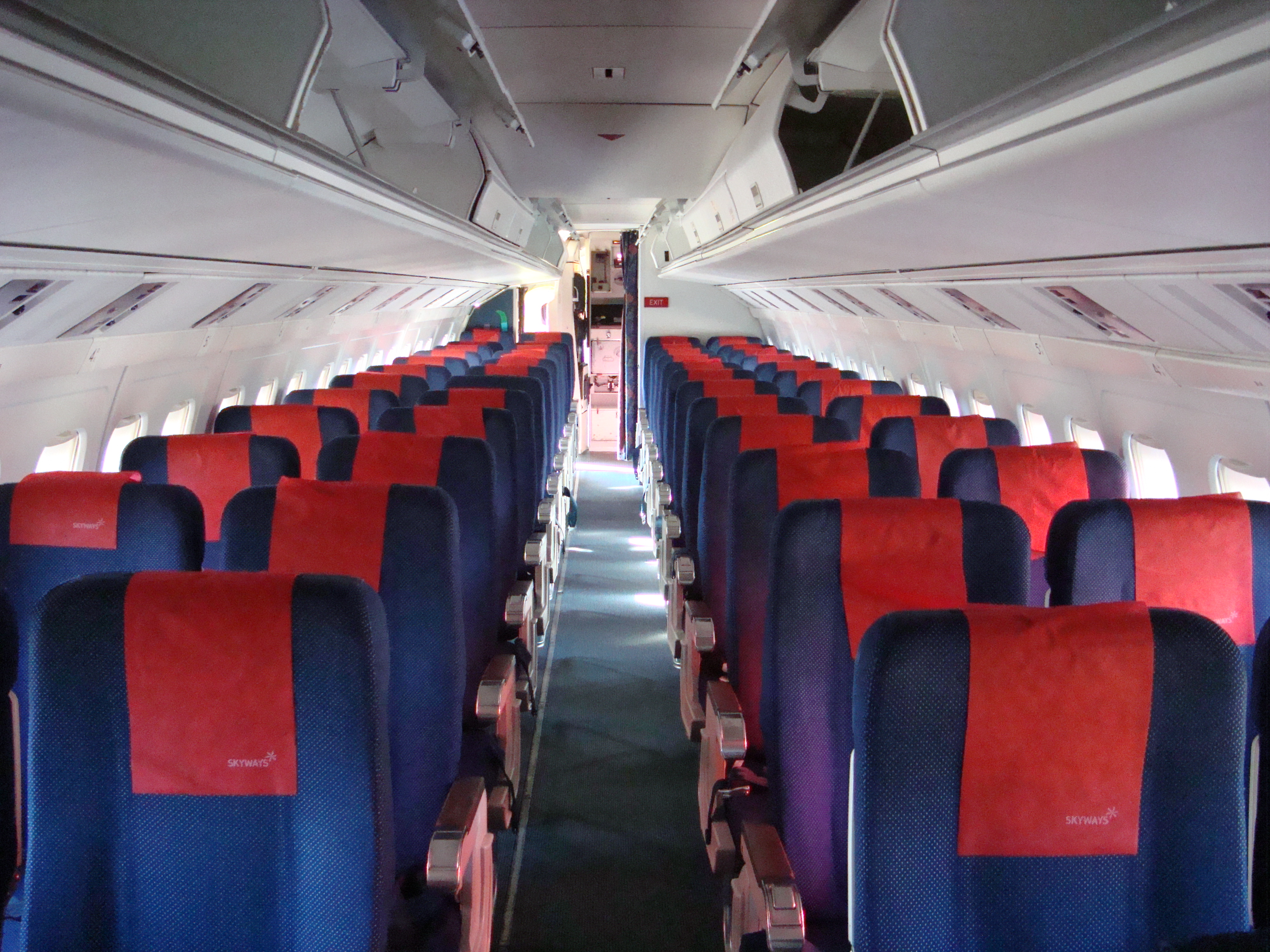
Four-abreast cabin

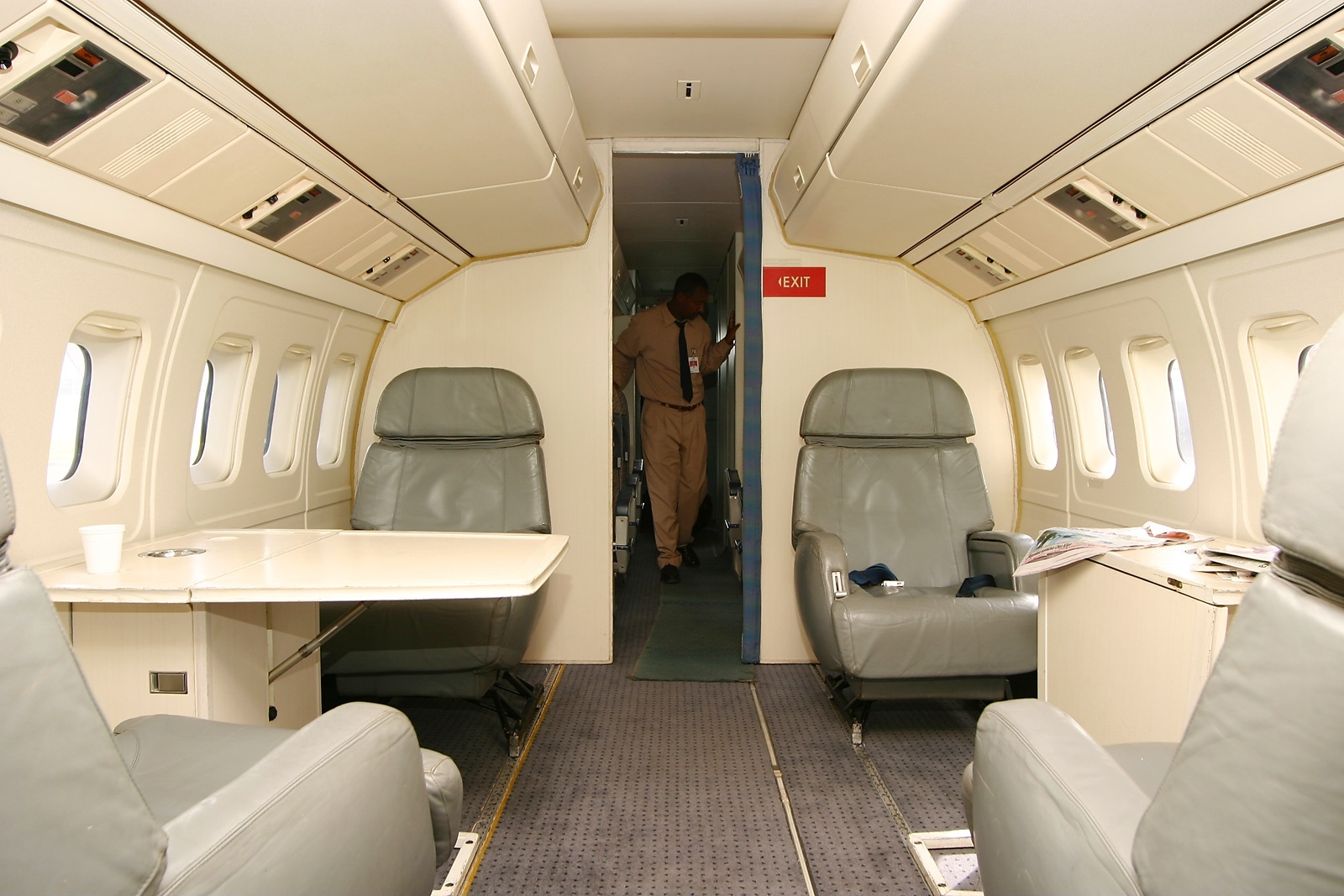
Main cabin of a government-configured Fokker 50

The Fokker 50 is a twin turboprop-powered airliner. It was based on the earlier highly successful Fokker F27 Friendship, specifically the stretched F27-500 model. Structurally, the Fokker 50 owes much to the F27; basic construction of the fuselage, wings and empennage, which made extensive use of composite materials, hot-bonded structures and anti-corrosion treatments, remained mainly unchanged between the two aircraft apart from the strengthening of various sections where required. There were some changes made to specific areas of the aircraft, such as the wing being equipped with upturned ailerons and wingtips that effectively acted as wing endplates or winglets, it was also fitted with a larger number of smaller windows in the fuselage and a new two-wheel nose gear configuration, the latter enabling stable operations under uneven crosswind conditions.

Perhaps the most significant design change from the preceding Fokker F27 was the choice of engines used for the Fokker 50. The original Rolls-Royce Dart turboprop engines that had powered various marks of the F27, which had broadly provided between 1,268 and 1715 kW (1,700-2,300 hp), were replaced by a pair of more fuel efficient Pratt & Whitney Canada PW124 powerplants, each capable of generating 1,864 kW (2,500 hp), which drove sets of six-bladed Dowty Rotol propellers. These slow-turning propellers, along with other measures such as vibration absorbers, eliminate the need for active noise control systems while providing an average cabin noise level of 77 dBs.

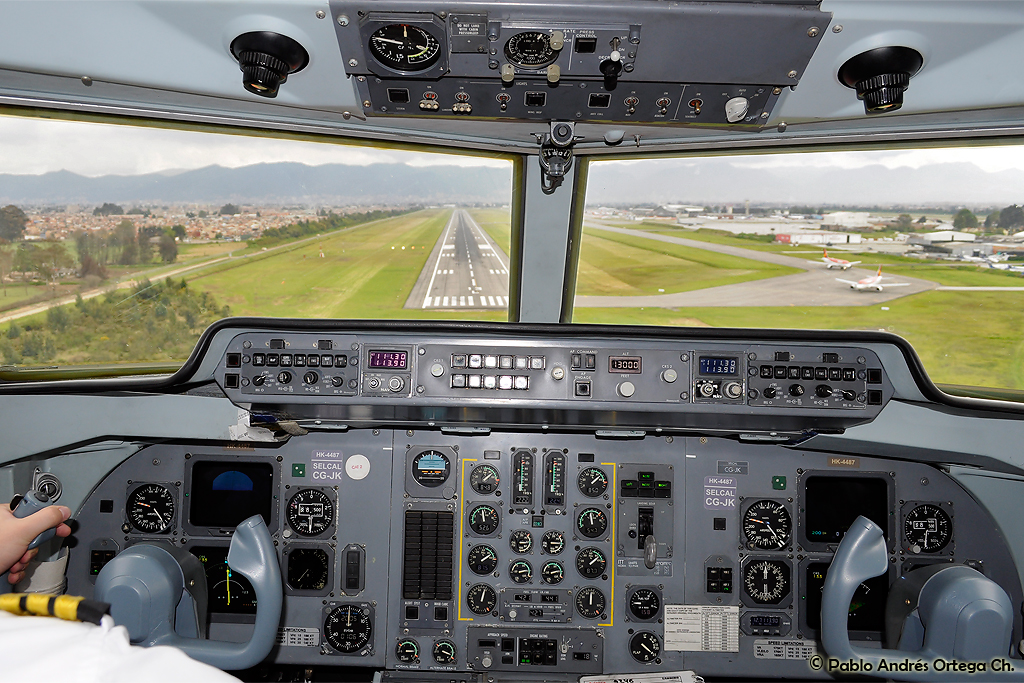
Glass cockpit of a Fokker 50

The Fokker 50, unlike the F27, was furnished with a glass cockpit which incorporated an electronic flight instrument system and an automatic flight control system, the latter being certified for conducting Cat II approaches. The flying controls include a unique single lever that is capable of controlling both engine power and actuating the variable-pitch propellers, reducing complexity and pilot workload. The cockpit also features a three-stage integrated alerting system that issues warnings to the flying crew.

The Fokker 50 can carry up to 62 passengers over a range of 1,080 nmi (1,240 mi; 2,000 km) at a typical speed of 286 knots (530 km/h; 329 mph), a 27 knots (31 mph; 50 km/h) increase over the Fokker F27. Typical passenger seating arrangements range from 46 to 56 passengers, which includes overhead bins and a relatively wide central aisle. The airliner features four external doors along with integral airstairs, which enables quicker turnaround times through the faster egress and boarding of passengers and crew alike. Features such as an auxiliary power unit (APU), new generation slim seating and LED lighting in the cabin are also available as options and can be retrofitted to existing aircraft based upon customer demand.

The Fokker 50 is capable of using the majority of airports worldwide, including operations from unpaved surfaces, and has been described as possessing "first-rate short field performance" and capable of performing steep approaches to access airports such as London City Airport. The type has typically been marketed toward replacing older commuter and regional airliners in the 19-50 seat range. Although of possessing a design heavily dependent upon a previous generation of airliners, the Fokker 50 has often been highly appreciated by owners and pilots alike for its reliability, economics and flight characteristics. According to Fokker Services, the Fokker 50 possesses relatively low operational costs per trip and attributes this to its low maintenance costs, high reliability, competitive support.

== Variants ==
=== Fokker 50 ===
F27 Mark 050
Marketed as the Fokker 50 (or sometimes referred to as the Fokker 50-100), based on the F27 Mark 500 with two Pratt & Whitney Canada PW125B or PW127B turboprop engines with six-bladed propellers, updated systems and cockpit instrumentation, increased use of composite structure, double the number of windows, change from pneumatic to hydraulic systems and addition of electronic engine and propeller controls and an electronic flight instrument system (EFIS) and integrated warning system.
F27 Mark 0502
Marketed as the Fokker 50, same as the 050 with reconfigured interior layout and change in type of aft emergency exits, six built (two for the Royal Netherlands Air Force, two for the Republic of Singapore Air Force and two for Royal Brunei Air Force). MSN 20280 built 1993 was fitted with PW125B Engines and an APU.

=== Fokker 60 ===
F27 Mark 0604
Marketed as the Fokker 60, same as the 0502 with an increased fuselage length (1.02 m (3.3 ft) in front of wing and 0.80 m (2.6 ft) aft of wing), increased design weight and introduction of a large cargo door in the forward right side of the fuselage. Two Pratt & Whitney PW127B turboprop engines, four built.

== Operators ==
=== Fokker 50 civil operators ===
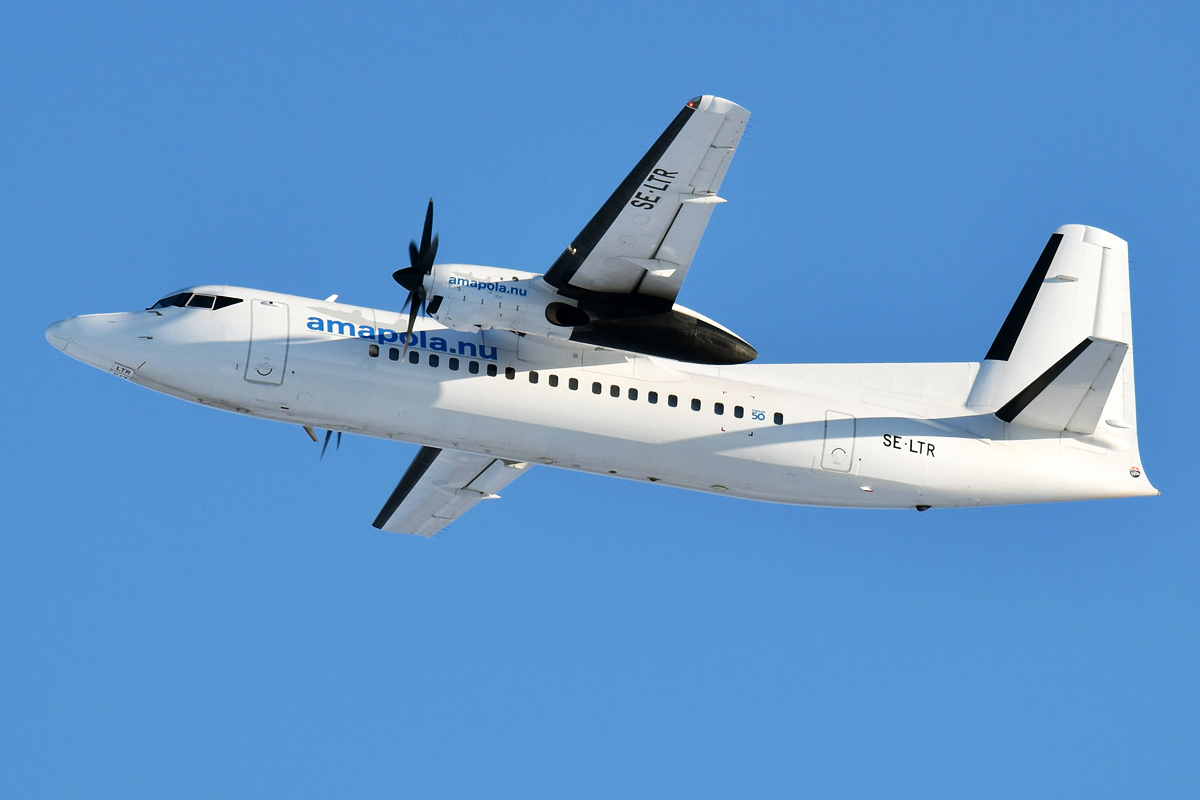
Amapola Flyg (currently known as Populair) is currently the largest remaining Fokker 50 operator worldwide.

As of August 2022, 73 Fokker 50 aircraft were in commercial service including:

- Aero-Pioneer Group (1)
- Aerojet Aviation (1)
- Air Panama (5) 1 lost in 2025.
- Amapola Flyg (Populair) (12)
- ATSA Airlines (1)
- Blue Bird Aviation (1)
- Buffair Services (1)
- Busy Bee Congo (1)
- Eldinder Aviation (1)
- Freedom Airline Express (2)
- Gomair (2)
- I-Fly Air (1)
- Jetways Airlines (3)
- Jubba Airways (2)
- Leading Edge (6)
- Mandeeq Air (1)
- MAYAir (2)
- Mongolian Airways (1)
- Niger Airlines (1)
- Orient Aviation Services (1)
- Renegade Air (2)
- Rudufu (2)
- Silverstone Air Services (8)
- SkyAir (2)
- Skyward Express (9)
- Som Express Airways (1)
- Taftan Airlines (2)

=== Fokker 50 and 60 military and government operators ===
The following governments or military operators currently fly the Fokker 50 and Fokker 60 in passenger or cargo roles:

Peru

- Peruvian Naval Aviation (2 Fokker 50, 2 Fokker 60)

Singapore

- Republic of Singapore Air Force (9)

Taiwan

- Republic of China Air Force (3)

Thailand

- Royal Thai Police (1)

Tanzania

- Tanzania Government Flight Agency (1 F50); still in service as of 2025

=== Former operators ===
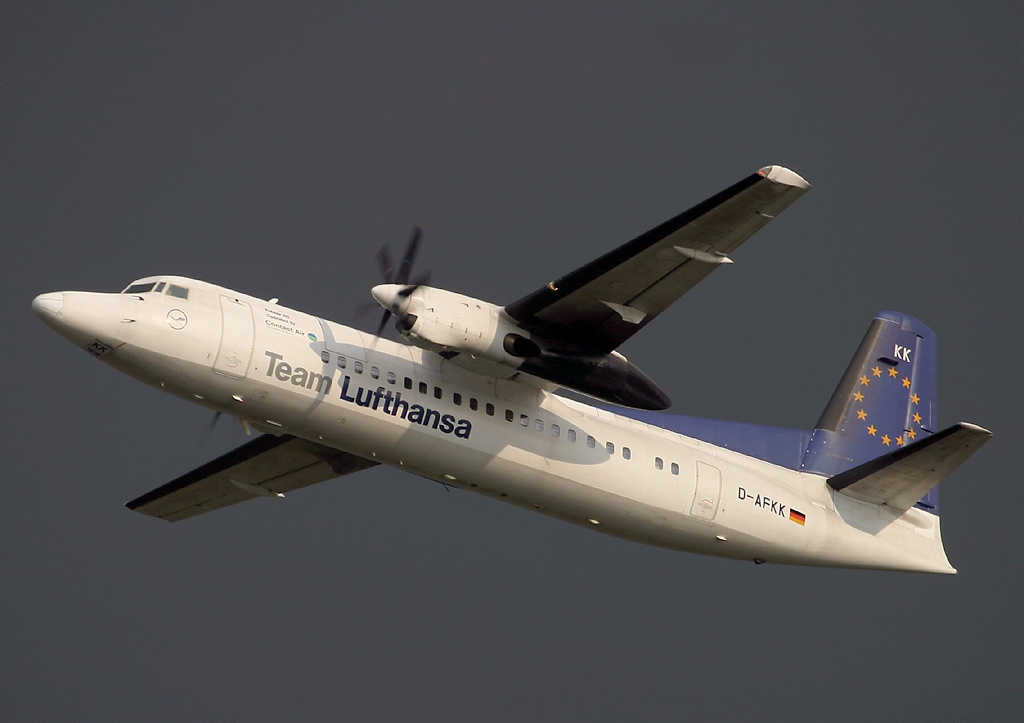
Team Lufthansa Fokker 50

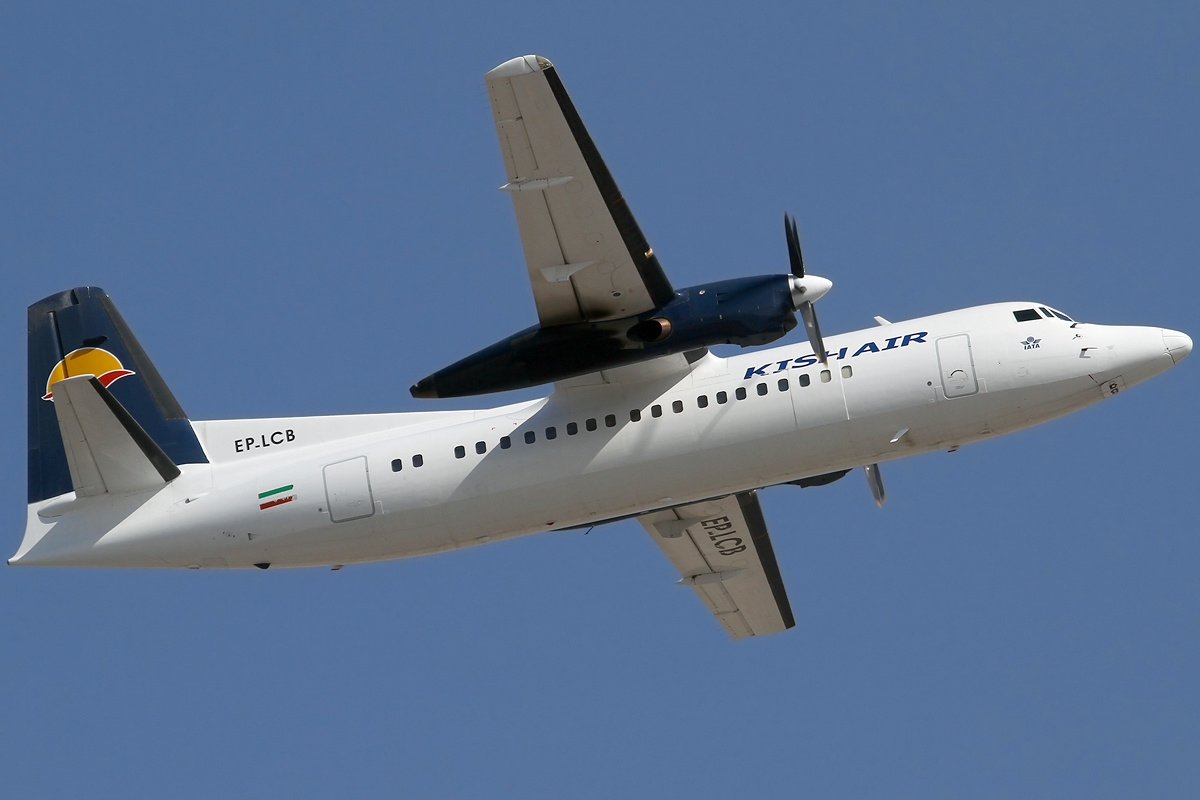
Kish Air Fokker 50

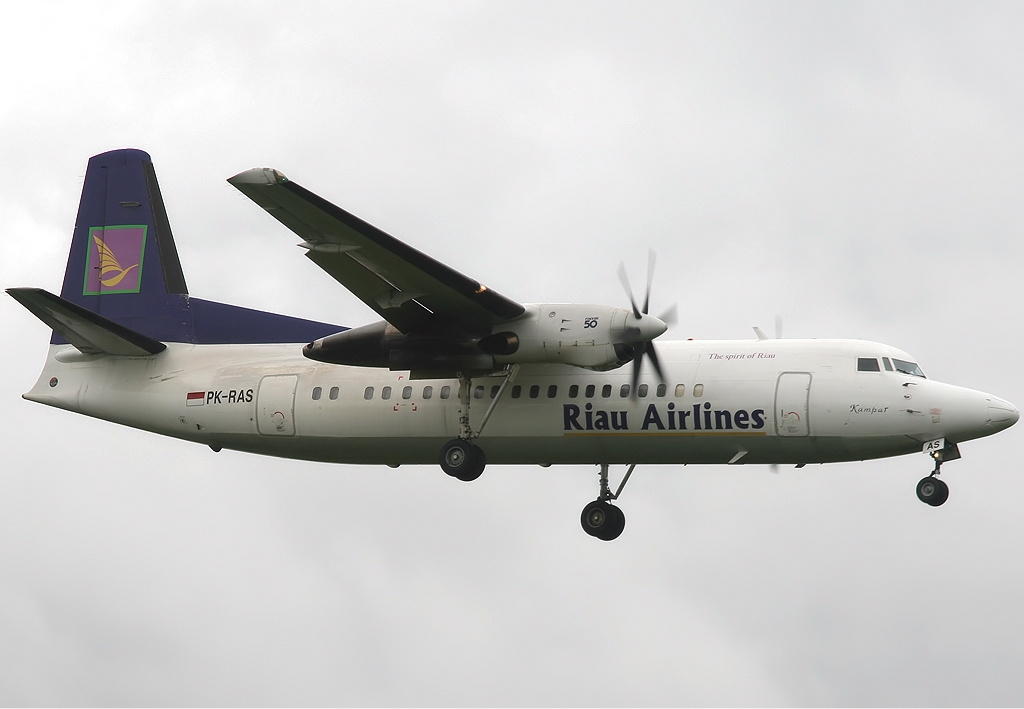
Riau Airlines Fokker 50

Australia

- Alliance Airlines

Indonesia

- Indonesian National Police
- Asia Link Airlines
- Sky Aviation
- TransNusa

Palestine

- Palestinian Airlines

== Accidents and incidents ==
=== Accidents with fatalities ===
- On 15 September 1995, Malaysia Airlines Flight 2133, a Fokker 50 (9M-MGH) crashed during approach in Tawau, Sabah due to pilot error, killing 34 of 53 passengers and crew on board and injuring 10 on ground in the first hull loss of a Fokker 50.
- On 6 November 2002, Luxair Flight 9642, a Fokker 50 aircraft en route to Luxembourg – Findel Airport crashed and burned on final approach to the airport about six nautical miles (11 km) short of the runway while trying to land in the fog. 20 out of 22 passengers and crew were killed.
- On 10 February 2004, Kish Air Flight 7170, a Fokker 50 crashed on approach to Sharjah International Airport, United Arab Emirates after both propellers reversed while causing a loss of control. All six crew and 37 of the 40 passengers on board were killed.
- On 3 March 2013, a Compagnie Africaine d'Aviation Fokker 50 registration 9Q-CBD crashed in poor weather while on approach to Goma International Airport in Goma, Democratic Republic of the Congo, killing all six crew including Russian citizen, Alexander Bazhenov. There were three survivors.
- On 2 July 2014, a Skyward International Aviation Fokker 50 registration 5Y-CET operating a cargo flight ferrying Khat and bound for Mogadishu, Somalia crashed into Embakasi suburbs after taking-off from Jomo Kenyatta International Airport in Nairobi, Kenya. All four crew members died and the hull disintegrated and burnt partially on impact with a highrise structure.

=== Other incidents ===
- On 17 January 2003, an Air Nostrum Fokker 50, operating for Iberia, overran the runway and broke apart at Melilla Airport. Nine people were injured but there were no fatalities.
- On 18 July 2022, a Fokker 50 registration 5Y-JXN operated by Jubba Airways, crashes on landing at Aden Adde International Airport in Somalia coming to a stop upside down at the beginning of the runway. All 36 passengers and crew safely evacuated the aircraft.
- On 5 May 2024, a Fokker 50 registration D6-AIB operated by R Komor crashed at Mohéli airport at take-off.
- On 16 May 2025, a Fokker 50 registration HP-1899PST operated by Air Panama veered off the runway while landing at Bocas Del Toro "Isla Colón" International Airport. All 35 passengers and three crew members safely evacuated with no serious injuries.
- On 10 February 2026, a Fokker 50 of StarSky Aviation, registration 6O-YAS veered off the runway on landing at Mogadishu Airport following technical difficulties. All 55 passengers and crew were unhurt.

== Specifications ==
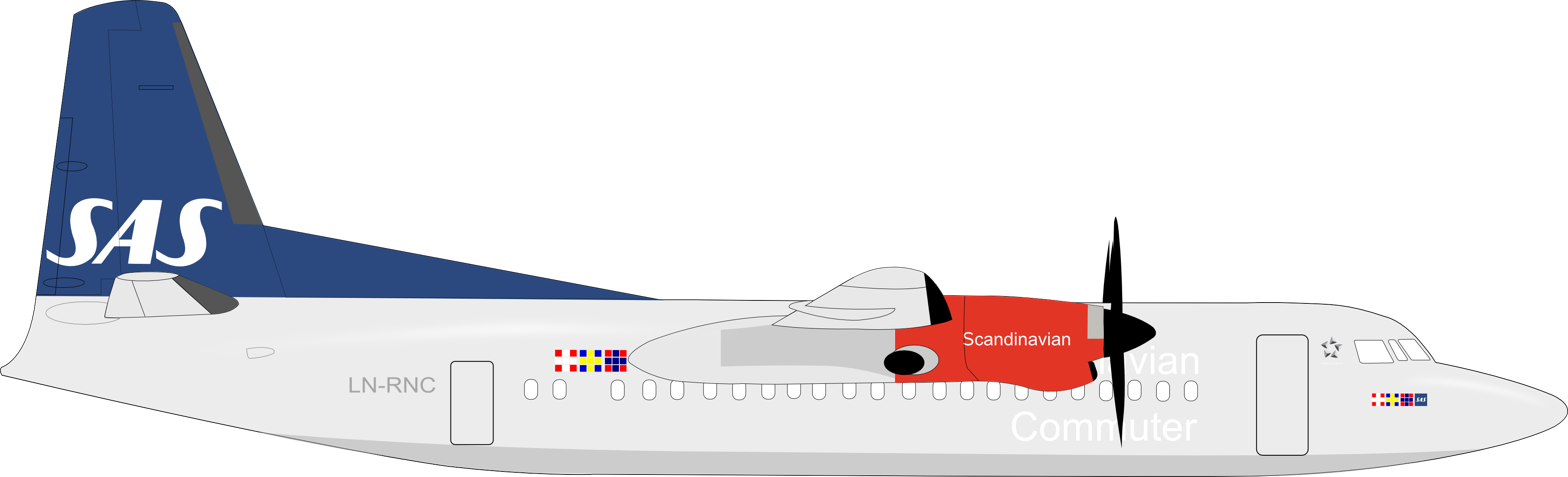
Side view

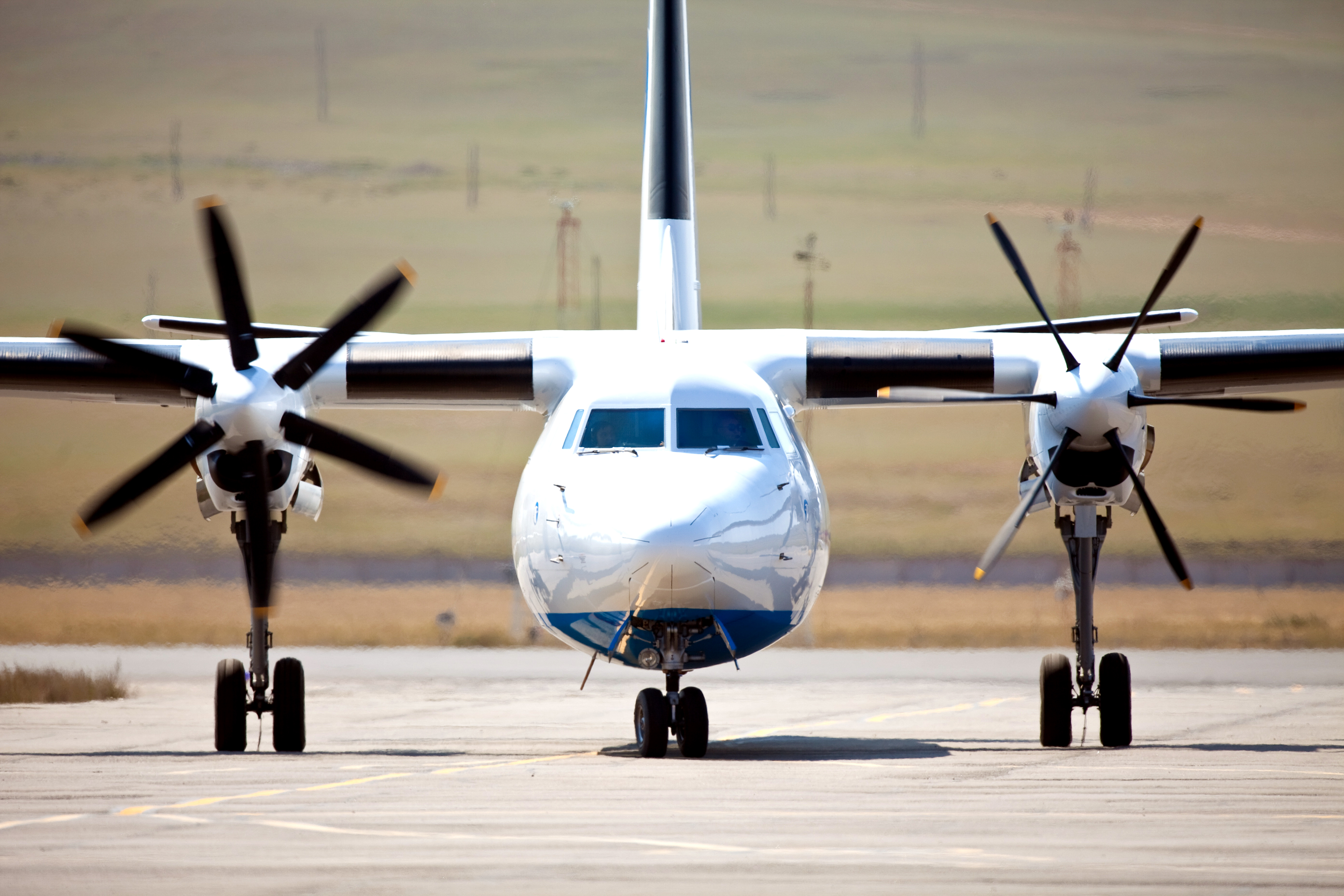
Head-on view of a Fokker 50

Data from Fokker Services, Performance: Fokker Services

General characteristics

- Crew: 2 flight crew
- Capacity: 46 seats at 34" pitch to 56 seats at 30" pitch, 5,500 kg (12,100 lb) max payload
- Length: 25.25 m (82 ft 10 in)
- Wingspan: 29 m (95 ft 2 in)
- Height: 8.32 m (27 ft 4 in)
- Wing area: 70 m^{2} (750 sq ft)
- Aspect ratio: 12.01
- Empty weight: 13,400 kg (29,542 lb)
- Max takeoff weight: 20,820 kg (45,900 lb)
- Fuel capacity: 4,120 kg (9,080 lb)
- Fuselage width: 2.70 m (8.9 ft)
- Cabin Width: 2.50 m (98 in)
- Powerplant: 2 × Pratt & Whitney Canada PW125B turboprop engines, 1,864 kW (2,500 hp) each
- Propellers: six-bladed Dowty Rotol composite propellers, 3.66 m (12 ft 0 in) diameter

Performance

- Maximum speed: 565 km/h (351 mph, 305 kn)
- Maximum speed: Mach 0.507
- Cruise speed: 500 km/h (310 mph, 270 kn)
- Range: 1,700 km (1,000 mi, 900 nmi)
- Service ceiling: 7,620 m (25,000 ft)
- Wing loading: 297.4 kg/m^{2} (60.9 lb/sq ft)
- Takeoff: 1,350 m (4,430 ft) - ISA, SL, MTOW
- Landing: 1,130 m (3,710 ft) - ISA, SL, MLW

== See also ==
Related development

- Fokker F27
- Fairchild Hiller FH-227

Aircraft of comparable role, configuration, and era

- Antonov An-140
- ATR 42 and 72
- CASA CN-235 and EADS CASA C-295
- de Havilland Canada Dash 8 Series 300
- Embraer EMB 120 Brasilia
- Fairchild-Dornier 328 family
- Ilyushin Il-114
- Saab 2000 and 340
- Xian MA60/Xian Y-7/Antonov An-24

== Sources ==
- Eriksson, Sören and Harm-Jan Steenhuis. The Global Commercial Aviation Industry. Routledge, 2015. ISBN 1-13667-239-7.
- European Aviation Safety Agency Type-Certificate Data Sheet - Fokker F27 (TCDS A.036 Issue 2 20 May 2005)
