= L'Oiseau bleu (song) =

Single by Mami Kawada
- B-side: "Kaze to Kimi wo Daite -I'VE in BUDOKAN 2009 Live ver.-"
- Released: June 24, 2009
- Genre: J-Pop
- Length: 15:39
- Label: Geneon
- Songwriter: Mami Kawada
- Producer: I've Sound

Mami Kawada singles chronology
"masterpiece" (2009)	"L'Oiseau bleu" (2009)	"Prophecy" (2009)

"L'Oiseau bleu" is a maxi single released by the J-pop singer, Mami Kawada. This was scheduled to be released on June 24, 2009. This is Kawada's first single that has no anime tie-in and also to the first be produced by I've Sound producer C.G mix. This single has also been contained in the I've Sound 10th Anniversary 「Departed to the future」 Special CD BOX which was released on March 25, 2009.

The coupling song "Kaze to Kimi o Daite (I've in Budokan 2009 Live Ver.)" (風と君を抱いて) is the live version of her first visual novel theme song with I've Sound that she performed in their concert in Budokan last January 2, 2009.

The single only came in a limited CD+DVD edition (GNCV-0017). The DVD will contain the Promotional Video for L'Oiseau bleu.

The single reached number 113 on Oricon's singles charts selling 707 copies.

== Tracklisting ==
1. L'Oiseau bleu—5:38
  Lyrics: Mami Kawada
  Composition/Arrangement: C.G mix
2. Kaze to Kimi o Daite -I'VE in BUDOKAN 2009 Live ver.- (風と君を抱いて)—4:26
  Lyrics: KOTOKO
  Composition/Arrangement: Kazuya Takase
3. L'Oiseau bleu (instrumental) -- 5:35
