= USS Bluebird =

USS Bluebird or USS Blue Bird has been the name of more than one United States Navy ship, and may refer to:

- USS Blue Bird (SP-465), a patrol vessel in commission from 1917 to 1919
- USS Bluebird (AM-72), a minesweeper in commission from 1940 to 1945
- USS Bluebird (ASR-19), a submarine rescue ship in commission from 1946 to 1950
- USS Bluebird (AMS-121), a minesweeper in commission from 1953 to 1968 and in non-commissioned service as a training ship from 1968 to 1971
