= Bluebird Creek =

Stream in Buena Vista and Clay County, Iowa, U.S.

Coordinates: 42.896366°N 95.238608°W

Bluebird Creek is a stream in Buena Vista and Clay counties, Iowa, United States. It is a tributary of the Little Sioux River.

The name of Bluebird Creek was submitted by local second graders as the winning entry in a naming contest.

== See also ==
- List of rivers of Iowa
