= Robert Lucas Pearsall =

English composer (1795–1856)

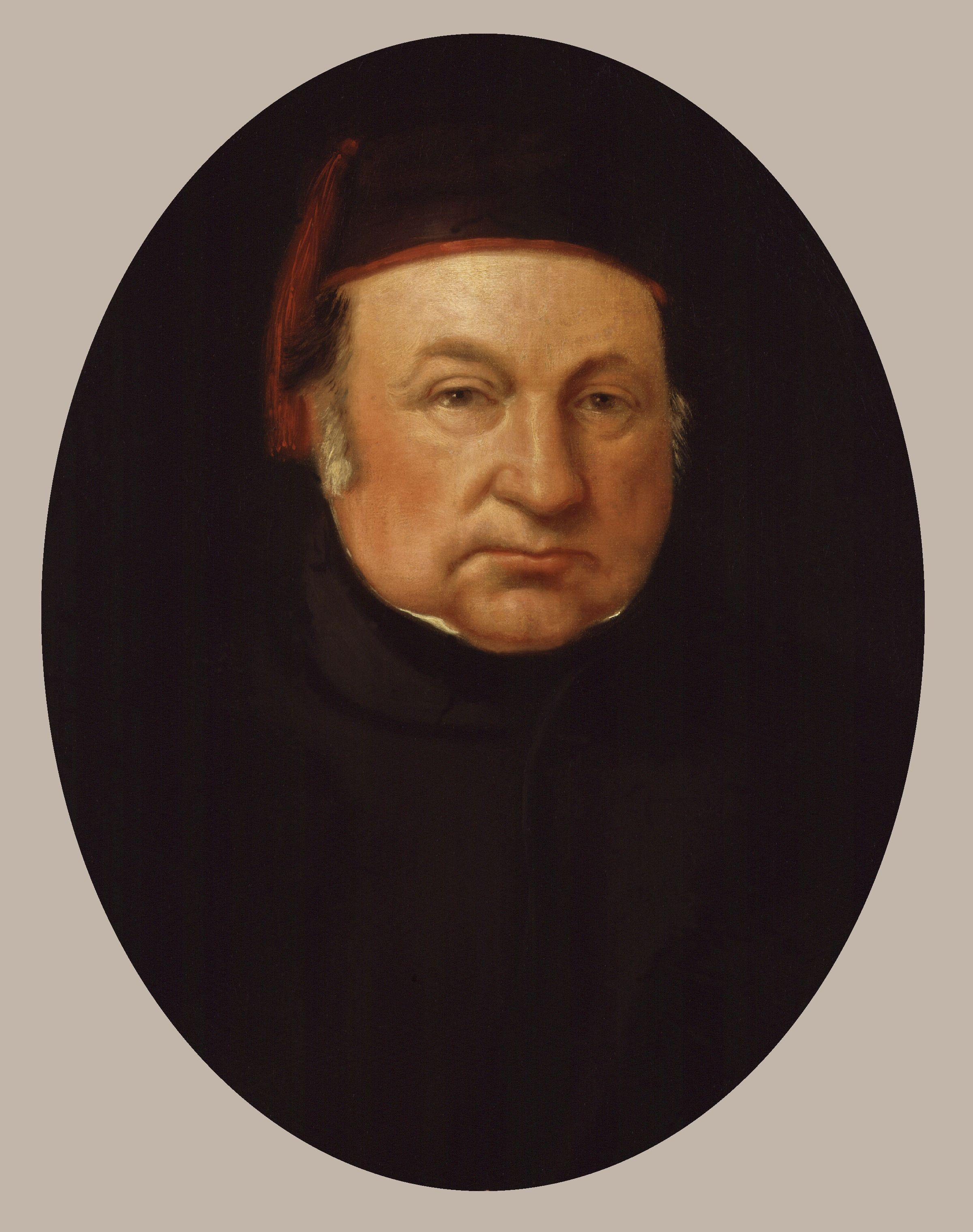
Robert Lucas Pearsall by Philippa Swinnerton Hughes (née Pearsall)

Robert Lucas Pearsall (14 March 1795 – 5 August 1856) was an English composer mainly of vocal music, including an elaborate setting of "In dulci jubilo" and the richly harmonic part song Lay a garland of 1840, both still often performed today. He spent the last 31 years of his life abroad, at first in Germany, then at a castle he bought in Switzerland.

== Biography ==
Pearsall was born at Clifton in Bristol on 14 March 1795 into a wealthy, originally Quaker family. His father, Richard Pearsall (died 1813), was an army officer and an amateur musician. Pearsall was privately educated.

In 1816 Pearsall's mother, Elizabeth (née Lucas), bought the Pearsall family's home at Willsbridge, Gloucestershire, from her brother-in-law, Thomas Pearsall. Thomas had been ruined by the failure of the iron mill that had been the family's business since 1712. After the death of his mother in 1837, Pearsall sold Willsbridge House again, but although he would never live there again, he regularly chose to be known in publications as 'Pearsall of Willsbridge'. As for Willsbridge Mill, it was later converted into a flour mill and it stands to this day.

Pearsall married Harriet Eliza Hobday in 1817. She was the daughter of a moderately successful portrait painter, William Armfield Hobday (1771–1831).

The couple had four children — two boys (although the first son died in infancy) and two girls — all of them born in Bristol. In their early years of marriage, Pearsall practised as a barrister in Bristol, but in 1825 he took his family to live abroad: first to Mainz, then to Karlsruhe (1830–1842). In 1842, evidently after a long period of strain in their relationship, husband and wife separated. Pearsall used the money from the sale of the house at Willsbridge to buy Wartensee Castle, a ruined medieval keep near Rorschach in Switzerland. After purchasing the castle, he spent several years restoring the keep and building a suite of apartments adjacent to it. He remained there until his death on 5 August 1856, and was buried in the vault of the castle chapel. When the chapel was deconsecrated in 1957, his remains were removed and reinterred in the nearby Roman Catholic church at Wilen-Wartegg.

== Composer ==
Pearsall's move abroad brought opportunities to develop his interests as a composer. Although it seems likely that he had some instruction, or at least received advice in composition from the Austrian violinist and composer Joseph Panny, he would still appear to be self-taught when he wrote most of his early attempts. There is little evidence to support a claim made by Hubert Hunt that his early works included the Duetto buffo di due gatti, published under the pseudonym G. Berthold and often attributed to Rossini. Though resident abroad, he kept in touch with his home city of Bristol. Pearsall's last visit to Willsbridge in 1836–1837 coincided with the foundation and earliest meetings of the Bristol Madrigal Society, for which many of the madrigals and part songs he wrote in the period 1836–1841 were composed. The success of his earliest works for the society encouraged him to write others, including "The Hardy Norseman" and "Sir Patrick Spens" (in ten parts), and eight-part settings of "Great God of Love" and "Lay a garland".

Pearsall's setting of the medieval German Christmas carol "In dulci jubilo" (in his original version for eight solo and five chorus parts), is one of his most popular works and still performed frequently at Christmas. A 2008 survey by BBC Music Magazine found Pearsall's setting to be the second most popular choral Christmas carol with British cathedral organists and choirmasters. The carol was originally written as a mixture of Latin and German text, and Pearsall, a scholar of German literature, replaced the German sections with English words to rhyme with the Latin phrases. His original text phrasing reflected the pronunciation of English Vernacular Latin prevalent at the time — thus Pearsall rhymed "O Jesu parvule" with "My Heart is sore for Thee" – but in later versions these phrases have been replaced by "I yearn for Thee alway", reflecting a shift in pronunciation to a more Italianate style of Latin speech. Pearsall's arrangement of "In dulci jubilo" was included by Sir David Willcocks and Reginald Jacques in their popular 1961 music-score collection Carols for Choirs.

Pearsall was an amateur composer. Many of his compositions were not published until after his death, and even now, many remain in manuscript. The particle de before his name was propagated by his daughter Philippa.

Pearsall was the author of several articles and letters that contributed to scholarly understanding of early music in the Roman Catholic and Anglican traditions and helped to re-establish plainsong, Renaissance polyphony, and ancient church hymns in German and English-speaking countries. His antiquarian interests, including history, heraldry and genealogy, his rejection of industrialisation, and his search for clarity in musical composition were derived from earlier models and place him firmly in the Romantic movement. He also composed poetry, some of which he used for his madrigals, such as "Why Do the Roses" (1842). In the 1830s, he made accomplished verse translations into English of Schiller's play William Tell in 1829 and Goethe's Faust.

== Present appreciation ==
The composer Robert Cummings writes, "While Robert Lucas Pearsall wrote instrumental and orchestral music, he is best known for his vocal works, particularly for his madrigals and part songs, which he composed as a means of reviving Renaissance-era styles. He expanded on, rather than copied them, adding structural features from the Classical period to forge a unique pastiche style. This yielded several masterly works, including the madrigals "Great God of Love" and "Lay a Garland"."
