= Mary Coleridge =

British writer (1861–1907)

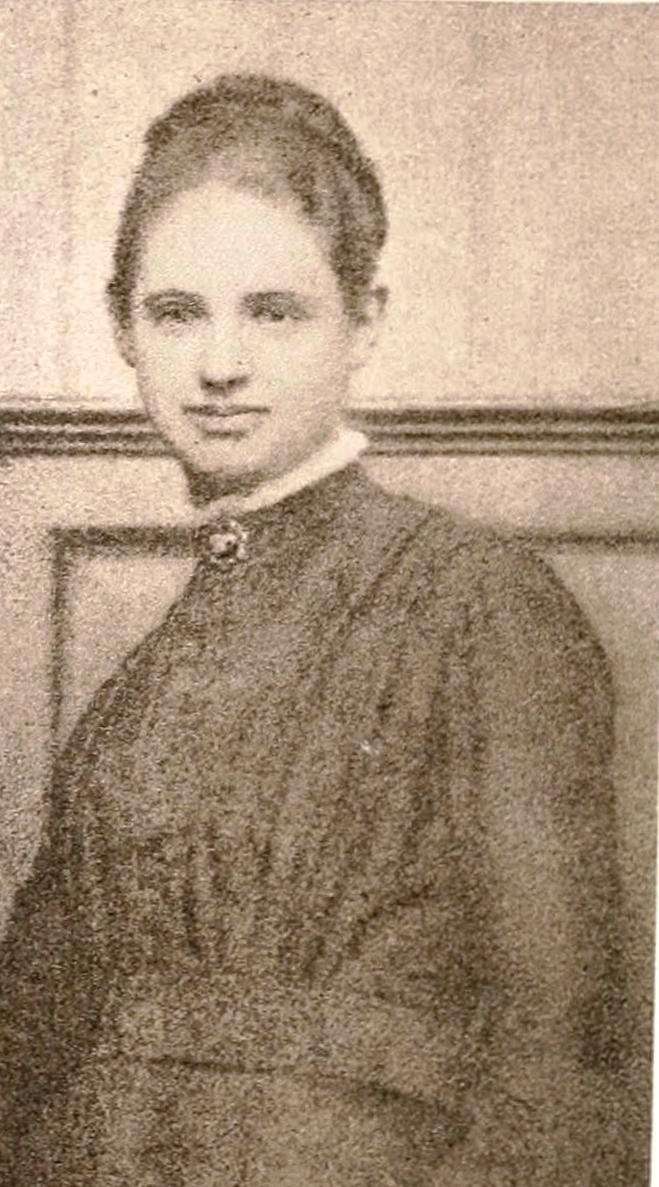
Mary Coleridge in 1883

Mary Coleridge (23 September 1861 – 25 August 1907) was a British novelist and poet who also wrote essays and reviews. She wrote poetry under the pseudonym Anodos (a name taken from George MacDonald). Other influences on her were Richard Watson Dixon and Christina Rossetti. Robert Bridges, the Poet Laureate, described her poems as 'wondrously beautiful… but mystical rather than enigmatical'.

== Biography ==
Mary Elizabeth Coleridge was born in Hyde Park Square, London, the daughter of Arthur Duke Coleridge, who was a lawyer and influential amateur musician. With the singer Jenny Lind, her father was responsible for the formation of the London Bach Choir in 1875. Other family friends included Robert Browning, Alfred, Lord Tennyson, John Millais and Fanny Kemble. She was the great-grandniece of Samuel Taylor Coleridge and the great niece of Sara Coleridge, the author of Phantasmion.

Coleridge was educated at home, mostly by the poet and educationalist W. J. Cory, and began writing poetry as a child. She travelled widely throughout her life, although her home was in London, where she lived with her family. She taught at the London Working Women's College for twelve years from 1895 to 1907.

She completed five novels. Her first was The Seven Sleepers of Ephesus, published in February 1893 by Chatto & Windus. The story (which is unrelated to the Seven Sleepers of Ephesus legend) centres on a mysterious "Brotherhood" involved in the production of a play in a nineteenth-century German town. It received mixed reviews. The novel was credited only to "M. E. Coleridge", which led at least one newspaper to assume that the author was a man.

Edward Arnold published the other four novels. The best known is The King with Two Faces, which earned her £900 in royalties in 1897, running through six editions in its first year. The subject is the French Revolution and the assassination of Gustavus III of Sweden in 1792.

Coleridge died of complications arising from appendicitis while on holiday in Harrogate in 1907, leaving an unfinished manuscript for her next novel and hundreds of unpublished poems. Her poetry was first published under her own name in the posthumous Poems (1908). It proved very popular, with four reprints within six months of first publication. In the preface to this volume, Henry Newbolt wrote:

As a poetess, Mary Coleridge never came before the public under her own name; her printed verse was always either anonymous or signed with the pseudonym ’Άνοδος — a name taken from George Macdonald's romance, "Phantastes," where it is evidently intended to bear the meaning of "Wanderer." Probably several reasons or feelings prompted this concealment; the one by which my own arguments were always met was the fear of tarnishing the name which an ancestor had made illustrious in English poetry [...] I believe that no poems are less likely than these to jar upon lovers of "Christabel" and "The Ancient Mariner."

In 1954 interest was revived by the first comprehensive Collected Poems to be issued, edited by Rupert Hart-Davis and with an introduction by Theresa Whistler. More recently, her work has been further re-assessed and included in anthologies of fin de siècle Victorian women's poetry by Angela Leighton and Margaret Reynolds, and Isobel Armstrong and Joseph Bristow. Heather Braun contributed a substantial introduction to a reprint of her final published novel, The Lady on the Drawingroom Floor (with selected poetry and prose) in 2018.

== Musical settings ==
The relative simplicity of Mary Coleridge's lyrical poetry, combined with its touch of mysticism and strong imagery, proved congenial to composers. Both Hubert Parry and Charles Villiers Stanford were friends of Mary's father, and frequent visitors to the family home at 12, Cromwell Place, South Kensington. Parry set seven of her poems as songs for voice and piano in his English Lyrics, Ninth Set, published in 1909. In the opinion of Trevor Hold, "no-one set her more sympathetically than Parry". Stanford composed two sets of eight choral partsongs, Op. 119 and Op. 127 (both 1910). By far the best known of these (and of any Coleridge setting) is "The Blue Bird", from Mary's poem originally published in 1897 under the French title "L'Oiseau Bleu".

Other settings include several by John Ireland and Roger Quilter, three poems (including "Thy Hand in Mine") by Frank Bridge, and the Four Dramatic Songs, Op. 44 for solo voice and orchestra by Cyril Rootham (1913 - later also arranged for voice and piano). William Busch set "L'Oiseau Bleu" in a German translation as "Der blaue Vogel" (1944).

== Published works ==
- Coleridge, M. E. (1893). The Seven Sleepers of Ephesus. London: Chatto & Windus. OCLC 39559680.
- Anodos (1896). Fancy's Following. Oxford: C. H. Daniel. OCLC 2407580.
  - Collection of poems. Republished as Anodos (1900). Fancy's Following. Portland, ME: Thomas B Mosher. hdl:2027/uc1.31822038204566.
- Anodos (1897). Fancy's Guerdon. London: Elkin Mathews.
  - Collection of poems, including eleven repeated from Fancy's Following.
- Coleridge, M. E. (1897). The King with Two Faces. London: Edward Arnold.
- Anodos (1899), "[Poems]", The Garland of New Poetry by Various Writers, London: Elkin Mathews, pp. 21–36
- Coleridge, M. E. (1900). Non Sequitur. London: James Nisbet.
  - Collection of brief essays.
- Coleridge, M. E. (1901). The Fiery Dawn. London: Edward Arnold.
- Coleridge, M. E. (1904). The Shadow on the Wall: a Romance. London: Edward Arnold. hdl:2027/mdp.39015047651032.
- Coleridge, M. E. (1906). The Lady on the Drawingroom Floor. London: Edward Arnold.
- Coleridge, Mary E. (1908). Poems. London: Elkin Mathews.
  - Posthumous, with an introduction by Henry Newbolt.
- Coleridge, Mary E. (n.d.) [1908]. Holman Hunt. London: T. C. & E. C. Jack.
  - Posthumous study of the eponymous artist.
- The Collected Poems of Mary Coleridge, ed. Theresa Whistler. London: Rupert Hart-Davis, 1954
- The Lady on the Drawingroom Floor with Selected Poetry and Prose, ed. Heather Braun. Vancouver: Fairleigh Dickinson University Press, 2018.
