= Bluebird (Dawn Landes album) =

Studio album by Dawn Landes
- Released: February 18, 2014
- Length: 33:25
- Label: Western Vinyl

Dawn Landes chronology
Sweetheart Rodeo (2010)	Bluebird (2014)	Meet Me at the River (2018)

Professional ratings
Aggregate scores
Source	Rating
Metacritic	75/100
Review scores
Source	Rating
AllMusic	4/5 stars
Blurt	2/5 stars
The Line of Best Fit	7/10
NME	3/5 stars
The Skinny	4/5 stars

Bluebird is the fourth studio album by American musician Dawn Landes. It was released on February 18, 2014 on Western Vinyl.

== Critical reception ==
Bluebird was met with generally favorable reviews from critics. At Metacritic, which assigns a weighted average rating out of 100 to reviews from mainstream publications, this release received an average score of 75, based on 7 reviews.

== Track listing ==
All tracks are written by Dawn Landes.

Bluebird track listing
No.	Title	Length
1.	"Bluebird"	3:51
2.	"Try to Make a Fire Burn Again"	3:02
3.	"Bloodhound"	3:08
4.	"Heel Toe"	3:32
5.	"Cry No More"	3:33
6.	"Oh Brother"	2:57
7.	"Diamond Rivers"	2:28
8.	"Love Song"	4:15
9.	"Lullaby for Tony"	3:43
10.	"Home"	2:56
