= Blue Bird (Russian folk song) =

Russian folk song

"Blue Bird" (синяя птица; sinyaya ptitsa) is a Russian folk song.

The song begins:

Жила на свете птица синяя,..
Zhila na svete ptitsa sinyaya,..
There lived in the world a blue bird,..
