= Lay a garland =

Poem

"Lay a garland" is a popular English poem from the play The Maid's Tragedy (Act II, Scene I) written in 1608-11. The poem was famously set to music by Robert Lucas de Pearsall on 4 June 1840, scored for SSAATTBB in Eb. In 1854, Pearsall produced a contrafactum of Lay a Garland, to the Latin text Tu es Petrus, dedicating it to the first bishop of St Gallen, John Peter. This is more often performed by choirs in a liturgical setting, as the original words for the music are more appropriate to a secular occasion.

== Lyrics ==
The song is sung by Aspasia where her betrothed is forced into a marriage of convenience to the king's mistress. The original words are as follows:

Lay a garland on my hearse
of the^{[I]} dismal yew.
Maidens, willow branches wear,
say I died true.
My love was false, but I was firm
from my hour of birth.^{[II]}
Upon my buried body lie
lightly, gentle earth.

However Pearsall's music is set to these adapted words changed from first to third person

Lay a garland on her hearse
of dismal yew.
Maidens, willow branches wear,
say she died true.
Her love was false, but she was firm.
Upon her buried body lie
lightly, thou^{[II]} gentle earth.

I : These words were present in the original poem by Beaumont and Fletcher but omitted in the composition
II : Word was added into the composition.
