= Blue Bird Aviation =

Kenyan airline

IATA	ICAO	Call sign
-	BLB	BLUEBIRD SUDAN
- Founded: 1989
- Fleet size: 4
- Website: https://bluebirdsudan.com

Blue Bird Aviation is a charter airline based in Khartoum, Sudan. It operates fixed-wing charter services as well as VIP, corporate shuttle, ground handling and aircraft maintenance services. Its main base is Khartoum International Airport. It is currently banned from flying into the EU airspace.

== Fleet ==
As of June 2020, the Blue Bird Aviation fleet consists of the following aircraft:

Blue Bird Aviation fleet
Aircraft	In Service	Orders	Passengers	Notes
CRJ-100LR	2	—		
Fokker 50	1	—		
DHC-6-300 Twin Otter	1	—		
Total	4			
