= Blue Bird (Korean folk song) =

"Blue Bird" (파랑새 parang sae or 파랑새요) is a Korean folk song. It originates from the Donghak Peasant Revolution.

The song begins:

"Blue bird, blue bird, lovely blue bird, Do not sit on green bean ..(새야 새야 파랑새야 녹두밭에 앉지마라)"
