= Taftan Airlines =

Iranian airline

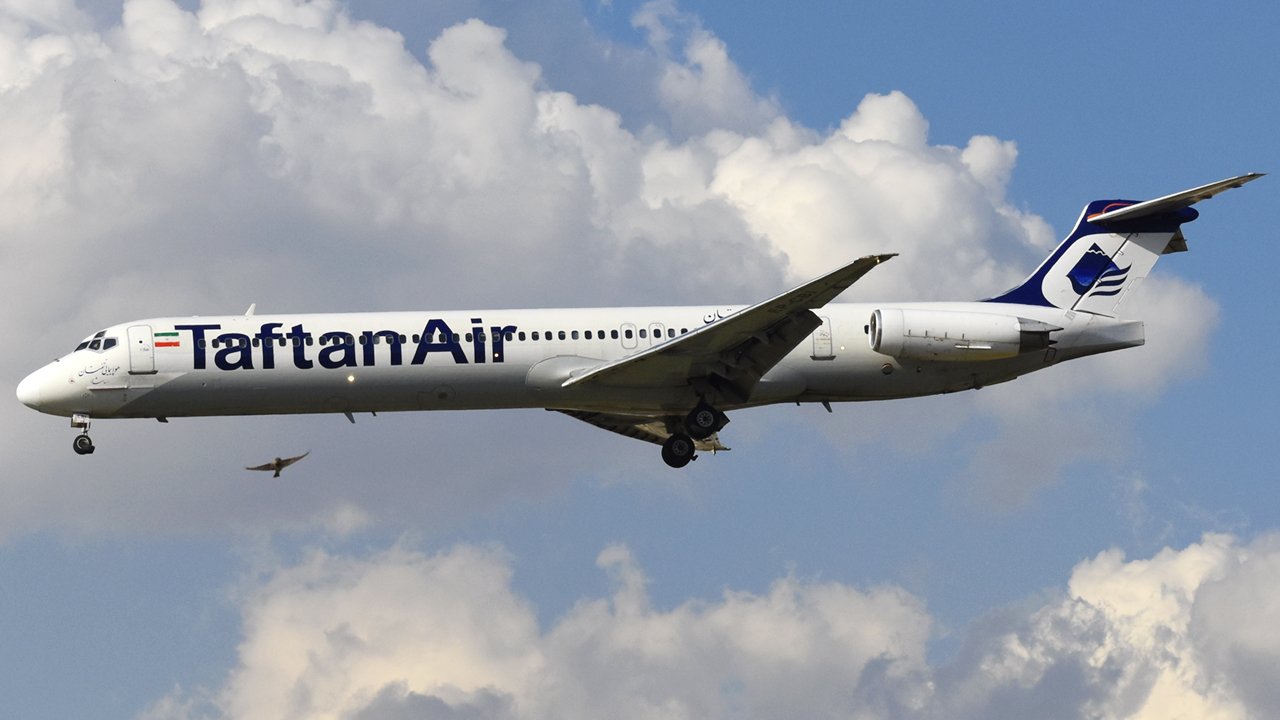
- Taftan Airlines McDonnell Douglas MD-82
IATA	ICAO	Call sign
-	SBT	TAFTAN
- Founded: 2004 (22 years ago)
- Commenced operations: December 2004 (1st launch); 2014 (2nd launch); August 2016 (10 years ago) (3rd launch)
- Ceased operations: 2006 (1st cessation); 2015 (2nd cessation)
- Hubs: Zahedan Airport
- Fleet size: 1
- Headquarters: Tehran, Iran
- Website: www.taftanair.com

Taftan Airlines (Persian: هواپیمایی تفتان, Havâpeymâyi-ye Taftân) was an airline from Iran.

== History ==
The airline was founded in 2004 and commenced operations the same year. It ceased operations in 2006 and launched again in 2014, only to cease operations the next year. For the third time, the airline launched operations in August 2016.

In 2017 a delayed flight operated by Taftan airlines was delayed by 15 minutes, then passengers began doing an Islamic prayer and the captain would end up starting to fly the aircraft without the praying passengers.

The airline has its main hub at the Zahedan Airport. Its fleet comprises six Fokker 50, one MD-82 and one MD-83 aircraft.

== Fleet ==
=== Current fleet ===
As of July 2026, Taftan Airlines operates the following aircraft:

Taftan Airlines current fleet
Aircraft	In fleet	Orders	Capacity	Notes
Fokker 50	1		50	
Total	1		-	

=== Former fleet ===
As of August 2025, Taftan Airlines operated 1 Fokker 50.

Taftan Airlines former fleet
Aircraft	In fleet	Orders	Capacity	Notes
Fokker 50	6		50	
McDonnell Douglas MD-82	1		n/a	
McDonnell Douglas MD-83	1		n/a	
Total	8		-	

== See also ==
- List of airlines of Iran
