= Bluebird Gap =

Gap

Coordinates: 34°43′26.5″N 85°21′6.9″W

Bluebird Gap [elevation: 1,240 feet (380 m)] is a gap in Walker County, in the U.S. state of Georgia.

Bluebird Gap was named for Blue Bird, a local Native American, it is located at 34.7239684, -85.3519025 34° 43' 26.29" N, 85° 21' 6.85" W
