= Blue bird (cocktail) =

Classic cocktail

- Type: Mixed drink
- Ingredients: 4 Dashes Angostura bitters; 3/4 wineglass gin; 5 dashes Orange curacao
- Standard drinkware: Cocktail glass
- Standard garnish: Orange peel
- Preparation: Combine ingredients with ice in cocktail shaker; shake well, then strain into cocktail glass, pouring over ice.

The Blue bird is a gin or vodka cocktail with blue curacao. The Savoy Cocktail Book gives the recipe as gin with Angostura bitters and curacao. Another recipe from the Café Royal Cocktail Book (1937) uses vodka instead of gin, adding maraschino liquor, and fresh lemon juice. The original gin-based cocktail was reimagined by Bill Tarling, who was known for various blue colored cocktails. The earlier recipe used angostura bitters which would have effected the final color of the cocktail, and may be the reason behind Tarling's changes to the original recipe.

The bluebird is shaken with ice and served in a chilled cocktail glass with an orange peel garnish.

== See also ==
- List of cocktails
- Vodka cocktail
