= The Blue Bird (Stanford) =

1910 part song by Charles Villiers Stanford

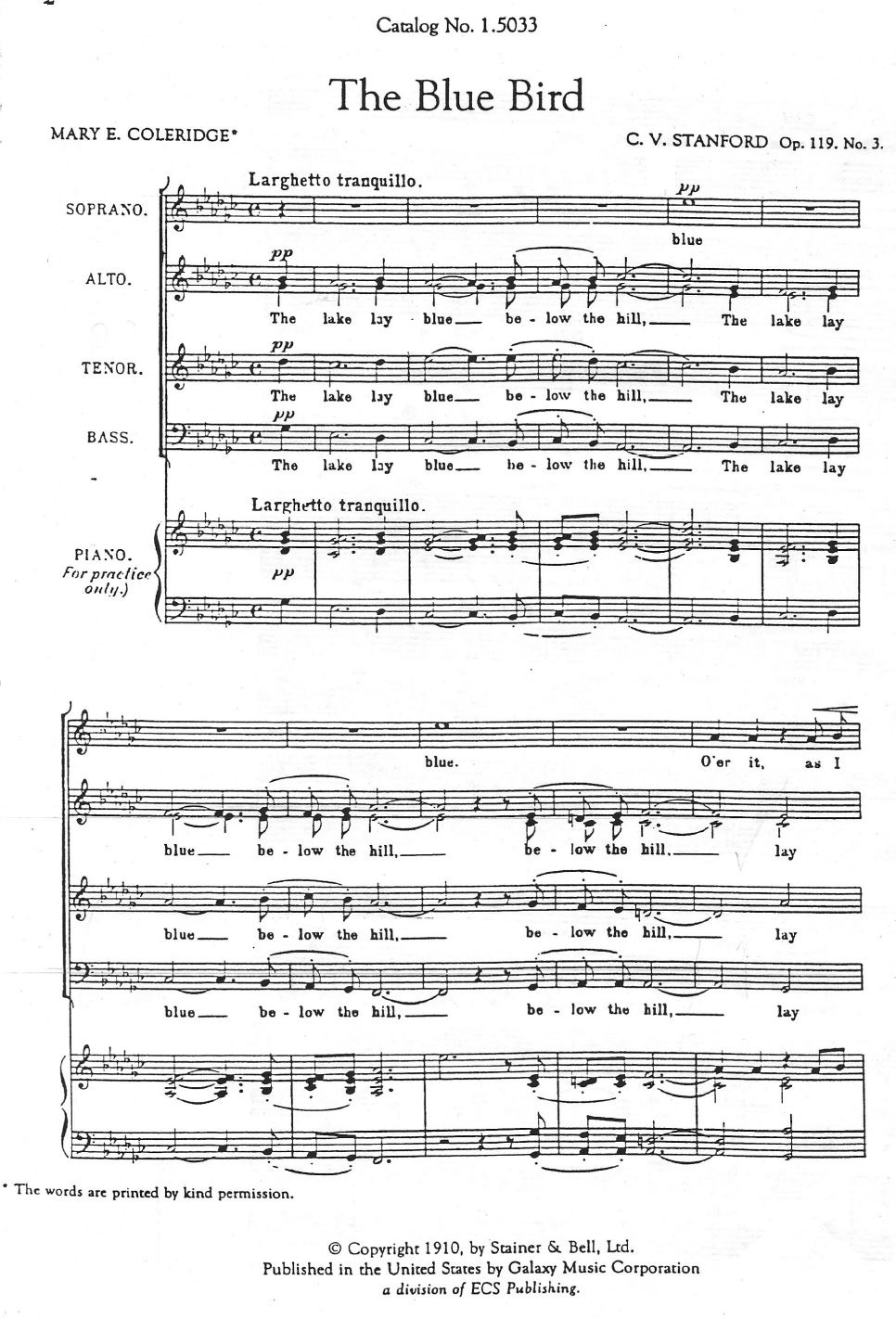
- First page of The Blue Bird
- Opus: 119, No. 3
- Form: Partsong
- Text: poem by Mary Elizabeth Coleridge
- Melody: Charles Villiers Stanford
- Composed: 1910
- Publisher: Stainer & Bell
- Scoring: SAATB

The Blue Bird is a partsong (Op. 119 No. 3) composed by Charles Villiers Stanford in 1910. It is set to the words of L'Oiseau Bleu, a poem by Mary Elizabeth Coleridge, which depicts a blue bird in flight over a lake. It is written for SAATB choir: soprano, divided altos, tenor and bass. "The Blue Bird" is the third of Stanford's Eight Part Songs which are all settings of texts by Coleridge. It was widely performed by choral societies in England during Stanford's life and is considered one of the best English partsongs ever written. It has been recorded by ensembles including The Cambridge Singers, Oxford Camerata, Tenebrae, and the Gabrieli Consort.

== Context ==
Before composing "The Blue Bird", Charles Villiers Stanford had already established himself as an accomplished writer of partsongs. He began by writing three collections of them in an Elizabethan style, the first of which (Op. 47, 1892) was praised by the Musical Times as being among the best of their kind. He then turned to setting arrangements of Irish folk songs, followed by Op. 119 and Op. 127, published by Stainer & Bell, which are settings of poetry by Mary Elizabeth Coleridge, whose father Arthur Duke Coleridge was a friend of Stanford's. "The Blue Bird" comes from the Op. 119 collection of partsongs and is one of Stanford's most famous examples of the form. The form first became influential in England when partsongs by Felix Mendelssohn were translated into English, and the genre grew in part due to the popularity of early 19th century choral societies.

== Song ==
=== Music and verse form ===
Partsongs are often strophic and written for multiple voices in a homophonic texture, with occasional rhythmic variation between the upper and lower voices. They are intended to be sung in intimate settings. "The Blue Bird" is in the key of G♭ major and is scored for an SAATB ensemble (although the soprano line is often sung as a solo with the soprano and alto in the choir singing the first and second alto lines respectively). A typical performance lasts around four minutes, varying for each conductor.

The piece is strophic with two stanzas which have similar harmonic treatment. The first four bars are repeated at the end, acting as a short coda. The harmony frequently emphasises secondary sevenths and closely-spaced intervals, such as the major second which features frequently in the piece. The final chord is a seventh based on the supertonic (A♭), while the soprano's final "blue" is suspended. This deliberate absence of resolution creates, in the words of Jeremy Dibble, "an inimitable version of the eternal."

"The Blue Bird" uses harmonic, rhythmic and other elements of the music to depict the imagery of the poem. The soprano part plays an important role in illustrating the blue bird itself. Dibble interprets the wide range of the soprano line as illustrating "the bird's free flight across the lake", and the repeated instances of the word "blue" on an E♭ as the bird "hovering". As for other imagery, Paul Rodmell writes that the slowly-moving nature of the music (larghetto tranquillo, or rather slow) depicts "a perfect picture of a still, hot day". He also compares the nature of the work to Vaughan Williams's The Lark Ascending (1914), a piece for violin and orchestra in which the music also depicts a bird in flight and natural scenery.

=== Text ===
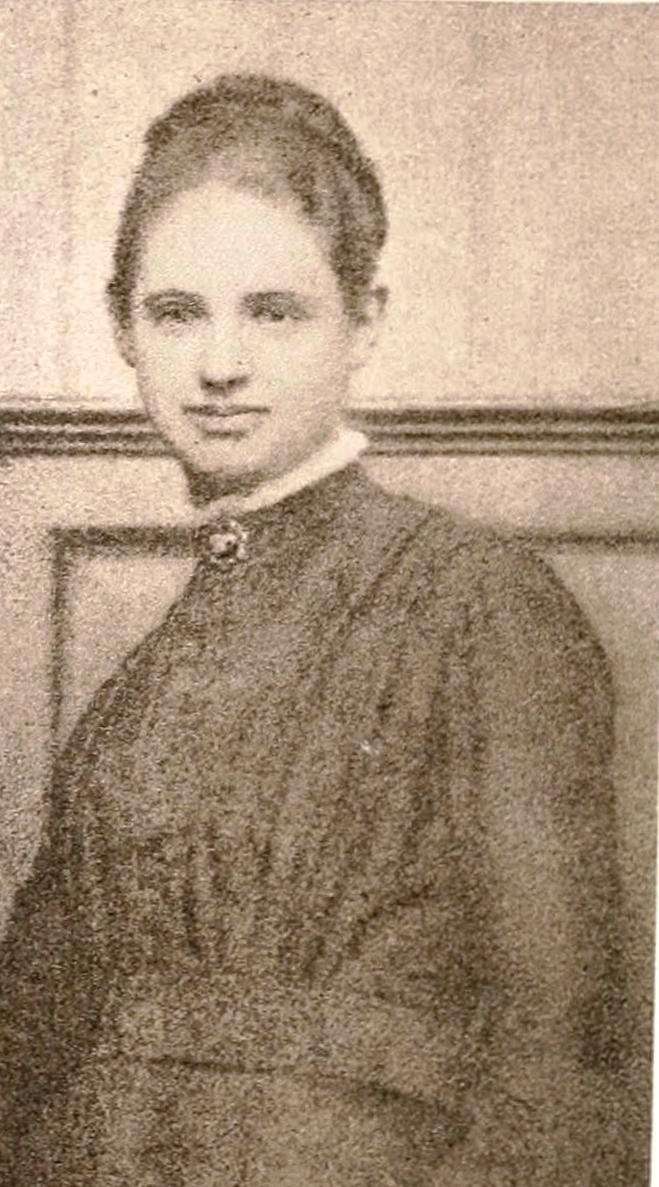
"The Blue Bird" is a setting of text by Mary Elizabeth Coleridge, pictured in 1883.

Coleridge's poem was originally published in 1897 with the French title L'Oiseau Bleu. It was published under the pseudonym "Anodos", which is taken from the novel Phantastes by George MacDonald and can be interpreted to mean "Wanderer". "The Blue Bird" was one of many poems published posthumously under Coleridge's own name in 1908, after she died prematurely the previous year aged 45.

The lake lay blue below the hill.
O'er it, as I looked, there flew
Across the waters, cold and still,
A bird whose wings were palest blue.

The sky above was blue at last,
The sky beneath me blue in blue.
A moment, ere the bird had passed,
It caught his image as he flew.

== Reception and legacy ==
According to musician and writer Walter Bitner, "the poem's great beauty lies in its direct expression of natural beauty and its power to evoke a strong impression in the imagination of the reader ... The poet carefully identifies the subject of the poem as 'I' so that as each of us reads or hears it, we see this image in our mind's eye as if we ourselves are the witness of the event ... It is pure impressionism." In Grove's Dictionary of Music and Musicians, Dibble notes that "The Blue Bird" demonstrates Stanford's expertise in sophisticated and refined diatonic harmonic language along with a "lyrical flair".

Stanford contributed to the repertoire of English choral music in the nineteenth century and the music sung within choral societies. In an address at Stanford's centenary, the composer Herbert Howells remarked how "The Blue Bird" in particular was widely performed among choral societies across the country, and how it formed an "essential beauty in the hearts of unnumbered singers." Musicologist Jeremy Dibble, who specialises in Stanford and his works, describes "The Blue Bird" as "perhaps one of the greatest English part-songs ever written." In his biography of Stanford, musicologist Paul Rodmell compares "The Blue Bird" within the context of Eight Partsongs (Op. 119), remarking that while most of the Eight Partsongs are "inconsequential", "The Blue Bird" stands out as an exception and is "deserving of its renown". Charles Reid, in Choral Music, describes the partsong as "a rounded a perfect miniature", which can be considered one of the best in its field.

Judith Bingham's The Drowned Lovers (setting her own words, after Mary Coleridge) was intended as a partner work for "The Blue Bird", using harmonies derivied from the original. The composer stipulates that Stanford's work should always follow without a break.

== Selected discography ==
The Blue Bird is usually included in an album of part-songs from different composers, or a collection of Stanford's music. The piece is featured in the record There is Sweet Music (Collegium Records COLCD 104, 1986; CSCD 505, 2002), performed by the Cambridge Singers under John Rutter. It is also part of Choral Music - English Madrigals and Songs from Henry VIII to the 20th Century (Naxos 8.553088, 1996) performed by the Oxford Camerata under Jeremy Summerly. This record includes all eight songs of Stanford's Op. 119. Other records which feature The Blue Bird features include: One Day Fine - Choral Music from Ireland (RTÉ Lyric CD131) performed by the National Chamber Choir of Ireland under Paul Hillier; Sir Charles Villiers Stanford (The British Music Collection, Decca 470 384-2, 2006) performed by Choir of New College Oxford; Music of the Spheres. Part Songs of the British Isles (Signum SIGCD904, 2016) performed by Tenebrae under Nigel Short; Silence & Music (Signum SIGCD490, 2017) performed by the Gabrieli Consort under Paul McCreesh; and In Paradisum (Aparté Music AP228, 2020) performed by Schola Cantorum of the Cardinal Vaughan Memorial School.
