= Antonov An-26 =

Soviet turboprop transport aircraft

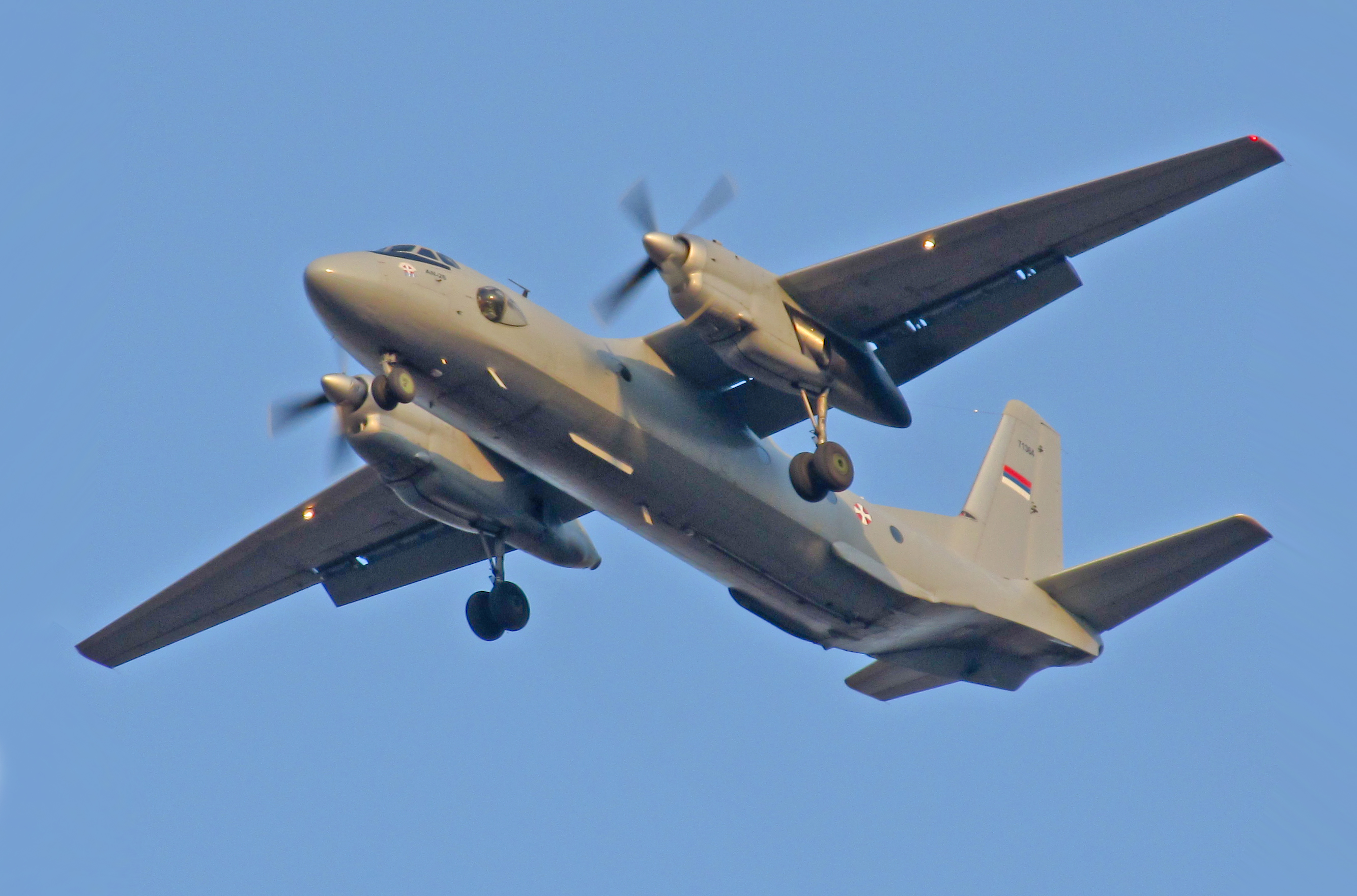
- An-26 of the Serbian Air Force

General information
- Type: Transport aircraft / regional airliner
- National origin: Soviet Union
- Manufacturer: Antonov Serial Production Plant
- Designer: Antonov
- Status: In service
- Primary users: Soviet Air Forces (former) Russian Aerospace Forces; Ukrainian Air Force; People's Liberation Army Air Force
- Number built: 1,403

History
- Manufactured: 1969–present (in China as Y-7)
- Introduction date: 1972
- First flight: 21 May 1969
- Developed from: Antonov An-24
- Developed into: Xi'an Y-7; Antonov An-32

The Antonov An-26 (NATO reporting name: Curl, nicknamed Nastia in the USSR) is a twin-engined turboprop regional airliner and military transport aircraft, designed and produced in the Soviet Union from 1969 to 1986. It is the third member of the Antonov An-24 family, coming after the An-24 and An-30, while preceding the An-32 and cancelled An-132. The An-26 is still license-produced in China as the modern version of the Xi'an Y-7. Early versions of the Y-7 utilized the An-24 design.

== Development ==
While the An-24T tactical transport had proved successful in supporting Soviet troops in austere locations, its ventral loading hatch restricted the handling of cargo, and in particular vehicles, and made it less effective than hoped in parachuting men and supplies. As a result, interest in a version with a retractable cargo ramp increased, and the Antonov design bureau decided in 1966 to begin development on the new An-26 derivative, in advance of an official order. The cargo ramp was based on that design and allowed the cargo deck to be sealed and pressurised in flight. When loading cargo, it could either be lowered to allow vehicles to be driven in, or slid beneath the aircraft's fuselage, so that cargo could be loaded straight in off a truck bed. In March 1968, the OKB received official permission to begin development. Particular attention was given to the military mission, and the majority of early An-26 production was delivered to the VTA (voyenno-transportnaya aviatsiya).

Using the majority of the An-24 airframe, it has high-set cantilevered wings, wing-mounted twin Ivchenko AI-24 turboprops with a turbojet engine in the starboard nacelle for use as an auxiliary power unit and also for extra take-off thrust, plus long main undercarriage legs. The An-26 includes military equipment, such as tip-up paratroop canvas seats, an overhead traveling hoist, bulged observation windows and parachute static line attachment cables. It can be configured in 20–30 minutes from the troop transport or freight mission to the medical evacuation role with up to 24 stretchers fitted.

The An-26 made its public debut at the 27th Paris Air Show at Le Bourget where the second prototype, CCCP-26184 (c/n00202), was shown in the static aircraft park.

The An-26 is also manufactured without a license agreement in China by the Xian Aircraft factory as the Y-14, later changed to be included in the Xi'an Y-7 series.

=== Total production ===
Total production	1986	1985	1984	1983	1982	1981	1980	1979	1978	1977	1976	1975	1974	1973	1972	1971	1970	1969
1,159	1	53	33	54	77	86	125	149	130	103	99	77	62	35	36	21	14	4

== Operational history ==
The An-26 has a secondary bomber role with underwing bomb racks. The racks are attached to the fuselage in front of and behind the rear landing gear. In the bombing role it was extensively used by the Vietnam People's Air Force during the Cambodian–Vietnamese War (by modifying the cargo bay with a bomb release system, allowing captured South Vietnamese Mark 82 bombs to roll out of the cargo bay) and Sudanese Air Force during the Second Sudanese Civil War and the War in Darfur. Russian Forces have also trained with the An-26 as a bomber. In 1977, the Afghan Air Force received the An-26 aircraft and in 1986, they had 36 of them which were used for airborne assaults conducted by the Afghan Army's commando and parachute battalions and two military transport squadrons.

One An-26 was involved in the Purulia Incident in 1995 in which arms were dropped in the Purulia district of West Bengal, India. The reason behind the drop is not disclosed to the public due to national security.

== Variants ==
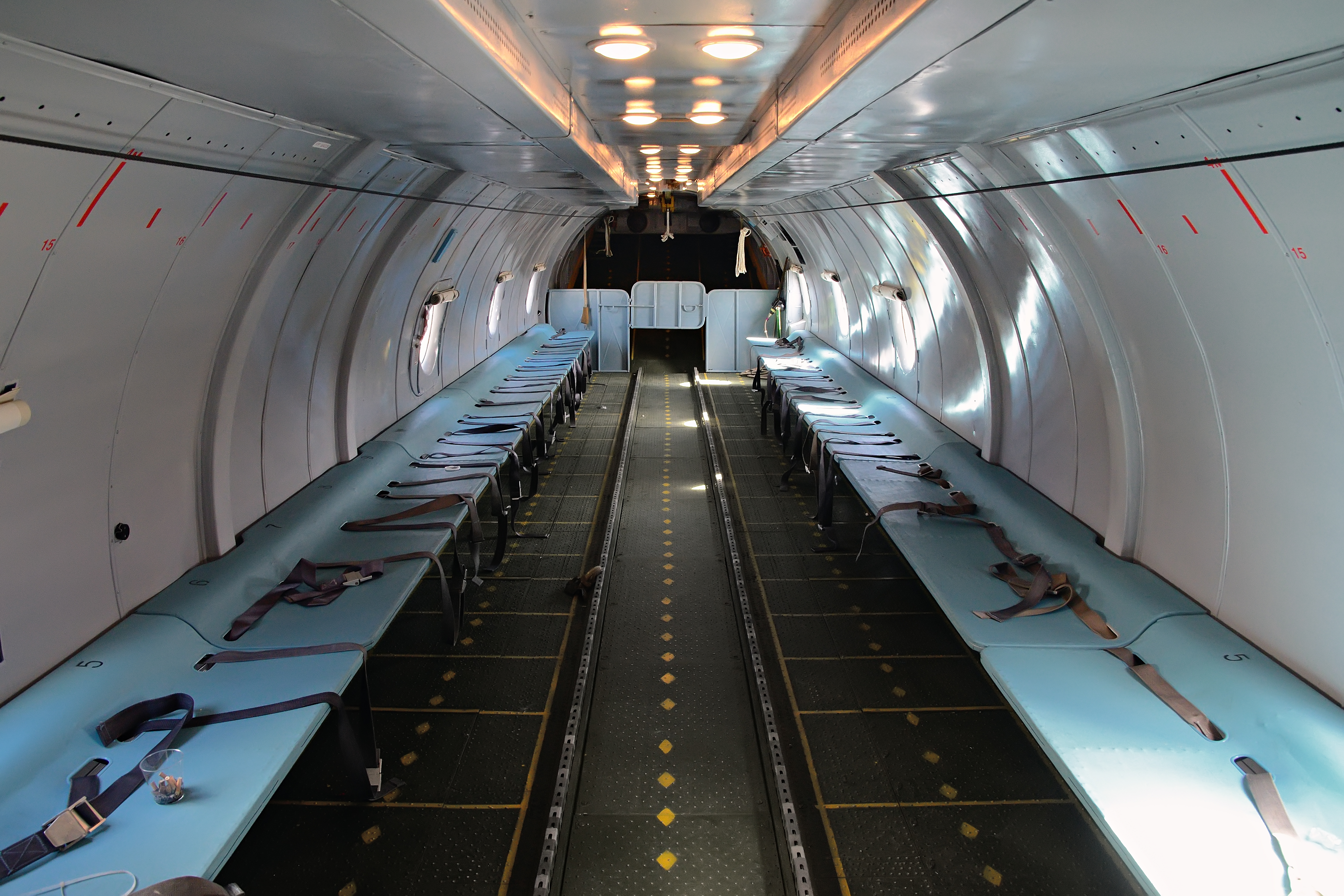
An-26 cargo cabin of Polar Airlines

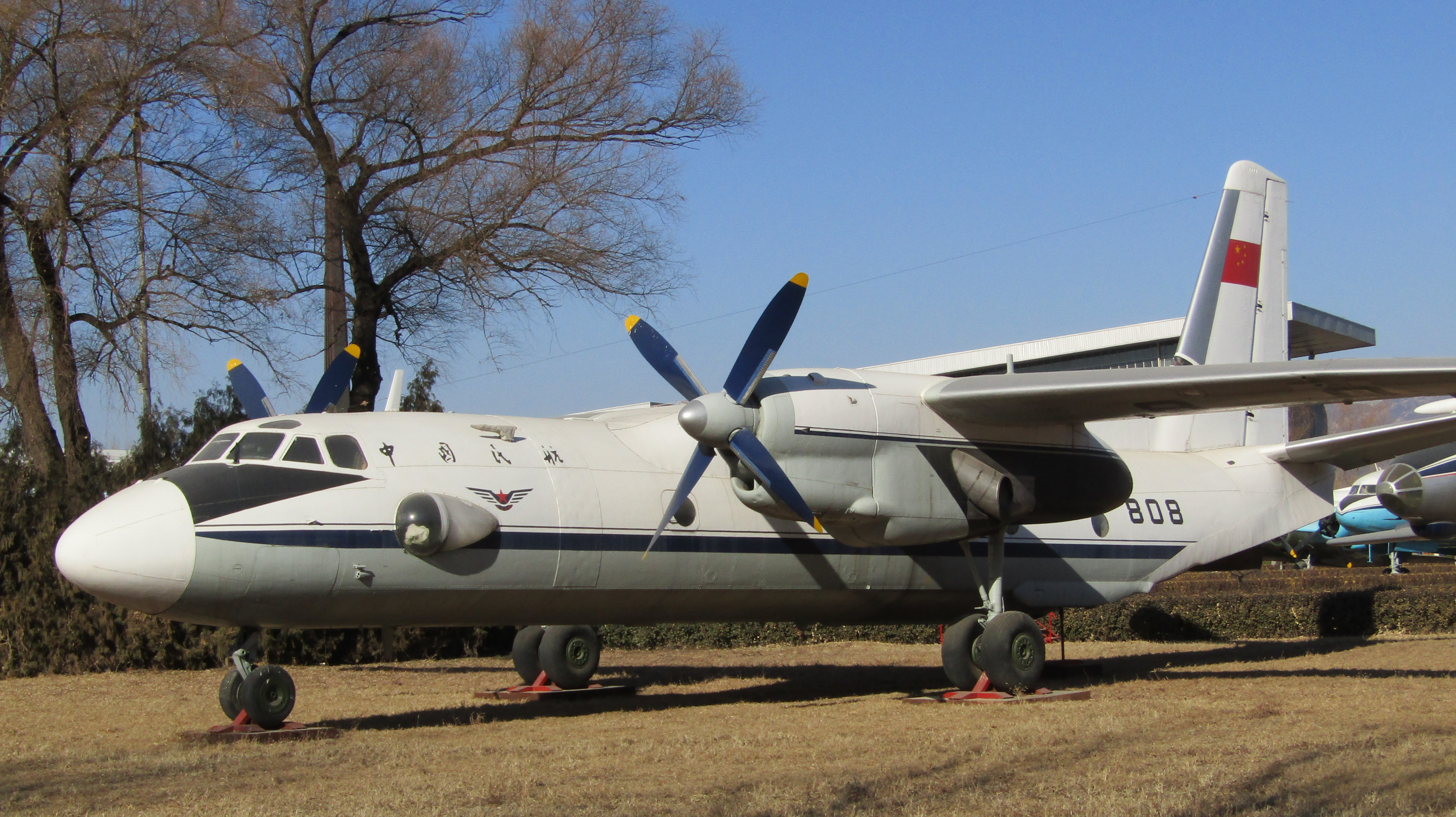
CAAC Antonov An-26 at China Aviation Museum, Beijing

An-26
"Curl-A" : Twin-engine tactical transport aircraft.
An-26-100
Convertible passenger/cargo aircraft modified from An-26 aircraft at the Kyiv plant from 1999.
An-26 Nel'mo
An arctic surveillance and reconnaissance aircraft retrofitted with Nel'mo equipment.
An-26 Pogoda
("Weather") Another aircraft for weather control duties, similar to the An-26 Tsiklon, with a simplified equipment test lab.
An-26 Polyot
("Flight") A single aircraft retrofitted for the purpose of research of unified air traffic control and monitoring system throughout the USSR, with a comprehensive navigation test lab including precision compasses and Doppler speed/shift sensors.
An-26 Sfera
("Sphere") A single production aircraft built as a laboratory for atmospheric research.
An-26 Shtabnoy
("Shtab" = "Headquarters") some An-26s delivered to the Soviet and DDR air forces for use as staff transports/mobile command posts.

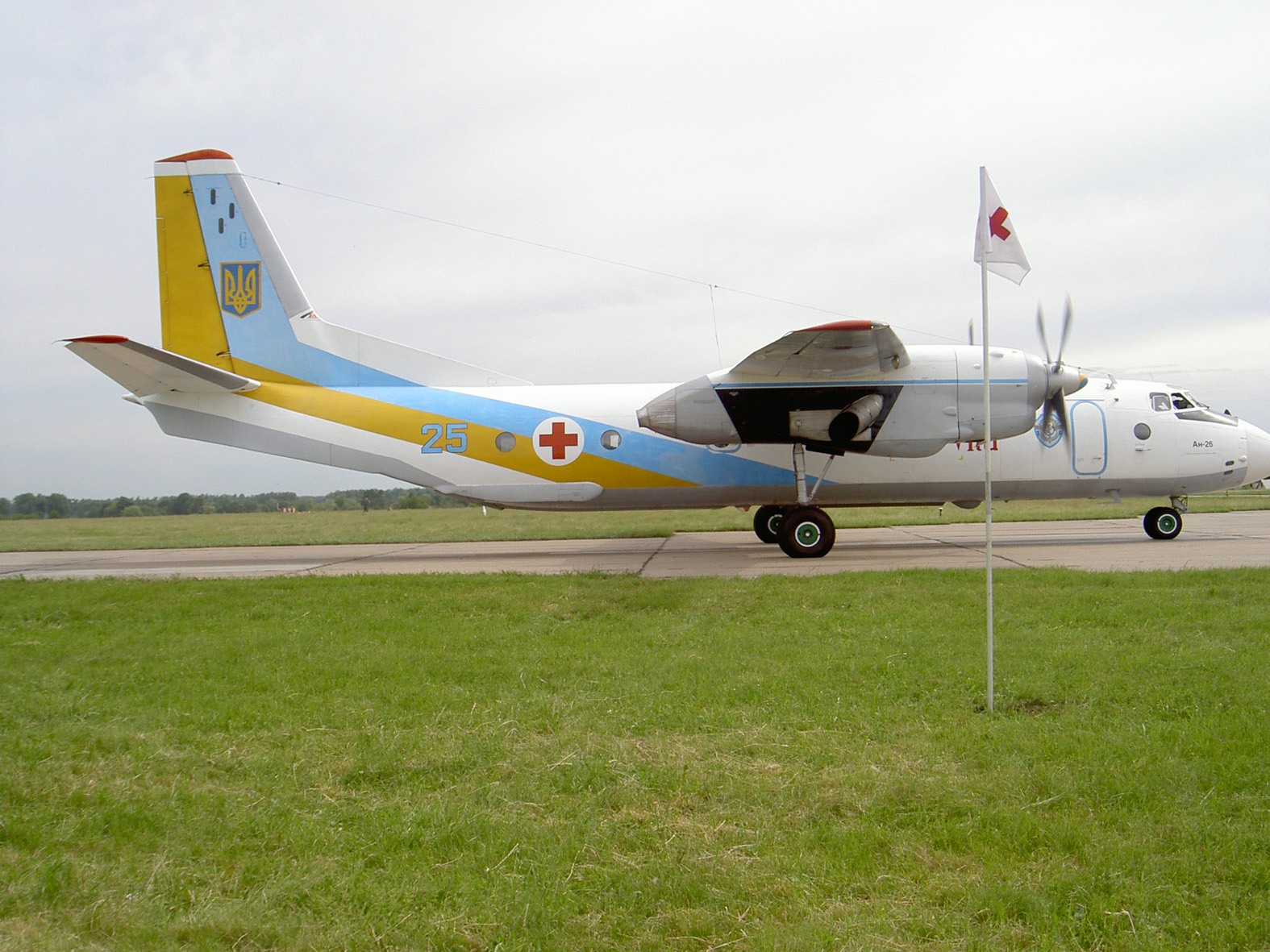
An-26 Vita

An-26 Vita
("Life") A single mobile operating room, surgery and intensive care unit ('25 Blue', c/n5406), for the Ukrainian Air Force.
An-26A
A one-off assault transport prototype with higher performance due to removal of some military equipment.
An-26ASLK
(Avtomatizirovannaya sistema lyotnogo kontrolya – automated flight control and monitoring system) : A modern flight control and monitoring system equipped with automatic calibration and navigation systems. Recognizable by the distinctive pod low on the forward fuselage side.
An-26B
A civil cargo version equipped with ramps which can be swung up against the cabin walls when not in use. It was also equipped with two ZMDB Progress (Ivchyenko) Al-24VT turboprop powerplants to deliver higher thrust.
An-26B
The prototype An-26B retrofitted as a mobile civilian emergency hospital.
An-26B Tsiklon
("Cyclone") A weather research/control and cloud-seeding aircraft for the Central Aerologic Laboratory. This aircraft was used for rain induction and protection using cloud-seeding chemicals dropped from slab-sided pods hung from pylons.
An-26B-100
Convertible passenger/cargo aircraft modified from An-26B aircraft at the Kyiv plant from 1999.
An-26BL
Alternative designation for the An-26L.
An-26BRL
Alternative designation of the An-26RL Arctic surveillance and reconnaissance aircraft.
An-26D
(Dal'niy – long-range) An extended range version with extra fuel in wing tanks and additional external tanks attached to the airframe of the fuselage. One aircraft ('21 Yellow', c/n 13806) was retrofitted and delivered, but no further orders were forthcoming.
An-26K Kaira
("Great Auk") A single An-26 aircraft converted to a Kaira test airframe for the development of airborne Laser guided systems.
An-26K Kaplya
("Drop" [of liquid]) After completion of the laser designator trials the An-26K Kaira was retrofitted to search or optically guided weapons as the navigation systems. During a night test flight at low level, in March 1989, the An-26K Kaplya suffered a massive bird strike, which consequently destroyed the windshield and injured the pilot, who involuntarily downed the aircraft into the Azov Sea.
An-26KPA
(Kontrol'no-Poverochnaya Apparatura – Testing and calibration equipment) : A navigation aids inspecting aircraft with comprehensive navigation equipment and calibration equipment.
An-26L
A single An-26, (14 Orange, c/n 00607), used at Sperenberg Airfield near Berlin, for airfield and NAVAID calibration.
An-26LL-PLO
(Letayuschaya Laboratoriya – Protivolodochnoy Oborony – ASW (Anti-Submarine Warfare) testbed) : A single An-26A aircraft, (c/n 0901), retrofitted and modified to accommodate range of sophisticated laboratory for surveillance systems, detecting and tracking stealthy nuclear submarines.
An-26LP
Firefighting version. At least 9 converted.
An-26M Spasatel
("Rescuer") Flying hospital with an emergency surgery facility. Two converted.
An-26P
(Protivopozharnyy – firefighting) : Aircraft fire-bomber, retrofitted with water tanks in pods on either side of the lower fuselage, which could be substituted for dispensers for silver iodide flares for rainmaking. At least 5 converted.
An-26P Prozhektor
("Projector" or "Searchlight") A single conversion of an An-26 as a guided missile system airframe.
An-26REP
(Rahdioelektronnoye protivodeystviye – ECM (Electronic Counter-Measures) ) : Electronic countermeasures aircraft fitted with active jammers in cylindrical pods on either side of the lower fuselage sides, as well as chaff and I/R flares for self-defense. One built but did not enter service.
An-26RL
(Razvedchik Ledovyy – An arctic surveillance, reconnaissance and monitoring) : An arctic surveillance, reconnaissance and monitoring aircraft used to monitor the icebergs and ice formations at arctic circle fitted with SLAR (Sideways Looking Airborne Radar) in long pods on either side of the lower fuselage, extra fuel in a cargo hold fuel tank, provision for surveyors and radar operators.
An-26RR
Alternative unit designation of the An-26RT ELINT(ELectronic INTelligence) aircraft.
An-26RT
"Curl-B": (First use of the designation) A basic designation for a series of ELINT aircraft fitted with a wide range of electromagnetic surveillance equipment. At least one aircraft, (tactical code '152'), retrofitted with the Tarahn (Ramming Attack) ELINT suite for use in Afghanistan.
An-26RT
(Retranslyator – Interpreter – Translator): (Substitute of designation) Battlefield communications relay aircraft, fitted with powerful Inzheer (Fig) radio relay system, for connecting forward units to headquarters units. 42 built.
An-26RTR
Alternative unit designation of the An-26RT ELINT aircraft.
An-26S
(Salon – [VIP] Lounge) : A new VIP Lounge aircraft for the Ukrainian Ministry of Defense delivered about 1997.
An-26Sh
(Shturmanskiy – Navigator) : Navigator trainer for the VVS, 36 built at Kyiv.

=== Non-USSR /-Ukrainian versions ===
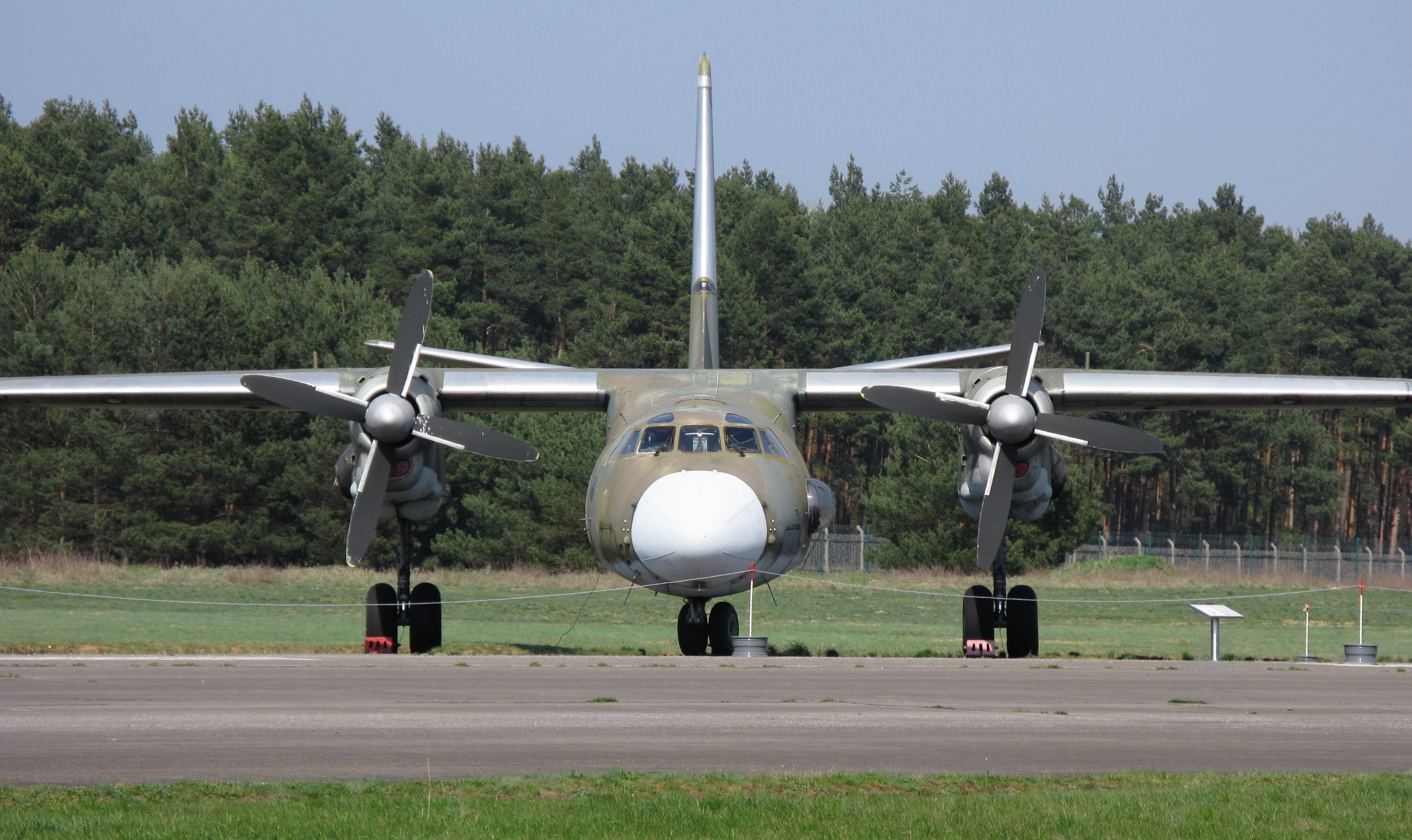
DDR An-26SM "369", later German Air Force "52+09", at the Museum Berlin-Gatow.

An-26SM
One aircraft modified as an ELINT aircraft for the East German Air Force.
An-26M
One aircraft modified for NAVAID calibration and flight monitoring for the East German Air Force and transferred to the post-unification German Air Force.
An-26ST
East German designation for An-26s used as staff transports.
An-26T
Unofficial East German designation for An-26s operated by Transportfliegerstaffel 24 (transport squadron 24).
An-26Z-1
Czechoslovak ELINT conversion of one aircraft for ELINT duties.
Xian Y-7H
Military transport version. Chinese production version.
Xian Y-14
Initial designation of the An-26 copy, later changed to 'Y-7H' (Hao – cargo).

== Operators ==
=== Military operators ===
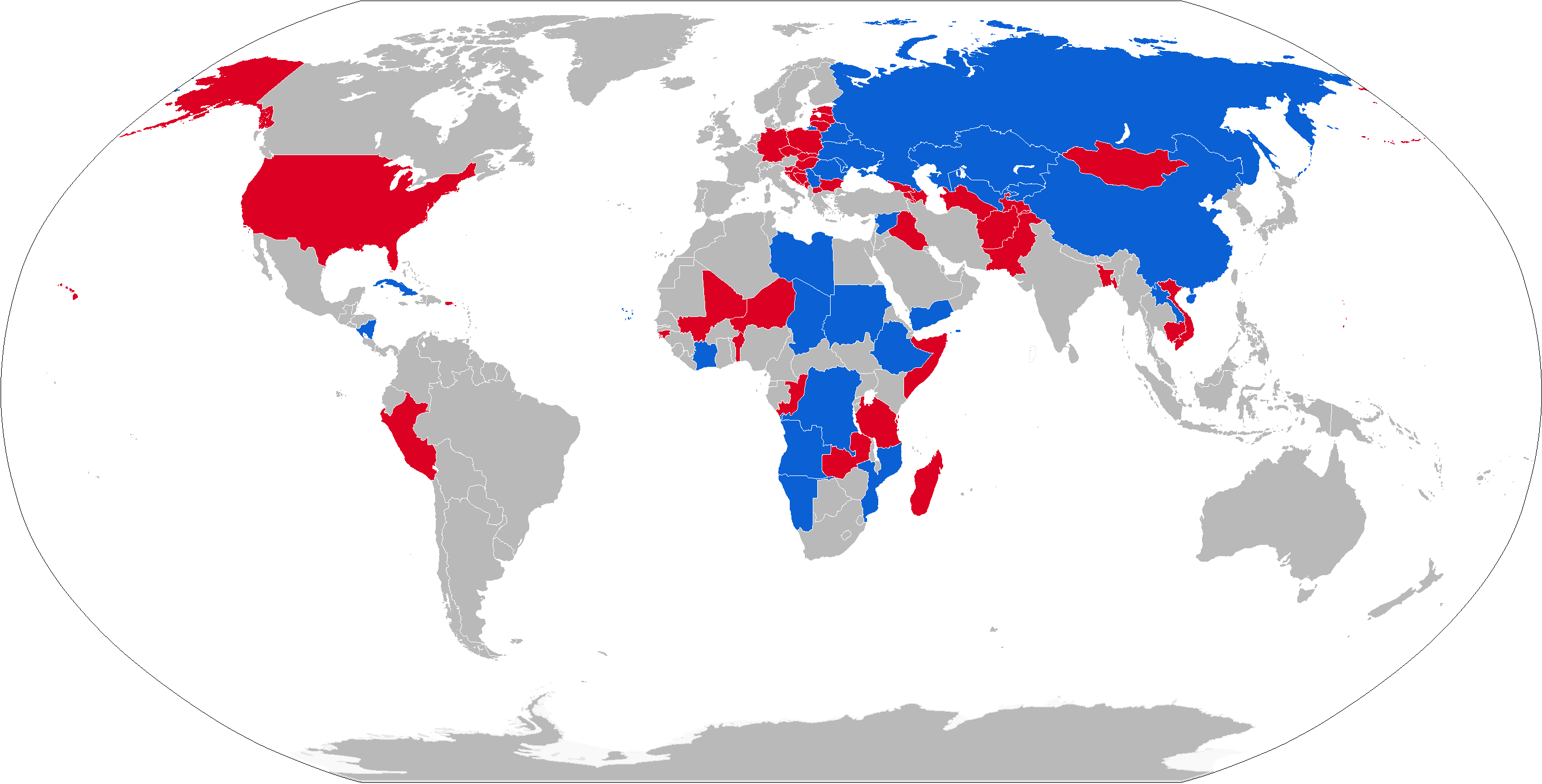
Military operators: Current Former

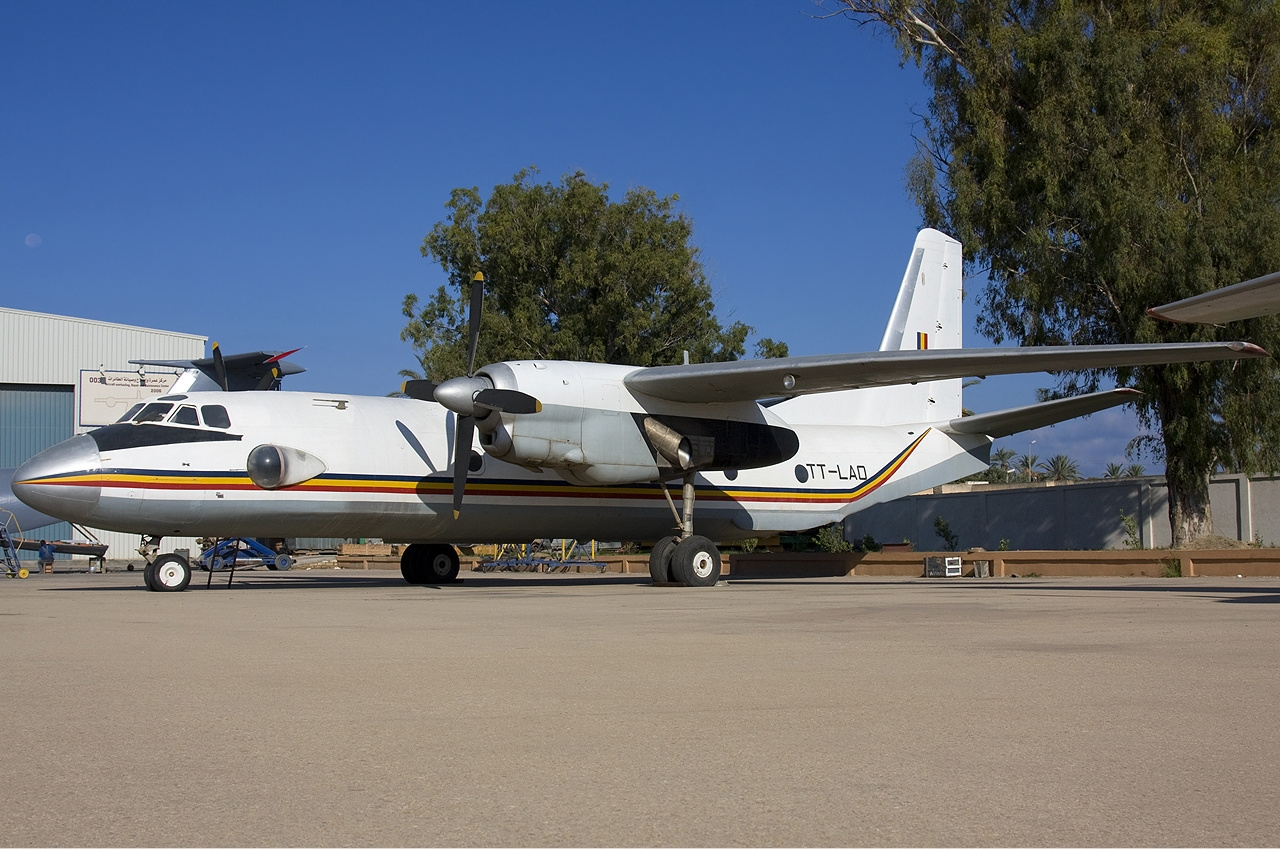
Chadian Air Force Antonov An-26 in 2009

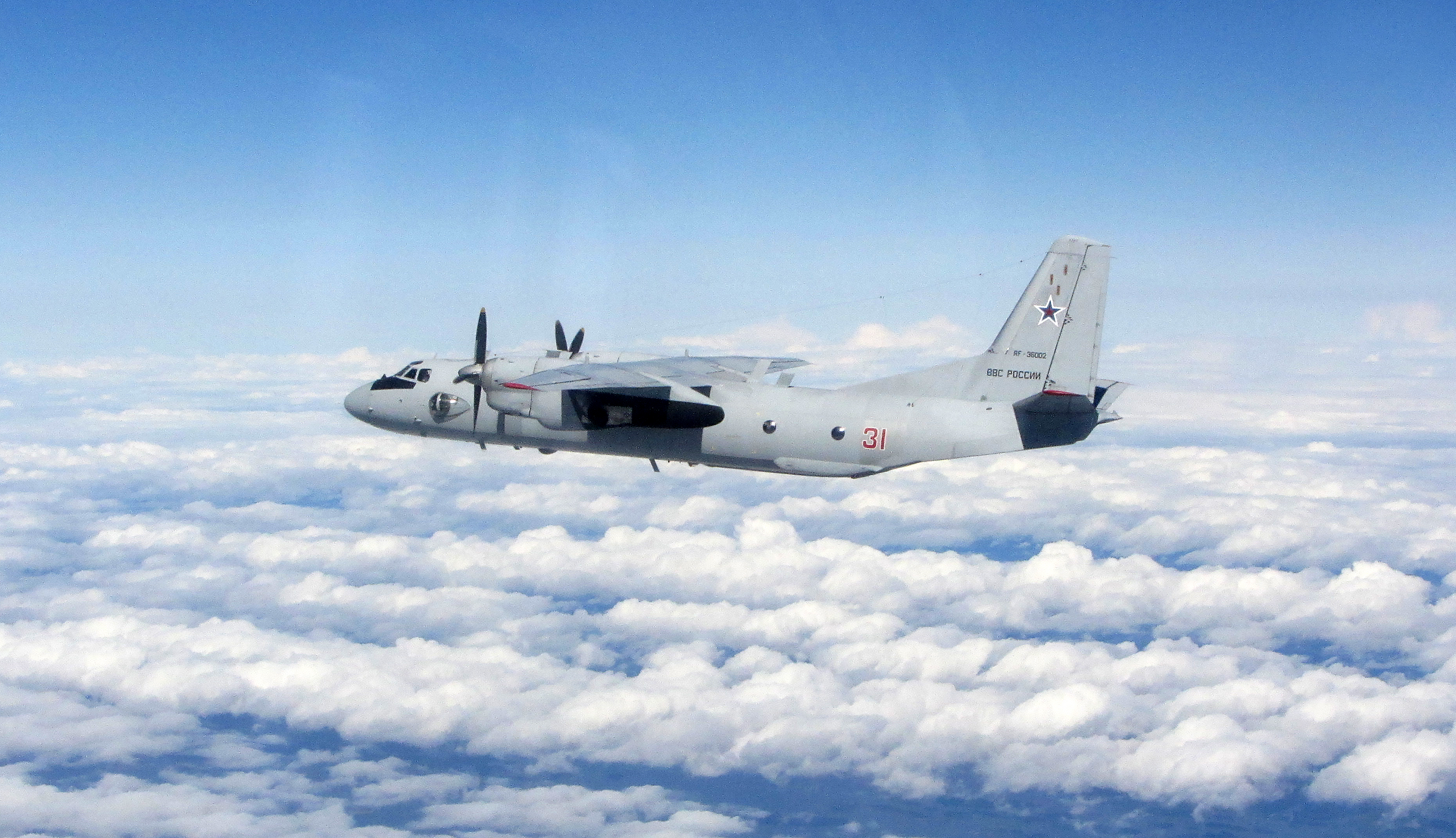
Russian An-26 intercepted by a British Typhoon over the Baltics in July 2015

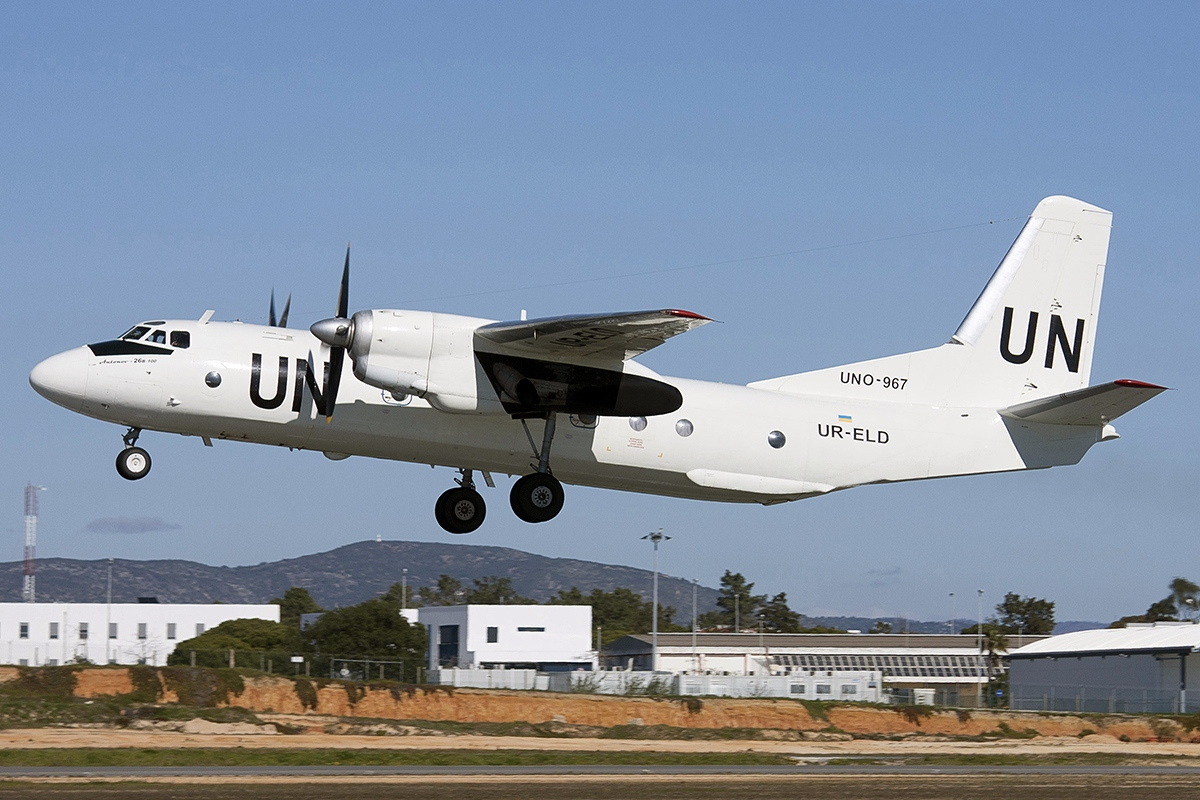
Ukrainian An-26B in Portugal

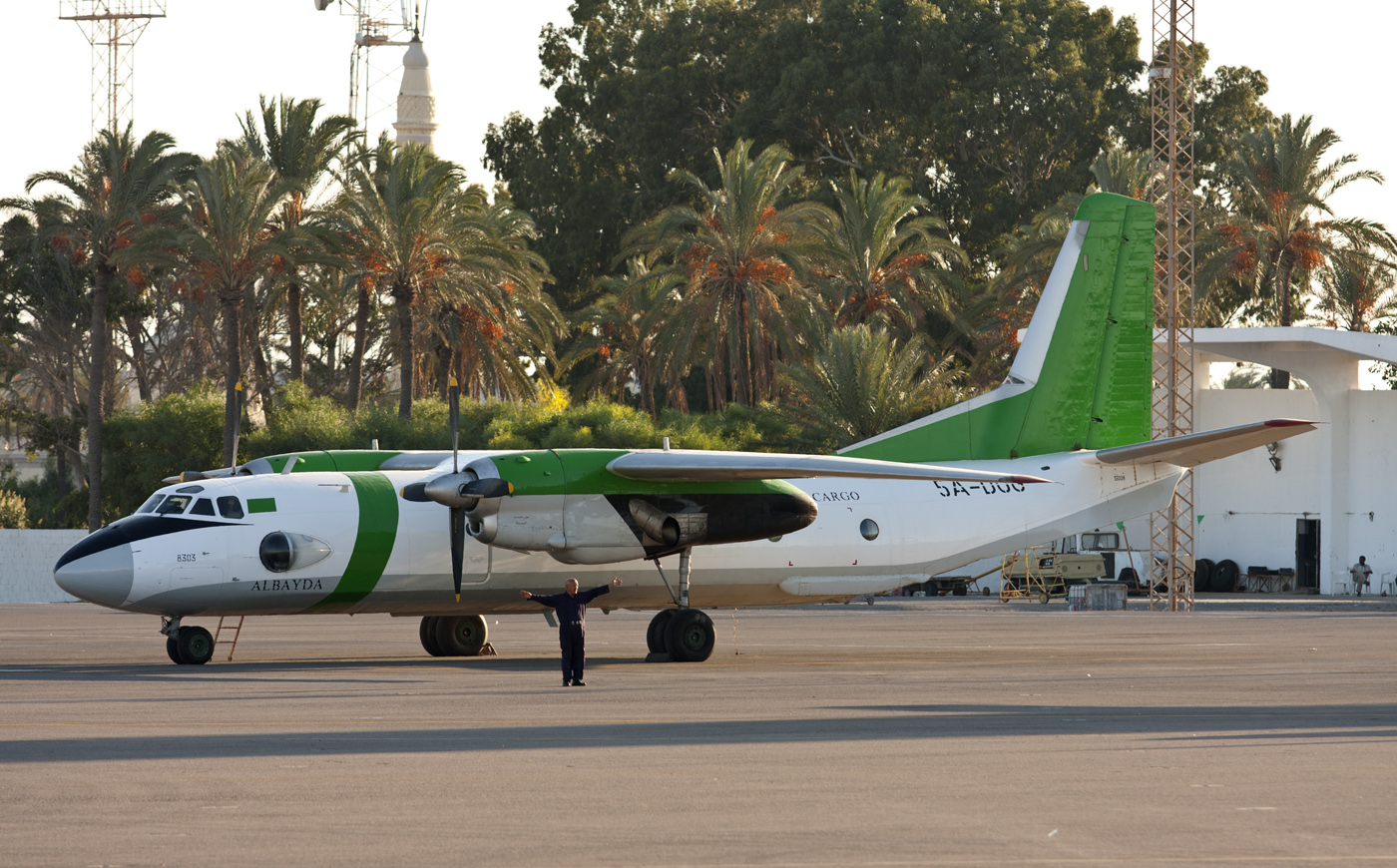
A Libyan An-26 in 2009

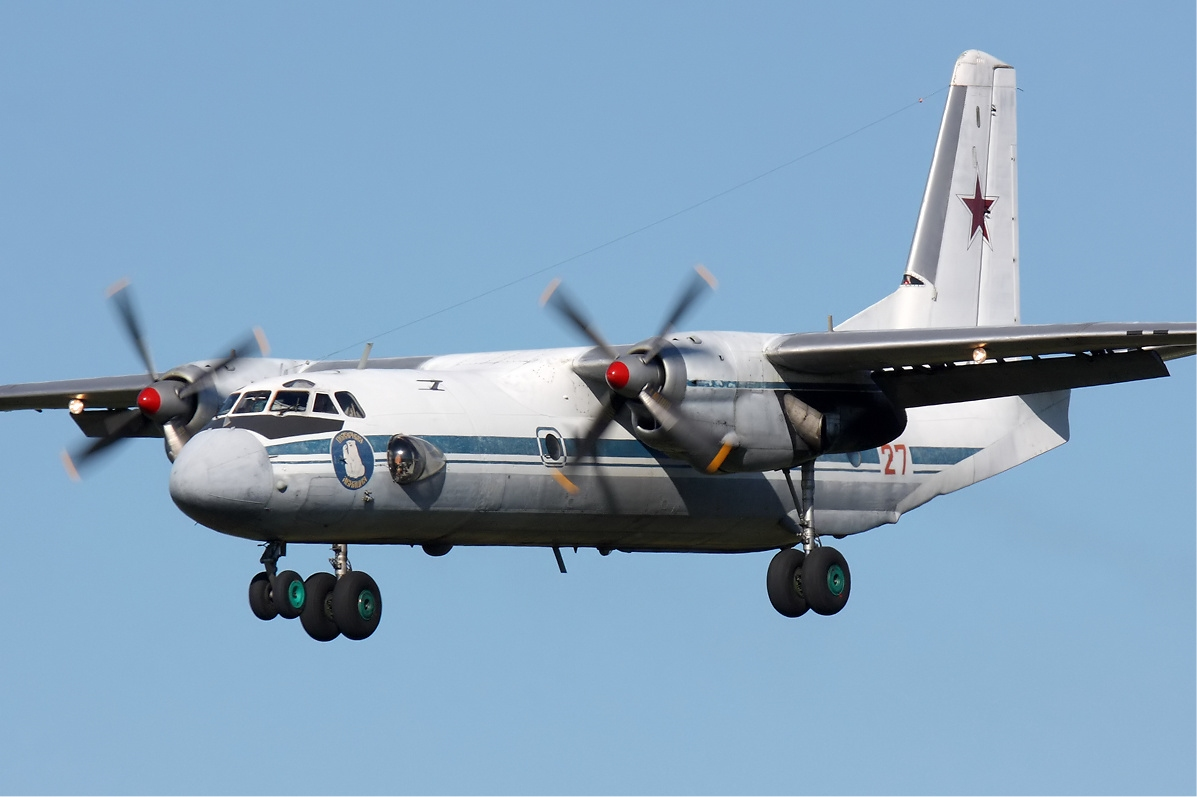
Russian Air Force Antonov An-26

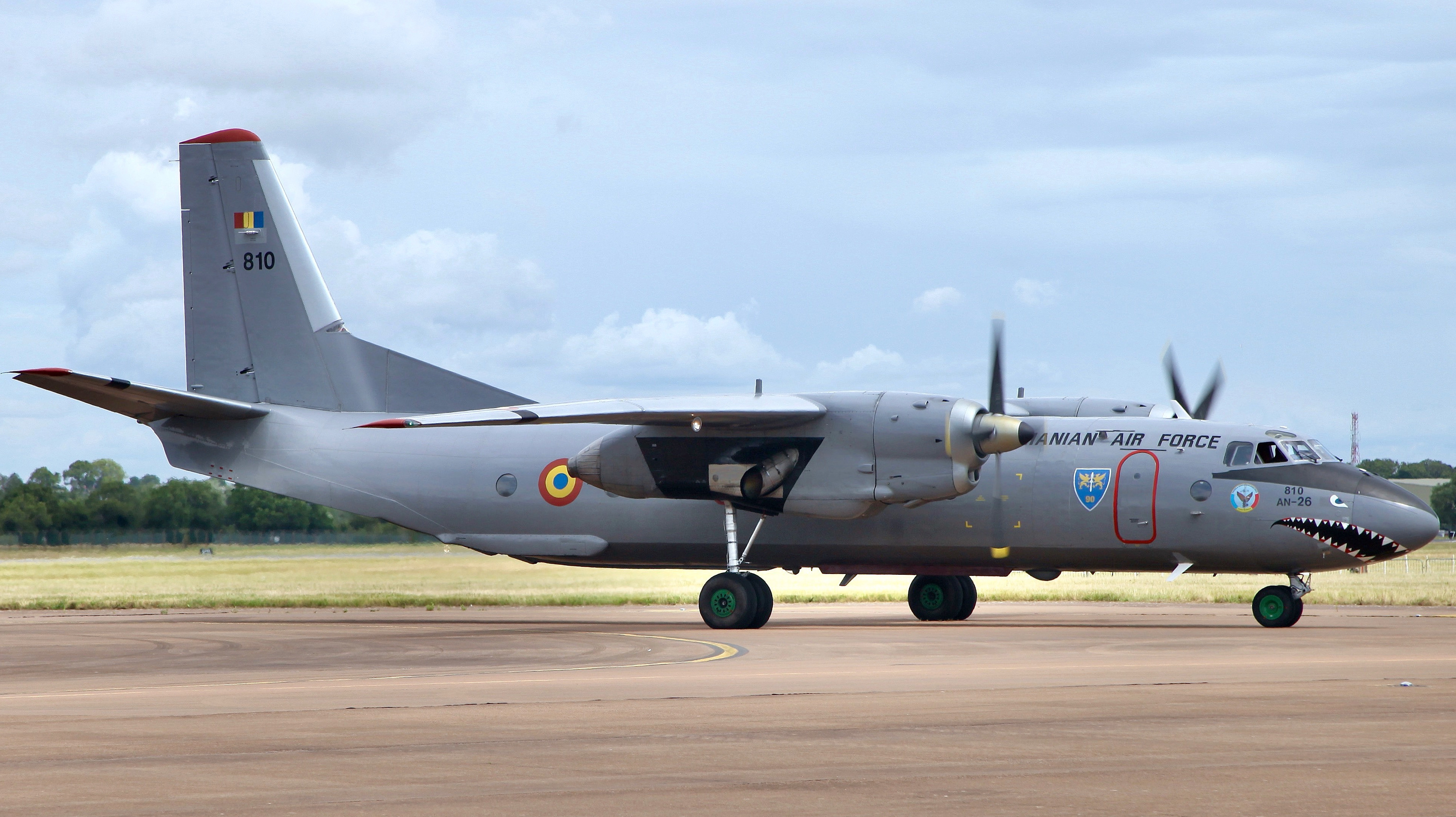
Romanian Air Force Antonov An-26 at RAF Fairford in July 2023

Angola

- National Air Force of Angola – 22 An-26s bought between 1976 and 1987. One aircraft still operational as of December 2021.

Belarus

- Belarusian Air Force – three operated December 2016.

Cape Verde

- Cape Verde Army – 3

Chad

- Chad Air Force – three in service December 2016.

China

- 23 Xian Y-7; 4 Xian Y-7-100; includes all types of Y-7 aircraft
  - People's Liberation Army Air Force
  - People's Liberation Army Navy

Cuba

- Cuban Air Force – operated 17, two in service December 2016.

Democratic Republic of the Congo

- Democratic Republic of the Congo Air Force – three in service as of 2021.

Ethiopia

- Ethiopian Air Force – one

Ivory Coast

- Ivory Coast Air Force – two in service as of 2021.

Kazakhstan

- Kazakh Air Force – five An-24 or An-26 in service December 2015.; Received one refurbished An-26 from Ukraine on 3 November 2017.

Laos

- Lao People's Liberation Army Air Force – one in service December 2016.

Libya

- Libyan Air Force – two An-24/An-26 as of December 2016.

Moldova

- Moldovan Air Force – one as of December 2016.

Mozambique

- Mozambique Air Force – one as of December 2016.

Namibia

- Namibian Air Force – one as of December 2016.

Nicaragua

- Nicaraguan Air Force – four as of February 2018. Three were donated by Russia in February 2025.

Puntland

- Puntland Maritime Police Force – one

Romania

- Romanian Air Force – one as of 2023

Russia

- Russian Aerospace Forces – 104 as of December 2016.
- Russian Naval Aviation
- Border Guard Service of Russia

Serbia

- Serbian Air Force – one

Sudan

- Sudanese Air Force – six as of December 2016; at least one has been used as an improvised bomber

Turkmenistan

- Military of Turkmenistan – one

Ukraine

- Ukrainian Naval Aviation – two as of December 2016 in the service of 10th Naval Aviation Brigade
- Ukrainian Air Force – around 22 as of 2017
- Ukrainian Air Guard

Uzbekistan

- Uzbek Air Force – four as of December 2016

Yemen

- Yemen Air Force – six

==== Former military operators ====
Afghanistan

- Afghan Air Force – Used until 1977, all remaining aircraft retired June 2011. One of their An-26 which defected to Pakistan, is preserved at PAF Museum, Karachi.

Bangladesh

- Bangladesh Air Force

Benin

- Benin Air Force – two

Bulgaria

- Bulgarian Air Force – five used from 1984 until 2011

Cambodia

- Royal Cambodian Air Force

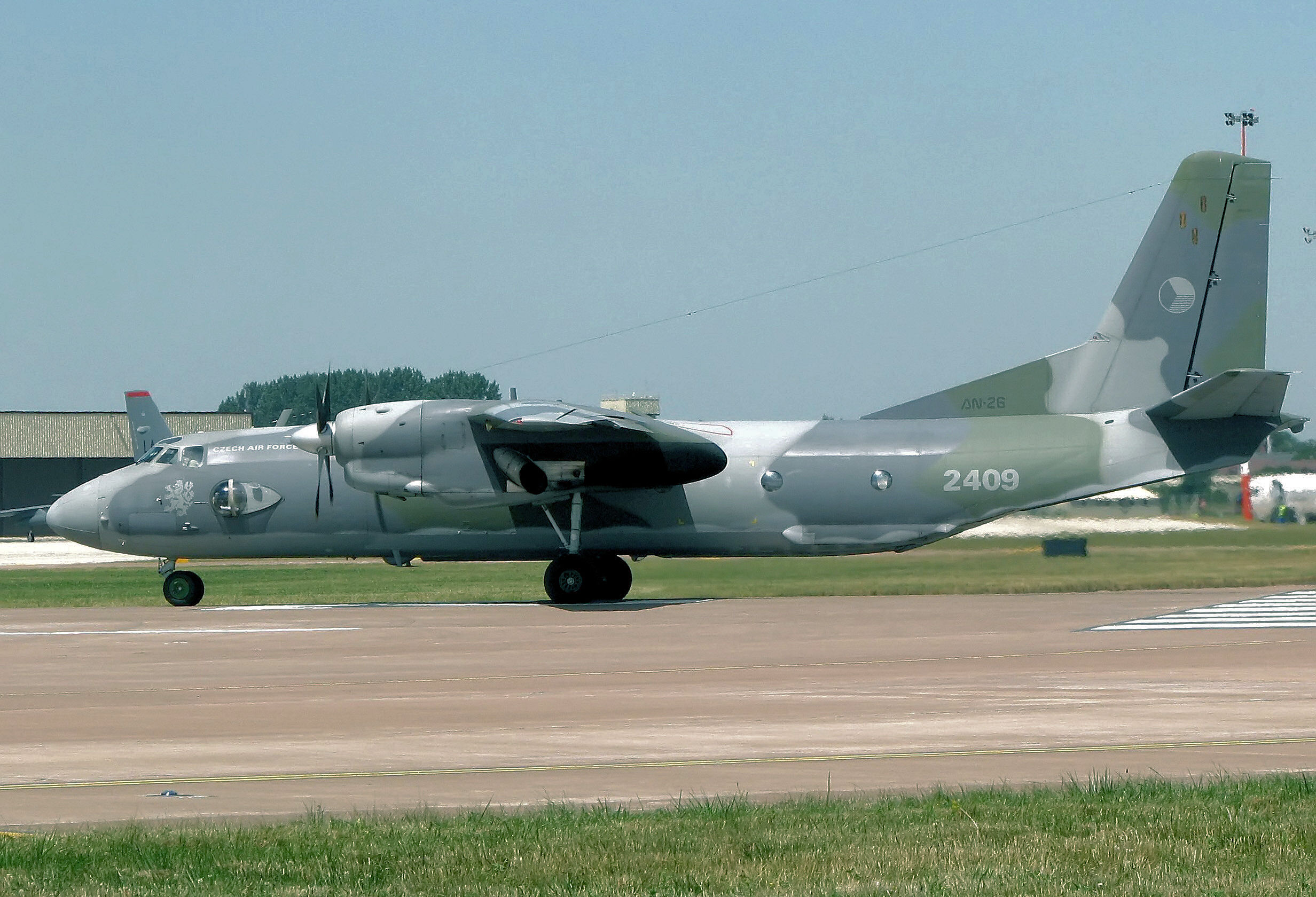
An-26 of the Czech Air Force

Republic of the Congo

- Congolese Air Force – one

Czechoslovakia

- Czechoslovak Air Force

East Germany

- East German Air Force

Germany

- German Air Force

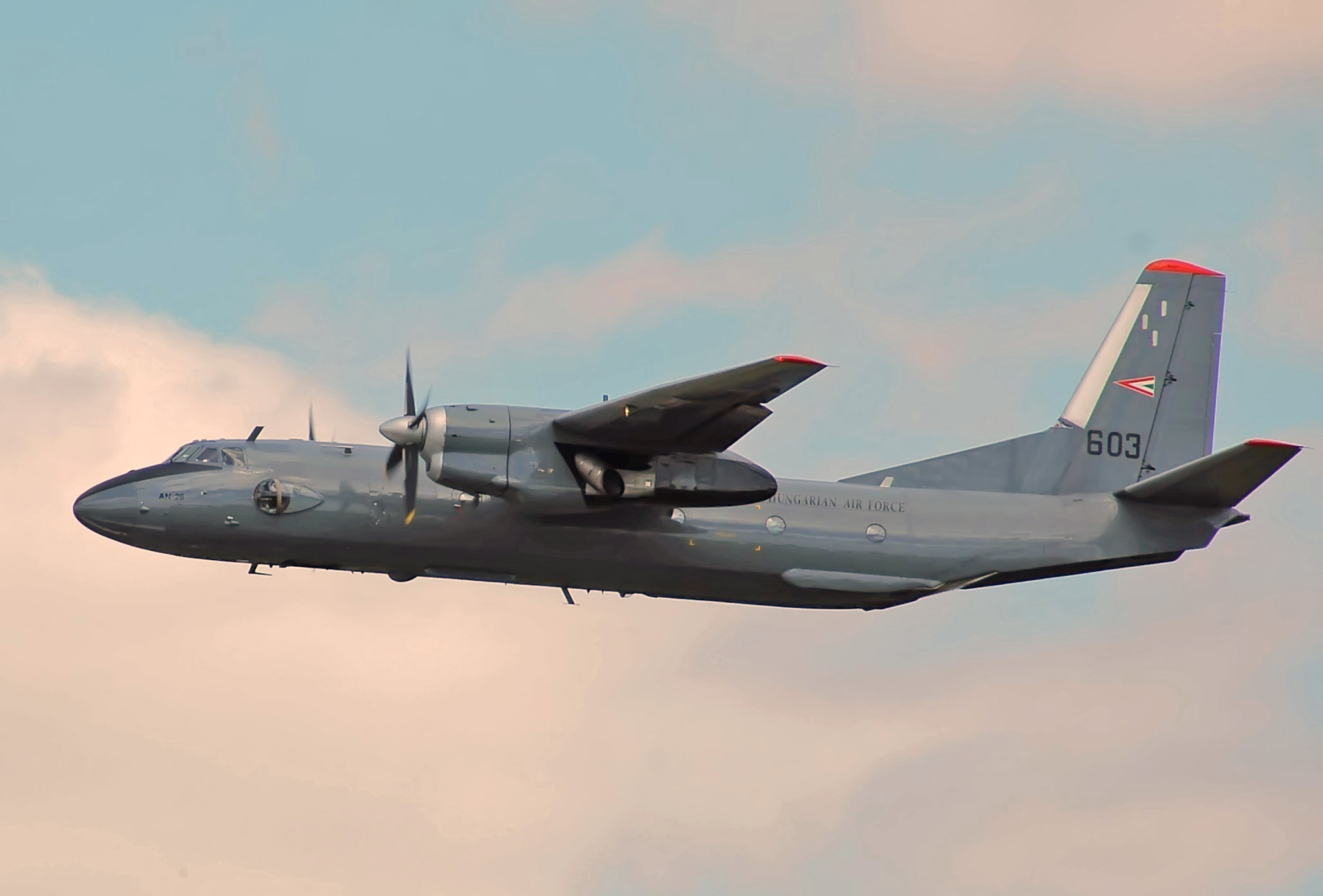
Hungarian Air Force Antonov An-26 departs RIAT at RAF Fairford, England

Guinea-Bissau

- Guinea-Bissau Air Force

Hungary

- Hungarian Air Force – 11 delivered from 1974, last one retired June 2020.

Iraq

- Iraqi Air Force

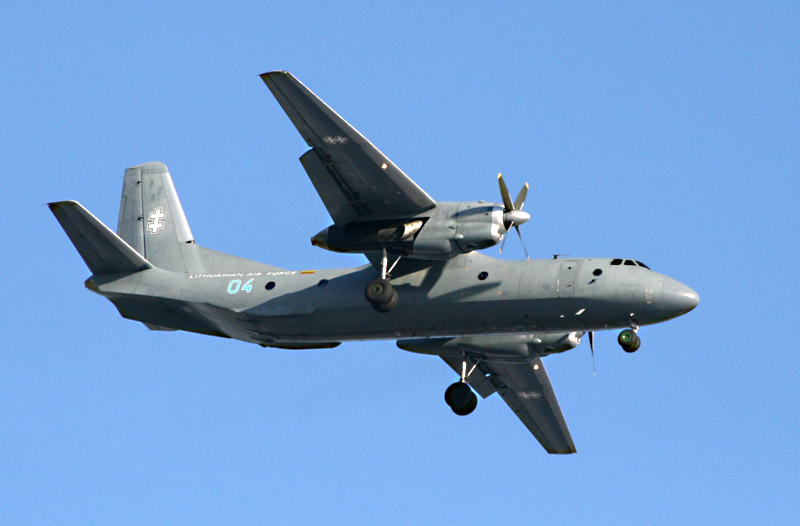
An-26 of the Lithuanian Air Force (now retired)

Lithuania

- Lithuanian Air Force – three operated

Madagascar

- Malagasy Air Force – two delivered in 1980

Mali

- Malian Air Force – one

Mongolia

- Mongolian Air Defense Forces Command – four

Niger

- Niger Air Force – one, bought from Libya in 1997

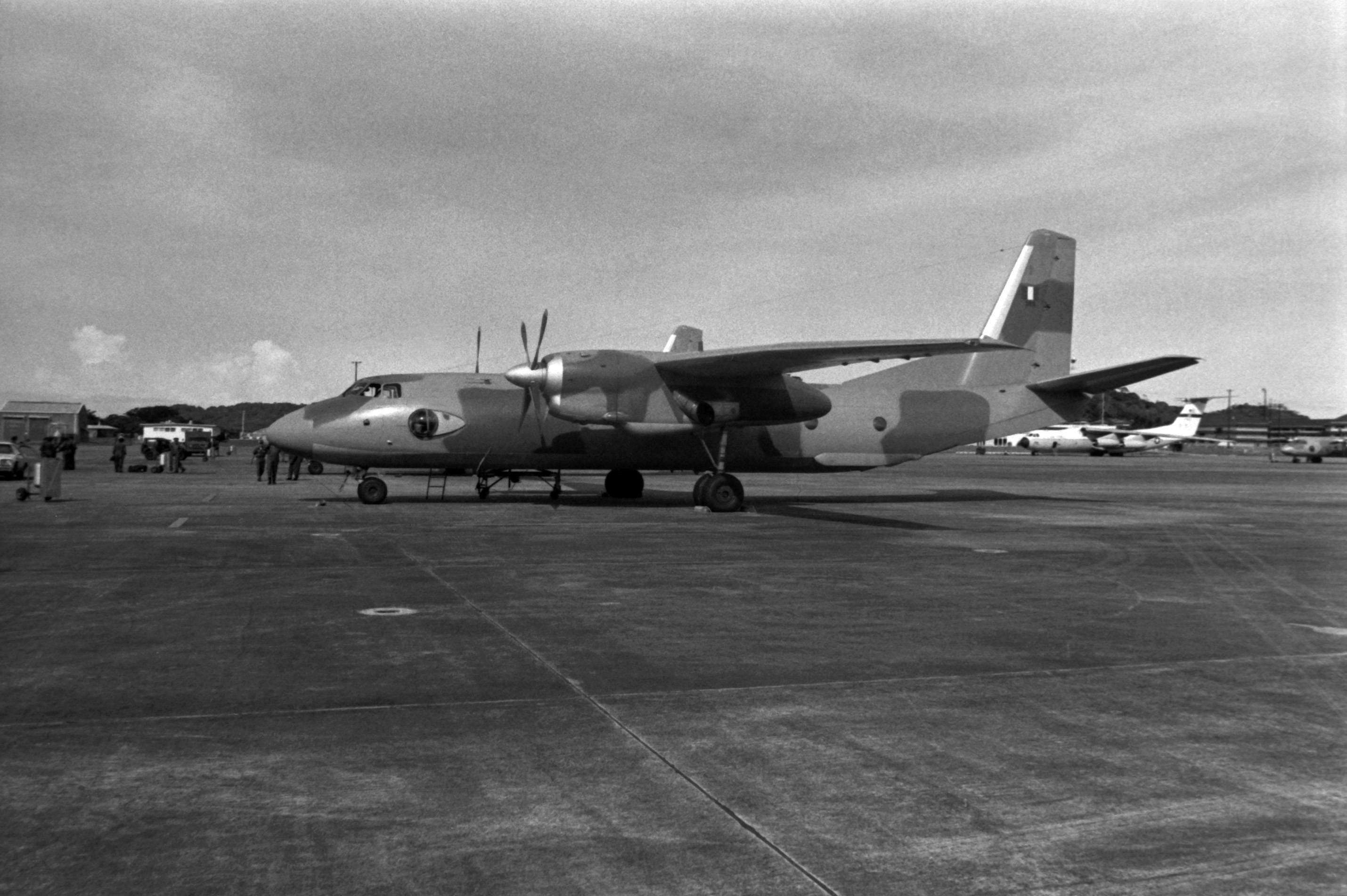
A Peruvian An-26

North Yemen

- Yemen Arab Republic Air Force – one

Pakistan

- Pakistani Air Force

Peru

- Peruvian Air Force – 22 operated from 1977 to 1993

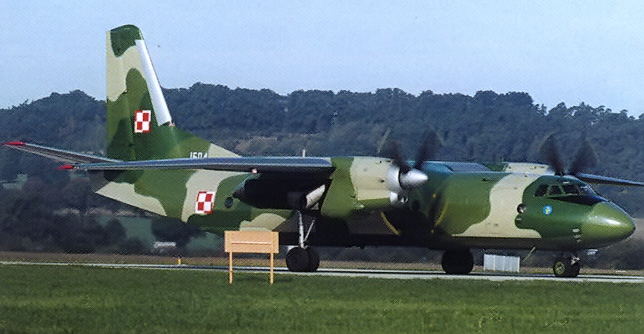
An-26 of the Polish Air Force (Operated before 2009, now retired)

Poland

- Polish Air Force – 12 operated from 1972 to January 2009; retired

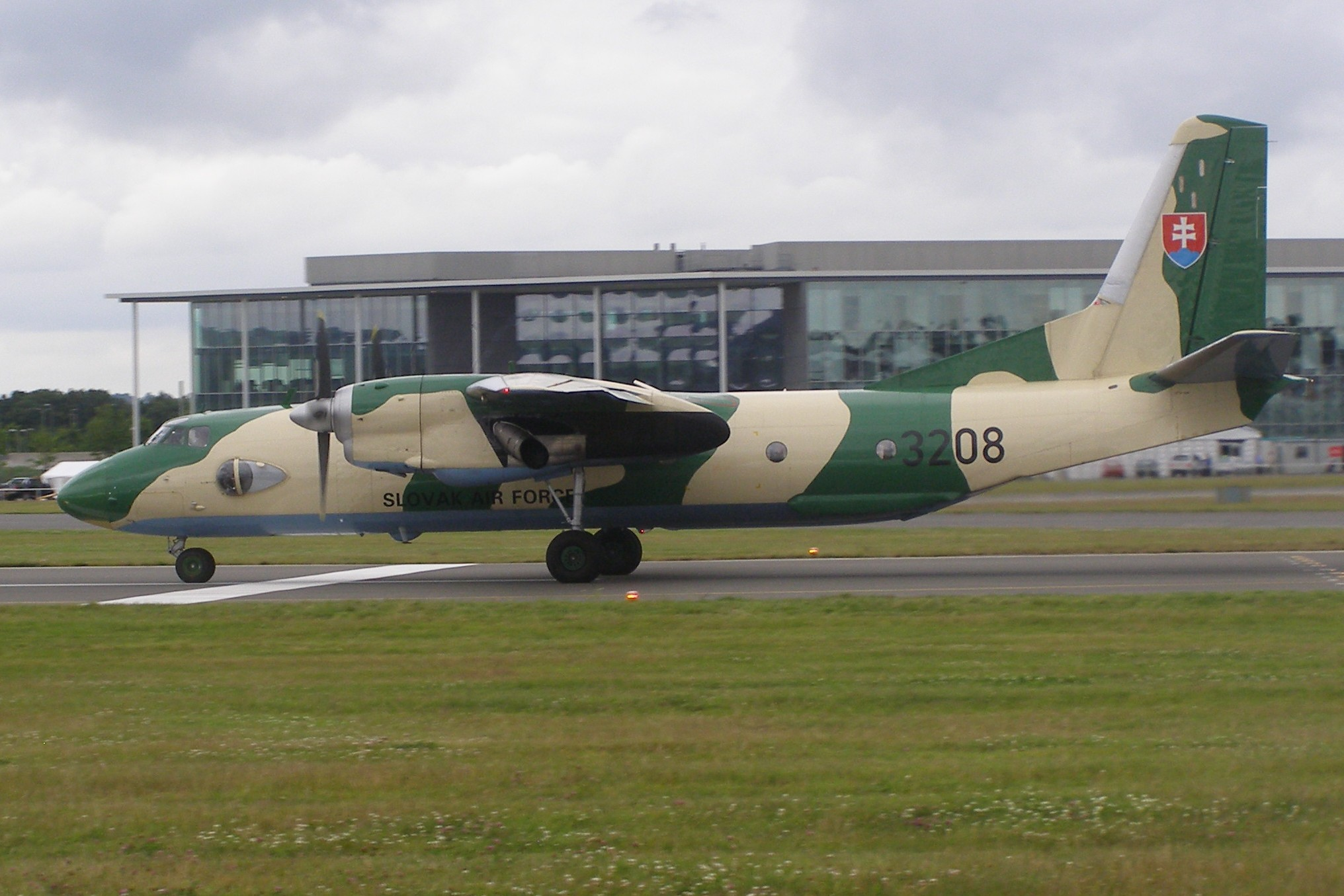
Slovak Air Force An-26 at Farnborough Airshow, 2008

Slovakia

- Slovak Air Force – Two, retired in 2016, to be replaced by Alenia C-27J Spartan aircraft beginning in 2017.

Somalia

- Somali Air Corps

South Yemen

- People's Democratic Republic of Yemen Air Force – three bought in 1979

Serbia

- Serbian Air Force – one retired in 2023

Soviet Union

- Soviet Air Force – Passed on to successor states in 1991
- Soviet Naval Aviation –

Syria

- Syrian Air Force – Six as of 2023. As of late 2025, none listed by World Air Forces 2026.

Tanzania

- Tanzanian Air Force – none; retired

Transnistria

- Armed Forces of Transnistria

United States

- United States Air Force – Operated 2003–2007 by the 6th Special Operations Squadron

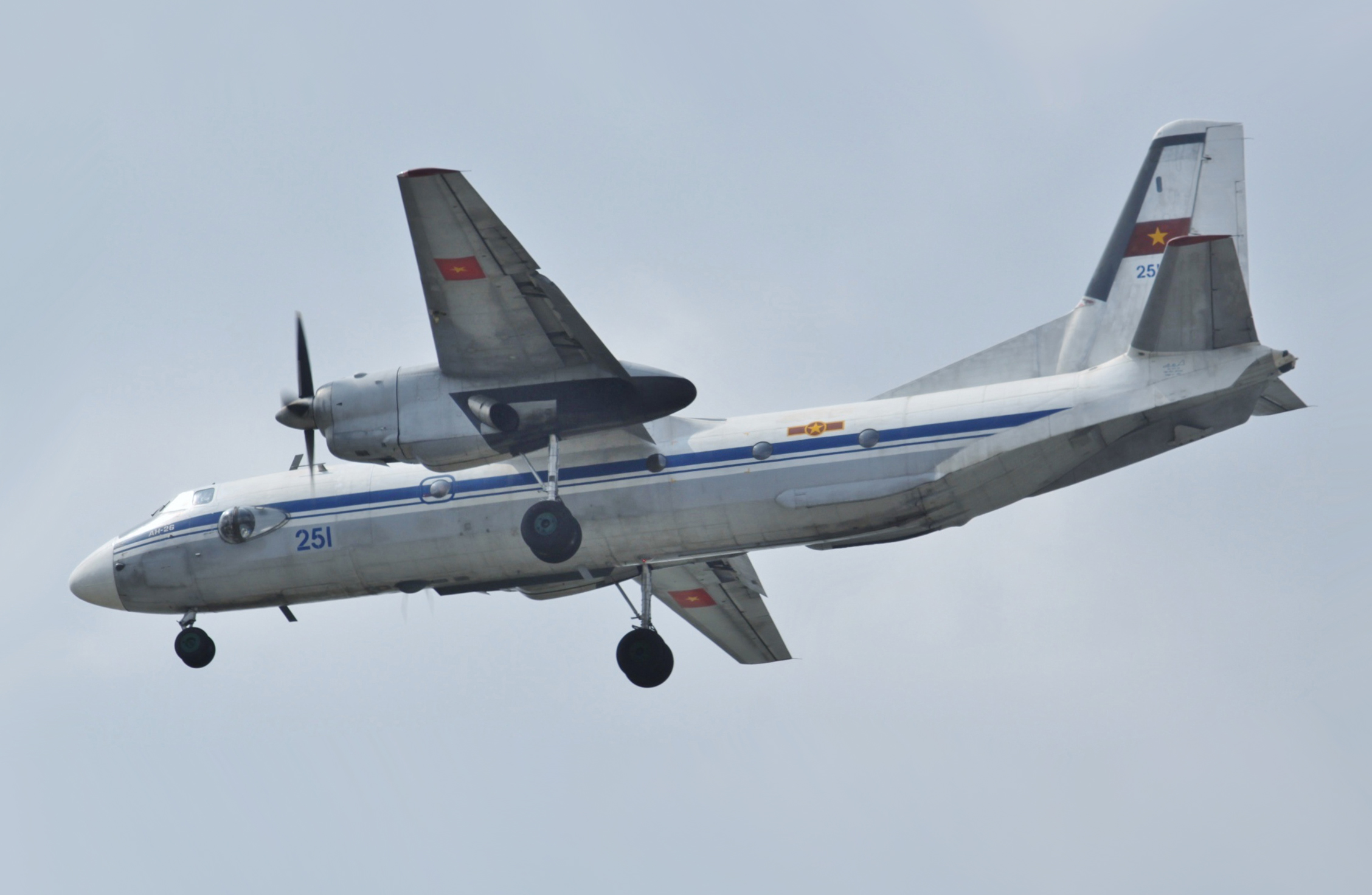
Vietnam People's Air Force Antonov An-26

Vietnam

- Vietnam People's Air Force

Yugoslavia

- Yugoslav Air Force – 14

Zambia

- Zambian Air Force and Air Defense Command – four

=== Civil operators ===
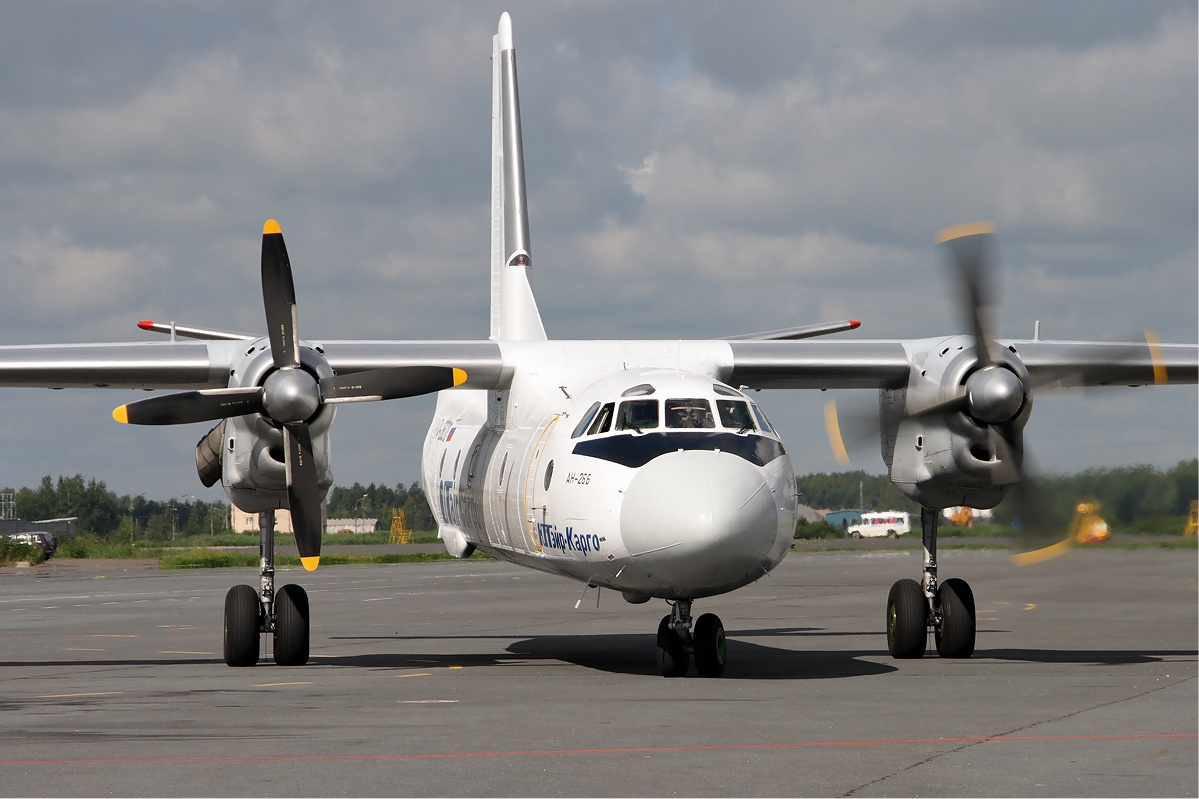
UTair Cargo An-26 at Pulkovo Airport

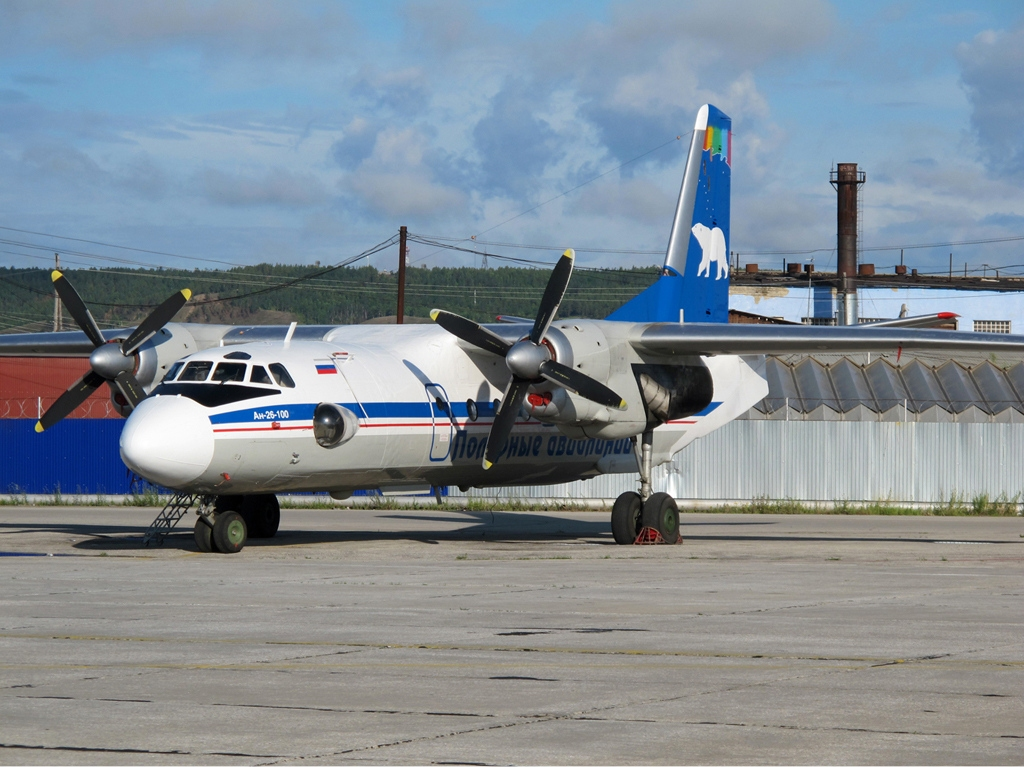
Polar Airlines An-26-100 at Yakutsk Airport

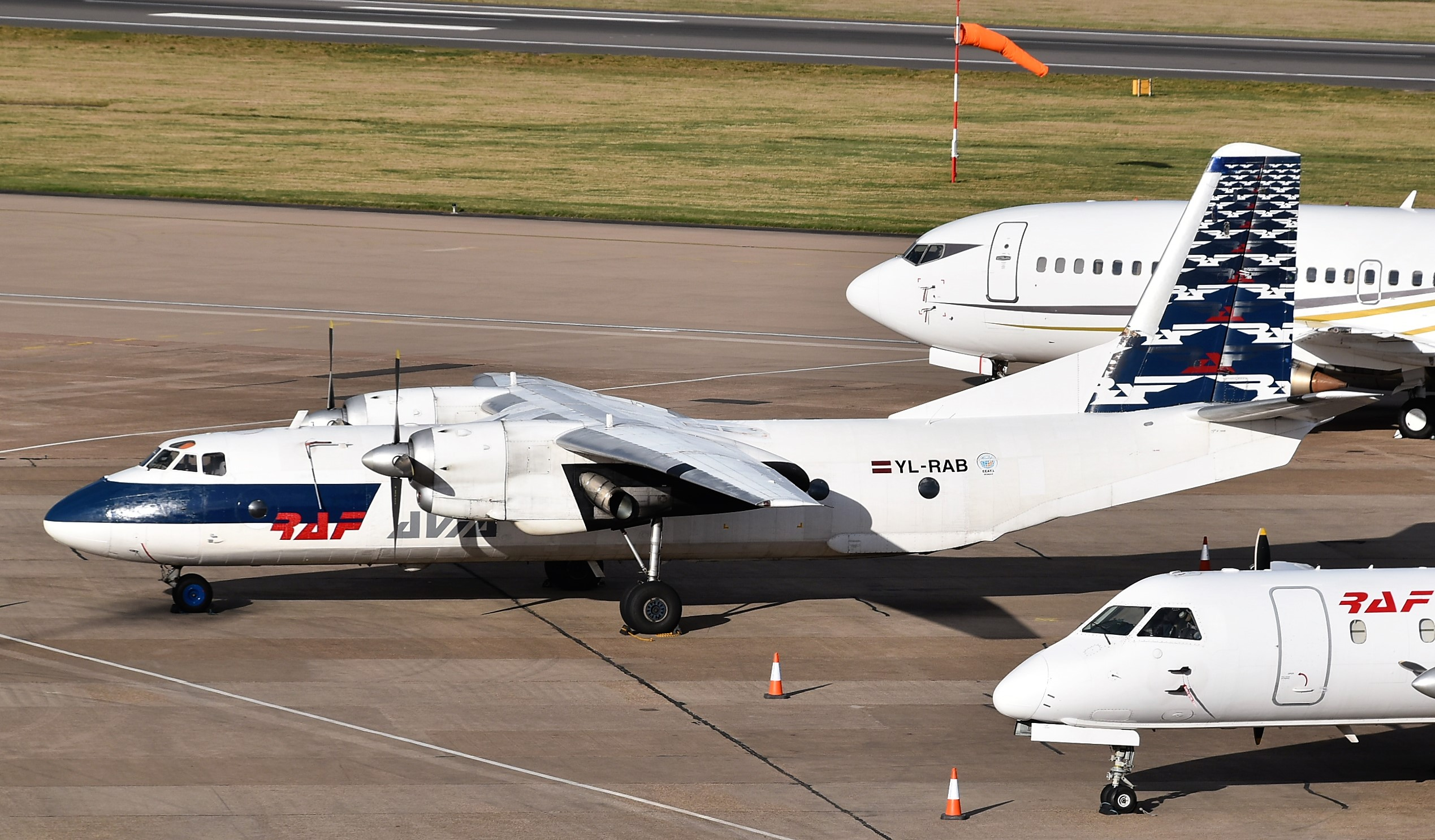
RAF-Avia An-26B at Birmingham Airport

Belarus

- Genex (two)

Bulgaria

- Air Bright (one)

Colombia

- Sadelca (one)
- Servicio Aéreo del Vaupés SELVA (three)

Cuba

- Aerogaviota (three)

Indonesia

- Asia Cargo Airlines

Denmark

- SAS Cargo Group (one)

Hungary

- CityLine Hungary (four)

Latvia

- RAF-Avia (five)

Moldova

- Valan International Cargo Charter

Peru

- Aero Condor (one)
- Amazon Sky (two)
- ATSA (one)
- Cielos Andinos (two)

Philippines

- Interisland Airlines
- Mosphil Aero

Poland

- Exin (six)

Russia

- Angara Airlines (three)
- Chukotavia (three)
- IrAero (ten)
- Khabarovsk Airlines (three)
- Kostroma Air Enterprise (four)
- KrasAvia (four)
- Polar Airlines (three)

Sudan

- Badr Airlines (one)

Tajikistan

- Tajik Air (one)

Ukraine

- Aero-Charter Airlines (former) (three)
- Air Urga (ten)
- Antonov Airlines (former)
- ARP 410 Airlines (five)
- Constanta Airline (four)
- Eleron Airlines (two)
- Vulkan Air (three)

Venezuela

- Solar Cargo (two)

AN-26 operators within Aeroflot and post break-up Commonwealth of Independent States (data from)
UGA – (Upravleniye Grazhdanskoy Aviatsii – Civil Aviation Directorate)	OAO – (Otdel'nyy Aviaotryad – independent flight detachment)	LO – (Lyvotnyy Otryad – flight squad) / Aviaeskadril'ya – squadrons)	Home Base	CIS (Commonwealth of Independent States) Airline)
Azerbaijan	Baku	360th / 1st & 3rd squadrons	Baku-Bina	AZAL (no An-26s)
Belarusian	Gomel'	105th / 2nd squadron	Gomel'	Gomel'avia
	1st Minsk	353rd / 2nd Squadron	Minsk-Loshitsa (Minsk-1)	Belavia;Minsk-Avia
Central Regions	Bykovo	61st / 4th Squadron	Moscow-Bykovo	Bykovo Avia
	Kursk		Kursk	Kurskavia
	Tula	294th	Tula	Tula Air Enterprise
East Siberian	Chita	136th / 1st Squadron	Chita	Chita Avia
	Irkutsk	134th	Irkutsk-1	Baikal Airlines
Far Eastern	1st Khabarovsk	289th	Khabarovsk	Dalavia Far East Airlines Khabarovsk
	Kamchatka CAPA / Petropavlovsk		Petropavlovsk-Kamchatskiy	Petropavlovsk-Kamchatsky Air Enterprise
	Sakhalin CAPA / Yuzhno-Sakhalinsk UAD	147th	Yuzhno-Sakhalinsk / Khomutvo	Sakhalinskiye Aviatrassy
Komi	Pechora		Pechora	Komiavia;Komiinteravia
Krasnoyarsk	Igarka	251st	Igarka	
	2nd Krasnoyarsk	126th	Krasnoyarsk-Severnyy	Kras Air
	Khatanga	221st / 2nd Squadron	Khatanga	
Leningrad	2nd Leningrad	70th / 2nd Squadron	Leningrad-Rzhevka	Rzhevka Air Enterprise
	Pskov	320th / 2nd Squadron	Pskov	Pskov Avia
Lithuanian	Vilnius	277th	Vilnius	Lithuanian Airlines*
Magadan	Anadyr'	150th / 2nd Squadron	Anadyr'-Ugol'nyy	Chukotavia
	1st Magadan	185th	Magadan-Sokol	Kolyma-Avia
	Seymchan		Seymchan	NW Aerial Forestry Protection Base
Moldavian	Kishinyov	407th	Kishinyov	Air Moldova
North Caucasian	Krasnodar	241st	Krasnodar	ALK Kuban Airlines
	1st Krasnodar	406th	Krasnodar	
Tajik	Leninabad	292nd / 2nd Squadron	Leninabad	
Training Establishments Directorate	KVLUGA (Kirovograd Civil Aviation Higher Flying School)		Kirovograd	Ukraine State Flight Academy
Turkmen	Krasnovodsk	360th	Krasnovodsk	Turkmenistan Airlines/Khazar
Tyumen'	Salekhard	234th / 5th Squadron	Salekhard	
	2ndTyumen'	357th	Tyumen'-Roschchino	Tyumen'AviaTrans (UTair)
Ukrainian	Dnipropetrovsk	327th	Dnipropetrovsk-Volos'kie	Dniproavia
	Kirovograd		Kirovograd-Khmelyovoye	Air URGA
	Simferopol	84th	Simferopol	Aviakompaniya Krym / Crimea AL
Urals	Izhevsk		Izhevsk	Izhavia
	Magnitogorsk		Magnitogorsk	Magnitogorsk Air Enterprise
	1st Perm'		Perm'-Bolshoye Savino	Perm Airlines
	1st Sverdlovsk		Sverdlovsk-Kol'tsovo	Ural Airlines [Yekaterinburg]
Volga	Penza	396th	Penza	Penza Air Enterprise
	Saransk		Saransk	Saransk Air Enterprise
West Siberian	Barnaul	341st	Barnaul	Barnaul Air Enterprise
	Kemerovo	196th	Kemerovo	
	Novokuznetsk	184th	Novokuznetsk	Aerokuznetsk
	Omsk	365th	Omsk	Omsk-Avia
	Tolmachevo	448th	Novosibirsk-Tolmachevo	Sibir'
	Tomsk	119th	Tomsk	Tomsk Avia
Yakutian	Kolyma-Indigirka		Cherskiy?	
	Mirnyy	190th	Mirnyy	Almazy Rossii – Sakha (Alrosa)
	Yakutsk	139th / 3rd Squadron	Yakutsk	
GosNII GVF (Gosudarstvenny Nauchno-Issledovatel'skiy Institut Grazdahnskovo Vozdushnovo Flota – state scientific test institute for civil air fleet)			Moscow - Sheremet'yevo-1	

*note: Lithuania was not a CIS country.

== Accidents and incidents ==
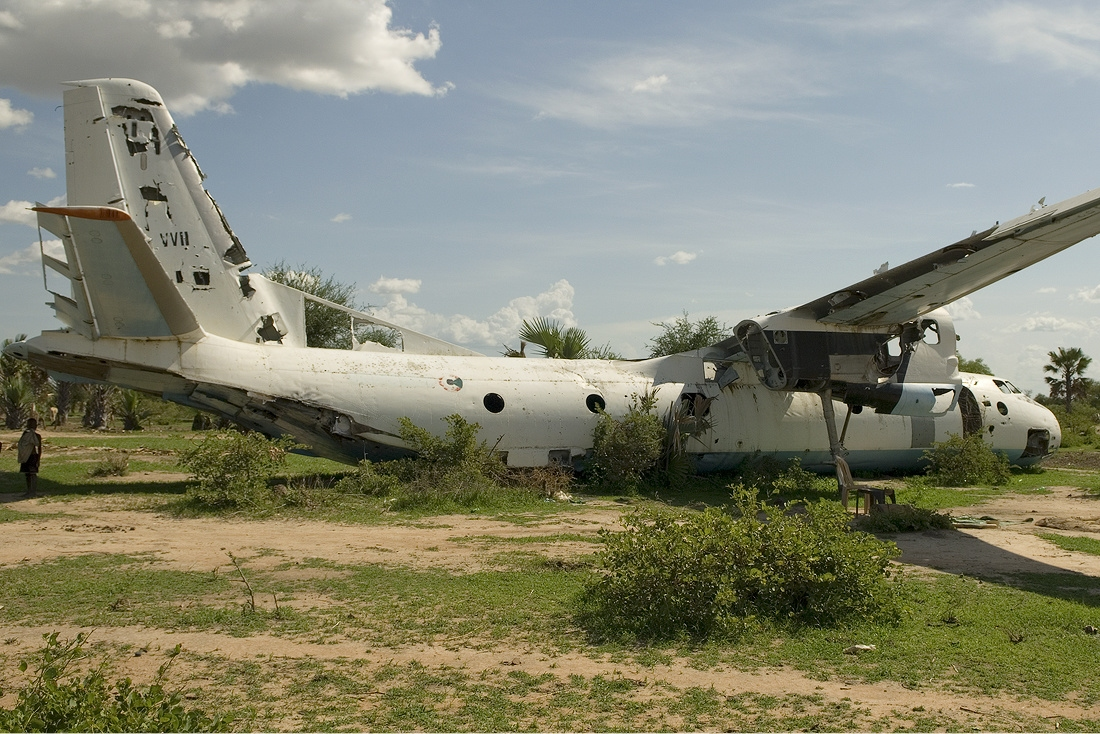
Sudan Air Force Antonov An-26-100 crash-landed in 1997 at the airstrip of Gogrial. The plane was hit by SPLA-fire and had to make an emergency landing.

=== 1970s ===
- 23 May 1976: An Aeroflot An-26 (CCCP-26567) crashed short of the runway near Teply Klyuch Airport, Russia.
- 14 July 1977: A National Air Force of Angola An-26 was shot down by UNITA rebels near Cuangar; 30 people on board died.
- 18 August 1977: An Aeroflot An-26 (CCCP-26536) landed hard at Ust-Kuyga Airport due to pilot error; no casualties.
- 9 December 1978: An Aeroflot An-26 (CCCP-26547) lost control and crashed shortly after takeoff from Cherskiy Airport due to a shifted load; all seven on board died. The cargo had not been secured properly.
- 26 March 1979: Aeroflot Flight 37293, an An-26 (CCCP-26569), struck a wooded hillside near Baykit, Russia, four of 12 on board died.

=== 1980s ===
- 12 December 1980: A Soviet Air Forces An-26 was shot down by guerrilla forces in Angola near the border with Namibia; five people on board died.
- 23 December 1981: Aeroflot Flight 22237, an An-26 (CCCP-26505), crashed while on approach to Severo-Yeniseisk Airport in poor weather during an attempted go-around after descending too soon; two of seven on board died. The flight mechanic and navigator were drunk.
- 14 January 1982: An Ethiopian Air Force An-26 crashed near Addis Ababa; 73 Ethiopian, Libyan and Cuban troops died. This accident remains the deadliest involving the An-26.
- 11 February 1982: Vietnam People's Air Force An-26 26264 was shot down by two Royal Thai Air Force Northrop F-5Es and crashed in a rice field near Prachinburi, Thailand, during an intelligence-gathering mission from Phnom Penh; reportedly, one of 13 on board died.
- 15 March 1982: A Soviet Navy An-26 (MSN 6805) crashed shortly after a night-time take off from Anapa Airport when the flaps were retracted prematurely; all nine people on board died.
- 29 November 1982: a TAAG Angola Airlines An-26 (D2-TAB) flew into a mountain in the Bibala region; all 15 people on board died.
- 23 December 1982: An Aeroflot An-26 (CCCP-26627) crashed on takeoff from Rostov Airport; all 16 on board died. The aircraft was overloaded.
- 6 May 1983: a Soviet Air Forces An-26 hit trees on a night-time approach in heavy snow as it was trying to land at Klyuchi, Klyuchevsky District, Altai Krai; 33 of the 37 people on board died.
- 3 July 1984: A Peruvian Air Force An-26 (FAP-377) crashed into mountains northeast of Lima; all five people on board died.
- 22 January 1985: a Soviet Air Forces An-26 operating in Afghanistan exceeded the maximum allowable speed and broke apart; all eight people on board died.
- 3 May 1985: Soviet Air Force An-26 101 red (callsign "CCCP-26492") collided in mid-air with Aeroflot Flight 8381, a Tupolev Tu-134, due to ATC errors; all 94 on board both aircraft died.
- 4 September 1985: A Bakhtar Afghan Airlines An-26 (YA-BAM) was shot down by a SAM near Kandahar; all 52 people on board died.
- 30 March 1986: A Mozambique Air Force An-26 crashed while trying to land at Pemba Airport. All three crew and 41 of the 46 passengers died.
- 6 December 1986: a Hungarian Air Force An-26 (MSN 2210) crashed after take-off from Budapest-Ferihegy Airport, most likely because of icing. Four of the five people on board died.
- 9 February 1987: an Afghan Air Force An-26 was shot down by Mujahideen guerrillas shortly after takeoff from Kabul International Airport; all 36 people on board died.
- 19 February 1987: a Soviet Air Forces An-26 crashed in fog near Stadnitsa while attempting to land at Vinnytsia; all nine people on board died.
- 6 March 1987: an Aeroflot An-26 (CCCP-26007) struck a mountain near Almaty after failing to change heading; all nine people on board died.
- 11 June 1987: a Bakhtar Afghan Airlines An-25 (YA-BAL) was shot down by rebels near Khost; 53 of the 55 people on board died.
- 18 June 1987: a Peruvian Air Force An-26 (FAP-392) crashed into a mountain near Saposoa; all 46 people on board died.
- 13 August 1987: an Afghan Air Force An-26 was reportedly shot down; all 12 on board died.
- 1 September 1987: an Afghan Air Force An-26 was shot down near Khost, all eight people on board died.
- 13 September 1987: a Soviet Air Forces An-26 was shot down by Afghanistan rebels near Kunduz; all 15 people on board died.
- 16 September 1987: Vietnam People's Air Force An-26 285 flying from Hanoi to Ho Chi Minh City crashed at Bảo Lộc while on approach to Ho Chi Minh City; all 31 crew and passengers on board died, mostly military personnel and their family members. Wreckage was found in 1989.
- 22 October 1987: a Soviet Air Forces An-26 was shot down near Jalalabad Airport; all eight people on board died.
- 21 December 1987: A Soviet Air Force An-26 flying from Kabul to Bagram was shot down by a Stinger missile shortly after takeoff. The no. 1 engine was hit and shrapnel punctured the fuel tank. Smoke entered the cabin. Five of the six crew members bailed out safely, however the pilot jumped out at an altitude too low to open the parachute and did not survive.
- 10 April 1988: an Afghan Air Force An-26 was shot down near Maymana; all 29 people on board died.
- 20 April 1988: a Soviet Air Forces An-26 (MSN 11808) crashed shortly after takeoff from Chkalovsky Air Base when the right engine failed; all six people on board died.
- 27 April 1988: a Cuban Air Force An-26 T-237 was accidentally shot down by Cuban troops stationed at Techamutete, Angola; all 29 people on board died.
- 24 June 1988: a Soviet Air Forces An-26 was shot down by Mujahideen rebels after takeoff from Kabul International Airport; all five people on board died.
- 19 November 1988: an Afghan Air Force An-26 was shot down by the Pakistan Air Force near Parachinar; all 30 people on board died. Afghan officials said the plane had crossed the border after suffering mechanical problems while Pakistani officials said it had failed to identify itself.
- 10 December 1988: an Ariana Afghan Airlines An-26 was shot down over Pakistan by the Pakistan Air Force; all 25 people on board died.
- 10 March 1989: a National Air Force of Angola An-26 crashed at Cazombo; all five people on board died.
- 18 June 1989: an Ariana Afghan Airlines An-26 (YA-BAK) crash landed on a hill near Zabol after the ramp was opened in flight; six of the 39 people on boarddied.
- 19 July 1989: an Aeroflot An-26 (CCCP-26685) was on an ice observation flight over the East Siberian Sea to guide ships when it crashed at Cape Kibera after the left wing hit a cliff during a turn that was too close to the shore; all 10 on board died.
- 23 July 1989: a National Air Force of Angola An-26 was shot down by UNITA rebels near Chana; 42 of the 48 people on board died.
- 8 September 1989: a Cuban Air and Air Defense Force An-26 (MSN 3805) crashed into the sea near Playa de Baracoa during a nighttime exercise; seven of the eight people on board died.
- 26 October 1989: a Soviet Air Forces An-26 flew into a mountain in bad weather near Petropavlovsk-Kamchatsky; all 37 people on board died.

=== 1990s ===
- 1990s: Soviet Air Force An-26 01 red burned out on the ground at Orenburg Air Base following an APU fire.
- mid 1990s: Russian Air Force An-26 RA-47415 force-landed at Belgorod Airport and was withdrawn from use and cancelled from the Russian register in 2001. Although the aircraft was planned to become a cinema for the "Rolan Bykov Fund" in Belgorod, this was abandoned in 2004 because some of the radioactive sensors had not been removed.
- 23 March 1990: Cubana de Aviacion Flight 7406, an An-26 (CU-T1436), overran the runway at Antonio Maceo Airport following an aborted takeoff, killing four of 46 on board.
- 5 May 1990: a Soviet Air Forces An-26 crashed near Sparfayev island while on a flight from Magadan, killing all seven people on board.
- 22 February 1991: a National Air Force of Angola An-26 was shot down near Cazombo Airport, killing all 47 people on board.
- 15 August 1991: due to an air traffic controller's mistaken direction a Soviet Air Forces An-26 hit a mountain after take-off from Burevestnik Airport, killing all nine people on board.
- 27 February 1992: German Air Force An-26 "52+10" crashed after a hard landing. None of the crew members was injured.
- 8 April 1992: Yasir Arafat's An-26 crashed during a sandstorm. Of the 13 on board, both pilots and an engineer were killed.
- 23 April 1993: A MIAT Mongolian Airlines An-26 (BNMAU-14102) struck the side of Marz Mountain, Zavkhan Province, Mongolia while descending for Ölgii, killing all 32 on board.
- 17 June 1993: A Tajikistan Airlines An-26 (26035) stalled, spun down and crashed into a hillside 22 mi north of Tbilisi, Georgia, after encountering severe turbulence, killing all 33 on board.
- 26 December 1993: A Kuban Airlines An-26 (RA-26141) operating as Flight 5719 stalled and crashed upside down while landing at Leninakan Airport due to overloading, killing 35 of 36 on board.
- 13 July 1994: A Russian Air Force An-26 was stolen from Kubinka AFB by an engineer planning to commit suicide. He circled Lyakhovo at 300–2000 feet until the aircraft ran out of fuel and crashed, killing him.
- 31 July 1994: An Air Ukraine An-26B (UR-26207), operating on behalf of the UN, was reportedly shot down and crashed near Saborsko, Croatia, killing all 7 people on board.
- 16 January 1995: An Angolan Air Force An-26 was downed by rebel forces in the north of the country, killing all six occupants.
- 16 March 1995: A Central Region Airlines An-26B (RA-26084) struck a hill and crashed near Ossora Airport while on approach due to crew errors, killing nine of 10 on board.
- 31 August 1995: a Malian Air Force An-26 (TZ-347) flew into a mountain near Thessaloniki Airport in bad weather, killing all six people on board.
- 17 December 1995: Terrorist Kim Davy alias Niels Holck from Denmark dropped several tonnes of lethal weapons, ammunition, explosives and triggers by An-26 in Purulia district of West Bengal State of India. The plane was forced to land in Bombay, where his accomplices were arrested.
- 1997: Sudan Air Force An-26 7711 force-landed at Gogrial Airport after it was struck by SPLA ground fire.
- 2 September 1998: A Permtransavia An-26 (RA-20628) operating for Prestavia, crashed near Malanje Airport, Angola, after the pilot reported an engine fire, killing all 24 on board; the wreckage was found in 2003. Some reports stated that the aircraft was shot down by UNITA forces.
- 21 January 1999: Nicaraguan Air Force An-26 152 crashed after getting too low on approach and striking a tree near Bluefields Airport, killing all 28 people on board.

=== 2000s ===
- 30 March 2000: an An-26 chartered from Ukrainian company Avialinii AAR crashed near Anuradhapura Airport while carrying Sri Lanka Army troops, killing all 40 on board. The cause of the accident is unclear.
- 12 August 2000: a STAER airlines An-26 crashed near Tshikapa while trying to return to Kinshasa Airport, killing all 27 on board.
- 31 October 2000: an ACA-Ancargo An-26 (D2-FDI) crashed 20 minutes after take-off from Saurimo Airport, killing all 49 people on board. UNITA rebels say they shot it down.
- 4 April 2001: a Sudanese Air Force An-26 crashed on take-off in a sandstorm from Adar Yel, killing the deputy defence minister and 13 high-ranking officers. Another 16 passengers survived.
- 21 February 2002: a Russian Navy An-26 crashed after striking treetops while on final approach to Lakhta air base, killing 17 of the 20 people on board.
- 29 November 2003: a Congolese Air Force An-26 9T-TAD crashed during takeoff due to a burst tyre, killing 20 of the 24 people on board and 13 people on the ground.
- 5 May 2005: a chartered Aeroworld An-26 (EK-26060) crashed shortly after take-off from Kisangani Bangoka International Airport, killing 10 of the 11 people on board.
- 9 August 2005: a Yemeni Air Force An-26 crashed in Mukalla, killing one of its occupants and injuring 22 others.
- 5 September 2005: A Kavatshi Airlines An-26B (ER-AZT) operating on a non-scheduled passenger flight struck a tree and crashed on approach to Isiro Airport in Matari, killing all 11 people on board.
- 9 September 2005: An Air Kasai An-26B (9Q-CFD) operating on a non-scheduled passenger flight crashed 50 km (31 miles) north of Brazzaville, killing all 13 people on board.
- 11 February 2006: a Sudanese Air Force An-26 crashed into a building upon landing at Aweil, South Sudan after the front tyre burst, killing all 20 people on board.
- 9 January 2007: An AerianTur-M Antonov An-26 (ER-26068) crashed while attempting to land at the U.S. military base in Balad, Iraq, killing 34 of 35 on board. Although the aircraft crashed due to fog, some eyewitness and sources state that the aircraft was shot down by a missile.
- 4 October 2007: An Africa One An-26 (9Q-COS) crashed into the Kinshasa neighbourhood of Kimbaseke just after takeoff. 21 out of 22 people on board and 28 people on the ground died. Initial reports indicate a lost propeller.
- 8 April 2008: A Vietnam People's Air Force An-26 crashed in a field in the Thanh Trì district, killing all five on board.

=== 2010s ===
- 18 March 2010: An Exin An-26B (SP-FDO) made an emergency landing on the Lake Ülemiste, close to Lennart Meri Tallinn Airport. None of the six crew members was injured. Initial reports indicated failure of one of the turboprop power plants.
- 25 August 2010: An Exin An-26B (SP-FDP) rejected takeoff from Tallinn's runway 08 at high speed when the gear collapsed or retracted during the takeoff roll. The airplane skidded to a stop on its belly, no injuries occurred.
- 6 June 2011: Solenta Aviation Flight 122A, an An-26 (TR-LII), crashed in the sea near Libreville, Gabon, during an attempted go-around following hydraulic problems. Four people on board were rescued and transported to a local hospital, but were not seriously injured. The aircraft was operating on behalf of DHL.
- 24 November 2011: A Yemeni Air Force An-26 crashed outside Sanaa due to technical problems. 15 crew members and passengers died.
- 21 November 2012: a Yemeni Air Force An-26 crashed close to Sanaa International Airport, killing all 10 people on board.
- 19 August 2012: An Alfa Airlines An-26-100 (ST-ARL) struck a mountain during its second approach to the Talodi airfield in South Kordofan, Sudan. All 26 passengers on board and six crew members died.
- 17 December 2012: A Amazon Sky An-2, OB-1887-P, crashed in mountainous terrain in Peru due to icing, killing all 4 on board.
- 21 February 2014: A Libyan Air Cargo An-26 (5A-DOW), operating an ambulance flight, crashed in a farm near Grombalia, 60 km short of Tunis-Carthage Airport, after one of its engines caught fire. The accident resulted in the death of all its 11 occupants: six crew members, two doctors and three patients.
- 14 July 2014: Ukraine Air Force An-26 19 blue flying at 6,500 m (21,300 ft) was shot down and crashed near Izvaryne, Ukraine, killing two of six on board. (confirmed to be shot using Buk missile system). U.S. officials would later say evidence suggested the aircraft had been fired on from inside Russian territory
- 18 January 2015: Syrian Air Force An-26 YK-AND crashed while attempting to land at the besieged Abu al-Duhur military airport in Idlib Governorate, Syria, killing all 30 on board.
- 9 March 2016: A True Aviation An-26B (S2-AGZ) crashed into the Bay of Bengal near Cox's Bazar while attempting to return to Cox's Bazar Airport following an engine failure, killing three of four on board.
- 30 April 2016: A Sudan Air Force An-26 crashed during a landing attempt at Al-Ubayyid. All five crew members died.
- 20 March 2017: A South Supreme Airlines An-26B (S9-TLZ) was destroyed by fire at Wau Airport, South Sudan, after crashing into a fire truck during landing; 37 of the 45 on board the aircraft were injured.
- 29 April 2017: Aerogaviota Flight FAR1436, an An-26 (CU-T1406), crashed in the Loma de la Pimienta Mountains near Las Terrazas, Cuba, killing all eight on board. The aircraft was operating on behalf of the Cuban Air Force.
- 30 May 2017: Russian Aerospace Forces An-26 RF-36160 crashed at Balashov Airfield during a training flight after descending too soon, killing one of six on board.
- 28 August 2017: A Coco Aviation An-26B (EK-26006) overran the runway at Maban Airstrip and was destroyed by the consequent fire. The crew survived.
- 14 October 2017: A Valan Air An-26 (ER-AVB) chartered by the French Military crashed shortly before landing at Abidjan, the Ivory Coast capital. Four people were killed and six were injured.
- 6 March 2018: Russian Aerospace Forces An-26 RF-92955 crashed at Khmeimim Air Base. All 33 passengers and six crew died in the incident.
- 20 December 2018: A Gomair An-26 (9S-AGB) crashed 19 nautical miles short of Kinshasa with 7 or 8 people on board. The aircraft was found more than 24 hours later by a local. The aircraft was carrying election materials on behalf of the Central Electoral National Independent Commission (CENI).
- 24 December 2018: Congolese Air Force An-26 9T-TAB crashed as it overshot the runway at Beni Airport in North Kivu province. The aircraft was reportedly transporting troops, and the crash resulted in 38 people being taken to hospital.

=== 2020s ===
- 22 August 2020: A South West Aviation An-26 (EX-126) lost power during take-off at Juba Airport in South Sudan and crashed into Hai Referendum residential area on the outskirts of the airport. Eight of the nine occupants on board killed alongside nine on the ground.
- 25 September 2020: Ukraine Air Force An-26 76 yellow with cadets of the Ivan Kozhedub National Air Force University crashed and immediately caught fire in Ukraine's Kharkiv Oblast. There were 27 people on board; 25 were killed immediately and one died in hospital; the sole survivor was seriously injured.
- 13 March 2021: A Kazakh Border Guards An-26 crashed short of the runway while attempting to land at Almaty Airport killing four of the six occupants on board.
- 6 July 2021: A Petropavlovsk-Kamchatsky Air An-26, crashed on a cliff in the vicinity of Palana, killing all 22 passengers and six crew members. Most of the debris slid down into the Okhotsk Sea.
- 22 September 2021: a technical flight that disappeared from flight radars 38 km from Khabarovsk crashed, killing all six members of the crew.
- 2 November 2021: Optimum Aviation Antonov An-26, registered as TR-NGT, crashed near the White Nile just after take-off from Juba International Airport, South Sudan. All five crew were killed.
- 24 February 2022: 2022 Russian invasion of Ukraine: Ukrainian Air Force An-26 59 blue was shot down near Zhukivtsi by Russian fire. Five of the fourteen people on board were killed.
- 24 February 2022: Russian Aerospace Forces An-26 RF-36074 crashed near Voronezh. All crew reported dead.
- 27 February 2022: An Antonov Airlines An-26-100 (UR-13395) was confirmed to be destroyed in Hostomel, Kyiv during the attack.
- 22 April 2022: A Constanta Airlines An-26B-100 (UR-UZB) crashed after it struck power lines over Mykhailivka in the Zaporizhzhia Oblast, killing one of three crew.
- 14 June 2024: Utair Flight 9706, an Antonov An-26-100, crash-landed 1 km from Utrenny Airport in bad weather injuring 3 of the 41 on board.
- 25 February 2025: A Sudanese Air Force Antonov An-26 crashed in a residential area shortly after takeoff from Wadi Seidna Air Base. All 17 people on board were killed, as well as 29 people on the ground.
- 25 September 2025: Two Russian Aerospace Forces Antonov An-26, based in Crimea, hit by Ukrainian drones and, according to Ukrainian reporting, destroyed.
- 31 March 2026: A Russian Air Force Antonov An-26 crashed into a cliff in Crimea, killing 30 people.

== Aircraft on display ==
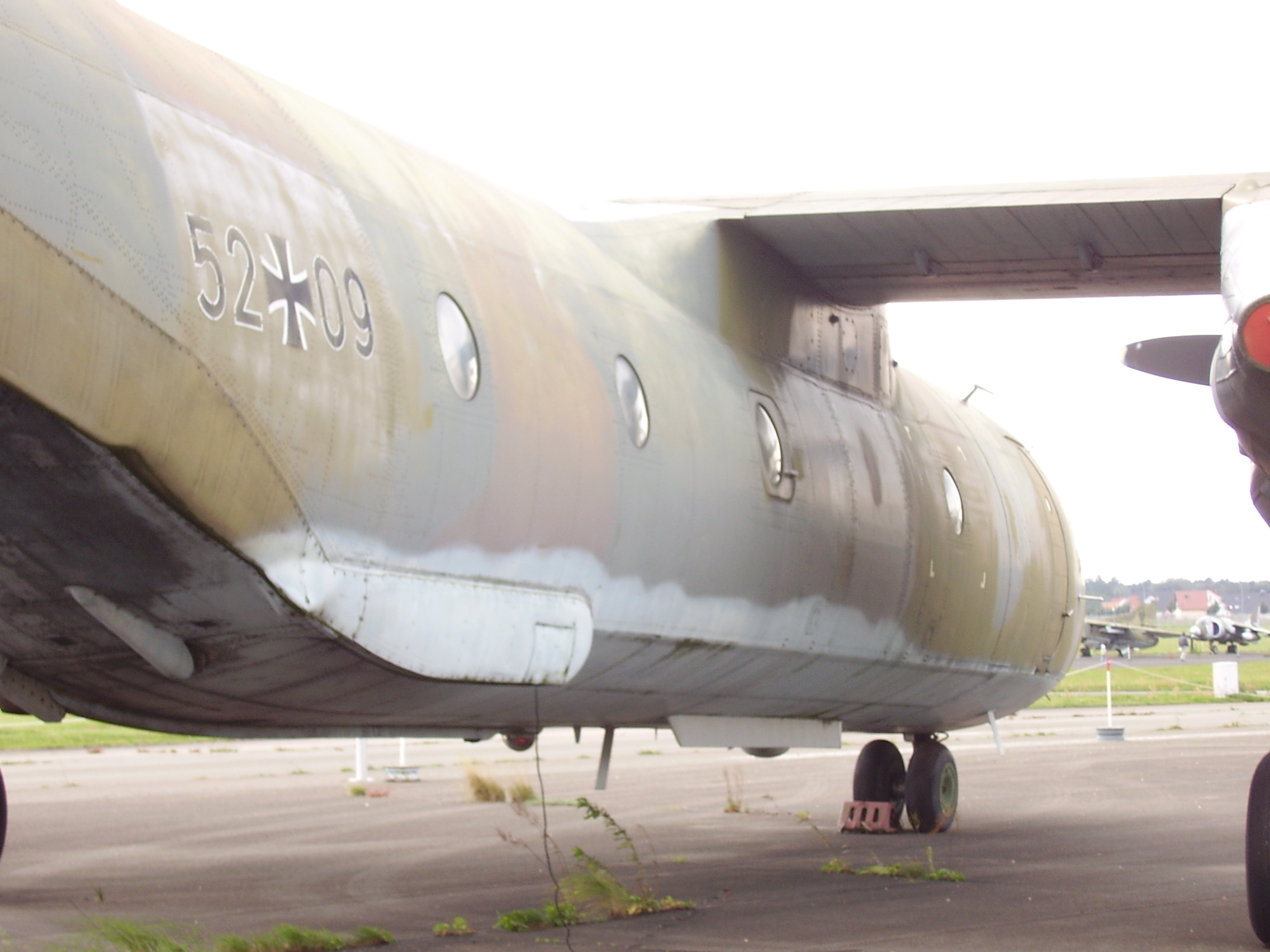
An-26 "52+09" at Berlin-Gatow

- Germany
  - An-26, tail number "52+04", former East German "375", is exhibited at Technikmuseum Speyer
  - An-26, tail number "52+05", former East German "376" is exhibited at Schwäbisches Bauern- und Technik-Museum, Eschach-Seifertshofen
  - An-26, tail number "52+08", former East German "368" is exhibited at Flugausstellung Hermeskeil
  - An-26SM, tail number "52+09", former East German "369", is exhibited at Militärhistorisches Museum Flugplatz Berlin-Gatow
- Poland
  - An-26, tail number "1509" is exhibited in the Polish Aviation Museum in Kraków

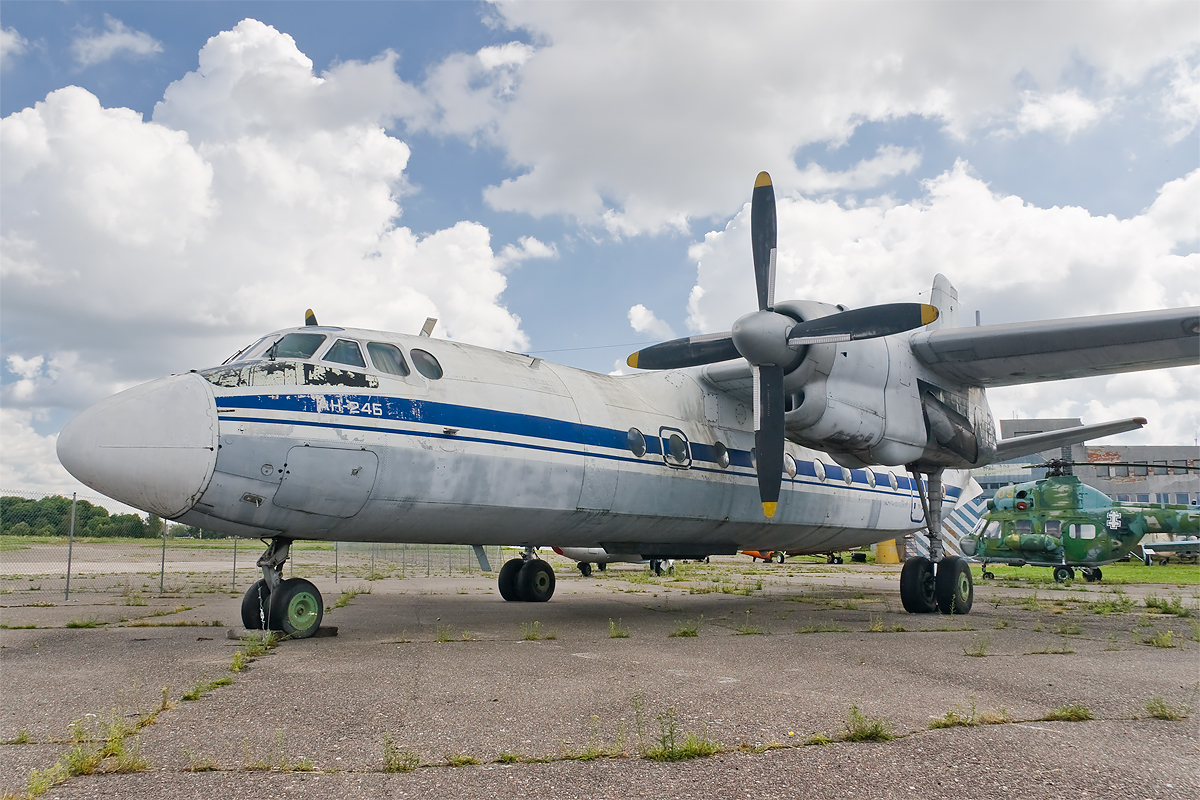
Former Lithuanian Air Force An-26B in early 1990s paintscheme, Kaunas Aleksotas (EYKS) airfield

- An-26, tail number "1602" is exhibited in the Polish Army Museum in Warsaw.
- Lithuania
  - An-26B, civilian tail number "16444", military tail number "06", former Aeroflot, from 1991 – Lithuanian Airlines, afterwards – Lithuanian Air Force, exhibited at Lithuanian Aviation Museum, S. Darius and S. Girėnas (Aleksotas) airfield (EYKS), Kaunas.
- Pakistan
  - A2-26, Afghan Air Force, is exhibited at PAF Museum, Karachi
- Russia
  - An-26 is displayed in Balashov town
  - An-26, tail number RA-26610, is displayed in place of former Nadezhda airport, in Norilsk.
  - An-26, tail number CCCP-26608, is displayed at the entrance to Salekhard airport (SLY / USDD).
- Ukraine
  - An-26, tail number UR-26194, is exhibited on the street side at Liubomyra Huzara Ave, 1, in front of National Aviation University in Kyiv.

== Specifications ==
Data from Jane's All The World's Aircraft 1988–89

General characteristics

- Crew: five (two pilots, one radio operator, one flight engineer, one navigator)
- Capacity: 40 passengers / 5,500 kg (12,100 lb)
- Length: 23.8 m (78 ft 1 in)
- Wingspan: 29.3 m (96 ft 2 in)
- Height: 8.58 m (28 ft 2 in)
- Wing area: 74.98 m^{2} (807.1 sq ft)
- Aspect ratio: 11.7:1
- Empty weight: 15,020 kg (33,113 lb)
- Max takeoff weight: 24,000 kg (52,911 lb)
- Powerplant: 2 × Progress AI-24VT Turboprop engines, 2,103 kW (2,820 hp) each
- Powerplant: 1 × Tumansky Ru19A-300 Turbojet booster / APU, 7.85 kN (1,760 lbf) thrust
- Propellers: 4-bladed Constant speed metal bladed propellers, 3.90 m (12 ft 10 in) diameter

Performance

- Cruise speed: 440 km/h (270 mph, 240 kn)
- Range: 2,500 km (1,600 mi, 1,300 nmi) with maximum fuel
- Range with max payload: 1,100 km (680 mi)
- Service ceiling: 7,500 m (24,600 ft)
- Rate of climb: 8 m/s (1,600 ft/min)

== See also ==
- Military transport aircraft

Related development

- Antonov An-24
- Antonov An-32
- Xian Y-7
- Xian MA60

Aircraft of comparable role, configuration, and era

- Aeritalia G.222
- Transall C-160
- Fokker F27 Friendship

Related lists

- List of military aircraft of the Soviet Union and the CIS
