= 2012 Amazon Sky An-26 crash =

Aviation incident in Peru

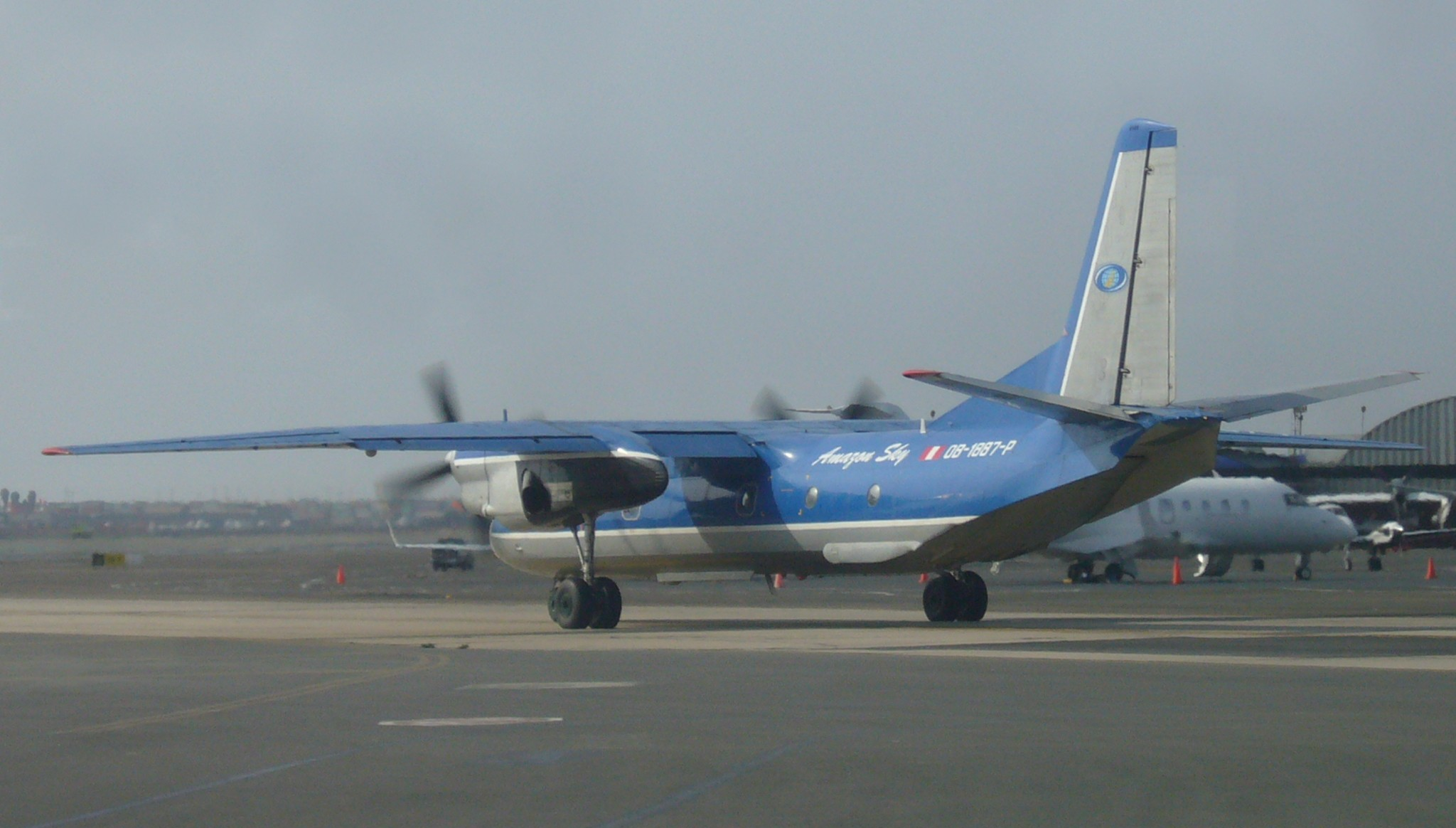
- The Amazon Sky Antonov An-26 involved in the accident

Accident
- Date: 17 December 2012
- Summary: Crashed due to icing and Pilot error
- Site: Yauyos Province, Peru; 12°8′25.05″S 75°42′54.97″W

Aircraft
- Aircraft type: Antonov An-26
- Operator: Amazon Sky
- Registration: OB-1887-P
- Flight origin: Jorge Chávez International Airport, Lima, Peru
- Destination: Las Malvinas Airport, Cuzco Province, Peru
- Crew: 4
- Fatalities: 4
- Survivors: 0

On 17 December 2012, an Antonov AN-26 cargo aircraft operated by Amazon Sky was flying from Jorge Chávez International Airport in Lima to Las Malvinas Airport in the Cuzco Province, Peru with 4 crew when it experienced a dual engine failure due to icing and crashed into mountainous terrain in the Tomas District of Yauyos Province, Peru, killing all occupants.

== Aircraft & Crew ==
The aircraft was a twin-turboprop Antonov An-26 built in 1978. It was delivered to Amazon Sky around December 2006 when was registered UR-VIG and re-registered OB-1887-P in April 2008.

The captain of the flight had 13,145 hours total flight experience, of which 3,025 hours were in Antonov An-24 or An-26 aircraft. The first officer had 1,373 hours total, of which 20 hours were in the Antonov aircraft. The flight engineer had 2,185 hours total, all in the Antonov An-26. The navigator had a total of 657 hours experience, of which 643 were in the An-26.

== Accident ==
The aircraft had been flying from Peru's capital of Lima to an airfield of the Argentinian company Pluspetrol in the Cusco Region and was carrying a crew of 4 people. The accident occurred at about 15:42 local time as the aircraft firstly touched a mountain peak, then crashed in steep terrain. The site of the accident was only found the day after the crash.

== Investigation ==
The investigation commission found that failure of both engines due to ice had caused the crash. The crew had failed to properly use the anti-icing.

The report of the investigation commission also found other contributory factors all focused on the crew's mistakes which are specifically poor planning and lack of an appropriate procedure in the checklist (Failure and re-ignition of two engines) also bad weather condition is contributed.
