= Eleron Airlines =

Ukrainian cargo airline

IATA	ICAO	Call sign
WD	VVA	LOAD SHARK
- Founded: 2017
- Commenced operations: February 2019
- Focus cities: Lviv Danylo Halytskyi International Airport; Rivne International Airport
- Fleet size: 1
- Destinations: 1
- Headquarters: Kyiv, Ukraine

Eleron Airlines was a Ukrainian cargo airline headquartered in Kyiv.

== Destinations ==
Eleron Airlines offers chartered and scheduled cargo flights, as well as wet-leasing services. As of 2021, they operated mainly throughout Europe from their base in Lviv with few additional intercontinental services, e. g. to Hong Kong.

== Fleet ==
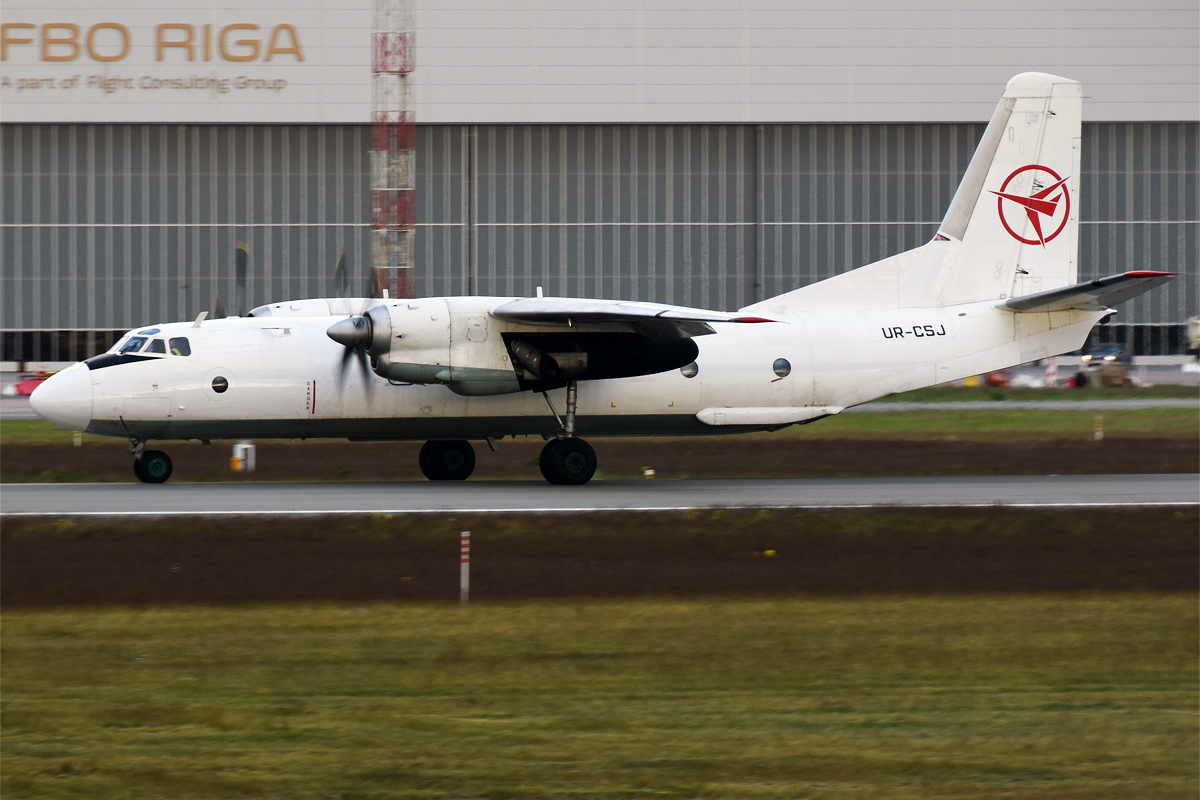
Eleron Airlines Antonov An-26

As of May 2022, the Eleron Airlines fleet consists of the following aircraft:

Eleron Airlines fleet
Aircraft	In service	Orders	Notes
Antonov An-26	2	—	
Total	2	—	

== See also ==
- List of airlines of Ukraine
