= Transportes Aéreos Cielos Andinos =

IATA	ICAO	Call sign
—	NDN	ANDINOS
- Founded: 2007
- Hubs: Jorge Chávez International Airport
- Fleet size: 2
- Destinations: 3
- Headquarters: Avenida Bolívar 1923, Pueblo Libre, Lima 21, Peru
- Key people: Víctor Hugo Galván Zevallos (CEO, founder)
- Website: http://www.cielosandinos.com.pe

Transportes Aéreos Cielos Andinos, normally referred to as Cielos Andinos, is an airline based in Lima, Peru. Its main base is Jorge Chávez International Airport in Lima. It began domestic operations on July 9, 2007, to Andahuaylas. Future destinations include Cajamarca, Ayacucho, Cusco, Puerto Maldonado, Chimbote and Arequipa.

This airline appears to no longer be in business. Its website has been shut down.

== Destinations ==
- Andahuaylas (Andahuaylas Airport)
- Ayacucho (Coronel FAP Alfredo Mendívil Duarte Airport)
- Lima (Jorge Chávez International Airport)

=== Future destinations ===
- Arequipa (Rodríguez Ballón International Airport)
- Cajamarca (Mayor General FAP Armando Revoredo Iglesias Airport)
- Cusco (Alejandro Velasco Astete International Airport)
- Puerto Maldonado (Padre Aldamiz International Airport)
- Chimbote

== Fleet ==
Aircraft	Capacity	No. of Aircraft	Notes
Antonov An-24RV	44	2 (1 stored)	
Antonov An-26	44	2 (stored)	
Total	n/a	4	1 active, 3 stored
