= RAF-Avia =

Airline of Latvia

| IATA | ICAO | Call sign |
|---|---|---|
| MT | MTL | MITAVIA |
- Founded: 1990; 36 years ago
- Commenced operations: 18 July 1991; 35 years ago
- Hubs: Riga International Airport
- Fleet size: 2
- Destinations: 18
- Parent company: RAF Avia group
- Headquarters: Riga, Latvia
- Website: www.rafavia.aero

RAF-Avia is a Latvian airline headquartered in Riga and based at Riga International Airport.

== History ==
The airline was established in 1990 with the purpose of delivering parts and manufacturing materials for the Riga Autobus Factory (RAF), with the factory buying at least 4 planes. It started operations in 1991. In 1994, RAF-Avia began to move into the commercial charter sector. In 1996, it became a private limited company. It is 100% owned by the RAF-Avia group.

In August 2016, the airline stationed two aircraft at Frankfurt Hahn Airport to operate ad hoc charter flights.

== Destinations ==
RAF-Avia operates cargo services for TNT, DHL and others, as well as transport for the military and the United Nations and passenger charters. In late 2015 RAF-Avia announced that it is considering starting regular passenger flights in 2016.

== Fleet ==
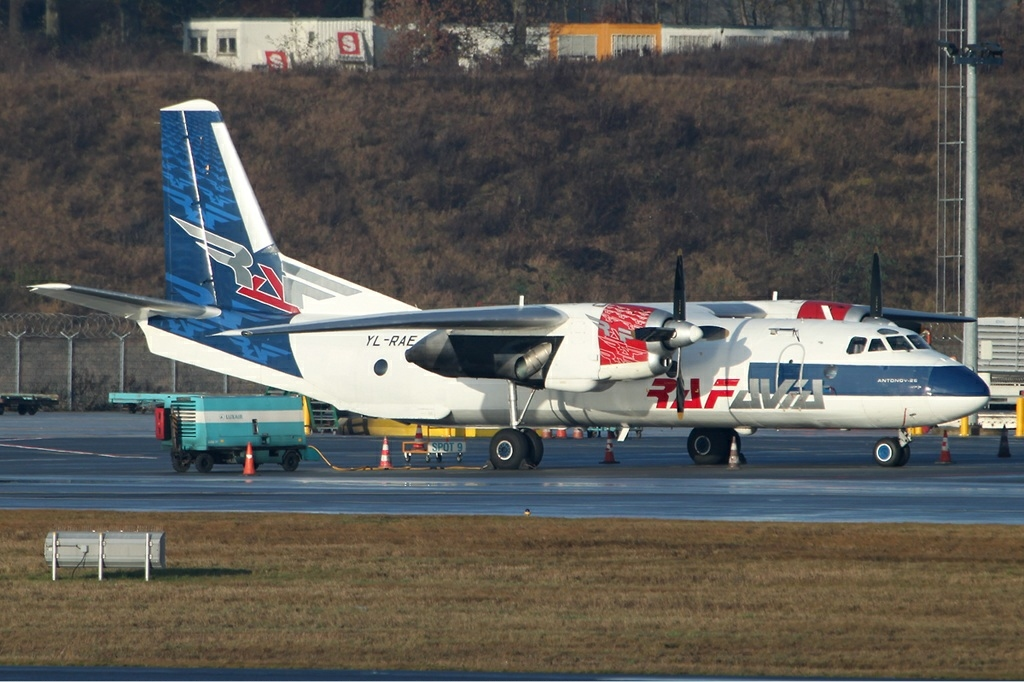
RAF-Avia Antonov An-26

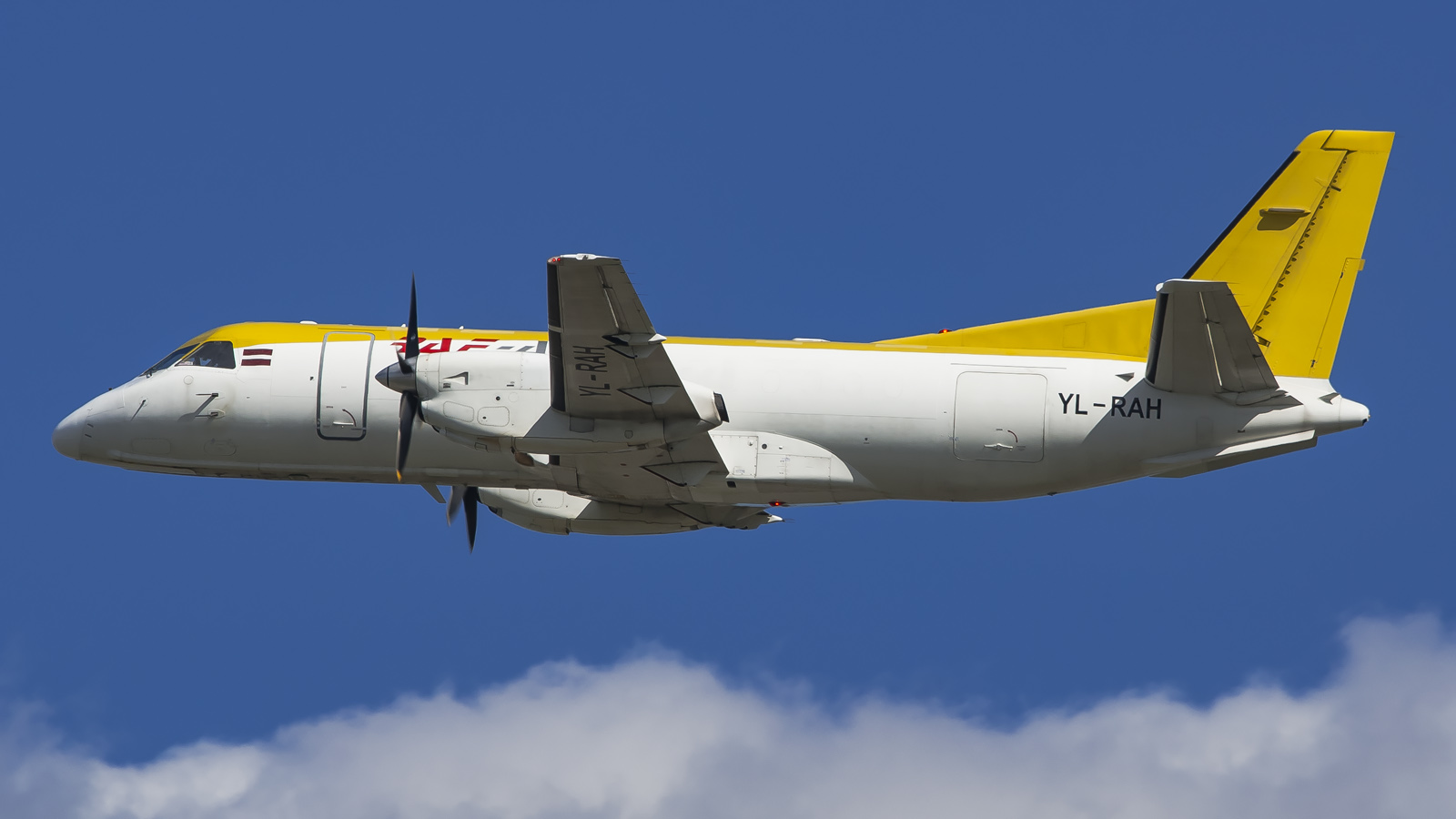
RAF-Avia Saab 340AF

=== Current fleet ===
As of July 2026, RAF-Avia operates the following aircraft:

Aero K fleet
| Aircraft | In service | Orders | Passengers | Notes |
|---|---|---|---|---|
| Saab 340 | 2 | — | | |
| Total | 2 | — | | |

=== Former fleet ===
As of August 2025, RAF-Avia operated 1 ATR 72-200F and 2 Saab 340.

The RAF-Avia fleet previously included the following aircraft (as of September 2015):

- 1 further Antonov An-26

== Incidents and accidents ==
- On 29 October 2014, an RAF-Avia An-26 was guided to Stansted Airport by RAF fighter jets after losing communication with air traffic controllers over southern England.
- On 7 January 2019, the SAAB 340B YL-RAF on a positioning flight from Riga to Savonlinna (EFSA, FI) skidded off the runway during landing and was stuck in snow. While there were no injuries, there was damage to the aircraft at both propellers, landing lights and tyres.
- On April 26, 2021, an RAF-Avia AN-26 flying from Helsinki to St. Petersburg made an emergency landing at Pulkovo Airport due to a failure of the left engine. The landing was made safely and without casualties.
- On February 6, 2024, the SAAB 340A YL-RAL, on wet-lease for Aeroitalia, suffered a failure of the left-hand engine during the initial climb out of Rome Fiumicino. The aircraft returned safely to Rome after a few minutes.
