= Stadnitsa =

Stadnitsa Стадница
- Selo
- Location within Voronezh Oblast Location within Russia
- Coordinates: 51°48′N 38°45′E
- Country: Russia
- Region: Voronezh Oblast
- District: Semiluksky District
- Time zone: UTC+3:00

Stadnitsa (Russian: Стадница) is a rural locality (a selo) and the administrative center of Stadnitskoye Rural Settlement, Semiluksky District, Voronezh Oblast, Russia. The population was 456 as of 2010. There are 10 streets.

== Geography ==
Stadnitsa is located on the right bank of the Serebryanka River, 44 km northwest of Semiluki (the district's administrative centre) by road. Kondrashyovka is the nearest rural locality.
