= Mordovia Airlines =

IATA	ICAO	Call sign
–	–	–
- Founded: 1992
- Commenced operations: 1992
- Ceased operations: 13 February 2013
- Destinations: See Destinations below
- Headquarters: Saransk, Mordovia, Russia

Saransk Air Enterprise (Saranskoe aviapredpriatie) was an airline based in Saransk, Mordovia, Russia. It operated regional scheduled and charter passenger services, as well as aerial work.

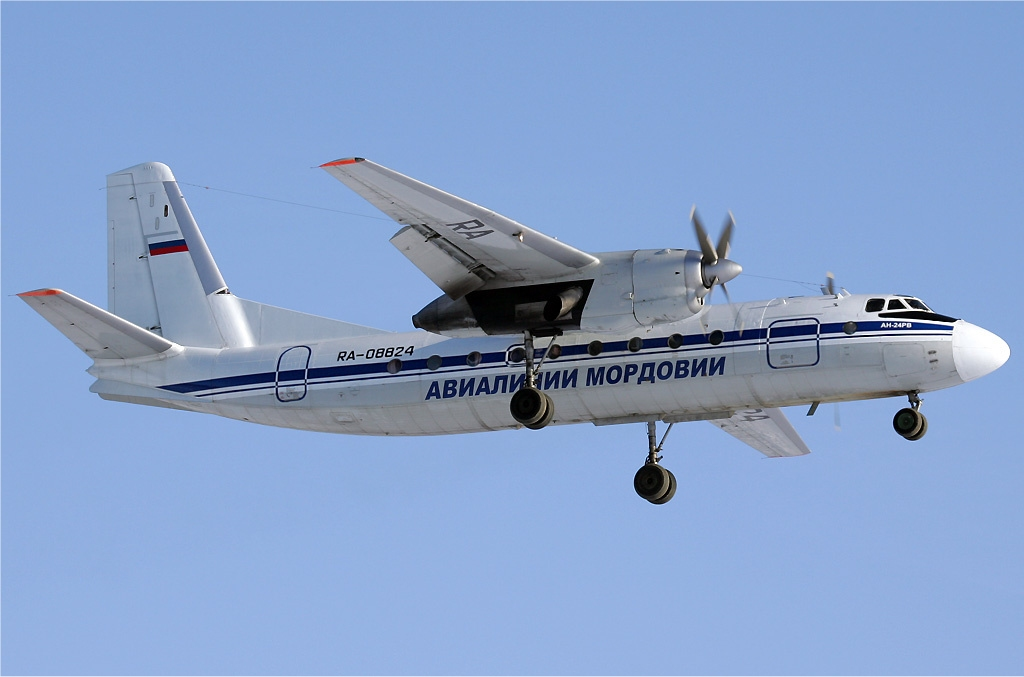
Antonov An-24

== History and route network ==
In 1965, within the framework of the Volga Civil Aviation Directorate of the USSR Ministry of Civil Aviation, the Saransk United Aviation Detachment was created. The enterprise was created on the basis of a separate squadron An-2 of the Penza air squadron.

In January 1980, its own flight division was formed on the basis of An-24 aircraft, and an artificial B-class runway was put into operation. The detachment operated aircraft of the An-2, An-24, An-26 types, and the detachment was also involved in the operation of the Saransk airport. In Soviet times, Saransk operated flights to Volgograd, Voronezh, Gorky, Ivanovo, Yoshkar-Ola, Kazan, Kiev, Krasnodar, Kuibyshev, Leningrad, Moscow. Mineralnye Vody, Perm, Rostov-on-Don, Saratov, Sverdlovsk, Simferopol, Sochi, Tambov, Cheboksary and other cities of the USSR.

The airline was established and started operations in 1992. It was formerly the Aeroflot Saransk Division.

After the collapse of Aeroflot in 1993, Saransk OJSC was transformed into a federal state unitary enterprise (FSUE).

In 2006, after the bankruptcy of the Saransk United Aviation Squadron, the Open Joint Stock Company Mordovia Airlines was created on its basis, 100% of the shares of which belonged to the Republic of Mordovia represented by the State Autonomous Institution of the RM “Property Fund”.

In 2008, the aircraft of the airline carried 17.21 thousand passengers, in 2010 - 21 thousand, in 2011 - 15 thousand

In the 2011 summer season, the airline operated flights to Sochi. Also, the aircraft of the airline performed charter flights to various cities of Russia, and were engaged in the transportation of sports teams, including FC Mordovia Saransk.

The operator's certificate of the air carrier was suspended since 21 October 2011 on the basis of the Federal Air Transport Agency's act dated 09/28/2011, drawn up based on the results of an audit that revealed a deterioration in production performance and financial and economic condition, but a few days later the Federal Air Transport Agency for unspecified reasons restored this certificate.

In 2012, the airline considered the possibility of replenishing the fleet with An-140 aircraft.

According to the official website of the airline, until February 2013 there were regular flights to Moscow Domodedovo Airport twice a day on Mondays and Fridays, and one flight on Tuesdays, Wednesdays and Thursdays. To perform these flights, instead of the actual aircraft fleet, since 2012, the CRJ-100 and CRJ-200 aircraft of RusLine have been involved, the flights were operated jointly.

On 12 February 2013, the Federal Air Transport Agency decided to cancel the airline's operator certificate due to the deterioration of flight safety performance and the failure of the management of Mordovia Airlines to take effective measures to eliminate the repeatedly noted inconsistencies with certification requirements. In the spring of 2013, the airline made its last flight.

On 13 February 2013 Russian aviation authorities revoked AOC of the company due to safety issues as a number of violations of pilots' worktime limits were revealed.

== Destinations ==
Russia

- Moscow – Domodedovo International Airport
- Saransk – Saransk Airport base
- Sochi – Adler-Sochi International Airport seasonal

== Fleet ==
As of November 2012 the Saransk Air Enterprise fleet included:

- 5 Antonov An-24
- Bombardier CRJ100/Bombardier CRJ200 operated by RusLine
