= Las Malvinas Airport =

Airport in Peru

Las Malvinas/Echarate Airport
- IATA: VVN; ICAO: SPWT

Summary
- Airport type: Public
- Location: Northern Cusco Region
- Elevation AMSL: 1,252 ft / 382 m
- Coordinates: 11°51′00″S 72°56′25″W

Map
- Location of the airport in Peru

Runways
Direction	Length		Surface
Direction	m	ft	Surface
17/35	1,670	5,479	Asphalt
- Source: GCM Google Maps

Las Malvinas/Echarate Airport (IATA: VVN, ICAO: SPWT) is an airport serving the Las Malvinas natural gas plant in the Cusco Region of Peru. The runway is adjacent to the plant, and is the primary transport access to it. No towns are near the plant, which is on the Urubamba River. The plant processes natural gas from the Camisea gas fields and sends it along two pipelines for export and domestic use.

The Malvinas VOR-DME (Ident: MLV) and non-directional beacon (Ident MLV) are located on the field.

== See also ==
- Transport in Peru
- List of airports in Peru
