= List of defunct airlines of Democratic Republic of the Congo =

This is a list of defunct airlines of Democratic Republic of the Congo .

Airline	Image	IATA	ICAO	Callsign	Commenced operations	Ceased operations	Notes
Agefreco Air					1998	2007	
Agence et Messageries Aérienne du Zaïre		HK			1974	1979	
Air Africa		M8	MSC	AIR AFRICA	1991	1996	
Air Boyoma					2001	2009	Operated Antonov An-24, Antonov An-26
Air Congo					1961	1971	Renamed to Air Zaïre
AirDC					2008	2009	Later known as Korongo Airlines
Air Tropiques			TPQ		2001	2016	
Air Zaïre		QC	AZR		1971	1995	Zaire flag carrier and former Congo flag carrier, founded in 1961
Bazair					1996	1997	Operated HS Andover, Piper Aztec, Vickers Viscount
Blue Airlines			BUL	BLUE AIRLINES	1991	2020	Banned in EU. Operated Antonov An-28, Boeing 707, Boeing 727, Lockheed L-188A Electra
Bravo Air Congo		K6	BRV	BRAVO	2005	2007	
Business Aviation		4P	ABB	AFRICAN BUSINESS	1998	2007	
Business Cash Flow Aviation					1984	1991	Renamed to Blue Airlines. Operated Boeing 707
CAL - Congo Airlines		EO	ALX		1997	2000	Rebranded as HBA - Hewa Bora Airways
Cetraca Air Service			CER		2003	2014	Operated Antonov An-26, Let Turbolet
Cetraca Aviation Service			CER		2023	2024	Operated Let Turbolet. It was opened in 2023 after the original Cetraca Aviation closed in 2014
Cogeair					?	1973	Operated Curtiss C-46, de Havilland Heron
Compagnie Africaine d'Aviation			CAA		1992	2013	Banned in EU. Rebranded FlyCAA
Congo Airlines		EO	ALX	ALLCONGO	1994	1998	Renamed to Hewa Bora Airways
Congo Express		XZ	EXY	EXPRESSWAYS	2010	2015	
El Sam Airlift					2006	2009	Banned in EU. AOC revoked. Operated Antonov An-26
Express Cargo					1994	1995	Renamed to Express City. Operated Boeing 707
Express City					1996	1998	Renamed to Congo Airlines. Operated Boeing 707, BAC 1-11
Filair			FIL		1987	2015	Banned in EU. AOC revoked
Flight Express					2004	2009	Operated Antonov An-26
FlyCongo		EO	ALX	CONGO	2012	2013	
Flight Express					2004	2006	
Free Airlines					2006	2009	AOC revoked. Operated Let Turbolet
Great Lakes Business Company					2001	2009	AOC revoked. Operated Antonov An-8, Antonov An-12, Antonov An-32
Hewa Bora Airways		EO	ALX	ALLCONGO	1998	2011	Renamed to FlyCongo
Karibu Airways					2000s	2000s	Operated Let Turbolet
Katale Aero Transport					1978	1990s	Operated Boeing 707-320C, Bristol Britannia, Douglas DC-8
Katanga Express					2010	2012	AOC revoked. Banned in EU. Operated Dornier 328, Gulfstream IV
Kavatshi Airlines					2003	2010	
Kinshasa Airways			KNS	KINSHASA AIRWAYS	2002	2005	
Kivu Air					1997	2009	Banned in EU. AOC revoked. Operated CASA Aviocar, Douglas C-47, Dornier 228, Cessna Grand Caravan
Korongo Airlines		ZC	KGO	CONGO STAR	2009	2015	
LAC - SkyCongo		4V	LCG		2005	2006	Operated Convair 580
Lignes Aériennes Congolaises (LAC)		6V	LCG	CONGOLAISE	1997	2003	
Lignes Aériennes Congolaises		4V	LCG		2005	2013	
Malift Air			MLC		1995	2006	
MIBA Aviation					1994	2005	Operated BAe 125, Boeing 727
SBZ Cargo		ZM	SBZ		1976	1979	Renamed to Scibe Airlift. Operated Vickers Viscount, Lockheed L-100
Scibe Airlift		ZM	SBZ	SCIBE AIRLIFT	1979	1997	Established as SBZ Cargo
Services Air					1993	2015	Rebranded as Serve Air Cargo. Operated Antonov An-12, Antonov An-26
Shabair		S5	SHB	SHABAIR	1984	1997	Merged into Congo Airlines. Operated BAC 1-11, Boeing 727, Douglas DC-10, BN-2 Islander
Taxavia					1980	1998	Taken over by Business Aviation. Operated Cessna Titan, DHC-6 Twin Otter, Piper Navajo, Piper Seneca
TMK Air Commuter					1987	2011	
Trans Intair					2002	2003	Operated Vickers Viscount
Trans Service Airlift					1991	2006	Banned in EU. AOC revoked
Transair Cargo					1992	1998	Renamed to Trans Air Cargo Service. Operated Boeing 707, Bristol Britannia, Douglas DC-4, Douglas DC-6, Douglas DC-8
Transair Congo					1963	1966	Subsidiary of Transair Sweden. Operated Curtiss C-46, Douglas DC-6
Transport Aérien Congo (TAC)					1983	1983	Renamed to Transports Aériens Zairois (TAZ)
Transports Aériens Zairois (TAZ)					1983	1997	Renamed Air Kasaï. Operated Douglas C-47
Waltair					1983	2005	Operated Sud Caravelle, HS 748
Wimbi Dira Airways		9C	WDA	WIMBI DIRA	2003	2013	
Wolf Aviation					1980s	1980s	Operated Boeing 707
Zaïre Aero Service					1976	2006	Benned in EU. AOC revoked. Operated Carvair, Vickers Viscount
Zaire Airlines					1996	1998	To Hewa Bora Airways
Zaire Express					1994	1998	To Hewa Bora Airways

== See also ==
- List of airlines of the Democratic Republic of the Congo
- List of airports in the Democratic Republic of the Congo
