= List of airlines of the Democratic Republic of the Congo =

This is a list of airlines that have an air operator's certificate issued by the civil aviation authority of the Democratic Republic of the Congo, the Autorité de l'Aviation Civile. All of these airlines are banned in the EU.

Airline	IATA	ICAO	Callsign	Image	Hub airport(s)	Founded	Operation Type	Notes
Air Congo	4H	DRC	LEO PARC		N'djili Airport	2024	Scheduled carrier	
Air Kasai					N'Dolo Airport	1983	Charter	
Busy Bee Congo		RHT	YELLOW BEE		Goma International Airport	2007	Established in 2007, operates domestic charters.	
Compagnie Africaine d'Aviation	BU	DBP	AFRICAN		N'djili Airport	2013 (traceable to 1992)	Scheduled Carrier	
Congo Airways	8Z	COG	CONGO AIR		N'djili Airport	2014	Scheduled carrier	
Gomair					Goma International Airport	1996	Charter	
Kin Avia					N'Dolo Airport	2009	Charter	
Mont Gabaon Airlines					Goma International Airport	2024	Scheduled carrier	
Serve Air Cargo	S2	SRV	SERVAIR		N'djili Airport	1993	cargo	
Swala Aviation					Kavumu Airport	-	Charter	
Trans Air Cargo Service					N'djili Airport	(1994) 2004	Cargo	

== See also ==
- List of defunct airlines of the Democratic Republic of the Congo
- List of airlines
- List of air carriers banned in the European Union
- List of companies based in the Democratic Republic of the Congo
