= Blue Airlines =

Defunct airline of the Democratic Republic of the Congo

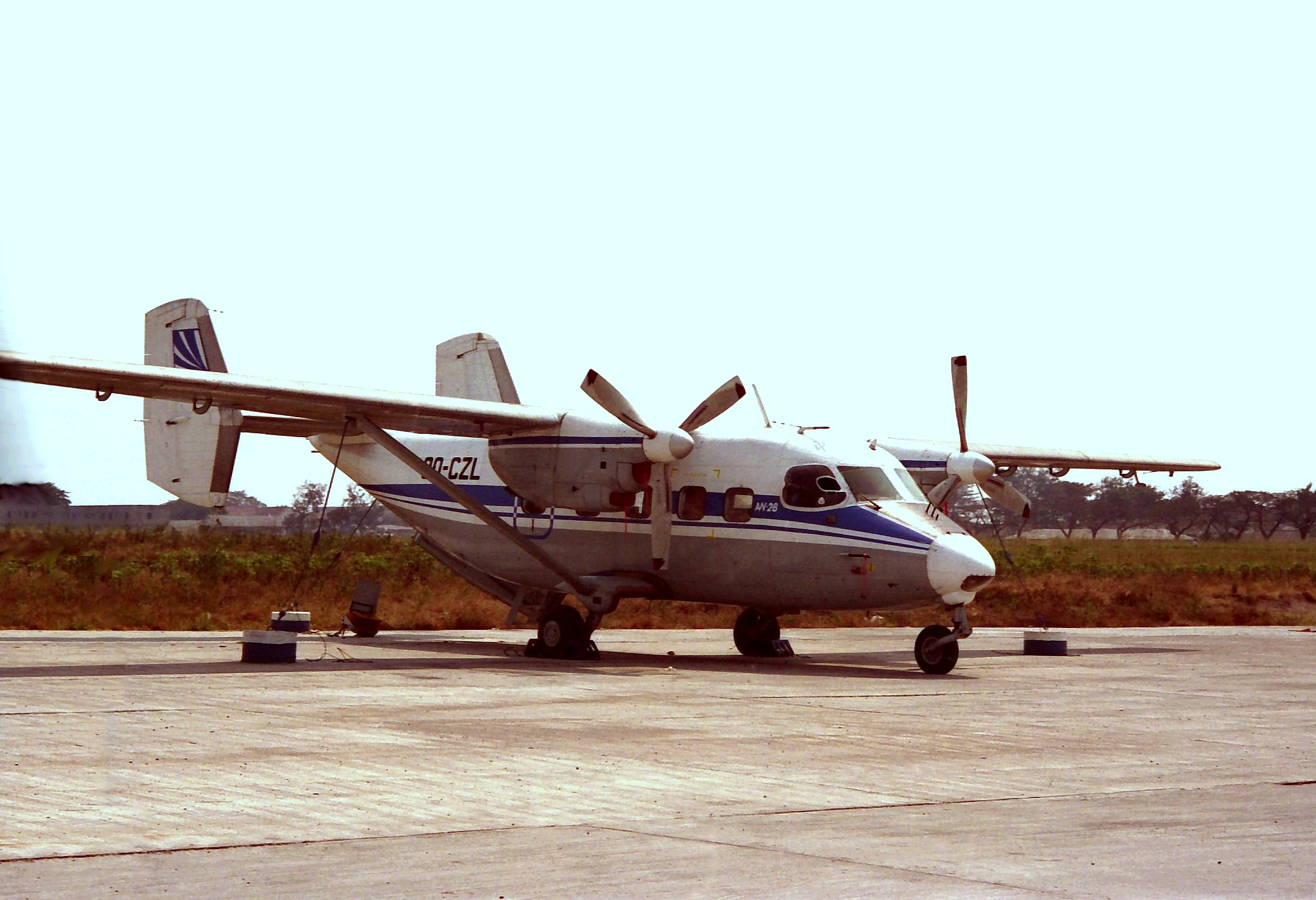
IATA	ICAO	Call sign
—	BLU	BLUE AIRLINES
- Founded: 1984
- Ceased operations: AOC invalid by 2008
- Hubs: N'djili Airport Kinshasa, Butembo

Blue Airlines was an airline based in the Democratic Republic of the Congo, Blue Airlines operated passenger and cargo charters.

Blue Airlines was one of the many airlines that sprang up in the Congo during the 1980s after Air Zaire was failing.

== History ==
The airline was founded in 1984 as Business Cash Flow Aviation and was based at what was at the time Zaire with the Boeing 707 and Bristol Britannia in the fleet. The airline was renamed to Blue Airlines in 1991 and during this time began diversifying the fleet.

In 1998 along with aircraft operated by Congo Air Cargo or Congo Airlines and Lignes Aériennes Congolaises a Blue Airlines Boeing 727 in Goma was seized by rebels and hijacked and used to transport arms.

In the 1990s the airline would operate flights for the Congolese military using aircraft like their L 188 Electras.

In 2000 when an ammunition warehouse caught fire an Antonov AN-28 was written off as a result. The airline was by 2006 banned from the EU as with all other DRC based airlines with the exception of flag carrier Hewa Bora Airways, and in the same year lost an Antonov AN-2 in Lubaimanga. It is rather murky what exactly happened to the airline after 2006 as that is the year the last accident happened at Blue Airlines. In December 2008 the airline no longer held a valid Air Operator's Certificate.

== Fleet ==
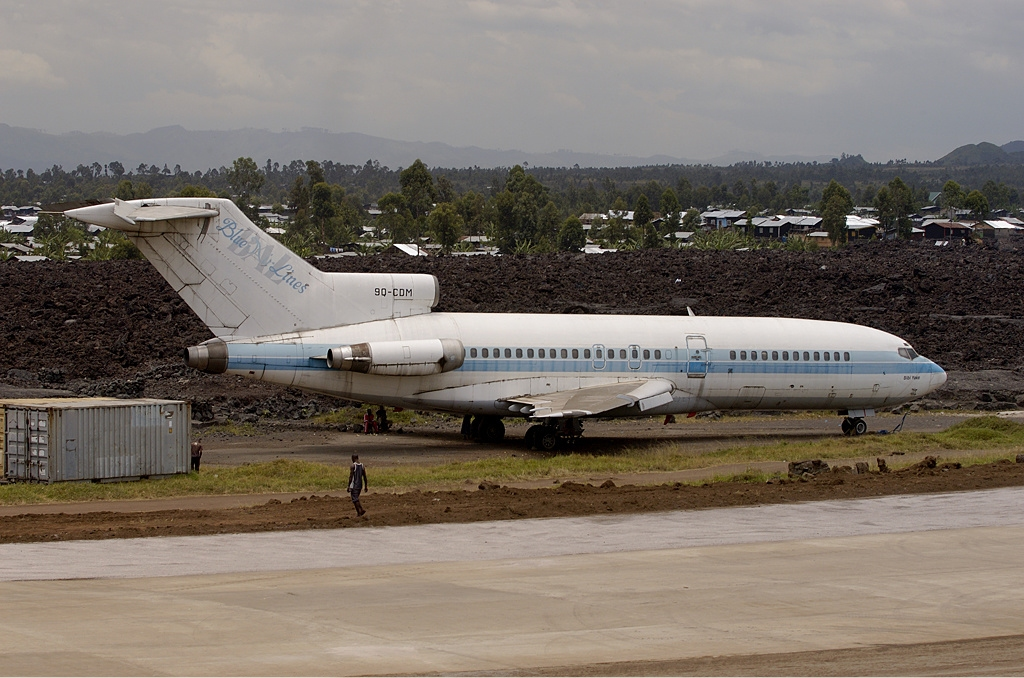
A Blue Airlines Boeing 727-100

The airline operated these aircraft

- Antonov AN-2
- Antonov AN-28
- Antonov AN-26
- Boeing 727
- Boeing 707
- Lockheed L-188 Electra

== Accidents and incidents ==
- On March 13, 1995, a Lockheed Electra descended too low and crashed
- In May 1995 a Boeing 707 had an engine explosion and was written off
- On February 18, 1999, a Lockheed Electra had its no. 3 engine fail which caused a crash that killed seven people
- On April 14, 2000, an Antonov AN-28 was written off after an ammunition warehouse caught fire
- On March 6, 2006, an Antonov AN-2 was destroyed in Lubaimanga
