= Matadi Tshimpi Airport =

Matadi Tshimpi Airport Aéroport de Matadi Tshimpi
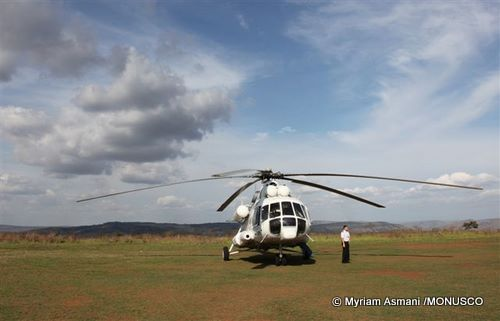
- A helicopter at Tshimpi airport, 2010
- IATA: MAT; ICAO: FZAT

Summary
- Airport type: Public
- Serves: Matadi
- Elevation AMSL: 1,115 ft / 340 m
- Coordinates: 5°48′00″S 13°26′25″E

Map
- Location of the airport in Democratic Republic of the Congo

Runways
Direction	Length		Surface
Direction	m	ft	Surface
01/19	1,570	5,150	Dirt
- Sources: GCM Google Maps SkyVector

Matadi Tshimpi Airport (IATA: MAT, ICAO: FZAM) is an airport serving the city of Matadi in Kongo Central Province, Democratic Republic of the Congo. The runway is north of Matadi, across the Congo River.

The Matadi NDB (Ident: MS) is 1 kilometre (0.62 mi) southeast of the runway.

== Airlines and destinations ==
Airlines	Destinations
Kin Avia	Kinshasa–N'Dolo

== See also ==
- Transport in the Democratic Republic of the Congo
- List of airports in the Democratic Republic of the Congo
