= Ferdinand Essandja =

Ferdinand Essandja (sometimes Fernand Essendja or Ferdinand Esandja) was a Congolese politician and businessman. He was the chairman of the Parti de l’Unité Congolaise in 1959 and worked as a chief clerk for Sabena. He attended the Belgo-Congolese Round Table Conference in early 1960 as a delegate of the Parti National du Progrès (PNP) to participate in negotiations for the Belgian Congo's independence. At one point he served as the mayor of the Barumbu commune of Léopoldville. In June 1961 Essendja became the managing director of Air Congo, the flag carrier of the Democratic Republic of the Congo. By 1967 he was the vice president of company.
