= Kinshasa Airport =

Kinshasa Airport may refer to:

- N'djili Airport, the main airport of Kinshasa
- N'Dolo Airport, a secondary airport of Kinshasa, used for domestic flights
