= 1998 Congo Airlines Boeing 727 crash =

1998 aviation incident in the Democratic Republic of the Congo

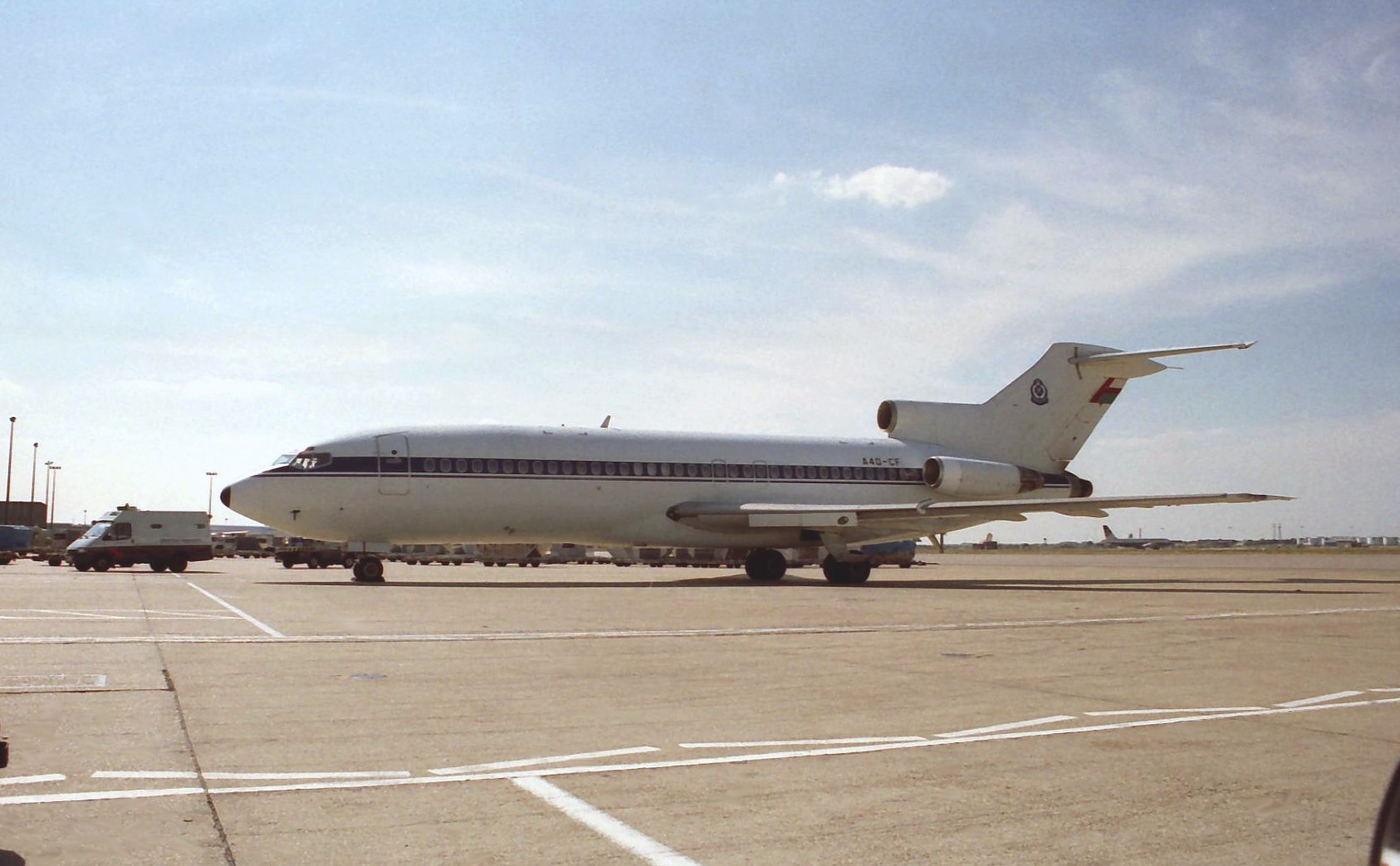
- The aircraft involved in the accident while still in service with Oman Police, in 1989

Shootdown
- Date: 10 October 1998
- Summary: Crashed into a jungle after being shot down
- Site: Lomami National Park, Democratic Republic of the Congo

Aircraft
- Aircraft type: Boeing 727-30
- Operator: Congo Airlines
- Registration: 9Q-CSG
- Flight origin: Kindu Airport
- Destination: N'djili Airport
- Occupants: 40-41 (DRC) (Note: Multiple occupant/death counts cited: 40 occupants/fatalities.; 41 occupants/fatalities.; 42 occupants/fatalities.; 50 occupants/fatalities.)
- Passengers: 37 (DRC)
- Crew: 3-4 (DRC)
- Fatalities: 40-41 (DRC)
- Survivors: 0

On 10 October 1998, a Congo Airlines Boeing 727 flying a non-scheduled domestic passenger flight from Kindu to Kinshasa was shot down by rebel forces shortly after taking off. The plane later crashed in a jungle killing all occupants on board the aircraft.

== Background ==
=== Aircraft ===
The aircraft involved, manufactured in 1965, was a 33-year-old Boeing 727-30 registered as 9Q-CSG with serial number 18369. It was powered by Pratt & Whitney JT8D-7 engines. BBC News correspondents said that aircraft leased from Congo Airlines (CAL) and Lignes Aériennes Congolaises were frequently used to ferry troops and war materials.

=== Passengers and crew ===
There were 40 to 50 occupants on board the aircraft. According to the Government of the DRC, there were 40 to 41 occupants on board the aircraft, including 37 passengers and 3 to 4 crew. The passengers were civilian evacuees mainly consisting of women and children.

== Incident ==
On 10 October 1998, the aircraft was scheduled to fly from Kinshasa to Kindu with the departure scheduled at 7 a.m. UTC. After its arrival in Kindu, the aircraft was scheduled to depart for Kinshasa at 08:45. The flight left Kinshasa at 06:56 and arrived in Kindu at 08:26. At 08:51, the aircraft took off from Kindu Airport and subsequently turned left. Air traffic control (ATC) asked the pilot for his route, to which the pilot immediately relied that he had heard firing and would call back to confirm his report. The pilot then called back, confirming that the aircraft had been hit three minutes after takeoff, and issued an SOS that was heard at Mbuji-Mayi and by another aircraft. In the last contact, the pilot informed ATC that they planned on making an emergency landing around "Kisni point", located between Kindu and Lodja.

=== Search ===
By 11 October, spotter aircraft had been unable to locate the flight. The airline said that the search had been called off for the day. A spokesman for the airline said the villagers near Kindu had claimed to have located the crash site but that poor visibility had hindered the search.

== Investigation ==
"The pilot immediately notified us that the engines were on fire, that the plane had become uncontrollable and that he would attempt to make a landing straight ahead of him - and that was the last message that we received from our crew"

— Stavros Papaioannou

Military sources reported that a missile had shot down the aircraft. Stavros Papaioannou, the president of Congo Airlines' management committee, said that in the pilot's last message, he had notified them that the plane's engines were on fire with the plane becoming uncontrollable and that he would attempt to land the aircraft "straight ahead of him. The missile had reportedly struck one of the aircraft's rear engines shortly after taking off.

=== Responsibility ===
Tutsi rebels admitted that they had shot down the plane, claiming that the flight was carrying military supplies. The leader of the rebel group said that the government had been using the aircraft to fly troops and ammunition to Kindu for several days. They also warned that any aircraft that would attempt to land at Kindu Airport would be shot down.

Although the region was in a state of war, air traffic was not closed at Kindu Airport or the airspace over the zone. According to international regulations, if an airport or airspace is closed, a NOTAM must be issued. Hence, an analysis by the Democratic Republic of the Congo concluded that per international conventions such as the Chicago Convention, "illicit acts of intervention" or the use of firearms against civilian aircraft "constitute violations against the safety of international civil aviation."

Article 4 of the Chicago Convention states: "Misuse of civil aviation: Each contracting State agrees not to use civil aviation for any purpose inconsistent with the aims of this Convention." According to International Peace Information Service, dozens of civilian aircraft that were operating to and from the DRC along with the companies operating them were in violation of the provision as civilians were exposed with the risk of being shot down, as was the case with Congo Airlines' Boeing 727.

According to the Office of Civil Aviation Security of the Federal Aviation Administration, the shootdown is not considered politically motivated due to the incident occurring in a conflict zone and the possibility of the aircraft being perceived as being used for military purposes.

=== International Court of Justice ===
On 23 June 1999, the DRC initiated proceedings against Rwanda, asking the International Court of Justice (ICJ) to adjudge and declare that Rwanda was "guilty of acts of armed aggression, massacres, human rights abuses, that Rwanda was in violation of international humanitarian law" and that it violated international conventions by shooting down the Congo Airlines Boeing 727. In January 2001, the DRC discontinued the proceedings.

On 20 May 2002, the DRC again started proceedings against Rwanda which were "in large part similar to the [23 June] 1999 Application." The DRC accused Rwanda of "'massive, serious and flagrant violations of human rights and of international humanitarian law' resulting from acts of armed aggression allegedly perpetrated by Rwanda on Congolese territory since August 1998." The DRC cited the shootdown of the Congo Airlines Boeing 727, among others, and requested that the ICJ adjudge and declare that by shooting down the Congo Airlines Boeing 727, "Rwanda also violated the United Nations Charter, the Convention on International Civil Aviation of 7 December 1944 signed at Chicago, the Hague Convention for the Suppression of Unlawful Seizure of Aircraft of 16 December 1970 and the Montreal Convention for the Suppression of Unlawful Acts Against the Safety of Civil Aviation of 23 September 1971[.]" Both parties were signatories of the Montreal Convention.

== See also ==
- List of airliner shootdown incidents
