= Cetraca Air Service =

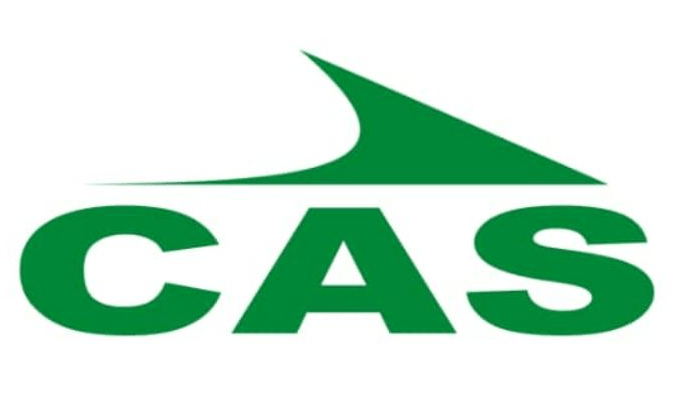

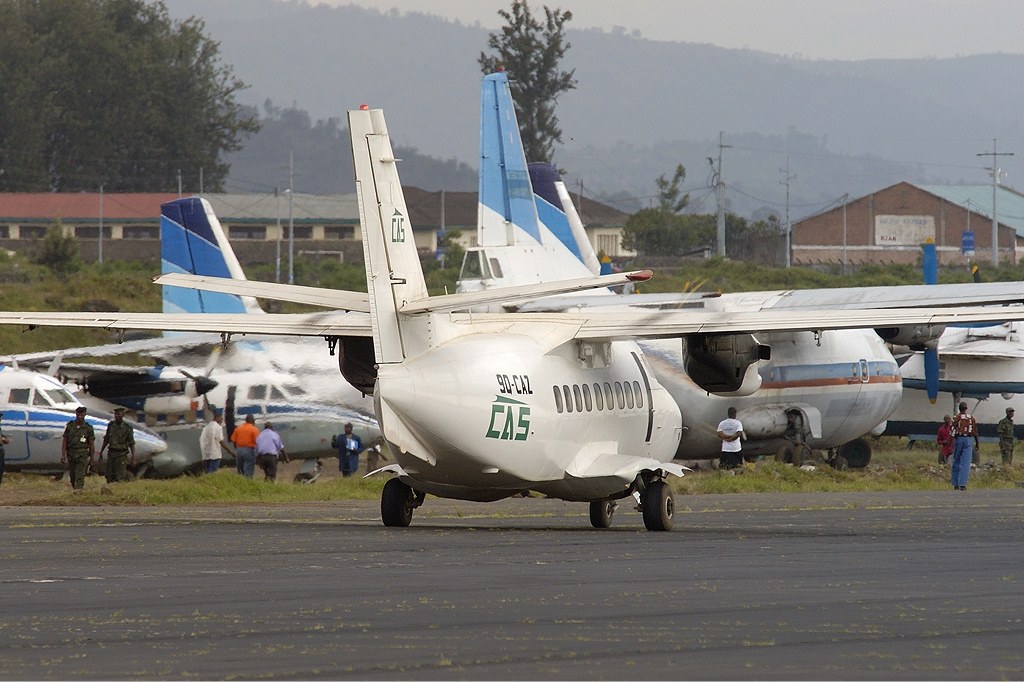
IATA	ICAO	Call sign
-	CER	-
- Founded: 2003 (1st time) 2023 (2nd time)
- Ceased operations: 2014 (1st time) 2024 (2nd time)

Cetraca Air Service was an airline based in the Democratic Republic of the Congo that existed from 2003 to 2014 and then from 2023 to 2024. The airline was banned from the EU like all other DRC based carriers.

== History ==
Cetraca Air Service was founded in 2003. The airline had its AOC revoked in 2014 along with 10 other airlines yet was able to restart operations in 2023 before ceasing operations in 2024. It may be restarting but the airline has not had its status updated since 2024.

== Fleet ==
- LET 410

== Accidents ==
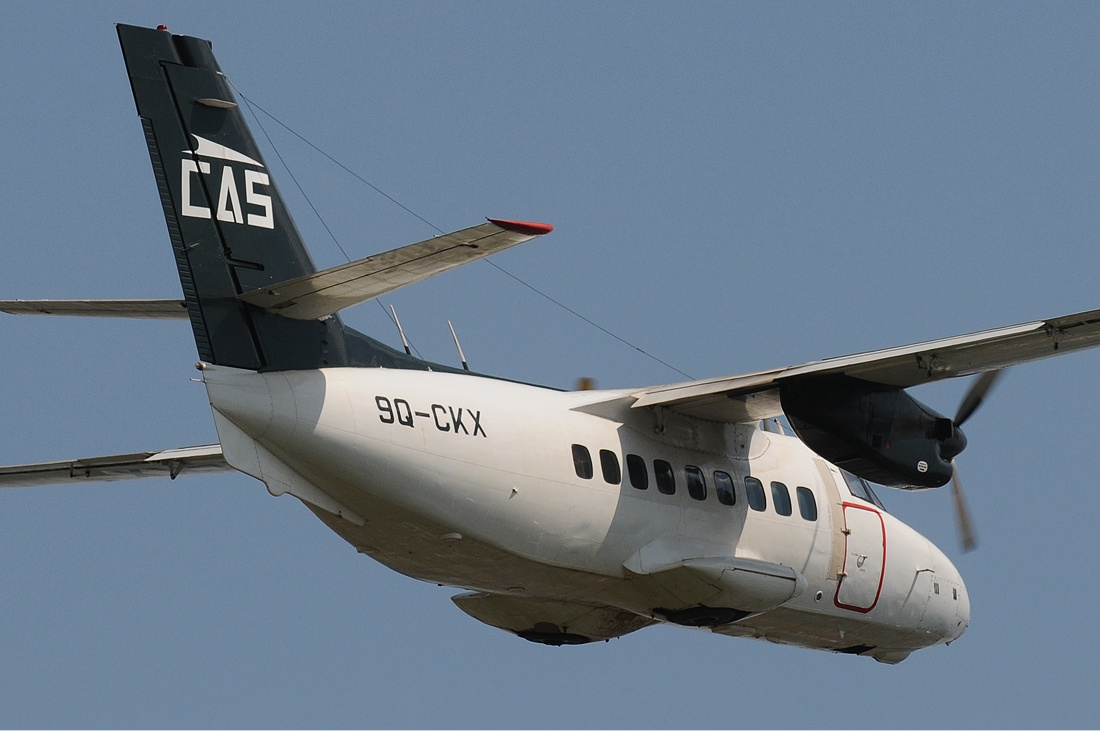
an LET 410 air to air

- On March 17, 2024, a CAS LET 410 registered as 9S-GPB crashed near the runway
- On October 30, 2012, an LET 410 overran the runway after it was unable to stop and crashed

== See also ==
- List of defunct airlines of the DRC
