= Business Aviation =

Airline of the Democratic Republic of the Congo

IATA	ICAO	Call sign
4P	ABB	AFRICAN BUSINESS
- Founded: 1998
- Ceased operations: 2007
- Hubs: N'Dolo Airport
- Fleet size: 3 (at closure)
- Destinations: 3 (at closure)
- Headquarters: Kinshasa, Democratic Republic of the Congo
- Website: http://www.businessaviation.cd/ defunct

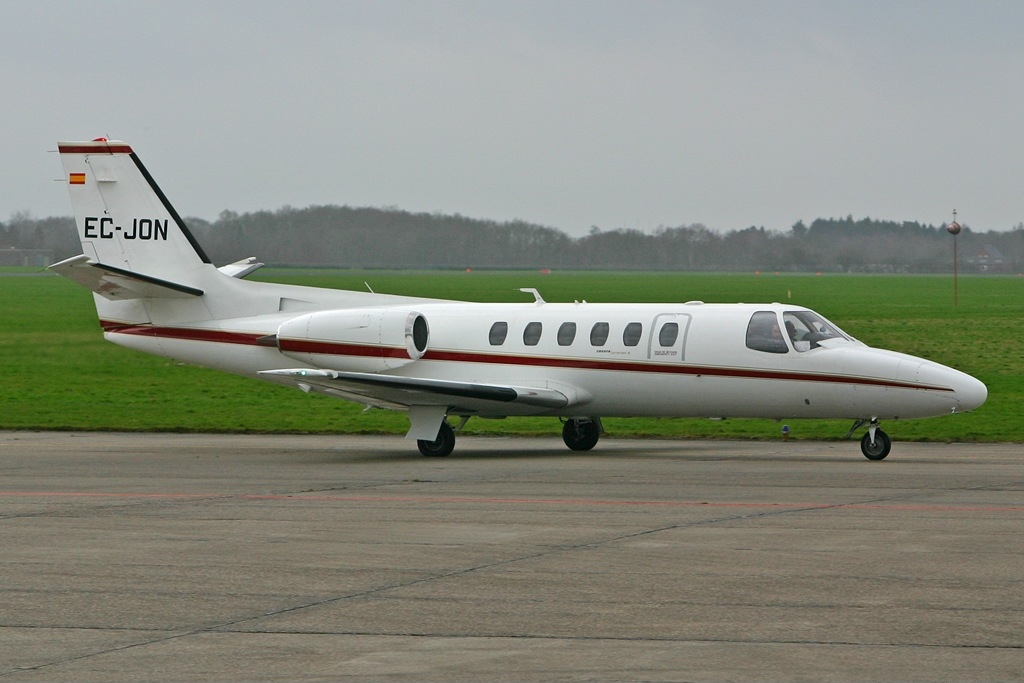
Cessna 550 Citation II used for private aviation

Business Aviation was an airline based in Kinshasa in the Democratic Republic of the Congo.

== History ==
It was established in 1998 and operated scheduled domestic and international services, as well as charter flights and wet-lease services it took over Taxavia the same year. Its main base was N'Dolo Airport, Kinshasa. In 2007, the airline was shut down.

The airline was on the List of air carriers banned in the European Union.

== Destinations ==
Business Aviation operated scheduled domestic passenger flights from Kinshasa, as well as international services to Brazzaville and Pointe-Noire.

== Fleet ==
The Business Aviation fleet included the following aircraft (as of 1 May 2008) :

- 1 Antonov An-32
- 1 Let L-410 UVP-E
- 1 McDonnell Douglas DC-9-34F (which was operated for Astral Aviation)
- Nord 262

== See also ==
- Transport in the Democratic Republic of the Congo

== Bibliography ==
- Langewiesche, William (July 2007). "Congo from the cockpit". Vanity Fair. pp. 162–168.
