= Air Tropiques =

Airline of the Democratic Republic of the Congo

IATA	ICAO	Call sign
-	-	-
- Founded: 2001
- Ceased operations: 2016 (merged into Kin Avia)
- Hubs: N'Dolo Airport
- Fleet size: 7
- Headquarters: Kinshasa, Democratic Republic of the Congo
- Website: Kin Avia Website

Air Tropiques was an airline based in Kinshasa, Democratic Republic of the Congo. It operated domestic, regional and charter flights. Its main base was N'Dolo Airport, Kinshasa.

== History ==
The airline was established in 2001 and started operations in February 2001. It had 50 employees in June 2016 when it was merged into Kin Avia. The airline was on the List of air carriers banned in the European Union. Air Tropiques was merged into Kin Avia in June 2016.

== Fleet ==
The Air Tropiques fleet included the following aircraft (at June 2016):

- 1 Fokker F27 Mk100 (9Q-CLN) (Standing)
- 1 Raytheon Beech 1900C Airliner (9Q-CEJ) (Standing without engines)
- 1 Raytheon Beech Super King Air B200 (ZS-OED)
- 1 Let-410 UVP (9Q-CEO)
- 1 Let-410 UVP-E (9Q-CFA)
- 1 Piper Seneca II (9Q-CSC) (Standing)

== See also ==
- Transport in the Democratic Republic of the Congo
