= Malift Air =

Airline of the Democratic Republic of the Congo

IATA	ICAO	Call sign
-	MLC	MALILA
- Founded: 1995
- Ceased operations: 2009
- Hubs: N'Dolo Airport
- Fleet size: 3
- Headquarters: Kinshasa, Democratic Republic of the Congo

Malift Air was an airline based in Kinshasa, Democratic Republic of the Congo. It operated domestic passenger and cargo services from 1995 until 2009. Its main base was N'Dolo Airport, Kinshasa.

The airline was added to the List of air carriers banned in the European Union on 22 March 2006 but was removed again following the end of its operations on 22 November 2009.

== History ==
The airline started operations in 1995 and was formerly known as Malila Airlift and ended operations in 2009.

== Accidents and incidents ==
- 4 October 2007 - An Antonov An-26 cargo plane crashed into a busy market in the Congolese capital Kinshasa shortly after takeoff, killing 51 people.
- 18 July 2007 - An Antonov An-24 shortly after taking off from Bandundu Airport had an engine failure, lost altitude and crashed 8 km from Bandundu. Fortunately, the 2 crew and 8 passengers aboard all survived.

== Fleet ==
As of April 2019, the Malift Air fleet is stored and inactive in Kinshasa. The fleet included:

- 1 – Antonov An-28
- 1 – Antonov An-32
- 1 – Britten-Norman BN-2 Islander

In 2003, an An-24RV bearing Malila livery and registration number EW-46498 was photographed stored at Minsk. It was still there in May 2005, but by that time it was missing its starboard propeller.

== See also ==
- Transport in the Democratic Republic of the Congo
