= Trans Air Cargo Service =

Cargo airline of the Democratic Republic of the Congo

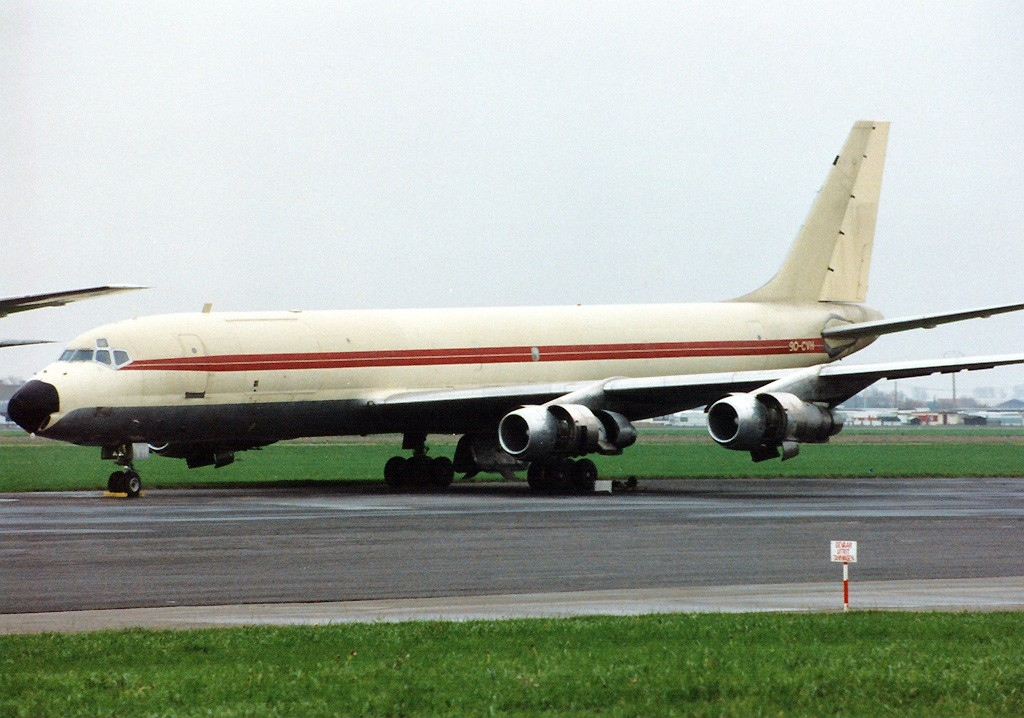
IATA	ICAO	Call sign
-	-	-
- Founded: 1992; 33 years ago (as Transair Cargo), 2004; 21 years ago (as Trans Air Cargo Service)
- Hubs: N'djili Airport
- Fleet size: 1
- Destinations: 16
- Website: http://www.transair-cargo.com/

Trans Air Cargo Service is a Congolese cargo airline headquartered in Kinshasa, Democratic Republic of the Congo. The airline operates one Douglas DC-8 throughout the Democratic Republic of the Congo to deliver freight. It is one of the last two remaining operators of the DC-8, however, its only aircraft, 9S-AJO, was damaged in an accident on 8 September 2026 and has been grounded, and possibly will be written off.Like all other airlines in Democratic Republic of the Congo, it is currently banned from flying into the European Union.

== History ==
Katale Aero Transport was the predecessor of Trans Air Cargo, founded in 1978 by Domaine de Katale. Transair Cargo was founded in 1992 by Jacques "Kiki" Lemaire. The airline ceased operations in 1998 due to a civil war and was renamed TAC Air Services, causing it to move to Rand in South Africa. Max Lemaire moved the airline back to the DRC in 2004 and renamed it to Trans Air Cargo Service. In 2026, a Douglas DC-8-60 was retired from the fleet.

== Fleet ==
=== Current fleet ===
As of July 2026, Trans Air Cargo Service operates the following aircraft, however the sole plane, 9S-AJO, was damaged in an accident on 8 September 2026 and is possibly going to be written off.

Trans Air Cargo Service Fleet
Aircraft	Total	Orders	Notes
Douglas DC-8-73F	1	—	Currently, this aircraft is damaged.

=== Former fleet ===
- 6x Douglas DC-8
- 3x Douglas DC-6
- 3x Douglas DC-4
- 2x Sud Aviation Caravelle
- 2x Boeing 707
- 2x Bristol Britannia
- 1x Vickers Viscount
- 1x Boeing 737-200
- 1x Antonov An-26
- 1x Antonov An-32
- 1x Grumman G-159 Gulfstream I
- 1x Nord 262
- 1x Boeing 727

=== As Katale Aerotransport ===
- 5x Bristol Britannia
- 1x Boeing 707
- 1x Canadair CL-44

== Destinations ==
Trans Air Cargo Service operates services to Bukavu, Bumba, Gbadolite, Gemena, Goma, Kamina, Kananga, Kindu, Kinshasa, Kisangani, Lisala, Lodja, Lubumbashi, Mbandaka, Mbuji-Mayi and Tshikapa.

== Accidents ==
In 1981 a DC 4 crashed beyond repair in Lisala.

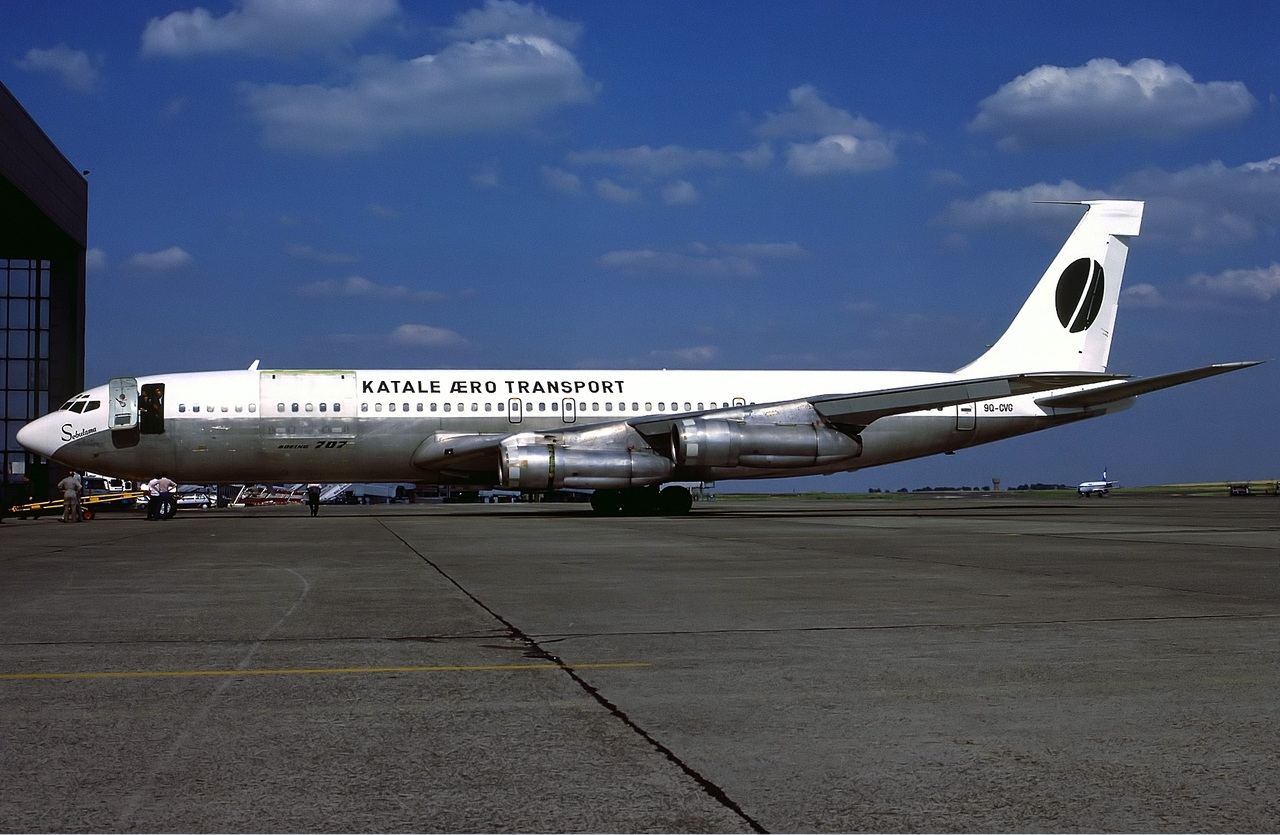
The aircraft involved in the 1990 accident

On March 1, 1990, a 707-320 registered as 9Q-CVG crashed in Goma 38 meters short of the runway. The crew failed to realize that they were short of the runway and upon impact the right gear was torn off as the aircraft slid for 300 before coming to a rest with no fatalities. The aircraft had Manufacturer's Serial Number 19162, and was built in 1966.

On August 8, 2004, the Caravelle crashed on landing at Gisenyi Airport's 1000 metre long runway. The aircraft was charted by the Celtel company to transport telecommunications equipment to Goma but diverted. The aircraft was built in 1968 and had MSN 251. However, Waltair and a Mr. K. Lemaire may also have owned the Caravelle.

On September 8, 2026 the Douglas DC-8-73F in service with the airline, suffered a runway excursion damaging the aircraft, currently it is suspected to be a write off.

== See also ==
List of airlines of the DRC
