= Lignes Aériennes Congolaises (2005–2013) =

Airline of the Democratic Republic of the Congo

IATA	ICAO	Call sign
4V	LCG	CONGOLAISE
- Founded: 2005
- Ceased operations: 2013
- Hubs: N'djili Airport
- Destinations: 11
- Parent company: Government of the Democratic Republic of the Congo
- Headquarters: Kinshasa
- Website: www.lacrdc.com

Lignes Aériennes Congolaises (English: Congolese Airlines), also known by its acronym LAC, was an airline of the Democratic Republic of the Congo, with its head office in Kinshasa, and its central administration on the property of N'djili Airport in Kinshasa. The carrier has the latter airport as the base of its flight operations. It was liquidated in 2013.

Along with all other airlines registered in the country, the company was banned from flying into any member state of the European Union's bloc.

== History ==
Formed by the Government of the Democratic Republic of the Congo in 2005, it was the successor of an airline with the same name that folded in 2003, but had a different air operator's certificate.

The carrier started operations in 2005 with LAC - SkyCongo aircraft flying on LAC's behalf. It was shut down in 2006, following an accident with a Convair 580, but was reactivated under a joint venture with Bravo Airlines. When this latter airline folded in 2007, LAC was idle once again. It apparently restarted operations in June 2008, this time with chartered equipment from Air Zimbabwe.

== Destinations ==
The company served the following destinations as part of its scheduled services:

- Angola
  - Luanda
- Cameroon
  - Douala
- Democratic Republic of the Congo
  - Goma
  - Kananga
  - Kindu
  - Kinshasa
  - Kisangani
  - Lubumbashi
  - Mbuji Mayi
- Mali
  - Bamako
- Nigeria
  - Lagos

== Fleet ==
The airline had no active aircraft on its fleet. LAC operated the following equipment throughout its history:

- Boeing 737-200
- Convair 580F
- Lockheed L-1011-50
- MD-82

== Accidents and incidents ==
- 27 April 2006: A Convair 580F, registration ZS-SKH, that was flying a Goma–Amisi cargo service, crashed on approach to Amisi Airport, killing all eight occupants aboard.

== See also ==
- Transport in the Democratic Republic of the Congo
