= Air Boyoma =

Congolese airline

Air Boyama
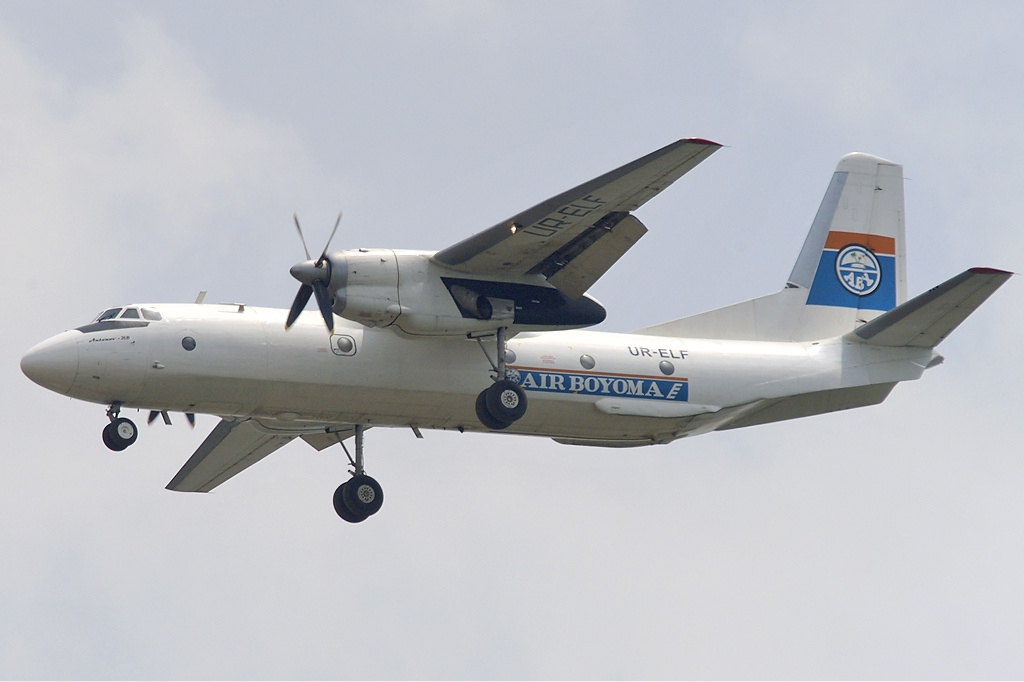
- Founded: 2001
- Ceased operations: 2009
- Headquarters: BP 505, Kisangani, DRC

Air Boyoma was an airline based in the Democratic Republic of the Congo. Its AOC was revoked in 2009.

== History ==
Air Boyoma was founded in 2001 as a regional operator. The airline was an operator of one Antonov An-24 and two Antonov An-26 aircraft. The first Antonov AN 26 was leased in 2002 and passed on to Cityline Hungary. The Antonov AN 24 was leased in 2003 and was given up in 2005. In 2006 the airline was banned from the EU along with all DRC based airlines except for Hewa Bora Airways for its Brussels service. On July 30, 2009, the AOC of Air Boyoma was revoked.

== Fleet ==
The airline operated the following aircraft

- 2x Antonov AN 26
- 1x Antonov AN 24
