= Barumbu =

- Commune
- Commune de Barumbu
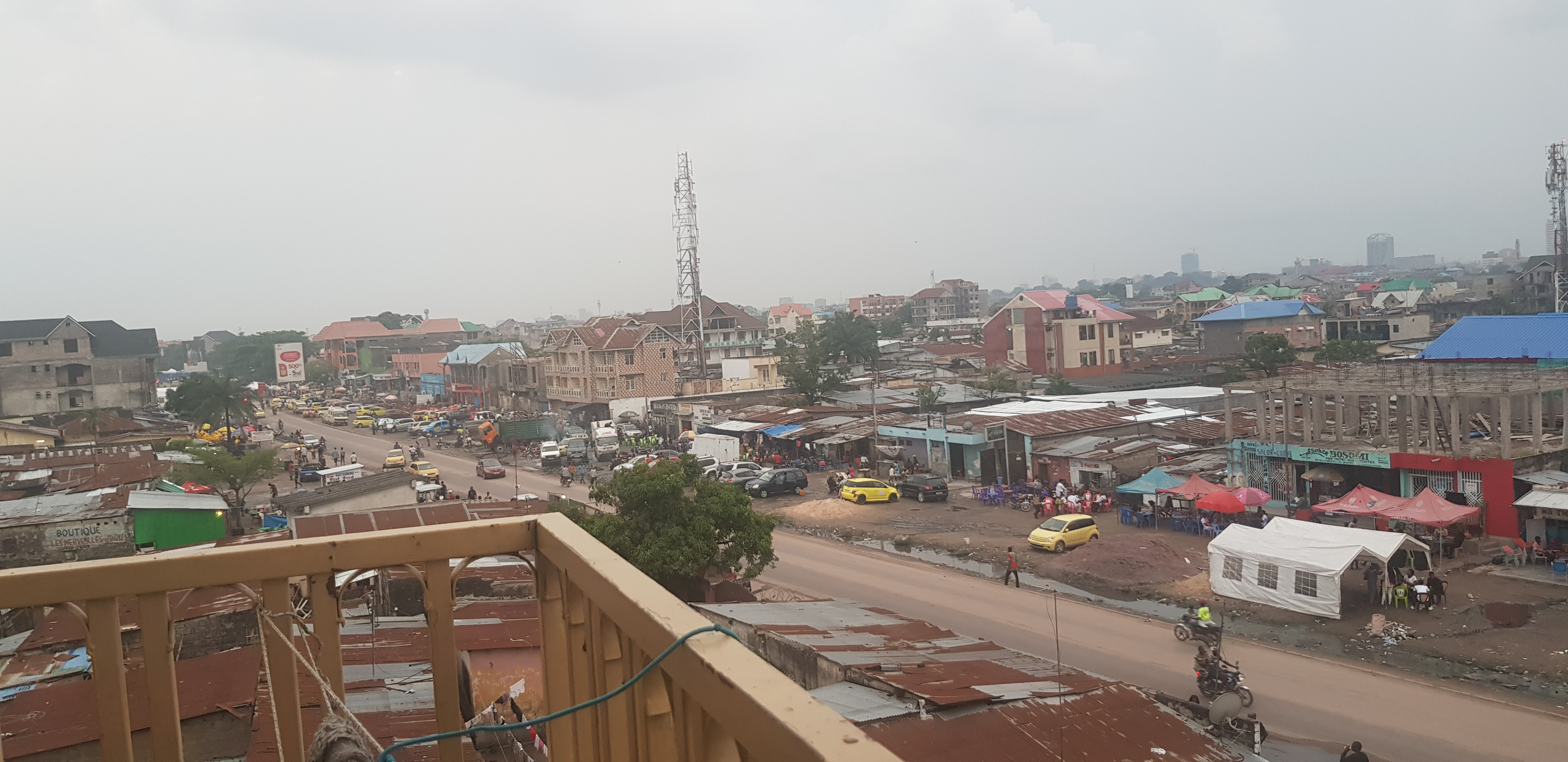
- Kabambare Avenue in Barumbu
- Barumbu on map of Kinshasa city-province
- Location in DR Congo
- Coordinates: 04°19′01″S 15°19′40″E
- Country: DR Congo
- City-Province: Kinshasa

Area
  - Total: 4.72 km^{2} (1.82 sq mi)

Population (2015 est.)
  - Total: 413,628
  - Density: 87,600/km^{2} (227,000/sq mi)

Barumbu is a commune in the Lukunga District of Kinshasa, located strategically in the northern region of the city. As of 2015, Barumbu had an estimated population of 413,628, making it one of Kinshasa's more densely populated communes.

Historically, Barumbu's development paralleled Kinshasa's transition from a colonial outpost known as Léopoldville to a sprawling urban center. The commune is often called Kinshasa's "museum commune" for its preserved historical architecture, including colonial-era residences constructed from compressed earth. Barumbu has seen rapid urbanization, with a notable increase in multi-story residential buildings, particularly apartment complexes. The area has also experienced a commercial boom, with a proliferation of shops and boutiques.

== Geography ==
=== Location ===
Barumbu spans the expansive Kinshasa plain and extends into adjacent wetland areas. The commune lies within an east-west depression, where the water table is close to the surface, often within two meters. The base elevation of Barumbu remains around 280 to 282 meters; however, there is a gradual rise in the north, reaching approximately 286 meters along a coastal ridge.

Barumbu shares borders with several prominent communes and landmarks. To the north, it is bordered by the Gombe commune, delineated by a line extending from Avenue Télégraphie along Avenue Luambo Makiadi (formerly Avenue Bokassa) until it intersects with Avenue Bakongo. The boundary continues along Tabora Avenue, eventually meeting the Bitshaku-Tshaku River. To the south, it adjoins the communes of Kalamu and Limete, separated by the Kalamu River and the Matadi–Kinshasa Railway. The eastern boundary follows the Kinshasa-Matadi Railway line, extending between the Kalamu River and the Bitshaku-Tshaku collector, eventually reaching the Malebo Pool. To the west, Barumbu is bordered by the Kinshasa commune.

=== Geology ===
Barumbu's soil is predominantly classified as underdeveloped due to its alluvial composition. This soil, formed primarily from valley deposits, is light, highly permeable, and has limited humus content, with sand accounting for over 56% of its composition. Consequently, the soil is known for its sandy texture.

=== Hydrology and watercourses ===
The commune is traversed by several water bodies, including the Kalamu River and the Nyanza and Bitshaku-Tshaku collectors. The Bitshaku-Tshaku, Barumbu's main watercourse, runs southwest to northeast, fed by an exposed water table. Originating near Stade Cardinal Malula in the Kinshasa commune, it flows parallel to Kilosa Avenue and veers northeast at Itaga Avenue to merge with the river at Société Commerciale des Transports et des Ports, covering approximately 2,800 meters. The Bitshaku-Tshaku has two significant tributaries, the Bakongo and Itaga streams, and receives rainwater from the Marais, Plateau, and Bokassa avenues.

The Bitshaku-Tshaku has a gentle slope of approximately 2%, with its entire length masonry-lined to stabilize its course. This waterway's trapezoidal cross-section, set at 45-degree angles, varies in width, reaching up to 6 meters in the downstream section with a depth of 2.3 meters. This structure can facilitate a flow rate of about 50 cubic meters per second in optimal conditions. However, the general condition of the Bitshaku-Tshaku has deteriorated due to dislocated masonry and extensive rubbish deposits that obstruct its flow.

=== Vegetation and climate ===
Historical records and aerial photographs from 1957 to 1960 indicate the presence of a natural vegetation cover during that period. However, urban development, land clearing, and extensive construction have significantly altered the commune's landscape. The remnants of Barumbu's original vegetation are now mainly limited to areas like the Binza Météo reserves, which serve as a reminder of the once-abundant flora. Today, the natural vegetation has largely been replaced by urban infrastructure, subdivisions, and various forms of cultivated greenery. The area is now populated with fruit-bearing trees, such as mango and avocado, along with ornamental plants, integrated within the urban layout and residential developments.

Barumbu experiences a humid tropical climate typical of Kinshasa, which is marked by two distinct seasons: a dry season lasting from mid-May to early September, spanning roughly three to four months, and a long rainy season from September through May, lasting about seven months.

=== Administrative division ===
The commune of Barumbu is administratively divided into nine quartiers (quarters), which are further subdivided into avenues.

No.	Quartiers	Number of avenues	Number of streets	Number of plots
1.	Bitshaku-Tshaku	5	12	347
2.	Funa I	4	9	602
3.	Funa II	2	10	335
4.	Kapinga Bapu	11	17	520
5.	Kasai	7	5	441
6.	Libulu	4	12	698
7.	Mozindo	4	16	673
8	N'dolo	17	9	742
9.	Tshimanga	58	12	342

Source: Independent National Electoral Commission (2009).

The characteristics of these quartiers vary significantly: planned urban quartiers tend to be smaller and structured according to an orderly street layout, while semi-urban and informally developed areas are larger, more populous, and form a substantial part of Kinshasa's urban sprawl. Barumbu is also home to two military installations: Camp Ndolo, which includes a prison, and Camp Mbaki. Land management has posed additional challenges, with unauthorized encroachment on areas around the railway line leading to Kintambo and Kinshasa Central Station due to informal land sales by some agents.

== History ==
Barumbu is one of the earliest eleven administrative communes of the capital and was officially established by decree-law on 26 March 1957. Alongside Lingwala and the commune of Kinshasa, it formed part of the cités indigènes (indigenous settlement) created in the early twentieth century. The commune's present-day boundaries are defined by Ministerial Order No. 69-0042 of 23 January 1969, which specifies the number, names, and limits of the communes within the city-province of Kinshasa. Its current administrative operations are regulated by Law No. 82-008 of 25 February 1982, which sets out the legal status of the city-province of Kinshasa and outlines the territorial organization of the Democratic Republic of the Congo.

== Infrastructure ==
Barumbu's basic structure of the commune's infrastructure is organized around densely built residential plots. These plots serve as the fundamental units of land use, with most dedicated to housing and some accommodating small street-side businesses. The average plot covers around 300 square meters, with a high land occupation rate where buildings cover 70% or more of the plot on three-quarters of the properties. This density impacts the residents' living conditions, leaving limited outdoor space, which is typically used as a shaded communal area for social gatherings and meals. Small businesses, such as kiosks for drinks or cigarettes, often operate at the plot's edge, near the street.

Its road network is limited, with the main boundaries marked by Bokassa Avenue to the west and Poids Lourds Avenue to the east, both of which serve as primary routes. Although these roads have a significant footprint of approximately 60 meters, the actual road width is narrow and measures just 7 meters. The commune's primary and secondary roads, which include extensions of Kinshasa, Kabinda, Kabambare, and Itaga avenues, are paved and generally in good condition, while tertiary, unpaved roads frequently deteriorate during the rainy season. Barumbu has around 18 kilometers of surfaced roads and 41 kilometers of dirt roads, which present challenges during wet weather. Key access routes to Barumbu include Kabambare, Bokassa, and Kasaï avenues, although these roads are in an advanced state of disrepair, with partial rehabilitation occurring only on sections of Kabambare and Kabinda avenues in 2009. Traffic congestion is common near Ndolo Airport due to poor road conditions.

== Government ==
Barumbu is constituted as a decentralized territorial entity (entité territoriale décentralisée, ETD) with its own legal status and administrative self-governance. Its institutional framework is based on two principal bodies:

- The Conseil Communal (Communal Council) serves as the legislative authority of the commune. It is made up of councillors elected by direct universal suffrage and is responsible for deliberating on issues of local importance in the economic, social, cultural, and technical spheres. In addition, the council elects the mayor (bourgmestre) and deputy mayor through indirect elections and oversees the execution of policies and programs adopted by the executive.
- The Collège Exécutif Communal (Communal Executive College), led by the mayor and supported by the deputy mayor, is the executive branch of the commune. Alongside these officials, the college includes two aldermen appointed on the basis of expertise, integrity, and representativeness. This body manages the commune's daily operations and implements the decisions of the Communal Council. Although the commune enjoys autonomy in local administration, its institutions operate under the general supervision of the Governor of Kinshasa.

Administratively, each quartier is administered by officials appointed by the Governor, including a chef de quartier (quarter chief), a deputy, a secretary, a population officer, and a team of enumerators (agents recenseurs).

Barumbu also serves as a host for decentralized services of national ministries, covering areas such as civil status, population management, economic affairs, small and medium-sized enterprises, infrastructure, health, sanitation, environmental protection, culture and arts, urban development, housing, legal services, sports, youth affairs, gender and family, and energy. The commune also accommodates national institutions and specialized state services, including the National Intelligence Agency, the Directorate General of Migration, and offices dealing with human rights, rural development, industry, public service, tourism, political parties, and non-motorized transportation. The Régie des Voies Aériennes maintains its headquarters in Barumbu's Ndolo quartier.

== Economy ==
Air Kasaï previously established its headquarters on the grounds of Ndolo Airport in Barumbu. During its years of operation, Hewa Bora Airways also had its headquarters in the commune. Barumbu does not have a major central market, but instead hosts three small markets called Wenze ya Imbwa, Wenze ya Libulu, and Kabambare.

== Demographics ==
In 2008, the population of Barumbu was estimated at 98,763 residents. Since its establishment in 1959, the commune has been populated mainly by foreign communities, notably West Africans, Lebanese, Angolans known as "Zombo", and Congolese from Brazzaville. Barumbu's population has risen steadily over the years, driven by natural increase, particularly births, and by migration. These population movements were exacerbated by armed conflict and insecurity in the country's eastern regions. Owing to its strategic location near Kinshasa's city center, where the majority of economic and administrative activities are based, Barumbu has become an attractive place of residence, particularly for West Africans and other city residents. By 2015, the population was estimated at 413,628, ranking Barumbu among the most densely populated communes in Kinshasa.

Historical population
Year	1967	1970	1984	2003	2004
Pop.	44,900	59,553	69,147	145,370	150,319
±%	—	+32.6%	+16.1%	+110.2%	+3.4%

== Waste management and sanitation ==
Barumbu faces significant waste management and sanitation challenges. Plots in Barumbu are generally enclosed, and most residents are tenants. While the owner often resides on the plot, renting out sections to tenants, this is not always the case. If present, the owner usually has private sanitary facilities, while tenants share communal ones. These facilities generally consist of a toilet connected to a septic pit, which requires regular emptying, and a shower with water flowing freely onto the plot or toward the roadside gutter. Rainwater drainage is insufficient, often resulting in water pooling and flooding residences.

A 2007 inspection, partially funded by Lukunga District, reviewed 4,621 plots, revealing widespread issues:

- 13 plots lacked any sanitary facilities;
- 750 plots had Arab-style septic tanks in disrepair, while 450 plots had such tanks in good condition;
- 1,454 plots had standard septic tanks in good condition;
- 1,967 plots had deteriorating septic systems, including broken, perforated, filled, or open slabs.

== Notable people ==
- Rebo Tchulo, singer-songwriter
- Ferdinand Essandja, politician and businessman
- Gloria Sengha Panda Shala, human rights activist
- Dikembe Mutombo, professional basketball player
- Debaba, singer-songwriter
