= Air Brousse =

Airline in the Belgian Congo

- Founded: March 1955
- Ceased operations: 31 December 1966
- Headquarters: Leopoldville, Belgian Congo

Air Brousse was a Congolese airline. The carrier was formed in 1955 by a group of Belgians and flew services within the Belgian Congo, mainly from Leopoldville and Luluabourg. Air Brousse also operated feeder services for Sabena. It had its headquarters in Leopoldville.

The company ceased operations on 31 December 1966 and was taken over by Air Congo on 30 June 1967.

== History ==
Air Brousse was established as a private enterprise in March 1955. The Belgians who owned the company were distributors for Aero Commander, Hughes and Piper aircraft in the Congo. In the beginnings, the carrier flew local scheduled services from Leopoldville and Luluabourg, but charter services were also undertaken. It also run feeder services for Sabena.

By April 1960, the fleet comprised four Rapides, two Piper Pacer, two Tri-Pacers and one Tiger Moth that worked scheduled and charter services within the Belgian Congo. The carrier also run a maintenance facility for private aircraft. Employment was at 143 in April 1964. The number of employees had grown to 158 by April 1965. Focusing mainly on the transport of passengers, at this time the airline also undertook aerial works and kept a minor shareholding in Air Congo, which had been formed in 1961 with the government and Sabena being the major shareholders, together keeping 95% of the shares, and Air Brousse and Sobelair holding the balance.

Air Brousse operated until 31 December 1966. The company was absorbed by Air Congo on 30 June 1967. Cogeair took over some of the routes formerly operated by Air Brousse.

== See also ==
- Transport in the Democratic Republic of the Congo

== Bibliography ==
- Guttery, Ben R. (1998). Encyclopedia of African Airlines. Jefferson, North Carolina: Mc Farland & Company, Inc. ISBN 0-7864-0495-7.
