= Agence et Messageries Aérienne du Zaïre =

Zairean airline

Agence et Messageries Aérienne du Zaïre (AMAZ)
- Founded: 1960s
- Ceased operations: Late 1970s
- Headquarters: Aérodrome de N'Dolo, Kinshasa, Zaire

Agence et Messageries Aérienne du Zaïre (AMAZ), formerly Agence et Messageries Aérienne du Congo (AMAC), was a Zairean airline. It had its headquarters at Aérodrome de N'Dolo in Kinshasa. The carrier was formed in the 1960s to take over some services flown by Cogeair, and provided feeder services to Air Zaïre. It ceased operations in the late 1970s.

== History ==
The company was established in the 1960s to partly take over the route network operated by Cogeair and to provide services to destinations not served by Air Zaire. In 1971, Cogeair was taken over by the company. At March 1973, the carrier had Aztecs, Beech C-45s, DC-3s, Herons and Islanders in operation deployed on a route network that included 20 cities and villages in the country, linked to Goma, Kananga, Kinshasa or Lubumbashi.

By February 1975, Agence et Messageries Aérienne du Zaïre was operating an extensive feeder network along the Kinshasa–Lusanga–Idiofa–Ilebo–Kinshasa and Kinshasa–Boma–Moanda–Kinshasa runs that connected with Air Zaïre services, and also linked Kalemie and Moba with Lubumbashi. At this time, the fleet included seven Beech C-45s, four BN-2A Islanders, two de Havilland Herons, three Douglas DC-3s, one Douglas DC-4, one Mitsubishi MU-2G and three Piper Aztecs. These aircraft were also used for charter passenger and cargo flights. At April 1978, the fleet consisted of three BN-2A Islanders, two DC-3s, four Douglas DC-4s and one HS.125-400B.

Agence et Messageries Aérienne du Zaïre ceased operations in the late 1970s.

== Destinations ==
Following is a list of destinations served by the carrier throughout its history:

- Beni
- Boma
- Bunia
- Idiofa
- Ilebo
- Kalemie
- Kananga
- Kinshasa
- Lubumbashi
- Lusanga
- Masi-Manimba
- Moanda
- Moba

== Fleet ==
Through the years, the carrier operated the following aircraft:

- Beech C-45
- BN-2A Islander
- de Havilland Heron
- Douglas DC-3
- Douglas DC-4
- HS.125
- Mitsubishi MU-2G
- Piper PA-23 Aztec
- Piper PA-25 Pawnee

== See also ==
- Transport in the Democratic Republic of the Congo

== Bibliography ==
- Guttery, Ben R. (1998). Encyclopedia of African Airlines. Jefferson, NC: McFarland & Company. ISBN 0-7864-0495-7.
