= 2007 Africa One Antonov An-26 crash =

2007 DR Congo aircraft incident

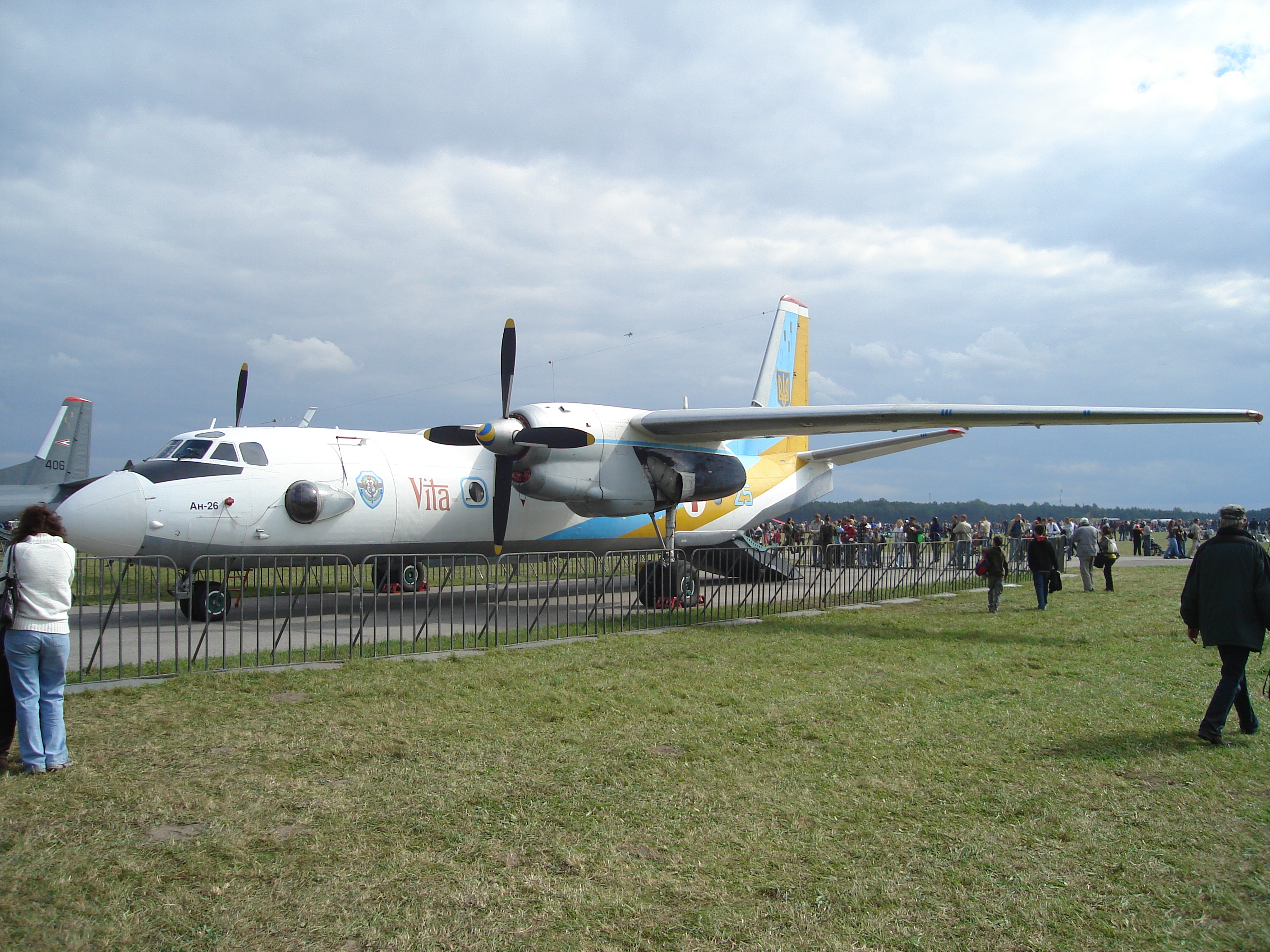
- Antonov An-26 at the Radom Air Show

Accident
- Date: 4 October 2007
- Summary: Propeller separation caused by deterioration
- Site: N'djili Airport, Kinshasa, Democratic Republic of the Congo; 4.40°S 15.41°E
- Total fatalities: 51 (including 30 on the ground)
- Total injuries: At least 30

Aircraft
- Aircraft type: Antonov An-26
- Operator: Malift Air
- Registration: 9Q-COS
- Occupants: 22
- Passengers: 17
- Crew: 5
- Injuries: 1 (possibly 2)
- Survivors: 1 (possibly 2)

Ground casualties
- Ground fatalities: 30
- Ground injuries: At least 29 (or 28)

The 2007 Africa One Antonov An-26 crash occurred when a twin engine Antonov An-26, belonging to the Congolese air carrier Africa One, crashed and burned shortly after takeoff from N'djili Airport in Kinshasa, Democratic Republic of the Congo on 4 October 2007. The flight left N'djili at 10:43 local time bound for Tshikapa, a distance of 650 kilometres (400 mi; 350 nmi) to the east.

== Background ==
The flight was variously reported as operated by El Sam Airlines or Malila Airlift, with the aircraft leased from Africa One. Both carriers are on the list of air carriers banned in the EU, as are all but one of the Congolese airlines. The aircraft was an Antonov An-26, registered 9Q-COS.

The flight was a commercial cargo flight carrying at least 28, including a flight crew of five. The flight manifest stated that there were 16 passengers aboard, but more boarded the flight shortly before takeoff.

== Crash ==
The Russian foreign ministry reports that the aircraft lost a propeller, then a wing struck an obstacle, shearing the wing off prior to crashing. Striking a market before coming to rest at a residence at 77 Mayulu Av in the Kingasani district of the Kimbanseke commune, at least 30 people on the ground were killed. The reports of survivors are conflicting: initial reports had all aboard killed, including the Russian pilot, copilot and flight engineer, yet later Reuters reported that an on-board mechanic survived, while Associated Press claims a flight attendant also survived, bringing the total number of survivors to two.

=== Mechanic's account ===
Kinshasa International Airport

The on-board mechanic, M. Dédé Ngamba, was possibly the sole surviving passenger. His description (in French) was,

Nous avons décollé après trois minutes de taxi. Aussitôt, j'ai constaté que l'avion s'est mis à tanguer. L'effort du pilote de faire monter l'avion est demeuré vain. C'est alors que l'hôtesse m'a dit de mettre la ceinture de sécurité. En ce moment, l'avion a commencé à voler plus bas et il a percuté un palmier et perdu une aile. Ensuite, il a commencé à percuter des maisons. Tous les colis des marchandises qui étaient à bord ont fait mouvement vers l'avant de l'avion. J'ai aperçu à côté de moi un trou par lequel je suis sorti sans savoir comment, et je suis tombé sur une flaque d'eau sablonneuse. J'ai pu alors contempler les flammes de l'avion qui consumait. Il ne s'agissait pas d'un poids exagéré. C'est une simple défaillance mécanique. (Note: This translates into the following: We had taken off after taxiing for three minutes. I immediately noticed that the plane had started to pitch. The pilot's effort to pitch the plane was in vain. It was then that the stewardess told me to put on my seat belt. In that moment, the plane started to fly lower and it struck a palm tree and lost a wing. Then it started to collide with houses. All the parcels of goods which were on board shifted toward the front of the plane. I noticed beside me a hole by which I left without knowing how, and I fell into a mud puddle. I could then contemplate the flames which consumed the plane. It was not about excess weight. It's a simple mechanical failure.)

== Cause ==
The cause of the disaster was a design flaw caused by deterioration of engine parts and the aircraft's livery due to the extensive use of tropical routes.

== Aftermath ==
The crash was similar to the 1996 Air Africa crash, which also involved an Antonov An-32 overshooting the runway (albeit at Kinshasa's other airport N'Dolo) with massive casualties on the ground. The DRC has an aviation safety track record that has been dubbed "an embarrassment" by the IATA, and the Transport Minister Rémy Henri Kuseyo Gatanga was fired by the President for culpable negligence in failing to enforce adequate standards and procedures for aviation safety management. One source indicates that the lifting of the Transport Minister's ban on Antonov flights over DRC territory was not by his order but rather that of the Minister of State to the Head of State.

A formal Parliamentary commission of inquiry was convened 19 October 2007, with Jean-Lucien Bussa as president and Lessendjina as vice-president. The prosecutor's office of N'Djili is seized of the matter.

Notwithstanding the ban, another Antonov (this one an An-12 registered as ER-AXI) was reported by Radio Okapi to have had a minor motor fire at Bangoka International Airport at Kisangani early in the afternoon of 1 November 2007. No injuries and minor damage were reported.

Three months after the crash, Moscow offered US$200,000 in economic aid to the injured parties.
