= Vanga, Kwilu =

Town in Kwilu, DR Congo

Vanga
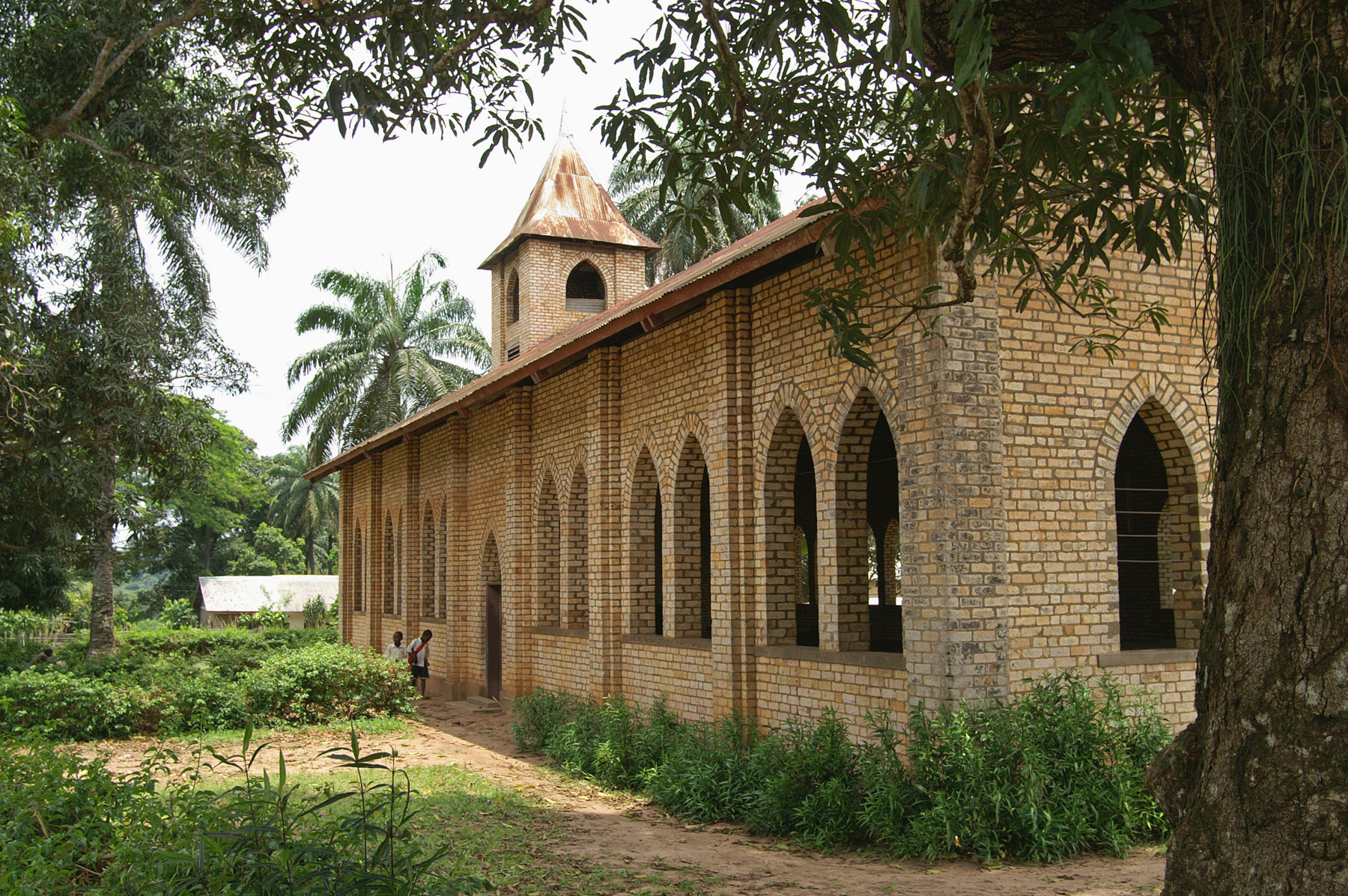
- Baptist Church in Vanga

- Location in the Democratic Republic of the Congo
- Country: DR Congo
- Province: Kwilu
- Territory: Bulungu, Kwilu
- Time zone: UTC+1 (West Africa Time)
- Official language: French
- National language: Kikongo, Lingala

Vanga (vɑːɳɢ/ə/) is a town in Kwilu province in the Democratic Republic of the Congo, approximately 340 kilometres (210 mi) east of the capital city Kinshasa. Vanga is in Bulungu Territory. Vanga is known for its large medical center that supports the greater Bandundu region.

== Transport ==
The two main modes of transportation in and out of Vanga are the Kwilu River and flights through the Mission Aviation Fellowship (MAF) pilots. Vanga Airport is used for transportation of medical supplies and visitors. The runway is suitable for a 4-8 seater Cessna. The river is a dominant resource for transporting goods as it is less than a mile away from the town.

== Language ==
Residents speak the following languages: Lingala, Kituba, Kikongo, French, and English.

== Vanga Hospital ==
Vanga's medical center of Bandundu (DRC) is run by an evangelical community. This is the largest hospital in the region. It welcomes 13,000 patients a year, has more than 400 beds, and employs 13 doctors and hundreds of nurses. The location has existed since 1908. The hospital has a medical residency program which continues to grow in size.

== Industries ==
Agriculture, medical support, and local market businesses are the dominant sources of local income. The primary exported good is coffee and maize, and land is owned and cultivated by locals. The medical center is a common source of employment for those with a basic education. The local market sells everything from raw materials for cooking, to hot meals and phone minutes. Stations at the market can be rented for a short time or regularly.
