= Vanga Airport =

- IATA: none; ICAO: FZCD

Summary
- Airport type: Public
- Serves: Vanga
- Elevation AMSL: 1,312 ft / 400 m
- Coordinates: 4°25′30″S 18°25′35″E

Map
- Location of the airport in Democratic Republic of the Congo

Runways
Direction	Length		Surface
Direction	m	ft	Surface
01/19	1,070	3,510	Grass
- Sources: GCM Google Maps

Vanga Airport (ICAO: FZCD) is an airport serving the town of Vanga in Kwilu Province, Democratic Republic of the Congo.

Airport facilities are run and maintained by Mission Aviation Fellowship.

== See also ==
- Transport in the Democratic Republic of the Congo
- List of airports in the Democratic Republic of the Congo
