= Serve Air Cargo =

Congolese airline

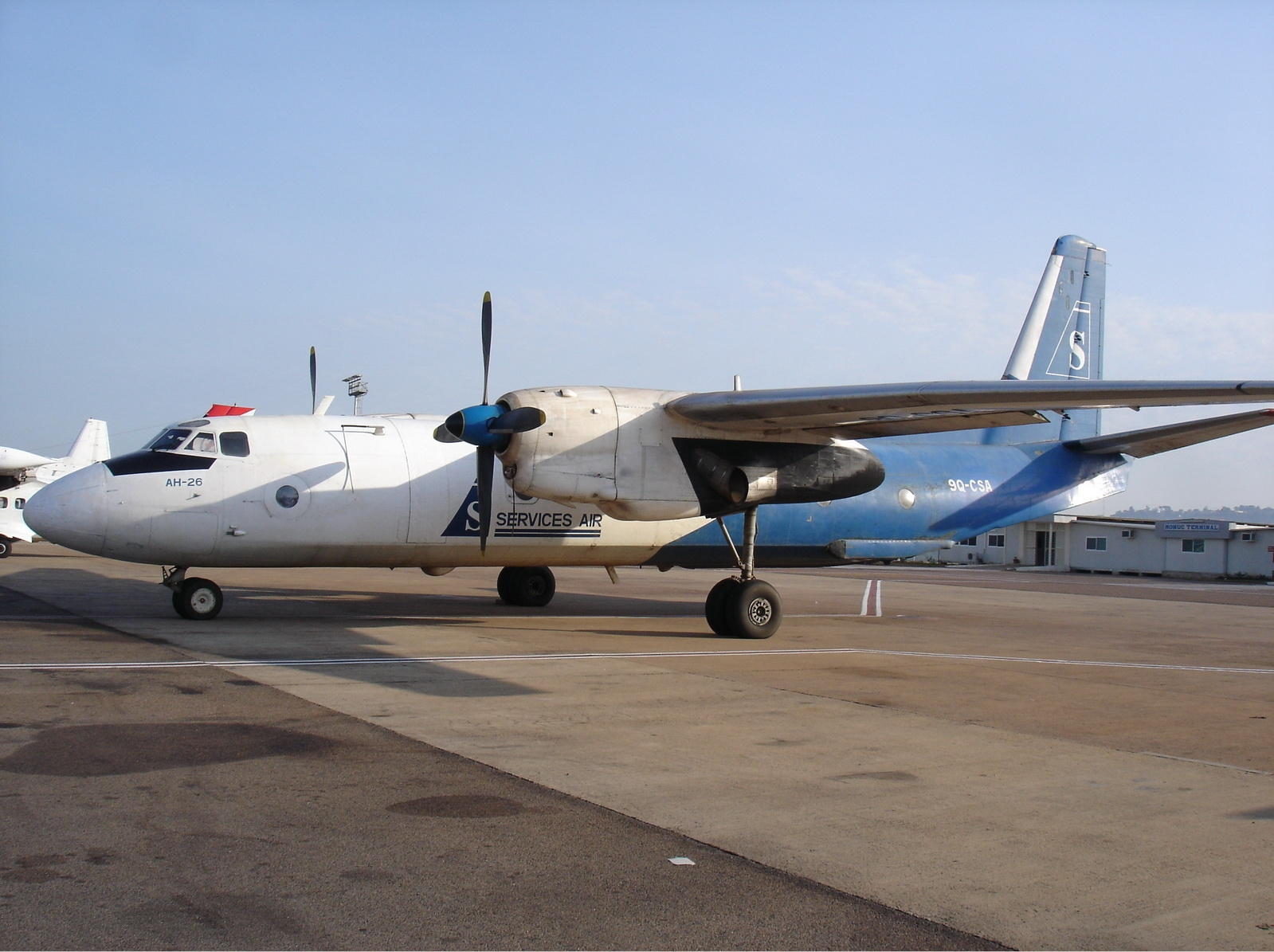
- Services Air Antonov An-26
| IATA | ICAO | Call sign |
|---|---|---|
| S2 | SRV | SERVAIR |
- Founded: 1993
- Fleet size: 13
- Destinations: Over 25 (in the DRC)
- Website: https://serveaircargo.com

Serve Air Cargo is a DRC based airline that is dominat especially in the air freight market. The airline was founded in 1993 by Harish Jagtani. Its main base is N'Djili International Airport. The company operates a fleet of several cargo aircraft adapted to the country's conditions. It is currently headed by Jai Jagtani, son of the founder, as chief executive officer (CEO). It is banned from the EU like all other DRC based carriers and isn't IOSA certified. The airline initially began as Services Air and became one of the leading cargo airlines in the region.

== Fleet ==
As of July 2026, Serve Air Cargo operates the following aircraft:

| Aircraft | In service | Orders | Passengers |
|---|---|---|---|
| Boeing 727-200F | 4 | — | |
| Boeing 737-300F | 6 | — | |
| Boeing 737-800SF | 3 | — | |
| Total | 13 | — | |

== Accidents and incidents ==
- 26 May 2009: An Antonov An-26 operated by Services Air crashes short of the runway at Matari Airport, Democratic Republic of the Congo, killing three of the four people on board. The aircraft is destroyed in the crash. It had previously been placed on a blacklist by the International Civil Aviation Organization and Antonov.
- 24 December 2015: An Airbus A310 operated by Serve Air Cargo overruns the runway at Mbuji Mayi Airport, Democratic Republic of the Congo, killing 8 people on the ground. The aircraft is written off.

== See also ==
List of airlines of the Democratic Republic of the Congo
