= CityLine Hungary =

Hungarian charter airline based at Budapest Ferihegy International Airport

IATA	ICAO	Call sign
ZM	CNB	CITYHUN
- Founded: March 2003
- Ceased operations: 2015
- Operating bases: Budapest Ferihegy International Airport
- Fleet size: 3
- Destinations: charter
- Headquarters: Vecsés, Hungary
- Key people: András Vinnai (CEO)
- Website: citylinehungary.com

CityLine Hungary Ltd. was a Hungarian charter airline based at Budapest Ferihegy International Airport with its headquarters in Vecsés.

== History ==
The airline was founded in March 2003 with the aim of providing cargo operations to European, African and CIS countries with two Antonov An-26B aircraft. In 2009, the airline began operating passenger flights from Milan-Malpensa Airport in Italy to holiday destinations with a Boeing 737-200 aircraft. CityLine Hungary employed over 120 employees in May 2010 and also maintained subsidiaries in Germany, Ukraine and Switzerland.

== Fleet ==
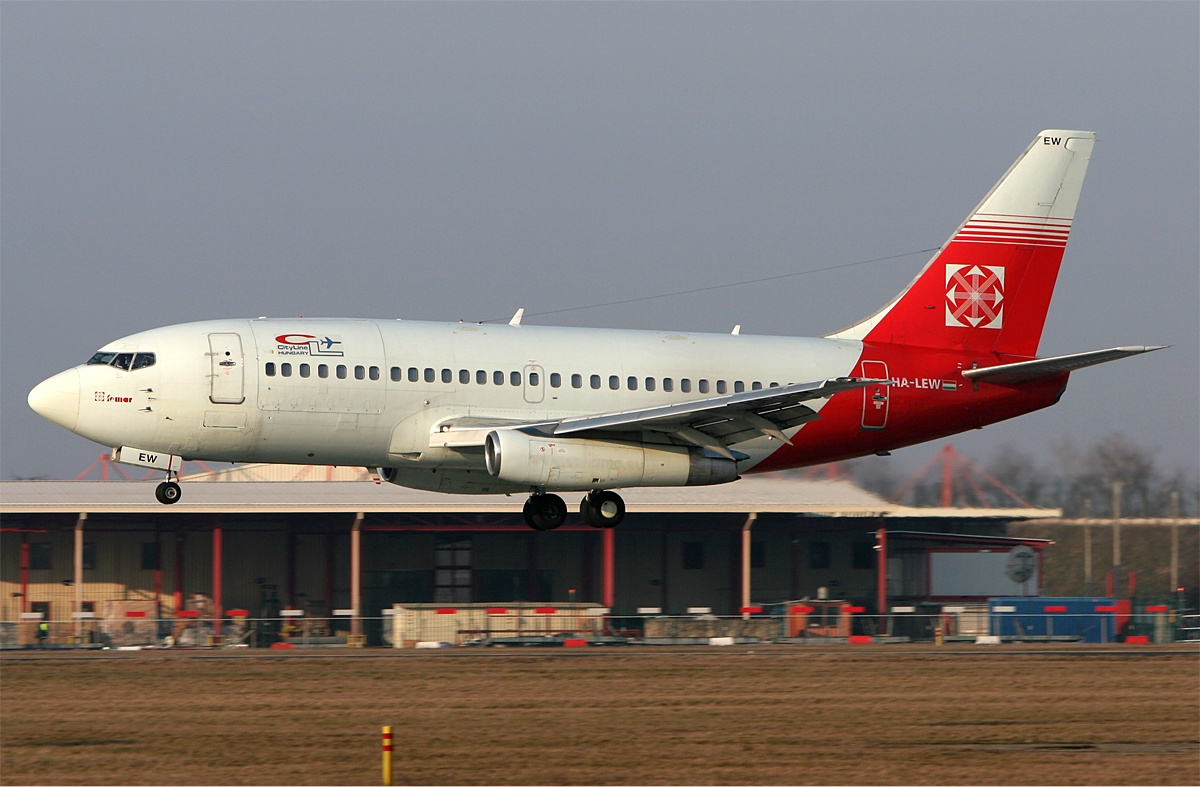
CityLine Hungary Boeing 737-200

The CityLine Hungary fleet consisted of the following aircraft (at March 2018):

CityLine Hungary fleet
Aircraft	In service	Capacity
Antonov An-26B	2	5,500 kg
Fairchild SA227-AC Metro III	1	2,100 kg
Total	3	

Additionally, a sole Boeing 737-200 used for passenger operations was stored in 2011 and having completed its post-overhaul test flight in April 2014, has been sold to Canadian Nolinor Aviation.
