= Zaïre Aero Service =

IATA	ICAO	Call sign
-	ZAI	-
- Founded: 1976
- Ceased operations: 1987
- Operating bases: Kinshasa N’Djili International Airport

Zaïre Aero Service was a passenger and cargo airline based in Zaire (now the Democratic Republic of the Congo). The airline operated the Boeing 707, Fokker F27, Bristol Britannia, Douglas C-54D Skymaster, which operated from 1976 to 1988 before it shut down.

== Company overview ==
The airline was founded in 1976 based out of Kinshasa N’Djili International Airport. The airline ceased operations in 1988, despite its shutdown in 1988 the airline was banned from the EU on June 20 2006 but was removed on October 12 2006.

== Fate of aircraft ==
The airline was known for operating older propeller aircraft and despite being in a profoundly poor aviation environment the airline only suffered one minor accident which was non fatal. In July of 1984 a Boeing 707 was written off but the aircraft at the time was operated by Wolf Aviation.

== Fleet ==
- Boeing 707
- Fokker F27
- Bristol Brittania
- Douglas C54
