= Mont Gabaon Airlines =

IATA	ICAO	Call sign
-	-	-
- Commenced operations: mid June 2024
- Hubs: Goma
- Fleet size: 4
- Destinations: 10

Mont Gabaon Airlines is a Goma-based scheduled carrier.

== History ==
In May 2024 Air Zimbabwe leased an aircraft to the airline. The airline commenced operations in mid June 2024. Initially the airline had Boeing 767 and Shorts 360 aircraft but would later grow to included Boeing 737 and Airbus A320 aircraft. In 2025 the airline added its first Airbus A320 into the fleet, as all of its other aircraft were grounded. The airline in July 2024 added its first ATR 72 to the fleet for regional purposes. In 2026 the DRC air force bought one ERJ 145 from the airline.

== Fleet ==
As of July 2026, Mont Gabaon Airlines operates the following aircraft:

Aircraft	In service	Orders	Passengers
Airbus A320	1	—	
ATR 72-500	1	—	
ATR 72-500F	1	—	
Boeing 737-300SF	1	—	
Total	4	—	
