= Congo Airlines =

Airline of the Democratic Republic of the Congo

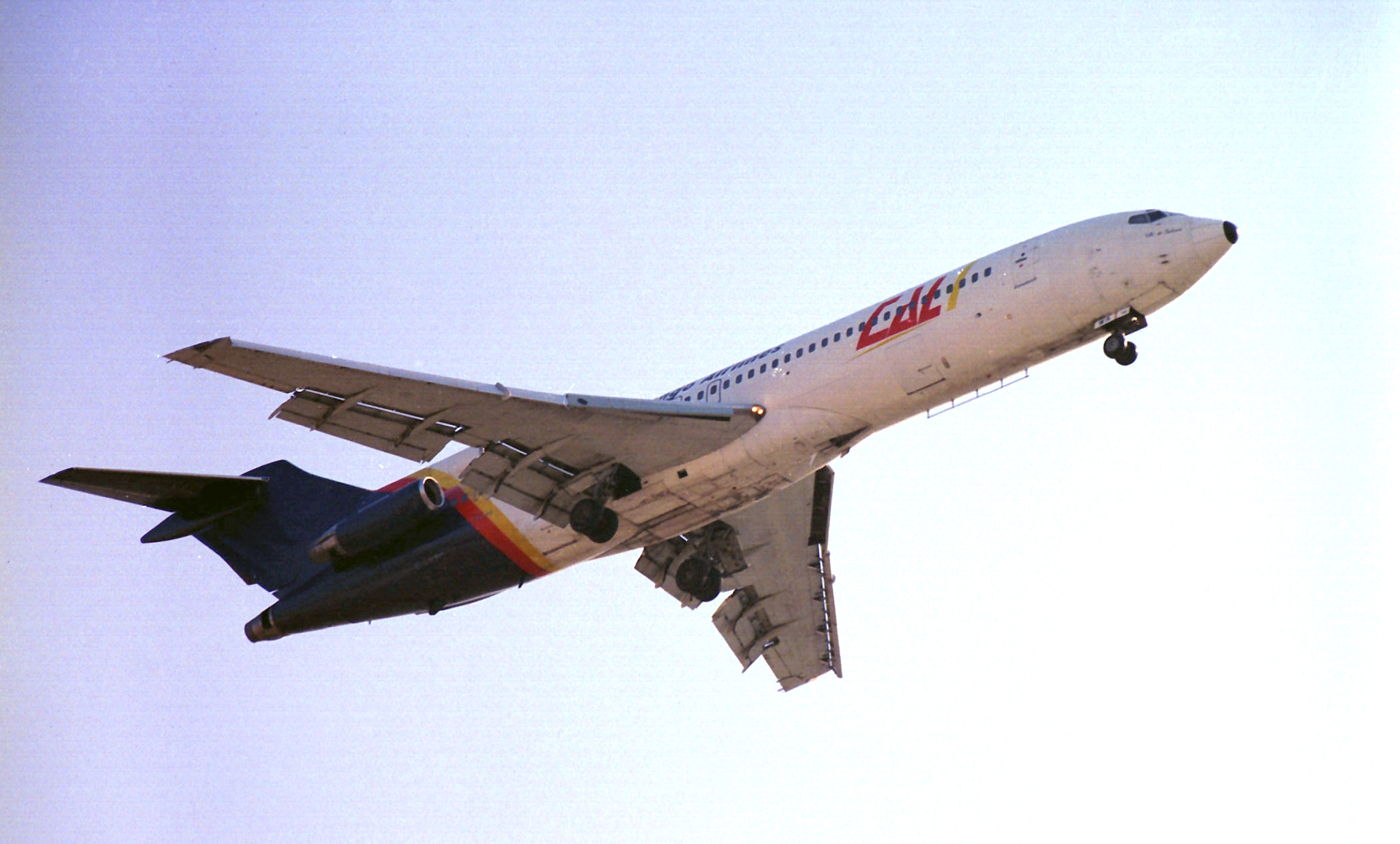
- liftoff
IATA	ICAO	Call sign
EO	ALX	ALLCONGO
- Commenced operations: 1994
- Ceased operations: 1998
- Headquarters: Democratic Republic of the Congo

Congo Airlines was an airline based in the Democratic Republic of the Congo. In 1998, it merged with Zaire Airlines and Zaire Express to form Hewa Bora Airways.

== History ==
Congo Airlines commenced operations in 1994 with 1 Boeing 707 under the Express Cargo name which in 1996 was renamed to the EXPRESS CITY name and began passenger services.

The airline was the airline that took over Shabair in 1997, Shabair operated BAC 1-11, BN 2, HS 748s and Douglas DC 10 aircraft. The airline later was merged into Hewa Bora Airways along with Zaire Airlines, and Zaire Express.

== Fleet ==
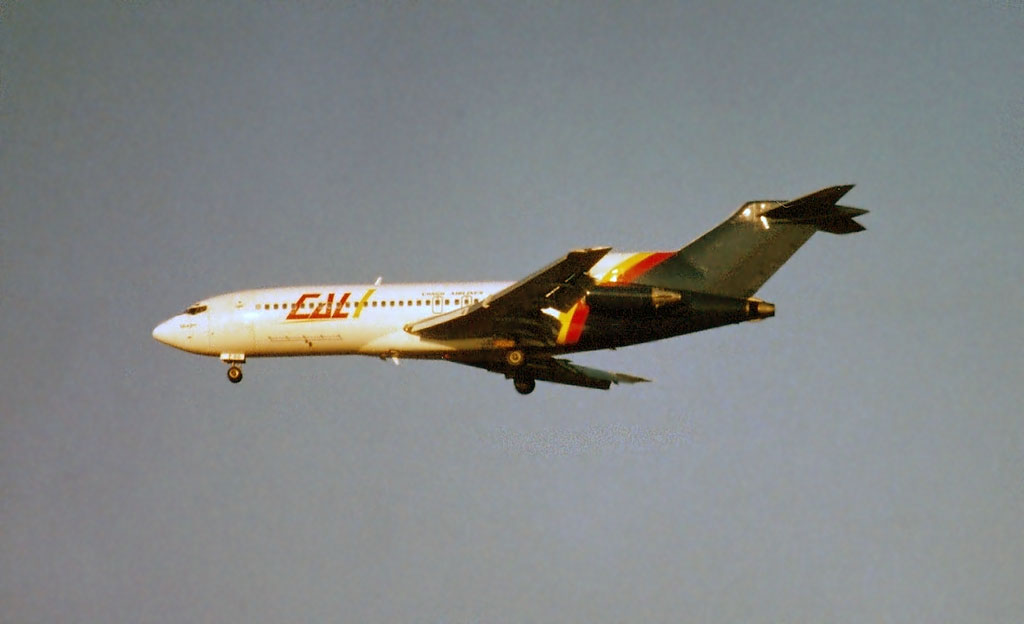
Similar aircraft to the downed one

The airline had a small fleet as it was a short lived carrier

- Boeing 727-227
- Boeing 707-323C
- Boeing 737-200

== Destinations ==
=== Domestic ===
- Kinshasha
- Lubumbashi

== Accident ==
On 10 October 1998, a Congo Airlines Boeing 727 flying a non-scheduled domestic passenger flight from Kindu to Kinshasa was shot down by rebel forces shortly after taking off. The plane later crashed in a jungle killing all 40-41 occupants on board the aircraft.

== See also ==
- Transport in the Democratic Republic of the Congo
- List of defunct airlines of the Democratic Republic of the Congo
