= Flight Express =

Airline of the Democratic Republic of the Congo

IATA	ICAO	Call sign
-	-	-
- Founded: 2004
- Fleet size: 1
- Parent company: Tepavia Trans
- Headquarters: Kinshasa, Democratic Republic of the Congo

Flight Express is an airline based in Kinshasa, Democratic Republic of the Congo. It operates charter services from its base in Kinshasa.

== History ==
The airline was established in 2004 and is wholly owned by Tepavia Trans.

== Fleet ==
As of August 2006 the Flight Express fleet includes:

- 1 – Antonov An-26

== See also ==
- Transport in the Democratic Republic of the Congo
