= Waltair (DR Congo) =

Airline of the Democratic Republic of the Congo

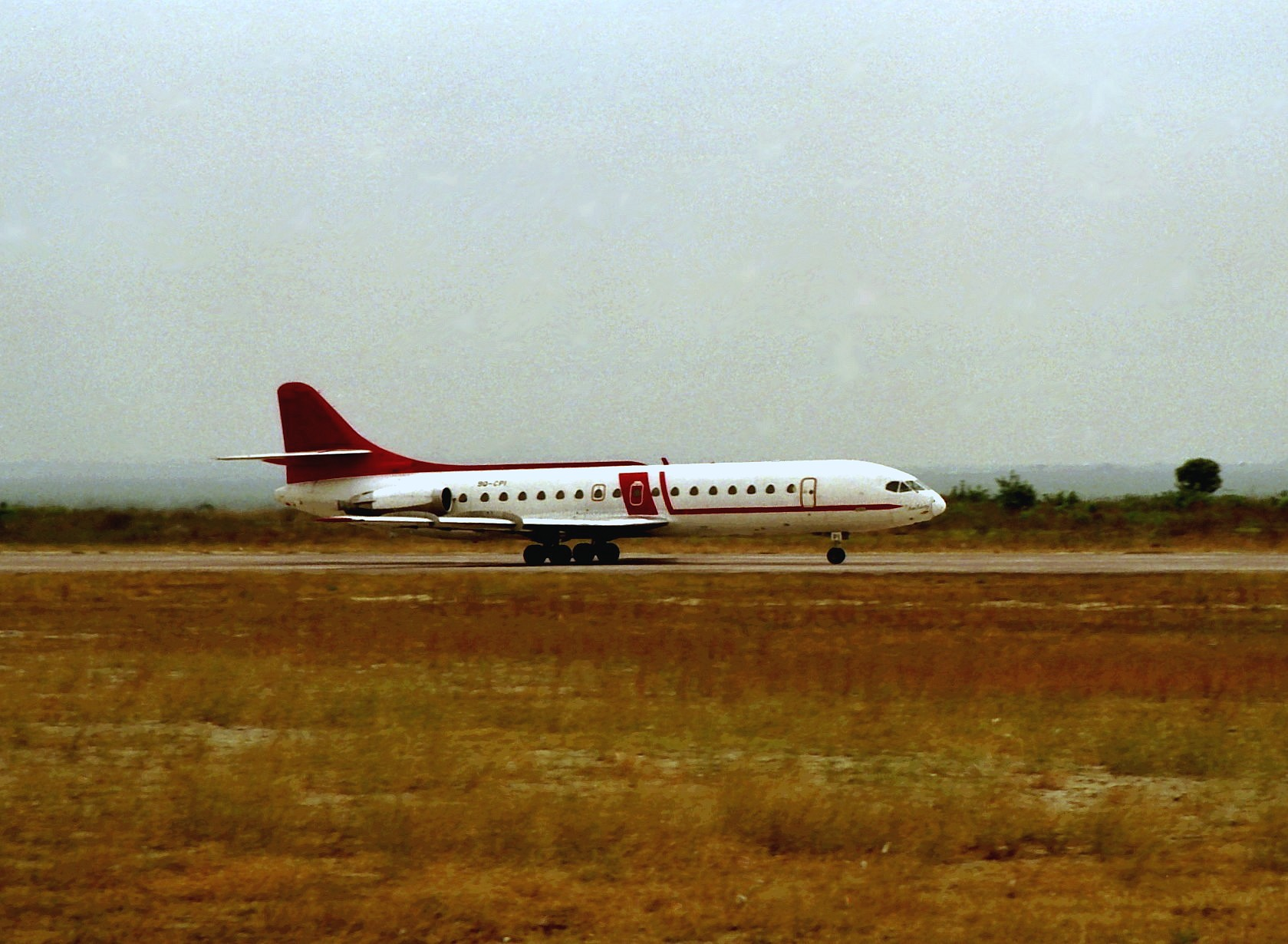
IATA	ICAO	Call sign
-	-	-
- Founded: 1983
- Ceased operations: 2005
- Headquarters: Kinshasa
- Key people: Vincent Gillet, President & CEO

Waltair was an airline operating in the Democratic Republic of the Congo from 1983 to 2005. It was famous for being one of the last airlines in the world using the Sud Caravelle aircraft. Their AOC was revoked by the Congolese Civil Aviation Authority in 2005 and the company was also added to the list of banned airlines in the European Union.

== Fleet ==
Waltair used to operate the following aircraft types

- Douglas DC-8
- Sud Caravelle
- Hawker Siddeley Andover

== See also ==
- Transport in the Democratic Republic of the Congo
