= Kin Avia =

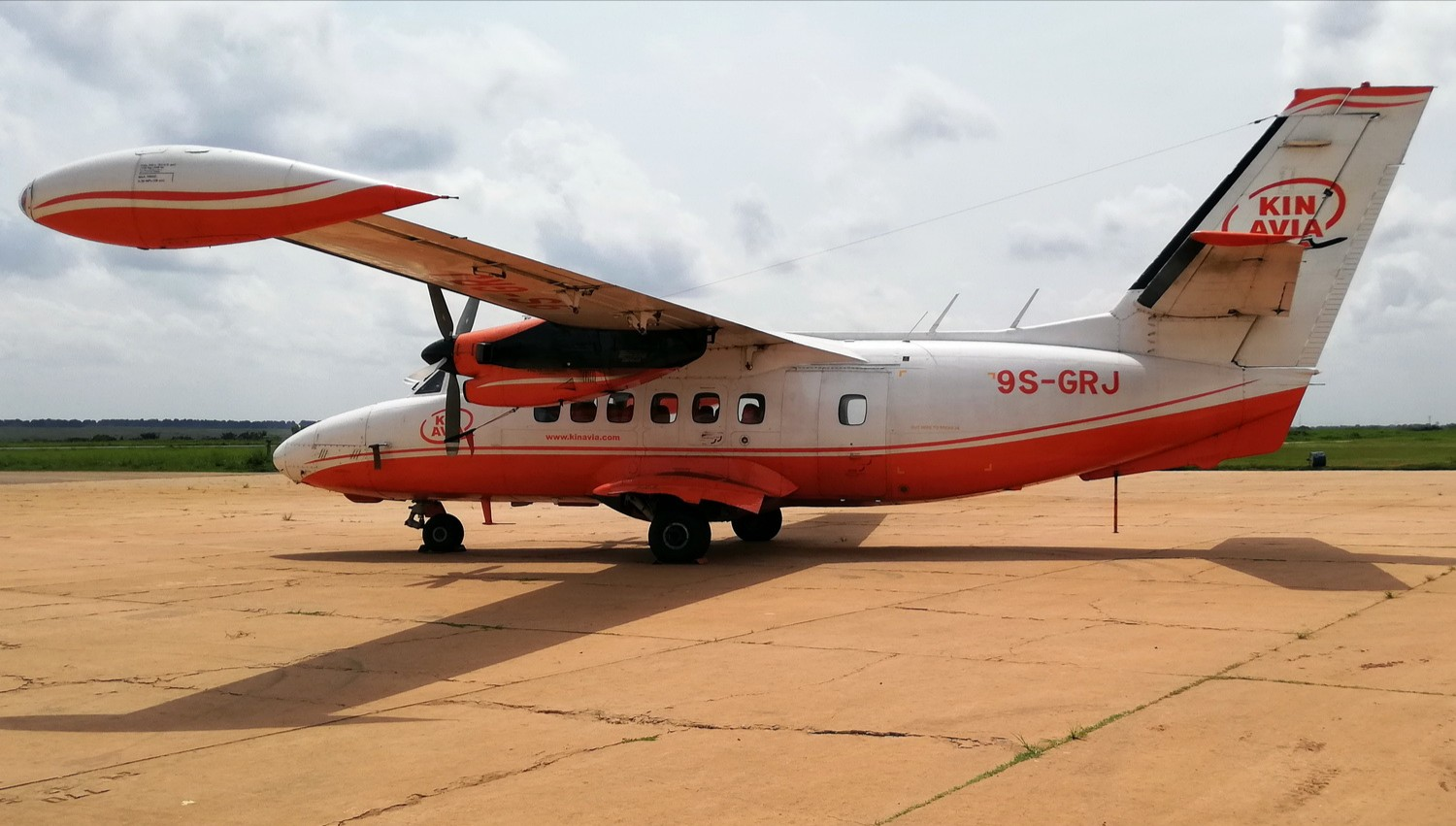
| IATA | ICAO | Call sign |
|---|---|---|
| - | - | - |
- Founded: 2009
- Hubs: N'Dolo Airport
- Fleet size: 4
- Website: https://kinavia.com/en/destinations-et-horaires-des-vols-reguliers-english/

Kin Avia is an airline based in the Democratic Republic of the Congo (DRC) that operates scheduled passenger and charter services from N'Dolo airport. Kin Avia operates aircraft like the LET 410 and Beech 1900D. Like all other DRC based airlines Kin Avia is banned from the European Union. It may have been founded in 2009, in 2016 Air Tropiques merged into Kin Avia. Its main business is charter flights in the DRC and neighbouring countries.

== Fleet ==
As of July 2026, Kin Avia operates the following aircraft:

| Aircraft | In service | Orders | Passengers |
|---|---|---|---|
| Beech 1900D | 1 | — | |
| Total | 1 | — | |

Other aircraft:

- 3x LET 410
- Q100
- Beech King Air

== Accidents and incidents ==
- On August 13, 2021, a Let L-410 of Kin Avia crashed shortly after takeoff killing all three occupants in south Kivu.
- On December 24. 2021, a Kin Avia LET 410 hit a 12-year-old child during takeoff from Ilebo, the aircraft continued its journey without further issues.
