= Lignes Aériennes Congolaises (1997–2003) =

Flag carrier of the Democratic Republic of the Congo

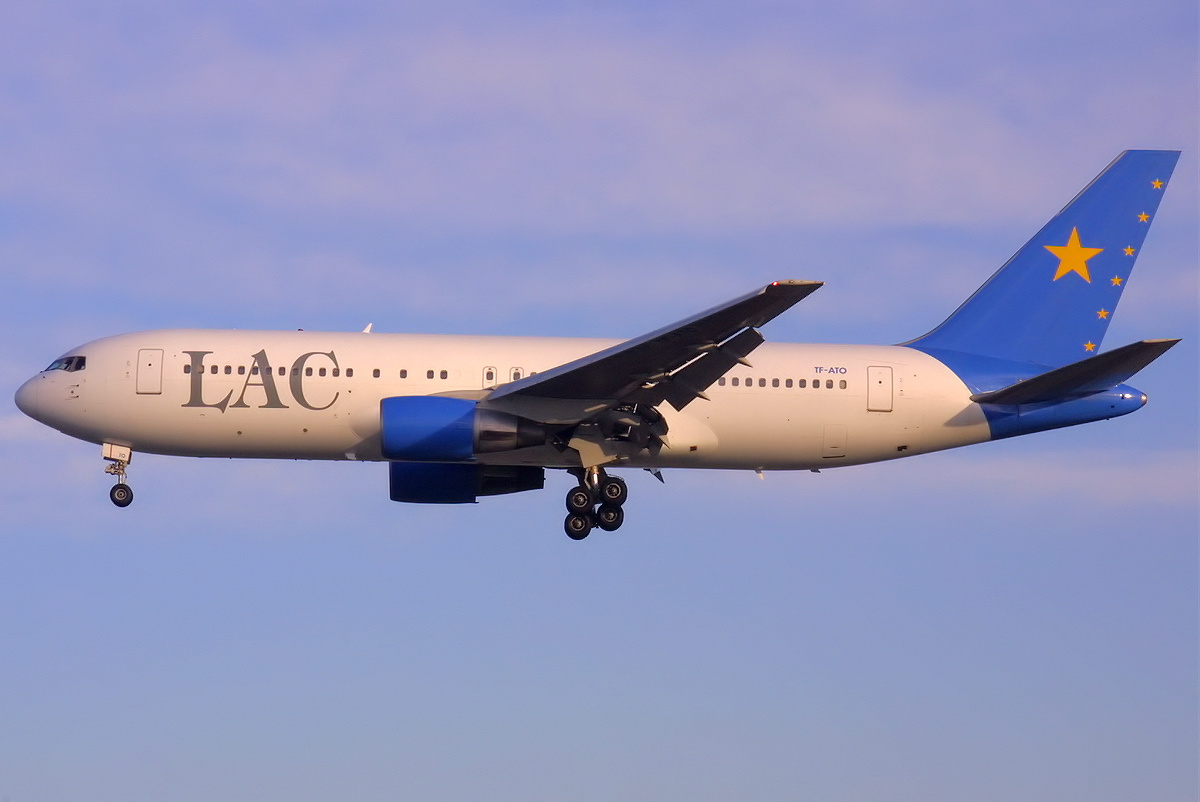
- An Iceland-registered Boeing 767-200ER in Lignes Aériennes Congolaises livery
IATA	ICAO	Call sign
6V	LCG	CONGOLAISE
- Founded: 1997
- Commenced operations: 1997
- Ceased operations: 2003
- Hubs: N'djili Airport
- Headquarters: Kinshasa, Democratic Republic of the Congo

Lignes Aériennes Congolaises (LAC) (English: Congolese Airlines) was the flag carrier of the Democratic Republic of the Congo. It was established in 1997 to succeed the folded Air Zaïre. Halting operations in 1999, it was reactivated for a short period in 2002, only to fold operations permanently in 2003.

== History ==
The airline was set up in 1997, and started operations the same year. It was a reorganisation of Air Zaïre.

In 1999, a contract with the Belgian carrier City Bird to wet-lease a Boeing 767-300ER was signed. Under this agreement, the airline would serve the Kinshasa–Brussels route, with the Belgian carrier codesharing the service. Although the agreement came into being as of April 1999 for a five-year period, it was scrapped in November the same year.

== Destinations ==
Lignes Aériennes Congolaises (LAC) served the following destinations all through its history:

City	Airport code		Airport name	Notes
City	IATA	ICAO	Airport name	Notes
Belgium
Brussels	BRU	EBBR	Brussels Airport	
Democratic Republic of the Congo
Kinshasa	FIH	FZAA	N'djili Airport	Hub
Lubumbashi	FBM	FZQA	Lubumbashi International Airport	
Nigeria
Lagos	LOS	DNMM	Murtala Muhammed International Airport	
South Africa
Johannesburg	JNB	FAJS	OR Tambo International Airport	
Togo
Lomé	LFW	DXXX	Lomé-Tokoin Airport	
Zimbabwe
Harare	HRE	FVHA	Harare International Airport	

=== Codeshare agreements ===
There was a short-lived agreement between City Bird and LAC to codeshare the Kinshasa–Brussels route, operated by LAC but with City Bird aircraft. Since late 2000, LAC codeshared the Harare–Lubumbashi–Kinshasa route, actually operated by Air Zimbabwe; the same agreement enabled Air Zimbabwe to place its code on the Kinshasa–Brussels service, operated by LAC.

== Fleet ==
Lignes Aeriennes Congolaises operated the following aircraft all throughout its history:

- ATR-42-320
- Boeing 707-320C
- Boeing 737-200C
- Boeing 767-200ER
- Douglas DC-8-50

== Accidents and incidents ==
=== Non-fatal hull-losses ===
- 1 January 1999: A Boeing 737-298C, tail number 9Q-CNK, experienced an emergency landing at Kilimanjaro Airport due to an engine failure; the aircraft was ferried to N'djili Airport in March that year, and it has apparently been out of service since then.

== See also ==
- Transport in the Democratic Republic of the Congo
