= Air Zaïre =

National airline of Zaire (1961–1995)

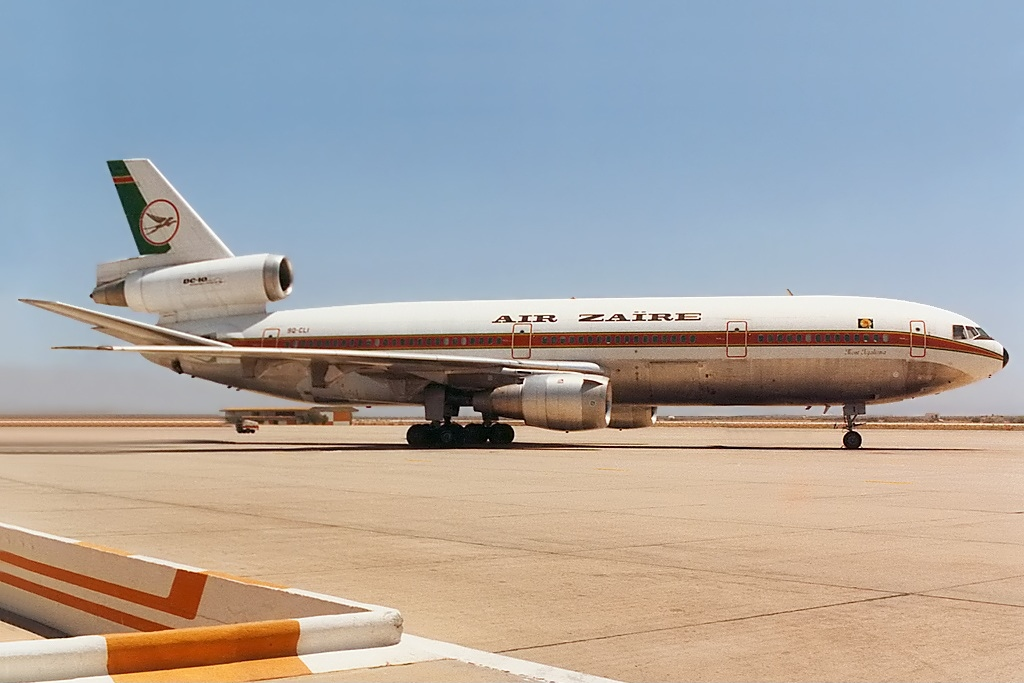
- An Air Zaire Douglas DC-10
IATA	ICAO	Call sign
QC	AZR	—
- Founded: 6 June 1961 (as Air Congo)
- Commenced operations: 29 June 1961
- Ceased operations: 12 June 1995
- Hubs: N'djili Airport
- Secondary hubs: Lubumbashi International Airport
- Headquarters: N'djili Airport, Kinshasa, Zaire

Air Zaïre was the national airline of Zaire. Its head office was located on the grounds of N'djili Airport in Kinshasa.

== History ==
=== Air Congo ===
Air Congo was originally formed in June 1961 as the national airline of the Congolese Republic, with Sabena providing both technical assistance and equipment. Initially, the Congolese government had a 65% participation in the airline, Sabena had a 30% holding, and Air Brousse and Sobelair held the balance.

Services to Belgium were inaugurated in early 1963, linking Léopoldville with Brussels via Rome, using Boeing 707 equipment operated by Sabena on behalf of the carrier. By 1964 the airline was also operating Curtiss C-46s and DC-4s equipment, leased from Aerovias Panama Airways to complement the Sabena-leased aircraft.

Air Congo logo.

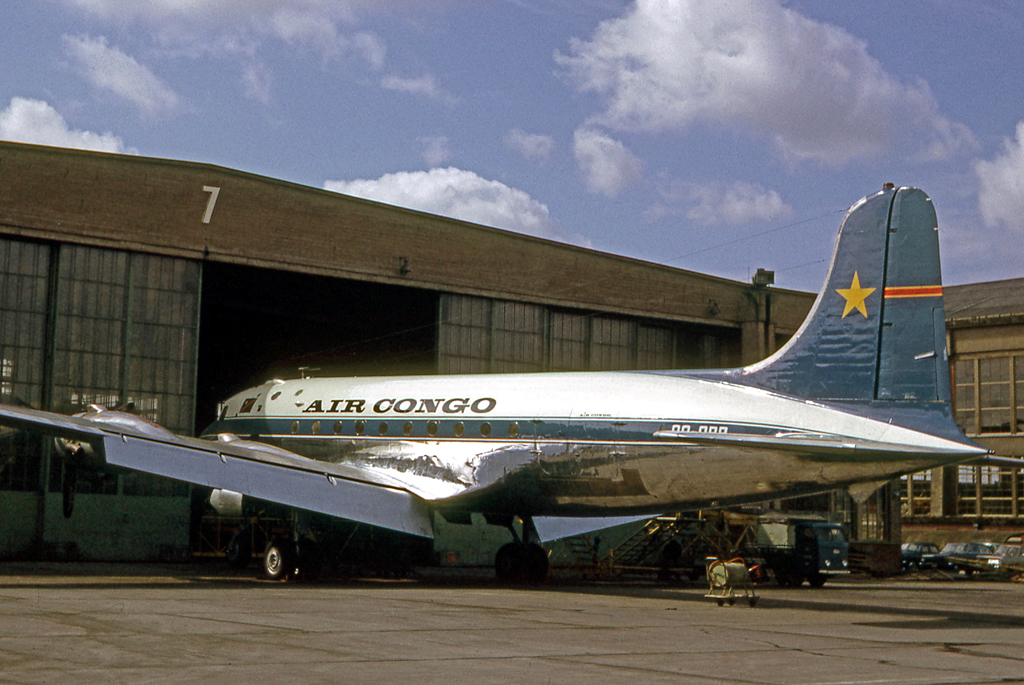
Air Congo Douglas DC-4 Skymaster at Brussels Airport for maintenance during 1965.

After Congolese independence from Belgium in 1960, the Belgian national airline Sabena continued to operate routes in the country. Plans for the formation of a Congolese airline were delayed due to the Congo Crisis; however, in January 1961 a protocol was signed with Sabena for the creation of a limited liability company to be named Air Congo. On 1961 the company was formed, and incorporated on 28 June with Sabena providing technical assistance and personnel. The Congolese government held a 65% percent stake, with Sabena holding 30%, and Air Brousse and Sobelair holding the balance. The initial fleet of Air Congo consisted of Douglas DC-3s, Douglas DC-4s and Douglas DC-6Bs; the first international destinations served by the carrier were Entebbe, Luanda, Nairobi, and Ndola. Sabena and Air Brousse continued their operations but these were ceased when Air Congo began operations on 21 June 1961. Whilst the airline was granted exclusive rights to operate scheduled domestic and international flights, it also received subsidies from the government in Léopoldville for any shortfall in loans which had been approved by the government.

Part of the contract with Sabena saw the Belgian airline train Air Congo personnel for a six-year period, and by the end of 1962 Air Congo had 2,400 employees, of which some 1,100 were seconded from Sabena. By this time the airlines' destinations included Entebbe, Lagos, Nairobi, Ndola, Salisbury and Usumbura. Jet service to Brussels was inaugurated in March 1963 utilising a Boeing 707 which was leased from Sabena, and in April 1963 the airline joined the International Air Transport Association, becoming the 94th overall member.

The airline signed an agreement with French airline Union des Transports Aériens (UTA) in January 1964, which saw the two airlines cooperating on flights between Africa and Europe. UTA operated a Johannesburg-Salisbury-Léopoldville-Paris service with Douglas DC-8 equipment, and Air Congo operated Boeing 707s on the Léopoldville-Douala-Paris route. The airline added four Beech Barons in October 1964 in order to provide feeder services, and in November 1964, Zambia Airways reintroduced the Ndola-Élisabethville route which was formerly operated by Central African Airways. Zambia Airways operated the flight on Mondays, and Air Congo operated the same service on Fridays. On 29 November 1964, a Douglas DC-4 of the airline, leased from Belgian International Aviation Services crashed upon take-off from Stanleyville, killing seven of the fifteen people on board. It was initially reported the aircraft, which was carrying Belgian soldiers, may have been shot down by rebels, but it was later revealed the aircraft had hit an empty fuel drum on the runway upon taking off.

Following the 1965 coup which brought Mobutu Sésé Seko to power, most of Sabena's property in the country was seized, and the Belgian airline had its traffic rights at Élisabethville cancelled. In addition, the Congolese government seized funds that were due to be paid by Air Congo to Sabena, and other funds earned by Sabena in the country. Foreign ownership of the airline was eliminated at the same time, with the Congolese government holding a seventy percent share, the Institut National Securite Sociale holding eight percent, and local Congolese concerns holding the remainder. At the time, the fleet comprised two Douglas DC-6s, eight DC-4s, eleven DC-3s, two Curtiss C-46s, three Beech 18s, five Beech Barons, one Piper PA-23 Aztec and one Cessna 310.

In 1967 the airline ordered two Sud Aviation Caravelles for delivery in October 1967 and the summer of 1968, and on 12 May 1967 a BAC One Eleven, on a one-year lease from Laker Airways entered service on the airlines' routes. The airline operated a service from Kinshasa to Brussels in a pool arrangement with Sabena until June 1967. On 25 November 1967, a Douglas DC-8 joined the airline's fleet, and it flew on routes from Lubumbashi-Kinshasa-Brussels-Paris or Rome, with the last sector being flown on alternate weeks. The Caravelles were introduced on regional flights from Kinshasa-Lagos and Kinshasa-Bangui-Fort-Lamy. The airline also operated twice weekly flights on the route Kinshasa-Entebbe-Nairobi-Dar es Salaam-Lubumbashi-Lusaka-Lubumbashi-Kinshasa. The DC-6s operated on regional routes linking Kinshasa-Goma-Bujumbura-Entebbe-Nairobi. The airline operated the DC-3s, DC-4s, and DC-6s to 26 domestic destinations, and the smaller Beech aircraft were operated to 27 other domestic destinations. At the end of 1967, an agreement was signed with Fokker for the purchase of ten Fokker F 27-600s. A Douglas DC-3 operated by the airline crashed on 15 February 1970, under unknown circumstances. In October, Pan American World Airways began managing the airline, under a three-year management contract. The American airline provided 14 specialists to the airline in order to assist with technical and operational issues. There was special emphasis placed on the training of Congolese nationals to run the airline, and in 1970 two Douglas DC-8s were bought from Pan Am.

=== Air Zaïre ===
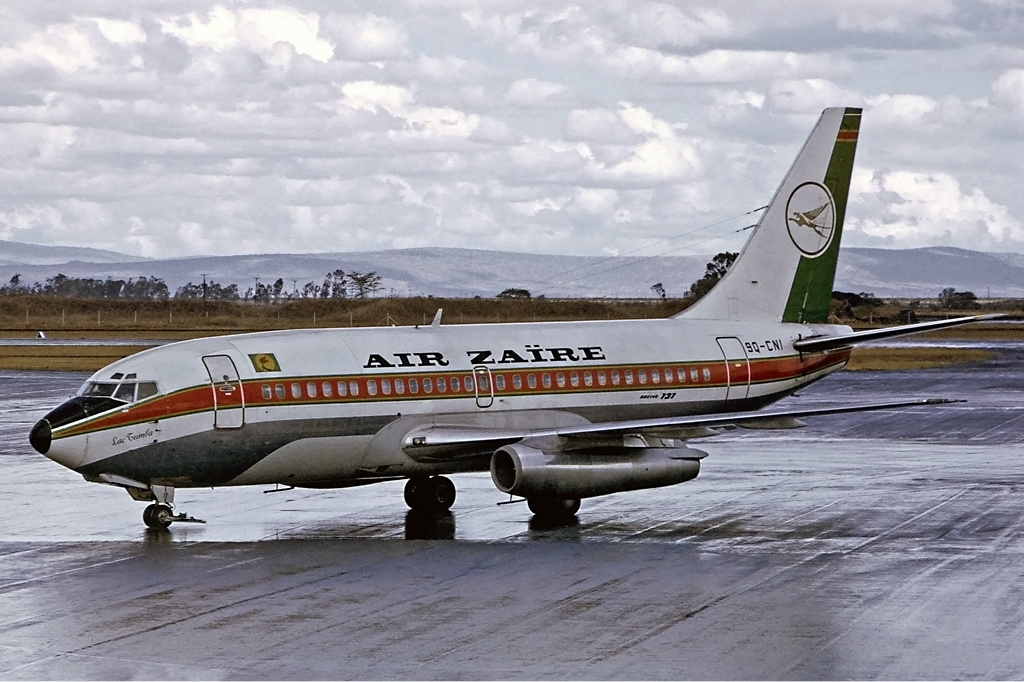
An Air Zaïre Boeing 737-200 at Jomo Kenyatta International Airport. (1975)

On 27 October 1971, the country changed its name from the Democratic Republic of the Congo to the Republic of Zaire, and Air Congo changed its name to Air Zaïre. In the same year, the airline placed an order for three Boeing 737-200s, and occasionally operated Lockheed L-100 Hercules on lease from the Zairian government for cargo operations. The airline ordered two McDonnell Douglas DC-10s and five Boeing 737s on 3 January 1973. The DC-10s were delivered to the airline in 1973, and in February 1973, the airline announced that it was to acquire a Boeing 747-100. The 747 was operated on a lease and was only operational with the airline for approximately a year. It was during this period that Zairian President Mobutu gained renown for commandeering aircraft belonging to the airline in order to transport himself and his entourage on shopping trips to Europe. In the spring of 1973, it was reported that when traveling to West Germany, Mobutu requisitioned the Boeing 747 for himself, and utilized one of the airlines' DC-10s to transport his wife, leaving the airline short of jets for its own services.

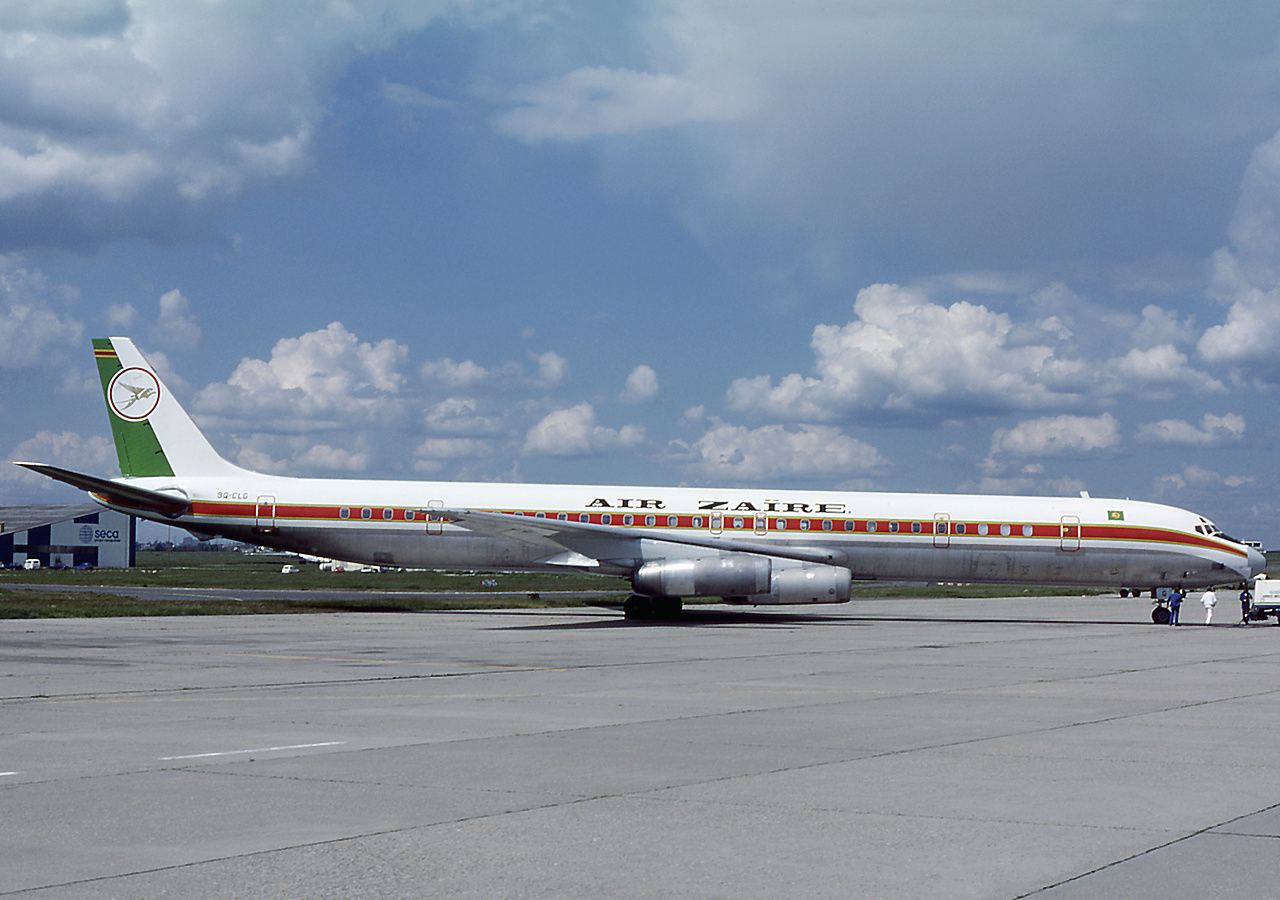
An Air Zaïre Douglas DC-8-63 at Le Bourget Airport. (1986)

A DC-4 of the airline was involved in an accident at Gemena on 7 April 1974, and on 9 January 1975 a Fokker 27 was involved at Boende, killing one person on the ground. On 3 March 1976, a Fokker 27 was written off in an accident in Angola. The three Boeing 737-200s which were ordered in 1973 joined the fleet during the 1970s, replacing some Fokkers and Caravelles. The addition of the Boeing twinjet allowed to network expansion with the addition of routes to Madrid, Abidjan, Bangui, Bujumbura, Conakry, Dakar, Libreville, Lomé and Luanda. The airline ordered four Fokker F 27–500 turboprops in January 1981, however, the early 1980s saw the airline undergoing financial difficulties, and in order to ease pressure on the financial resources of the airline, one DC-8, one 737-200 and two F 27s were taken out of service. Due to the financial crisis, the airline also suspended all international flights, with the exception of those on the Kinshasa-Lagos-Brussels route. In September 1983, Mobutu announced an austerity program, which would see some forty-seven parastatals, including Air Zaïre, being liquidated or reorganized to operate upon a commercial basis. The government announced that staffing levels at the airline would be reduced by 6,500 to 2,500, and that a forty percent stake in the airline would be offered to prospective buyers. In early 1985, the government signed a deal with the Israeli Tamman Group, giving the foreign company a forty percent stake in the airline, in return for a US$400 million investment in Zaire's transport and pharmaceutical industries, however, the deal did not materialise.

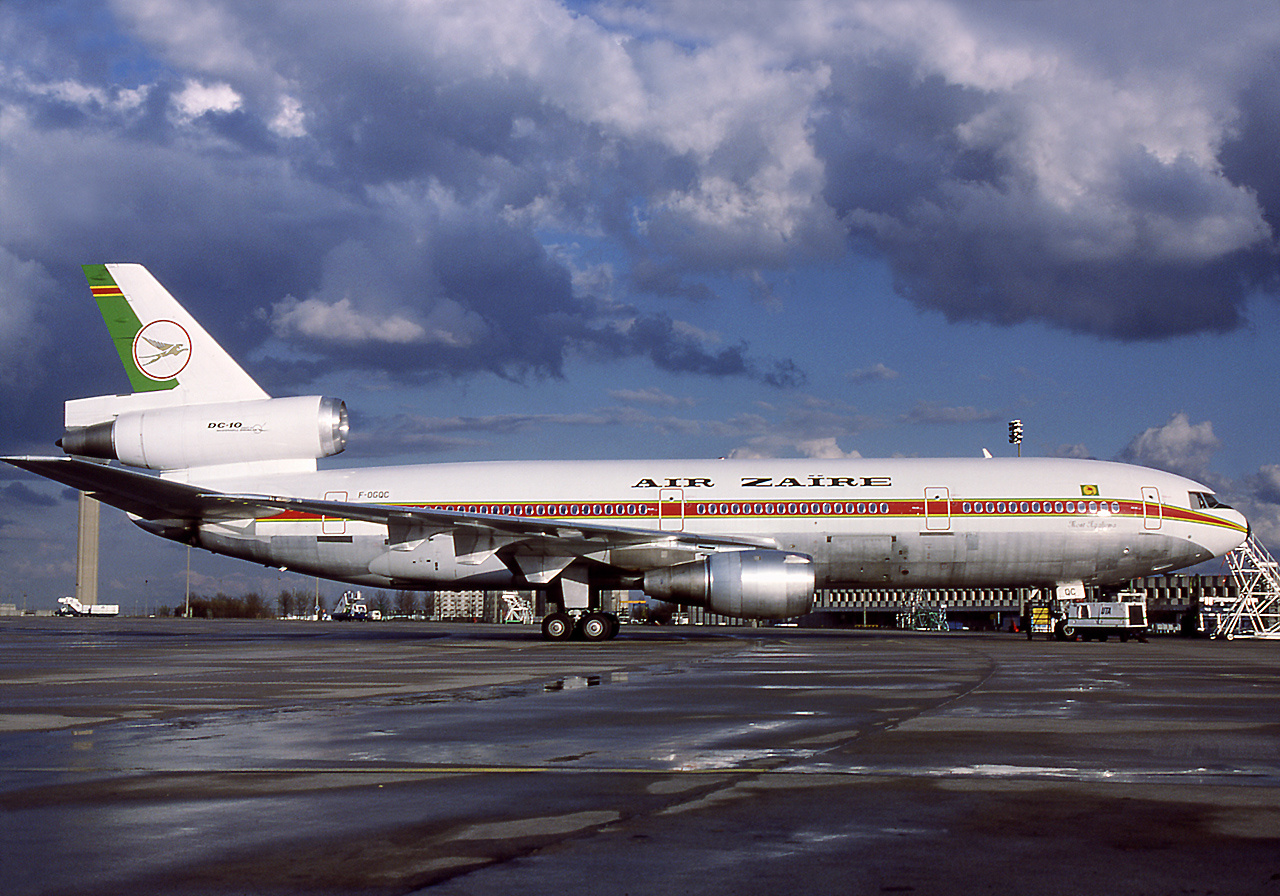
An Air Zaïre McDonnell Douglas DC-10-30 at Charles de Gaulle Airport. (1986)

By 1985 the airline was losing passengers, so much so that private carrier Scibe Airlift was carrying more domestic passengers than it, and the Zairian government contracted French airline UTA to manage the airline for a six-year period. In June 1985 one of the DC-10s was offered to sale and was eventually bought by British Caledonian. As negotiations to end apartheid in South Africa began in 1990, a number of African airlines which had previously flown to South Africa resumed flights; Air Zaïre began the operation of flights to Johannesburg in April 1991.

The airline was declared bankrupt on 12 June 1995 by a Brussels court after incurring debts to the value of BFr1 billion, of which Sabena was a major creditor. The ruling was disputed by President Mobutu, who said that a Belgian court did not have the right to declare a Zairian company bankrupt and threatened to close Sabena's office in Kinshasa in retaliation. In response, the Belgian government offered the bankrupt carrier's landing rights to Scibe Airlift, an airline that was owned by a Mobutu family member. In 1998, it was reported that the airline had a total debt of BFr1.5 billion, including 700 million which was for social liabilities.

=== New Air Zaïre ===
After the collapse of Air Zaïre, Sabena entered into a partnership with the Zairian government to create a new airline to be called New Air Zaïre. The new airline would operate domestic services, whilst Sabena would utilize its traffic rights and operate international flights. Sabena, which was partnered with Swissair and South African investors, and was initially offered a controlling 51% stake, purchased a 49.5% stake for a reported BFr100 million; the government would hold the controlling 50.5% stake.

The airline was reorganized into Lignes Aériennes Congolaises, which began flights in 1997, the same year when Zaïre was renamed as the Democratic Republic of Congo.

== Fleet ==
Aircraft in use at the time of Air Zaïre's collapse in 1995
Aircraft	In service
McDonnell Douglas DC-10	3
Boeing 737-200	7
Boeing 747-100	1
Douglas DC-8	5
Total	16

== Accidents and incidents ==
- On 18 August 1968, Douglas DC-3D 9Q-CUM of Air Congo was destroyed by fire at N'djili Airport, Kinshasa.
- On 15 February 1970, Douglas C-47A 9Q-CUP of Air Congo was reported to have been written off at an unknown location.

== See also ==
- Transport in the Democratic Republic of the Congo
- Canadian Airways Congo
