= N'Dolo Airport =

Kinshasa N'Dolo Airport Aéroport de N'Dolo
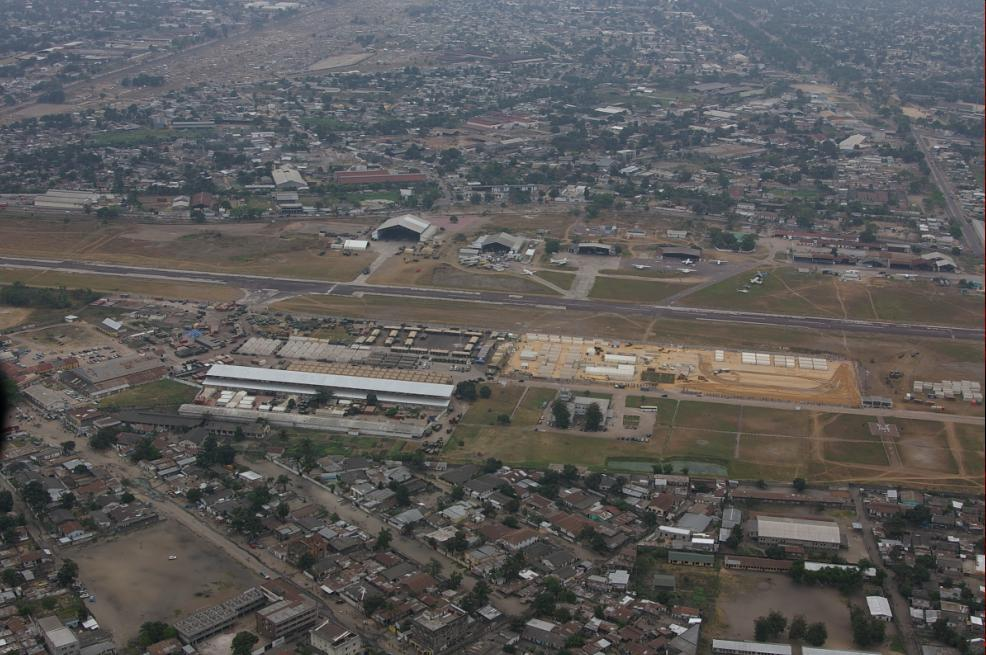
- Aerial view of N'Dolo Airport in 2006
- IATA: NLO; ICAO: FZAB

Summary
- Airport type: Civil
- Operator: Government
- Location: Kinshasa, Democratic Republic of the Congo
- Elevation AMSL: 915 ft (279 m)
- Coordinates: 04°19′36″S 015°19′38″E

Map
- Location of Airport in Democratic Republic of the Congo

Runways
Direction	Length		Surface
Direction	m	ft	Surface
08/26	1,680	5,512	Asphalt
- Google Maps

N'Dolo Airport (IATA: NLO, ICAO: FZAB), also known as Ndolo Airport, is a secondary airport in the city of Kinshasa, Democratic Republic of the Congo, located in the commune of Barumbu near the city center.

The Aviation militaire de la Force Publique was established here in October 1940 with requisitioned aircraft.

The airline Air Kasaï had its head office on the airport property.

Runways are limited to aircraft under 15,000 kilograms (33,000 lb) since the disastrous crash of January 8, 1996, in which an Antonov An-32 aborted takeoff and overran the runway into a market.

Runway length includes a 315 metres (1,033 ft) displaced threshold on Runway 08.

== Airlines and destinations ==
Airlines	Destinations
Kin Avia	Bandundu, Kikwit, Matadi, Nioki
Mission Aviation Fellowship	Charter: Bokoro, Semendua, Vanga

== Accidents and incidents ==
- On 8 January 1996, an An-32 freighter crashed into a crowded marketplace in Kinshasa, Zaire, resulting in the deaths of approximately 237 people on the ground. The crew attempted to abort the takeoff at Kinshasa-N'Dolo Airport after the aircraft failed to gain height. Four of the six crew members survived. Overloading was cited as a possible cause.

== See also ==
- Transport in the Democratic Republic of the Congo
- List of airports in the Democratic Republic of the Congo
