= Wimbi Dira Airways =

Airline of the Democratic Republic of the Congo

| IATA | ICAO | Call sign |
|---|---|---|
| 9C | WDA | WIMBI DIRA |
- Founded: 2003
- Ceased operations: 2014
- Hubs: N'djili Airport
- Fleet size: 1
- Destinations: 12
- Headquarters: Kinshasa, Democratic Republic of the Congo
- Key people: David Mavinga (General Manager)

Wimbi Dira Airways was a scheduled and charter, passenger and cargo airline based in Kinshasa, Democratic Republic of the Congo. It served the country's main cities. As of May 2014 all of their planes were reported to be in storage.

== History ==
The airline was established in 2003 and operations started on 13 August 2003. The company is managed by David Mavinga (General Manager) and employed 270 staff.

=== Banned Airline Status ===
This airline appears on the E.U. list of prohibited carriers. This means that it may not operate operations of any kind within the European Union community. This is due to the airline not meeting the safety standards set out by the European Union.

== Services ==
Domestic scheduled destinations to (as of July 2010):

- Democratic Republic of the Congo
  - Gbadolite - Gbadolite Airport
  - Gemena - Gemena Airport
  - Goma - Goma International Airport
  - Isiro - Matari Airport
  - Kalemie - Kalemie Airport
  - Kananga - Kananga Airport
  - Kindu - Kindu Airport
  - Kinshasa - N'djili Airport Hub
  - Kisangani - Bangoka International Airport
  - Lubumbashi - Lubumbashi International Airport
  - Mbandaka - Mbandaka Airport
  - Mbuji-Mayi - Mbuji Mayi Airport

== Fleet ==
As of March 2012, Wimbi Dira Airways has no active aircraft in their fleet, all have either been leased out or withdrawn. Wimbi Dira Airways has been operating the following aircraft:

- 4 Boeing 707
- 1 Boeing 727
- 1 Douglas DC-3
- 4 Douglas DC-9
- 1 McDonnell Douglas MD-80
- 3 Antonov AN-12

== Accidents and incidents ==
- On 4 October 2005 an Antonov 12V (9Q-CWC) departed Kisangani Airport with around 100 D. R. Congolese soldiers. The aircraft had a hard landing at Aru Airport, causing the landing gear to penetrate the cabin. During the evacuation two passengers ran into the still-operating propellers; both of the passengers died as a result.
