= Air Congo (2024) =

Flag carrier airline of DR Congo

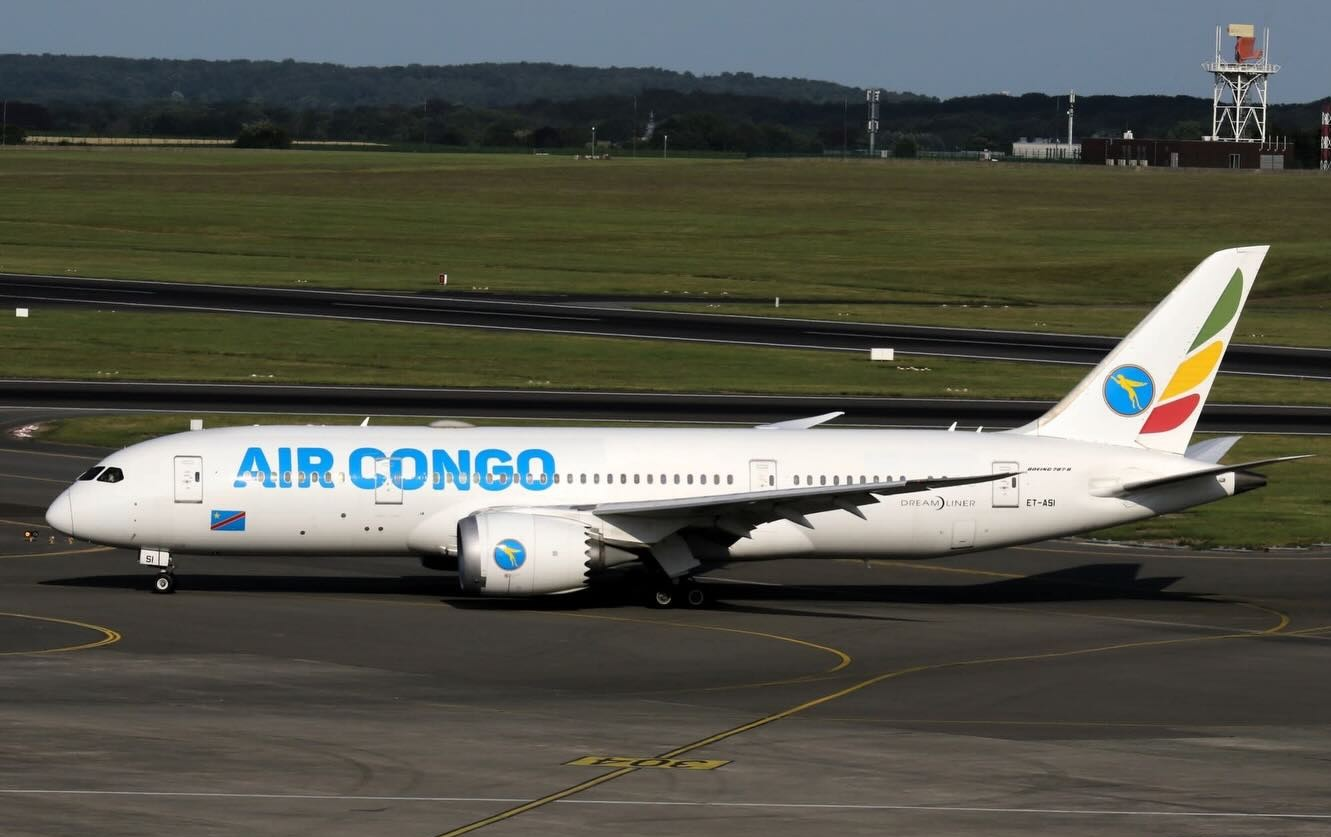
- Air Congo Boeing 787-8
IATA	ICAO	Call sign
4H	DRC	LEO PARC
- Founded: 2024
- Commenced operations: 1 December 2024; 23 months ago
- Hubs: N'djili Airport
- Fleet size: 7
- Destinations: 20
- Owner: DRC Government (51%); Ethiopian Airlines (49%)
- Headquarters: Kinshasa, DR Congo
- Key people: Mesfin Biru Weldegeorgis (director general)
- Total equity: US$ 40 million
- Website: www.air-congo.com/en/home

Air Congo S.A. is the national flag carrier airline of the Democratic Republic of the Congo, headquartered in Kinshasa and operating from its primary hub at N'djili International Airport. Launched on 1 December 2024, in partnership with Ethiopian Airlines, the airline operates flights to 20 destinations across Central Africa, West Africa, Southern Africa, and Europe.

Formed to replace the state-owned and previous flag carrier Congo Airways, which had been banned from flying into the European Union, Air Congo's regional network spans major domestic destinations and key African cities, including Lubumbashi, Douala, Cotonou, and Johannesburg. Internationally, long-haul operations to European destinations began with a route from Kinshasa to Brussels. This expanding route framework is designed to integrate the Democratic Republic of the Congo more deeply into global and regional aviation networks.

== Destinations ==
Country	City	Airport	Notes	Refs
Belgium	Brussels	Brussels Airport		
Benin	Cotonou	Cotonou Cadjehoun International Airport		
Cameroon	Douala	Douala International Airport		
Democratic Republic of the Congo	Beni	Beni-Mavivi Airport		
Democratic Republic of the Congo	Bunia	Bunia Airport		
Democratic Republic of the Congo	Gbadolite	Gbadolite Airport		
Democratic Republic of the Congo	Gemena	Gemena Airport		
Democratic Republic of the Congo	Goma	Goma International Airport		
Democratic Republic of the Congo	Isiro	Isiro-Matari Airport		
Democratic Republic of the Congo	Kalemie	Kalemie Airport		
Democratic Republic of the Congo	Kananga	Kananga Airport		
Democratic Republic of the Congo	Kinshasa	N'djili International Airport	Hub	
Democratic Republic of the Congo	Kisangani	Kisangani Bangoka International Airport		
Democratic Republic of the Congo	Kolwezi	Kolwezi International Airport		
Democratic Republic of the Congo	Lubumbashi	Lubumbashi International Airport		
Democratic Republic of the Congo	Mbuji-Mayi	Mbuji-Mayi International Airport		
Democratic Republic of the Congo	Mbandaka	Mbandaka Airport		
Democratic Republic of the Congo	Muanda	Muanda Airport		
Ethiopia	Addis Ababa	Bole International Airport	Operated by Ethiopian Airlines	
France	Paris	Charles de Gaulle Airport		
South Africa	Johannesburg	O. R. Tambo International Airport		

Air Congo intends to expand its fleet to eight Boeing 737s and two Boeing 787s to service domestic, regional, and international routes, including Paris, Brussels, Dubai, Johannesburg, Luanda, and Dar es Salaam. The airline expanded its network in early 2026, announcing service to Cotonou, Douala, Johannesburg, and Kampala. Its inaugural international flight connected Kinshasa and Johannesburg (via Lubumbashi) on 22 March with the arrival of a third Boeing 737-800 just days prior, followed by the launch of flights to Cotonou via Douala on 28 March.

In June 2026, the airline finalized its initial plans for international flight operations. On 1 July 2026, Air Congo commenced weekday flights to Brussels Airport using an Ethiopian Airlines Boeing 787 Dreamliner secured via an ACMI wet-lease agreement. Delivered a day prior, the aircraft's maiden voyage as Air Congo flight 4H/ET98 marked the return of a Congolese carrier to European airspace after an 18-year absence, following the termination of Hewa Bora Airways' European route on 11 April 2008. The launch of European routes mark a return to direct competition with established European carriers such as Brussels Airlines and Air France.

== Fleet ==
As of July 2026, Air Congo operates the following aircraft:

Aircraft	In service	Orders	Passengers				Notes
Aircraft	In service	Orders	J	W	Y	Total	Notes
ATR 72-600	1	—					
Boeing 737-800	3	—					
Boeing 787-8	1	—					Leased from Ethiopian Airlines
Boeing 787-9	1	—	30	36	226	292	Leased from MIAT Mongolian Airlines
Total	6	—					

=== Fleet development ===
Air Congo aimed to operate a fleet of overall six aircraft within a year.

=== Former fleet ===
As of August 2025, Air Congo operated 2 ATR 72-600, 3 Boeing 737-800.

== See also ==
- Congo Airways
