= Hewa Bora Airways Flight 122 =

2008 aviation accident

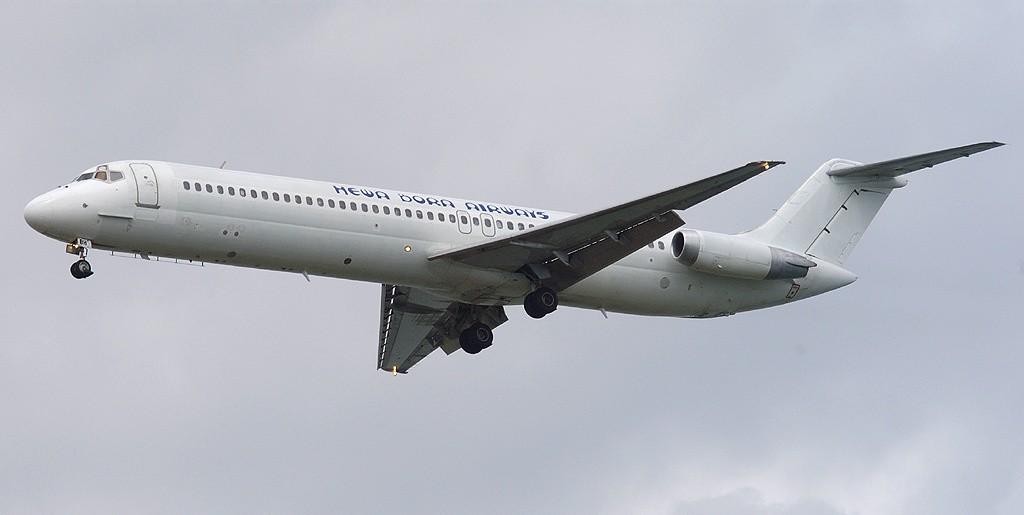
- the DC-9 involved in the accident, under a previous registration and livery

Accident
- Date: 15 April 2008 (14:45 UTC)
- Summary: Engine failure on takeoff leading to runway overrun
- Site: Goma International Airport, Democratic Republic of the Congo; 1°40′53″S 29°14′22″E
- Total fatalities: 40
- Total injuries: 111

Aircraft
- Aircraft type: McDonnell Douglas DC-9-51
- Operator: Hewa Bora Airways
- IATA flight No.: EO122
- ICAO flight No.: ALX122
- Call sign: ALLCONGO 122
- Registration: 9Q-CHN
- Flight origin: Goma International Airport
- Stopover: Bangoka International Airport
- Destination: N'djili Airport
- Occupants: 94
- Passengers: 86
- Crew: 8
- Fatalities: 3
- Injuries: 40
- Survivors: 91

Ground casualties
- Ground fatalities: 37
- Ground injuries: 71

On 15 April 2008, Hewa Bora Airways Flight 122, a McDonnell Douglas DC-9-51 plane crashed into a residential and market area of Goma of the Democratic Republic of the Congo immediately south of Goma International Airport.

== Background ==
The eastern part of the DRC had been war-torn for decades, as various factions sought control of mineral resources. Goma was a center for the air shipping of cassiterite (tin oxide ore) from Nord-Kivu.

The European Union placed all DRC airlines on its list of airlines banned in the EU. HBA has held a single exemption for a single Boeing 767-266ER tail number 9Q-CJD, construction number 193H-1209, but that too had been removed on 11 April 2008. Very similar crashes in the DRC the previous October in the capital, Kinshasa and in 1996 also came down in residential or market areas. Because the DRC has so little passable roadway, most freight is moved by air and markets are common near airstrips.

HBA operated a number of different aircraft types, none of them modern. This aircraft was 31 years old.

Goma is on the volcanically active Great African Rift Valley. One volcano, Nyiragongo, is so close that its January 2002 eruption destroyed the north end of runway 18/36, leaving just 2 kilometres (1.2 mi) for aircraft operations. Goma International is at 1,551 metres (5,089 ft) elevation, and the mid-afternoon temperature is about 22 °C (72 °F). These factors would reduce the Maximum Takeoff Weight (MTOW) on the 1995 metre runway from 55 tonnes (121,000 lb) to less than 45 tonnes (99,000 lb). Another report states that only 1600 to 1800 m of the runway was usable. If the lower of these figures were correct, then the corresponding MTOW would be reduced another 3 tonnes (7,000 lb).

== Crash ==
The aircraft was departing Goma bound for Kisangani. According to the director of the RVA, the number one engine caught fire after 300 metres (980 ft). The fire developed into an uncontained engine failure. The aircraft subsequently overran the runway and crashed at 14:30 local time (12:30 UTC), impacting concrete homes, shops and market stalls. The crash site was located at the Birere market on l'Avenue du 20 Mai, just beyond the south end of runway 18.

== Casualties ==
There were 86 passengers and eight crew members aboard the flight. Three of the passengers and 37 people on the ground were killed in the accident. A further 40 passengers and 71 people on the ground were injured.

Greek Orthodox Metropolitan bishop of Central Africa Ignatios was among the survivors of the crash. Another non-Congolese survivor was an Alcatel engineer named Selami Mordeniz. The fourth day more remains were recovered bringing the toll to 44, while 13 were still missing and 60 were rescued. An additional find, coupled with two deaths in hospital, brought the toll to 47 as of 19 April. One of those still missing after 48 hours was an aid worker with the group Médecins Sans Frontières.

== Response ==
The airport had no functioning firefighting equipment. The initial crash response involved several international agencies present in Goma, including several organisations of the United Nations (MONUC, Office for the Coordination of Humanitarian Affairs, UNICEF, World Health Organization) and also Médecins Sans Frontières France and the International Red Cross. Members of the 6th Battalion of the Sikh Light Infantry, Indian Army, who were posted there as part of the North Kivu Brigade of the UN Mission in Congo (MONUC), swung into action to effect a rescue of 6 survivors and retrieve 18 bodies. Indian Army personnel were also involved in initial crowd control and preventing the fire that arose from spreading to thickly populated areas nearby. Both flight recorders were recovered.

One Kinshasa paper, Le phare, reports that airports throughout the country are still using fifty-year-old infrastructure from the Belgian colonial era.

Two days after the crash, the DRC government committed to making the runway repairs neglected since January 2002. A local human rights organization laid the blame on the DRC government:

La responsabilité du crash d'un DC 9 de la compagnie Hewa Bora Airways le 15 avril dernier à Goma est d'abord imputable au gouvernement congolais, selon le Renadhoc, Réseau national des organisations non-gouvernementales de droits de l'homme en RDC.
(The responsibility for the crash of a Hewa Bora Airways DC 9 on 15 April in Goma, lies completely irrefutably with the Congolese government, according to Renadhoc, the National Network of Non-Governmental Human Rights Organisations in the DRC.)
-Radio Okapi 2008-04-21

The German government sponsored a €15 million, three-year project to rehabilitate the 1,100-metre (3,600 ft) of buried runway following the Hewa Bora crash, but that work had been suspended when another aircraft, operated by CAA (Compagnie Africaine d'Aviation) overran onto the lava in November 2009.

The World Bank released US$52 million in 2015 to complete the work.

== Investigation ==
In their 2011 report to Congress, the NTSB classified this accident as a major ongoing investigation in which they were assisting the Democratic Republic of the Congo.
