= Matari Airport =

Matari Airport Aéroport de Matari
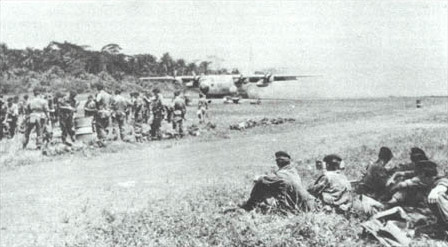
- Matari Airport (then Paulis Airport) during Operation Dragon Noir, 1964
- IATA: IRP; ICAO: FZJH

Summary
- Airport type: Civil
- Operator: Government
- Serves: Isiro
- Location: Democratic Republic of the Congo
- Elevation AMSL: 2,438 ft (743 m)
- Coordinates: 2°49′40″N 27°35′15″E

Map
- Location of Matari Airport in DRC

Runways
Direction	Length		Surface
Direction	m	ft	Surface
13/31	2,500	8,202	Asphalt
- Source: GCM WAD Google Maps

Matari Airport (IATA: IRP, ICAO: FZJH) (French: Aéroport de Matari) is an airport serving Isiro, a city in Haut-Uélé Province, Democratic Republic of the Congo. The airport is 6 kilometres (3.7 mi) northwest of the city.

The Isiro-Matari VOR/DME (Ident: IRO) is located 1.1 nautical miles (2.0 km) southeast of the airport.

== Airlines and destinations ==
Airlines	Destinations
Compagnie Africaine d'Aviation	Beni, Bukavu, Bunia, Goma, Kalemie, Kisangani, Lubumbashi

== Accidents and incidents ==
On 5 September 2005, a Kavatshi Airlines Antonov An-26B struck a tree and crashed 1.5 kilometres (1 mi) from Runway 31 at Matari Airport while on final approach in fog, killing all 11 people on board.

== See also ==
- Transport in the Democratic Republic of the Congo
- List of airports in the Democratic Republic of the Congo
