= Congo Airways =

State-owned flag carrier of DR Congo

IATA	ICAO	Call sign
8Z	COG	CONGO AIR
- Founded: 15 August 2014
- Commenced operations: 20 October 2015
- Operating bases: N'djili Airport
- Fleet size: 3
- Destinations: 3
- Headquarters: Kinshasa, Democratic Republic of the Congo
- Key people: Louise Mayuma Kasende (chairperson); José Dubier Lueya (CEO)
- Website: congoairways.com

Congo Airways S.A. is the state-owned flag carrier airline of the Democratic Republic of the Congo (DRC). With a paid-up capital of US$90 million, it started operations on 20 October 2015. As of June 2026, Congo Airways, as all other airlines with an AOC issued in the DRC, is banned from flying into the EU.

== History ==
Congo Airways was created on 15 August 2014 at the government's instigation, and made its first flight on 20 October 2015 using two Airbus A320 aircraft acquired from Alitalia. The company initially served Congolese destinations from its base at N'djili Airport in Kinshasa, and planned to increase its fleet and serve regional and international markets. Air France Consulting provided technical assistance to the airline. One of the airline's aircraft was impounded in Dublin for a few weeks in September 2015 where it was to be painted.

On 10 December 2019, Congo Airways signed a $194.4 million deal to acquire two E175 jets from Embraer. The jets were expected to be delivered in Q4 2020. On 26 May 2020, Congo Airways have converted the firm order made in December 2019 for two E175 aircraft, with purchase rights for two more, into a firm order for two E190-E2 jets, with purchase rights for a further two. The jets are expected to be delivered in Q2 2022. In September 2021, the airline also executed a wet lease of two Embraer 190 aircraft for two years from Kenya Airways.

In July 2022, Embraer canceled the orders for E2 jets from Congo Airways.

Congo Airways had no active aircraft in July of 2024 and made a recovery plan in November of 2024. The fleet renewal included 3 A320s models also in consideration included the A330 and E 190. Congo Airways has a plan to relaunch in the first quarter of 2026.

In 2025, there was chronic mismanagement exposed of the status of the airline and no aircraft have been delivered to Congo Airways. The airline missed its March 2026 deadline for launch. This was after the CNSS could not secure the lease which led the money not to be delivered to Congo Airways.

== Corporate affairs ==
=== Ownership ===
The airline is 100% state-controlled, being owned by the Government of the DRC. Shareholders are reported to be various government agencies: the Intermodal Freight Management Office (OGEFREM), the National Social Security Institute (INSS), the General of Quarries and Mines (Gécamines), the Congolese Transport and Ports Society (SCTP), the Industry Promotion Fund (FPI) and the Airway Authority (RVA).

=== Business trends ===
Congo Airways does not appear to have published its accounts; also, in an audit dated 28 May 2021 there were detailed allegations that embezzlement and over-invoicing totalling several million dollars had taken place at Congo Airways over recent years. Available figures (largely from AFRAA reports, which contain inconsistencies) are shown below (for years ending 31 December):

	2016	2017	2018	2019	2020
Turnover (US$m)	40				
Net profit					
Number of employees (at year end)	365	326	430		
Number of passengers (000s)	210	358	359		
Passenger load factor (%)		71	62		
Number of aircraft (at year end)	4	6	4	4	4
Notes/sources					

== Destinations ==
As of September 2023, the company served the Lubumbashi–Kinshasa sector prior to suspending operations. In May 2018, the airline commenced flights to Douala and Johannesburg-OR Tambo Airport.

Country	City	Airport	Notes	Refs
Cameroon	Douala	Douala International Airport	Terminated	
Democratic Republic of Congo	Gemena	Gemena Airport	Terminated	
Democratic Republic of Congo	Goma	Goma International Airport		
Democratic Republic of Congo	Kananga	Kananga Airport	Terminated	
Democratic Republic of Congo	Kindu	Kindu Airport	Terminated	
Democratic Republic of Congo	Kinshasa	N'djili International Airport	Hub	
Democratic Republic of Congo	Kisangani	Kisangani Bangoka International Airport	Terminated	
Democratic Republic of Congo	Lubumbashi	Lubumbashi International Airport		
Democratic Republic of Congo	Mbandaka	Mbandaka Airport	Terminated	
Democratic Republic of Congo	Mbuji-Mayi	Mbuji-Mayi Airport	Terminated	
Democratic Republic of Congo	Moanda	Muanda Airport	Terminated	
South Africa	Johannesburg	O. R. Tambo International Airport	Terminated	

=== Codeshare agreements ===
- Kenya Airways

== Fleet ==
=== Current fleet ===
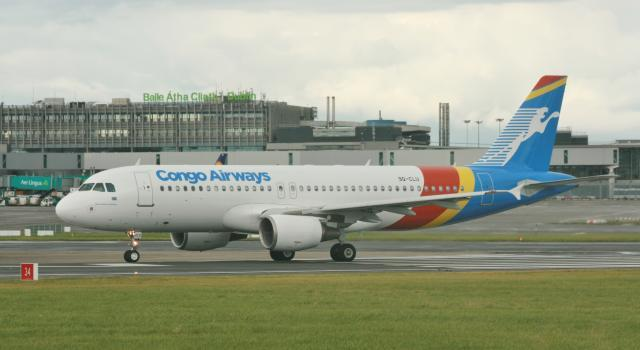
Congo Airways Airbus A320-200

As of July 2026, Congo Airways operates the following aircraft:

Congo Airways fleet
Aircraft	In service	Orders	Passengers			Notes
Aircraft	In service	Orders	C	Y	Total	Notes
Airbus A320	1	—	10	150	160	
De Havilland Canada DHC-8-Q400	1	—	5	64	69	
Embraer 190	1	—				
Total	3					

=== Former fleet ===
As of August 2025, Congo Airways operated 2 Airbus A320 and 2 De Havilland Canada DHC-8-400.

== See also ==
- Air Congo
- Transport in the Democratic Republic of the Congo
