= Muanda Airport =

Muanda Airport Aéroport de Muanda
- IATA: MNB; ICAO: FZAG

Summary
- Airport type: Public
- Operator: Government
- Serves: Muanda (Moanda), Democratic Republic of the Congo
- Elevation AMSL: 89 ft (27 m)
- Coordinates: 5°55′51″S 12°21′06″E

Map
- Location within DRC

Runways
Direction	Length		Surface
Direction	m	ft	Surface
04/22	1,483	4,865	Asphalt
- Sources: WAD GCM Google Maps

Muanda Airport or Moanda Airport (IATA: MNB, ICAO: FZAG) is an airport serving Muanda (also spelled Moanda), an Atlantic coastal city in the Democratic Republic of the Congo.

== Facilities ==
The airport operates at an elevation of 89 feet (27 m) above mean sea level. It has one runway designated 04/22 with an asphalt surface measuring 1,483 by 30 metres (4,865 ft × 98 ft).

The runway is within the city and begins 600 metres (2,000 ft) inland from the coast. Southwest approach and departure are over the water.

The Kitona Base VOR (Ident: KIT) is located 4.0 nautical miles (7.4 km) east of the airport.

== Airlines and destinations ==
Airlines	Destinations
Congo Airways	Kinshasa–N'Djili
Air Congo	Kinshasa–N'Djili

== See also ==
- Transport in the Democratic Republic of the Congo
- List of airports in the Democratic Republic of the Congo
