= Mbandaka Airport =

- IATA: MDK; ICAO: FZEA

Summary
- Airport type: Public
- Operator: Government
- Location: Mbandaka, Democratic Republic of the Congo
- Elevation AMSL: 1,040 ft (320 m)
- Coordinates: 00°01′21″N 018°17′19″E

Map
- Location in the Democratic Republic of the Congo

Runways
Direction	Length		Surface
Direction	m	ft	Surface
18/36	2,202	7,224	Asphalt
- Source: DAFIF GCM Google Maps

Mbandaka Airport (French: Aéroport de Mbandaka) (IATA: MDK, ICAO: FZEA) is an airport serving the Congo River port of Mbandaka, capital city of the Équateur District in the Democratic Republic of the Congo. The runway is on the southeast side of the city.

== Facilities ==
The airport is at an elevation of 317 metres (1,040 ft) above mean sea level. It has one runway designated 18/36 with an asphalt surface measuring 2,202 by 45 metres (7,224 ft × 148 ft).

The Mbandaka VOR/DME (Ident: MBA) is located 1.1 kilometres (0.6 nmi) off the approach threshold of Runway 18.

== Airlines and destinations ==
Airlines	Destinations
Air Congo	Gemena, Kinshasa–N'djili
Air Kasaï	Gemena, Kinshasa–N'djili
Compagnie Africaine d'Aviation	Boende, Kinshasa–N'djili
Congo Airways	Kinshasa–N'djili

== See also ==
- Transport in the Democratic Republic of the Congo
- List of airports in the Democratic Republic of the Congo
