= Kindu Airport =

Domestic airport in Kindu, DR Congo

Kindu Airport Aéroport de Kindu
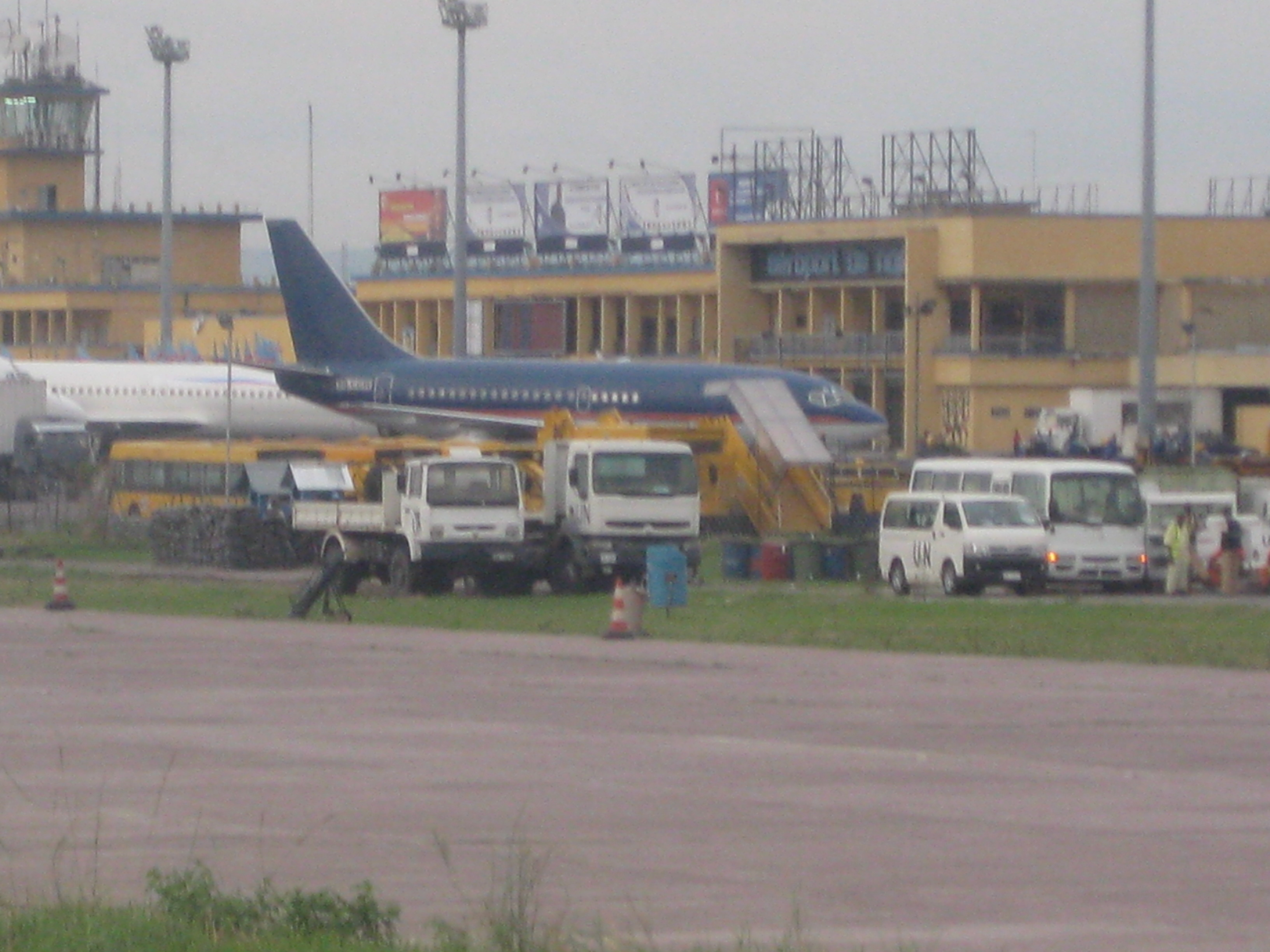
- IATA: KND; ICAO: FZOA

Summary
- Airport type: Public
- Operator: Government
- Serves: Kindu, Democratic Republic of the Congo
- Elevation AMSL: 1,628 ft (496 m)
- Coordinates: 02°55′09″S 025°54′55″E

Map
- Location in the Democratic Republic of the Congo

Runways
Direction	Length		Surface
Direction	m	ft	Surface
18/36	2,195	7,201	Asphalt
- Source: GCM Google Maps

Kindu Airport (IATA: KND, ICAO: FZOA) is an airport serving the Lualaba River port of Kindu, Democratic Republic of the Congo.

The Kindu VOR/DME (Ident: KIN) is located 0.9 nautical miles (1.7 km) west of the airport.

== Airlines and destinations ==
Airlines	Destinations
Air Congo	Kinshasa–N'djili, Kisangani
Compagnie Africaine d'Aviation	Goma, Kinshasa–N'djili, Kisangani
Congo Airways	Goma, Kinshasa–N'djili, Kisangani

== See also ==
- Transport in the Democratic Republic of the Congo
- List of airports in the Democratic Republic of the Congo
- Kindu atrocity
