= Air Kasaï =

Airline of the Democratic Republic of the Congo

IATA	ICAO	Call sign
-	-	-
- Founded: 1983
- Hubs: N'Dolo Airport
- Secondary hubs: Mbandaka, Tshikapa, Kananga
- Fleet size: 4
- Destinations: 21
- Headquarters: N'Dolo Airport; Kinshasa, Democratic Republic of Congo
- Website: www.airkasai.cd

Previous logo

Air Kasaï is an airline with its head office on the property of N'Dolo Airport in Barumbu, Kinshasa, Democratic Republic of Congo. It operates charter services within Africa. Its main base is N'Dolo Airport, Kinshasa.

The airline is banned from operating in the European Union.

== History ==
The airline was established in 1983, and was formerly known as Transport Aérien Congo (TAC) and Transport Aérien Zaïrois (TAZ). It is a Swedish owned company.

In March 2006, Air Kasaï was officially banned from operating in the whole EU, plus Norway and Switzerland.

== Destinations ==
Air Kasaï serves the following destinations (as of April 2012):

City	Country	Region	Airport
Beni	Democratic Republic of the Congo	Central Africa	Wageni Airport
Bunia	Democratic Republic of Congo	Central Africa	Bunia Airport
Entebbe	Uganda	East Africa	Entebbe International Airport
Goma	Democratic Republic of Congo	Central Africa	Goma International Airport
Kinshasa	Democratic Republic of Congo	Central Africa	N'djili Airport ^{[Base]}
Kinshasa	Democratic Republic of Congo	Central Africa	N'Dolo Airport ^{[Base]}
Libreville	Gabon	Central Africa	Libreville Leon M'ba International Airport
Lubumbashi	Democratic Republic of Congo	Central Africa	Lubumbashi International Airport
Pointe-Noire	Republic of Congo	Central Africa	Antonio Agostinho Neto International Airport

== Fleet ==
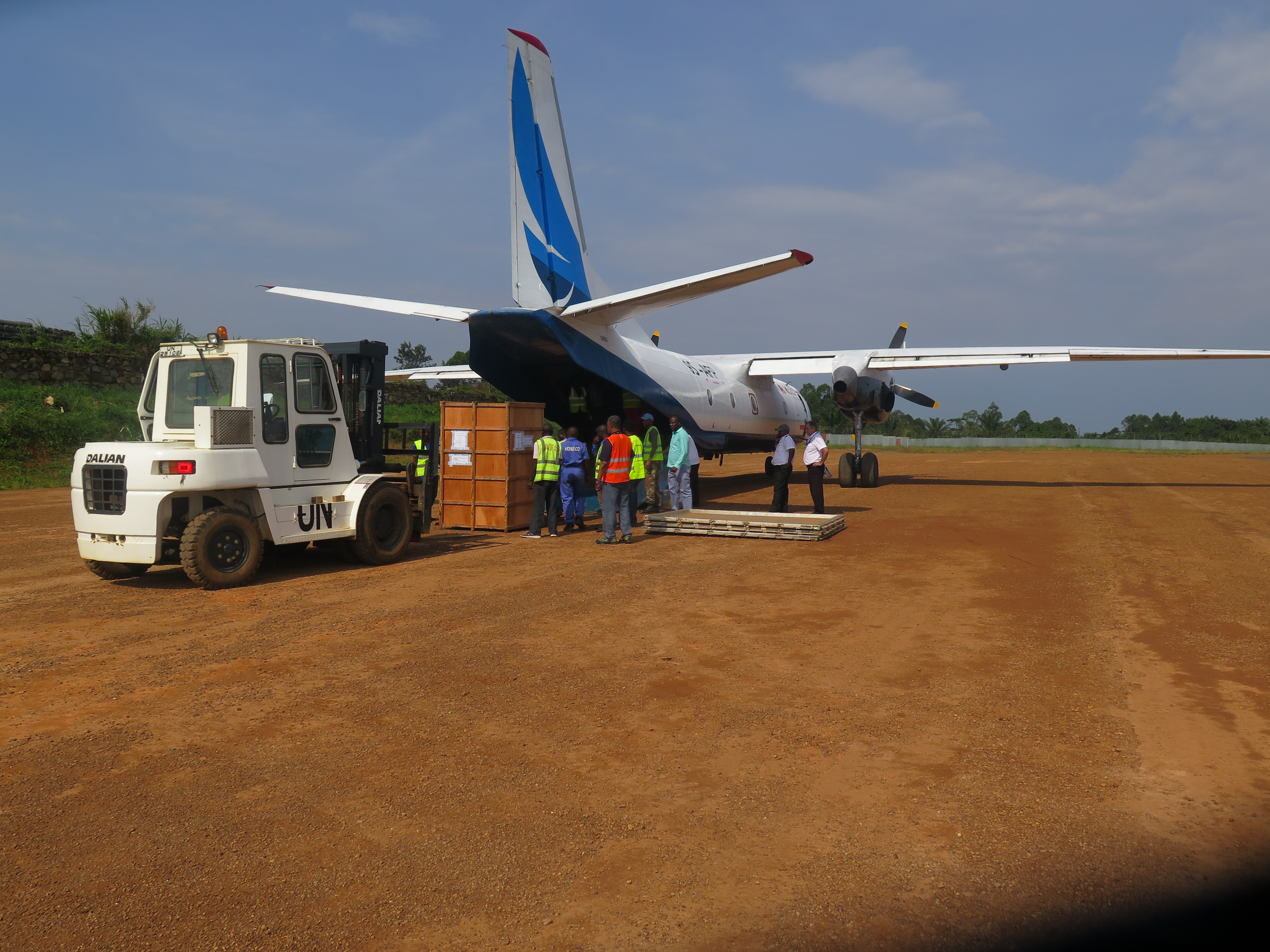
The An-26 of Air Kasaï delivering medical logistics at Beni Airport, 2018

As of July 2026, Air Kasaï operates 1 Fokker 50.

The Air Kasaï fleet consists of the following aircraft (as of January 2025):

Air Kasaï fleet
Aircraft	In fleet
ATR 72	1
Let L-410 Turbolet	1
Boeing 737-230	1
Antonov An-2	1
Total	4

== Media ==
In March 2014, Air Kasaï was featured in the Vice News episode "Russian Pilots of Congo".

== Incidents and accidents ==
- On 9 September 2005, an Air Kasaï Antonov An-26B crashed in the Republic of the Congo 50 kilometers (31 miles) north of Brazzaville, killing all 13 people (four crew members and nine passengers) on board.
- On 27 July 2018, an Antonov An-2 crashed on take-off from an airstrip near Kamako, killing five of seven occupants.
- On 21 January 2025, an Antonov An-26 crashed after it overran the runway after an in-flight fire at Kongolo Airport. The aircraft sustained substantial damage but no casualties were reported.

== See also ==
- Transport in the Democratic Republic of the Congo
