= Kananga Airport =

Kananga Airport Aéroport de Kananga
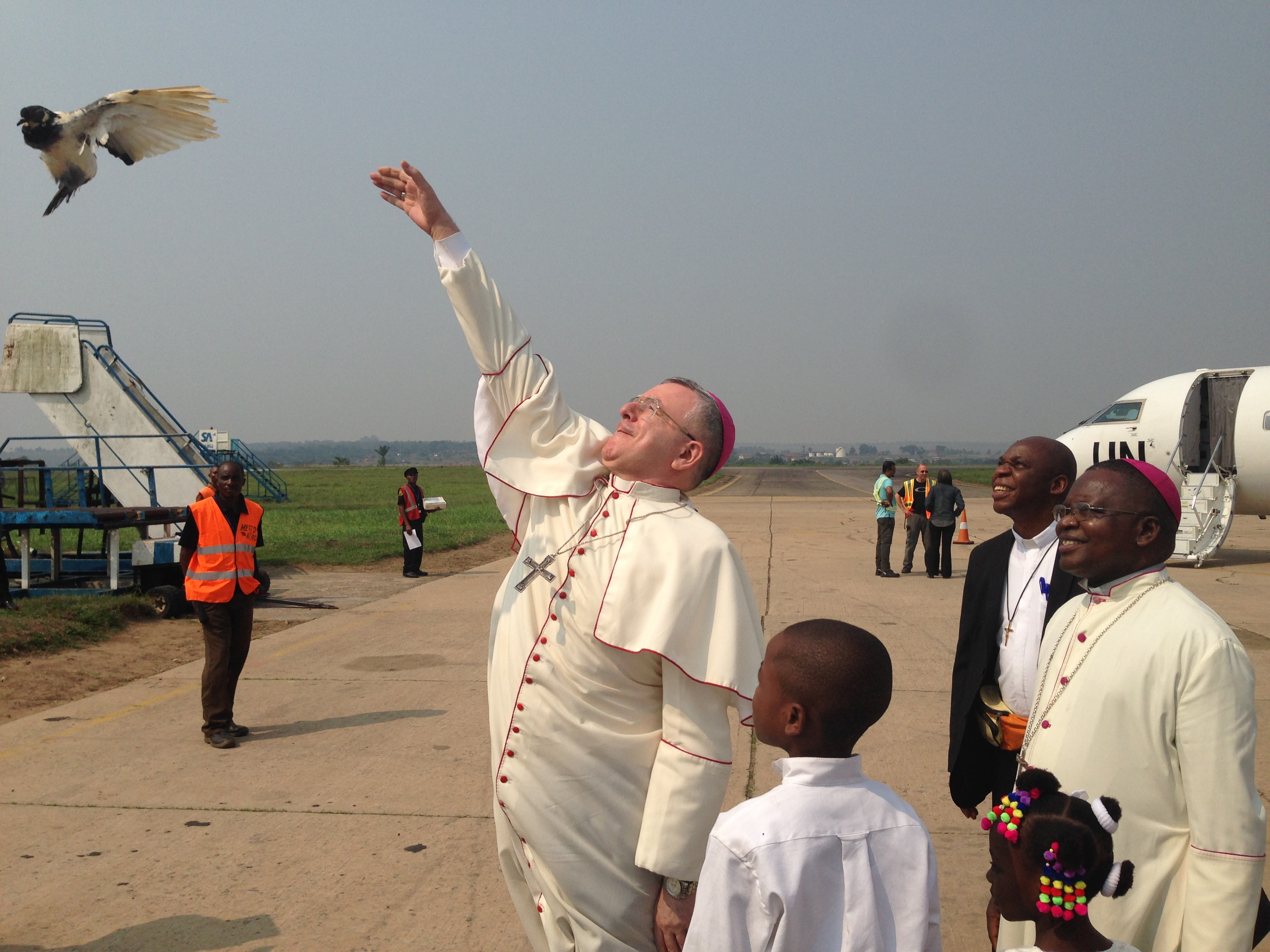
- Luis Mariano Montemayor and other bishops at Kananga Airport
- IATA: KGA; ICAO: FZUA

Summary
- Airport type: Public
- Operator: Government
- Serves: Kananga, Democratic Republic of the Congo
- Elevation AMSL: 2,142 ft (653 m)
- Coordinates: 05°54′00″S 022°28′09″E

Map
- Location in the Democratic Republic of the Congo

Runways
Direction	Length		Surface
Direction	m	ft	Surface
11/29	2,200	7,218	Asphalt
- Google Maps GCM

Kananga Airport (IATA: KGA, ICAO: FZUA) is an airport serving Kananga, Democratic Republic of the Congo.

== Airlines and destinations ==
Airlines	Destinations
Air Congo	Kinshasa–N'djili
Air Kasaï	Kinshasa–N'djili, Mbuji-Mayi
Congo Airways	Kinshasa–N'djili, Lubumbashi

== See also ==
- Transport in the Democratic Republic of the Congo
- List of airports in the Democratic Republic of the Congo
