= MetroKin =

Proposed urban rail network in Kinshasa, DRC

The Kinshasa Urban Train (MetroKin) is a proposed urban rail network which would serve the Kinshasa metropolitan area. In February 2023, the Africa Finance Corporation (AFC) signed a joint development agreement with Trans Connexion Congo (TCC) to jointly develop the rail network. On 30 May 2024, AFC signed a memorandum of understanding with Alstom. Under current plans, MetroKin would be built in four phases, with the first 25 km phase running from Kinshasa central station to N’Djili International Airport. In addition, the plan for the first phase includes rebuilding the existing 1067-mm gauge route as a double-track 1435mm-gauge line and building eight new train stations.
