= Gemena Airport =

Gemena Airport Aéroport de Gemena
- IATA: GMA; ICAO: FZFK

Summary
- Airport type: Public
- Operator: Government
- Location: Gemena, Democratic Republic of the Congo
- Elevation AMSL: 1,378 ft (420 m)
- Coordinates: 3°14′07″N 19°46′15″E

Map
- Location in the Democratic Republic of the Congo

Runways
Direction	Length		Surface
Direction	m	ft	Surface
11/29	1,995	6,545	Asphalt
- Source: WAD GCM Google Maps

Gemena Airport (French: Aéroport de Gemena, IATA: GMA, ICAO: FZFK) is an airport serving Gemena, the capital of the Sud-Ubangi District in Sud-Ubangi province in the Democratic Republic of the Congo.

The Gemena non-directional beacon (Ident: GEM) is located on the field.

== Airlines and destinations ==
Airlines	Destinations
Air Congo	Kinshasa–N'djili, Mbandaka
Air Kasaï	Kinshasa–N'djili, Mbandaka
Compagnie Africaine d'Aviation	Lisala

== See also ==
- Transport in Democratic Republic of the Congo
- List of airports in Democratic Republic of the Congo
