= Galaxie Corporation =

Cargo airline of the Democratic Republic of the Congo

IATA	ICAO	Call sign
-	-	-
- Founded: 2003
- Ceased operations: 2010

Galaxie Corporation was a private cargo airline in the Democratic Republic of Congo (DRC), operating as Kavatshi Airlines.

The airline is on the List of air carriers banned in the European Union.

== Incidents and accidents ==
- On 5 September 2005, an Antonov An-26B arriving from Beni and approaching Runway 31 in fog struck a tree, crashed 1.5 kilometers (0.9 mile) short of the runway, and burned at Isiro's Matari Airport in the Democratic Republic of the Congo, killing all 11 people (four crew members and seven passengers) on board. The aircraft, bearing (Moldova registration ER-AZT), was wet leased from Aerocom in November 2003. It had continued operating after its certificate of airworthiness expired in September 2004

The airlines ceased operations in 2010.

== See also ==
- Transport in the Democratic Republic of the Congo
