= United Nations Joint Logistics Centre =

The United Nations Joint Logistics Centre (UNJLC) was created to optimise and complement the logistics capabilities of cooperating agencies within a well-defined crisis area for the benefit of the ongoing humanitarian operation. In 2005 the UNJLC was merged with the World Food Programme Logistics Coordination Unit as part of the Logistics Cluster and all UNJLC offices were disbanded in 2008.

The UNJLC provides logistics support at operational planning, coordination and monitoring level. Unless specified otherwise, UN Agencies and other humanitarian bodies, which are established in the area, will continue to exercise their normal responsibilities. As a result, the UNJLC will not be involved in policy and establishment of humanitarian needs and priorities.

== Functions ==
- Collecting, analyzing and disseminating logistics information relevant to the ongoing humanitarian operation,
- Scheduling the movement of humanitarian cargo and relief workers within the crisis area, using commonly available transport assets,
- Managing the import, receipt, dispatch and tracking of non-assigned food and non-food relief commodities;
- Upon specific request, make detailed assessments of roads, bridges, airports, ports and other logistics infrastructure and recommend actions for repair and reconstruction

The scope of the UNJLC activities may vary with the type of emergency, the scale of involvement of the cooperating partners and the humanitarian needs. In general terms, the UNJLC would:

- Serve as an information platform for supporting humanitarian logistics operations;
- Upon specific request, coordinate the use of available warehouse capacity;
- Coordinate the influx of strategic humanitarian airlift into the crisis area;
- Serve as an information platform for recommending the most efficient modes of transportation;
- Identify logistical bottlenecks and propose satisfactory solutions or alternatives;
- Serve as the focal point for co-ordinating facilitation measures with local authorities for importing, transporting and distributing relief commodities into the country;
- Provide reliable information regarding the logistics capacity in meeting the prioritization of targets;
- Be the focal point to coordinate humanitarian logistics operations with the Local Emergency Management Authorities (LEMA) or, in a Peacekeeping or Complex Environment, with the Department of Peace Keeping Operations (DPKO) or the relevant military entities.
