= Kalemie Airport =

Kalemie Airport Aéroport de Kalémie
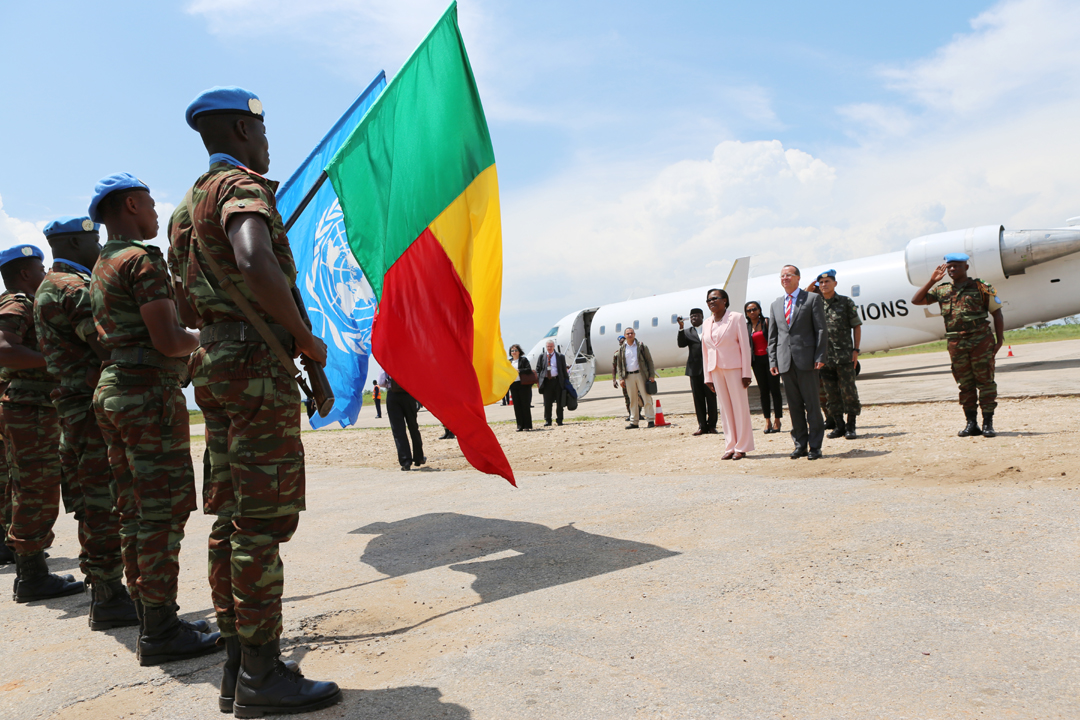
- IATA: FMI; ICAO: FZRF

Summary
- Airport type: Public
- Location: Kalemie, Tanganyika Province
- Elevation AMSL: 2,569 ft / 783 m
- Coordinates: 05°52′30″S 29°15′00″E

Map
- Location of Airport in Democratic Republic of the Congo

Runways
Direction	Length		Surface
Direction	m	ft	Surface
06/24	1,750	5,741	Asphalt
- Sources: GCM

Kalemie Airport (IATA: FMI, ICAO: FZRF) (French: Aéroport de Kalémie) is an airport serving Kalemie in Tanganyika Province (formerly Katanga Province) and on Lake Tanganyika, in the southeastern Democratic Republic of the Congo.

== Airlines and destinations ==
Airlines	Destinations
Air Congo	Kinshasa–N'djili
Compagnie Africaine d'Aviation	Beni, Bunia, Goma, Kinshasa–N'djili, Kongolo, Lubumbashi, Mbuji-Mayi

== See also ==
- Transport in the Democratic Republic of the Congo
- List of airports in the Democratic Republic of the Congo
