= Beni Airport =

Beni Airport Aéroport de Beni Mavivi Beni Mavivi Airport
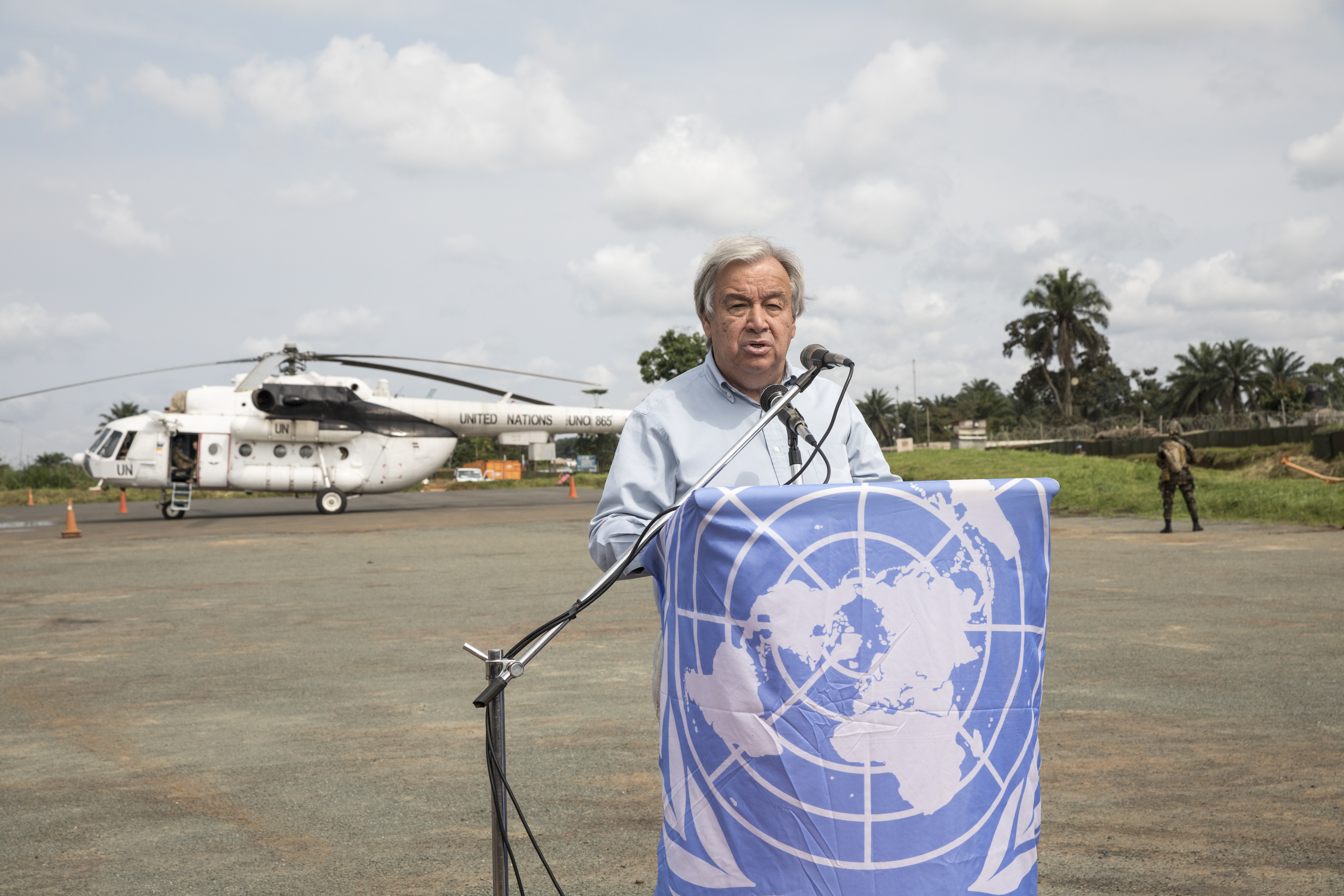
- António Guterres at Beni Mavivi Airport, 2019
- IATA: BNC; ICAO: FZNP

Summary
- Serves: Beni, Democratic Republic of the Congo
- Elevation AMSL: 3,517 ft / 1,072 m
- Coordinates: 0°34′30″N 29°28′26″E

Map
- Location of airport in the Democratic Republic of the Congo

Runways
| Direction | Length | | Surface |
| Direction | m | ft | Surface |
|---|---|---|---|
| 11/29 | 2,000 | 6,562 | Asphalt/gravel |
- Source: GCM SkyVector

Beni-Mavivi Airport (IATA: BNC, ICAO: FZNP) (French: Aéroport de Béni) is an airport serving the city of Beni in Nord-Kivu Province, Democratic Republic of the Congo. The airport is 8 kilometres (5.0 mi) north of Beni, by the town of Mavivi.

Beni-Mavivi Airport has a 3.6 km runway (3,600 meters), 45 m wide and 800 m visibility for aircraft, making it the longest in the eastern Democratic Republic of Congo and one of the most important nationwide.

It obtained its international status after Goma International Airport became difficult to access due to insecurity.

This airport is a major strategic asset for opening up and promoting the economic development of Beni and Butembo, two large cities where numerous Nande (Yira) entrepreneurs conduct extensive trade between Asia and the DRC.

The Wageni Airport, which is within the city of Beni, is also sometimes called Beni Airport.

== Airlines and destinations ==
| Airlines | Destinations |
|---|---|
| Compagnie Africaine d'Aviation | Bukavu, Bunia, Goma, Isiro, Kalemie, Kisangani, Lubumbashi |

== See also ==
- Transport in the Democratic Republic of the Congo
- List of airports in the Democratic Republic of the Congo
