= Bunia Airport =

Bunia Airport Aéroport de Bunia
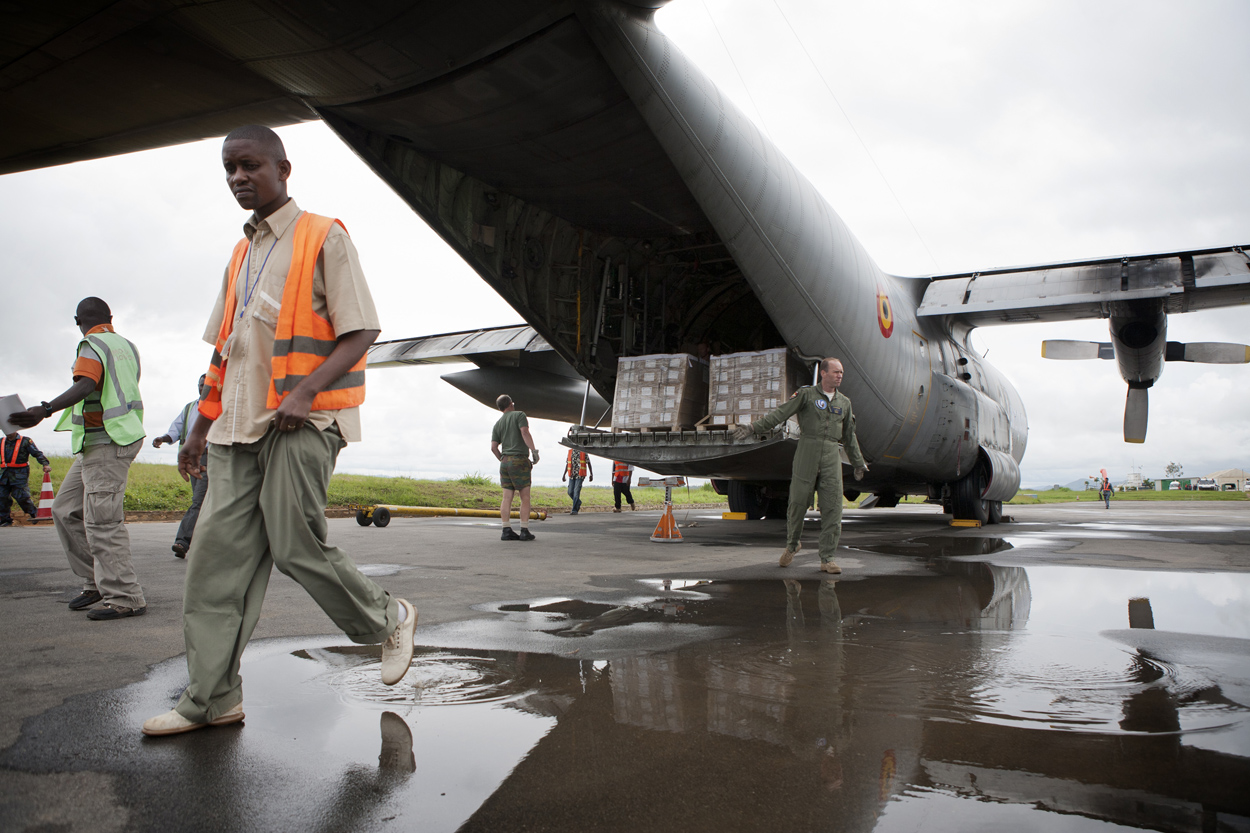
- Unloading a Hercules aircraft in 2011
- IATA: BUX; ICAO: FZKA

Summary
- Airport type: Public
- Location: Bunia, DR Congo
- Elevation AMSL: 4,045 ft (1,233 m)
- Coordinates: 1°33′57″N 30°13′15″E

Map
- Location of Bunia Airport in DRC

Runways
Direction	Length		Surface
Direction	m	ft	Surface
10/28	1,850	6,070	Asphalt
- Source: GCM Google Maps

Bunia Airport (IATA: BUX, ICAO: FZKA) (French: Aéroport de Bunia) is an airport serving Bunia the capital of Ituri province, Democratic Republic of the Congo.

The Bunia VOR/DME (Ident: BUN) and Bunia non-directional beacon (Ident: BUN) are located on the field.

The airport was temporarily shut down in May 2026 due to the 2026 Ebola epidemic. After re-opening, commercial flights were again suspended in June 2026.

== Airlines and destinations ==
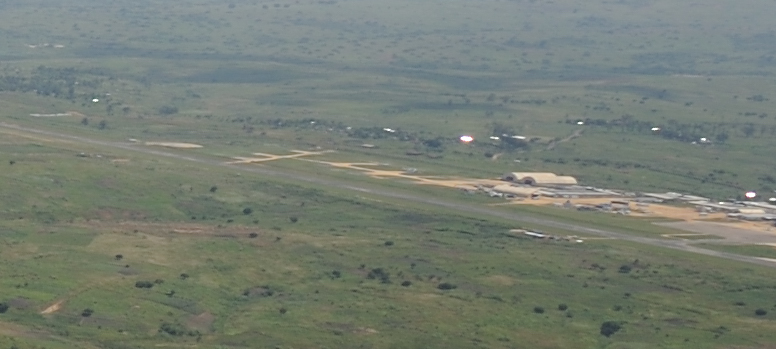
Aerial photograph of the airport, 2008.

Airlines	Destinations
Compagnie Africaine d'Aviation	Beni, Bukavu, Goma, Isiro, Kalemie, Kisangani, Lubumbashi

== See also ==
- Transport in the Democratic Republic of the Congo
- List of airports in the Democratic Republic of the Congo
