= Gomair =

Congolese based charter airline

| IATA | ICAO | Call sign |
|---|---|---|
| - | - | - |
- Founded: 1996
- Hubs: Goma
- Fleet size: Disputed
- Key people: Gato Paul

Gomair is a Congolese based charter airline based in Goma Airport, Democratic Republic of the Congo. It operates aircraft such as the ATR 72, and Boeing 737. It was founded in 1996 to operate passengers and cargo charters in what was then Zaire. In 1997 Zaire became the DRC. It even serves destinations Kigali and Entebbe, also serving Kampala. Owned by Gato Paul, it is active and focuses on Passenger charters. It is banned from the EU like all other Congolese based airlines. On January 20, 2023, Gomair added its first ATR 72 freighter. On the fourth of February 2025 an ATR 72 of Gomair was seized by rebels.

== Fleet ==
As of July 2026, Gomair operates the following aircraft:

| Aircraft | In service | Orders | Passengers |
|---|---|---|---|
| ATR 72-500F | 1 | — | |
| Boeing 737-300QC | 2 | — | |
| Fokker 50 | 2 | — | |
| Total | 5 | — | |

Other aircraft:

- ATR 72 (one seized by rebels)
- Fokker 50

== Accidents and incidents ==
On December 20, 2018, a Gomair AN 26 crashed on landing after delivering election equipment. After a few hours the wreckage was found and all 7 occupants were dead.

On June 16, 2022, a 737-300 had a left gear collapse.
