= Wageni Airport =

Wageni Airport Beni Airport
- IATA: none; ICAO: FZNS; LID: CD-0001

Summary
- Serves: Beni, Democratic Republic of the Congo
- Elevation AMSL: 3,786 ft / 1,154 m
- Coordinates: 0°30′30″N 29°28′30″E

Map
- Location of airport in the Democratic Republic of the Congo

Runways
Direction	Length		Surface
Direction	m	ft	Surface
02/20	1,730	5,676	Gravel
- Source: GCM Google Maps

Wageni Airport (ICAO: FZNS) is an airport serving the city of Beni, in the North Kivu Province of the Democratic Republic of the Congo. The airport is in the northeast section of the city.

== See also ==
- Transport in Democratic Republic of the Congo
- List of airports in Democratic Republic of the Congo
- Beni Airport
