= Mbuji Mayi Airport =

Mbuji Mayi Airport Aéroport de Mbuji Mayi
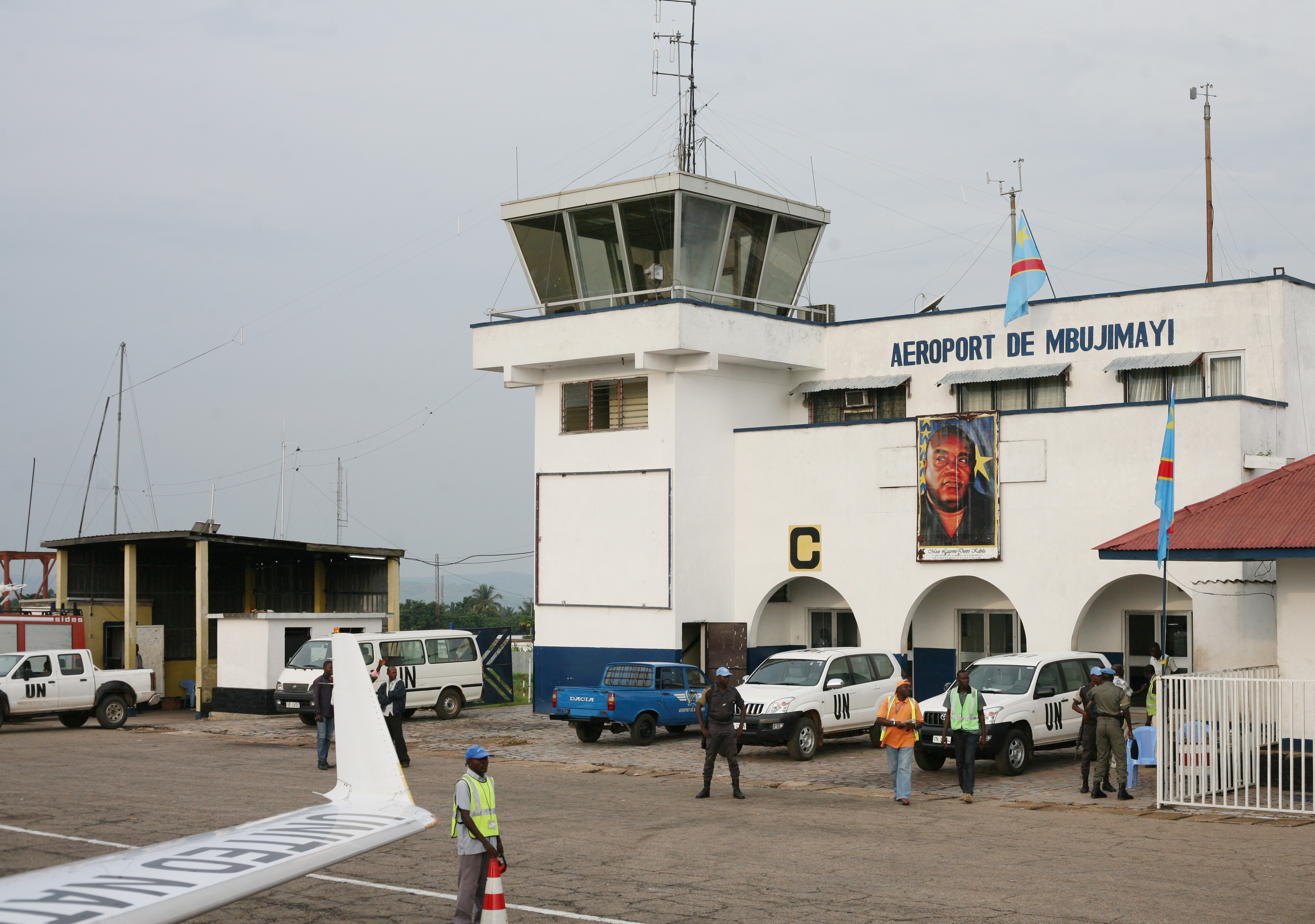
- IATA: MJM; ICAO: FZWA

Summary
- Airport type: Public
- Operator: Government
- Serves: Mbuji Mayi
- Location: Bipemba, Mbuji Mayi, Kasai-Oriental, Democratic Republic of the Congo
- Elevation AMSL: 2,221 ft (677 m)
- Coordinates: 06°07′16″S 023°34′08″E

Map
- Location in the Democratic Republic of the Congo

Runways
Direction	Length		Surface
Direction	m	ft	Surface
16/34	2,320	7,612	Asphalt
- Source: DAFIF GCM SkyVector

Mbuji-Mayi Airport (French: Aéroport international de Mbuji-Mayi Bipemba) (IATA: MJM, ICAO: FZWA) is an airport serving Mbuji Mayi (formerly Bakwanga), the capital of the Kasai-Oriental Province in the Democratic Republic of the Congo.

== Facilities ==
The airport resides at an elevation of 677 metres (2,221 ft) above mean sea level. It has one runway designated 16/34 with an asphalt surface measuring 2,320 by 45 metres (7,612 ft × 148 ft) with medium low quality pavement. It was extended by 320 metres (1,050 ft) from 2,000 metres (6,600 ft) in February 2026, funded by the African Development Bank.

The Mbuji Mayi non-directional beacon (Ident: MN) is located 1 nautical mile (1.9 km) north-northwest of the airport. The Mbuji Mayi VOR/DME (Ident: MBY) is located on the field.

== Airlines and destinations ==
Airlines	Destinations
Air Congo	Kananga, Kinshasa–N'djili
Air Kasaï	Kananga, Kinshasa–N'djili
Compagnie Africaine d'Aviation	Kolwezi
Congo Airways	Kinshasa–N'djili, Lubumbashi
Ethiopian Airlines	Addis Ababa, Lubumbashi

== Accidents and incidents ==
- On August 19, 2015, a Brussels Airlines Boeing 737, operating for Korongo Airlines, sustained damage to its horizontal stabilizer upon landing at Mbuji Mayi Airport due to bad pavement conditions
- On December 24, 2015, a Services Air Cargo Airbus A310 was unable to stop on the runway due to poor pavement conditions and wet runway surface, and exited the runway. A total of 8 people were killed and 9 injured, all on the ground.

== See also ==
- Transport in the Democratic Republic of the Congo
- List of airports in the Democratic Republic of the Congo
