= Goma International Airport =

Goma Airport Aéroport international de Goma
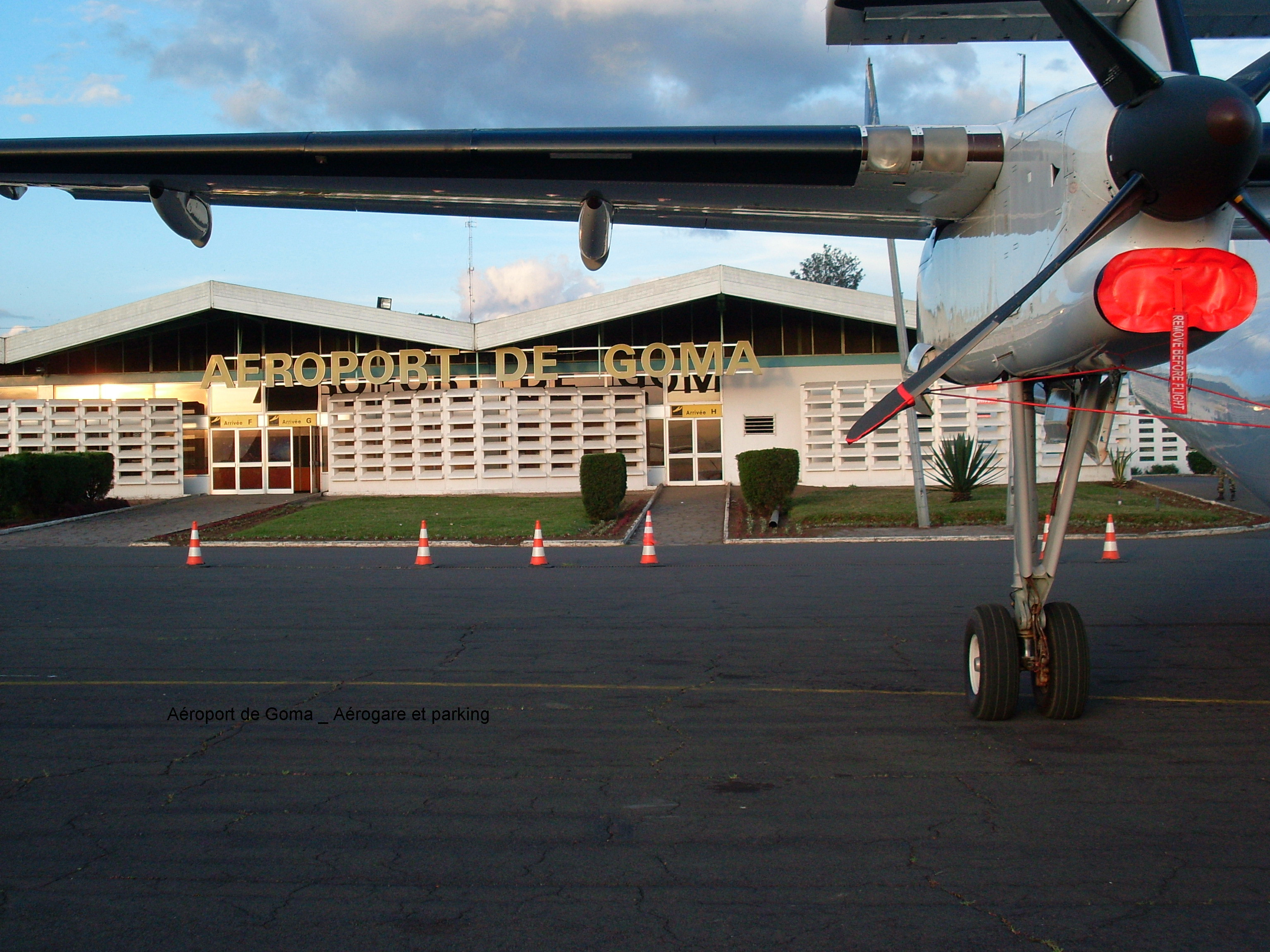
- Mount Nyiragongo in the background
- IATA: GOM; ICAO: FZNA

Summary
- Airport type: Public
- Operator: M23 Movement
- Location: Karisimbi, Goma, Democratic Republic of the Congo
- Opened: 1978; 48 years ago
- Focus city for: Goma
- Elevation AMSL: 5,046 ft (1,538 m)
- Coordinates: 01°40′15.08″S 29°14′18.25″E

Map
- Location of Goma International Airport in DRC

Runways
Direction	Length		Surface
Direction	m	ft	Surface
17/35	3,000	9,843	Asphalt
- Source: Régie des Voies Aériennes^{‡} Operable runway length per national aviation authority

Goma International Airport (IATA: GOM, ICAO: FZNA) (French: Aéroport International de Goma), colloquially known by its acronym AIG based on its French name, is the primary international airport serving Goma, the capital of North Kivu province in the Democratic Republic of the Congo. Located in the Karisimbi commune, the airport lies approximately 2 kilometres from Goma's city center and is strategically positioned between the active Nyiragongo volcano to the north and the gas-laden Lake Kivu. The airport is situated along the road to Rutshuru and is bordered by Murara, Virunga, and Majengo neighborhoods to the east and west, Mikeno (Birere) to the south, and Majengo to the north.

== History ==
In 1948, the colonial authorities conceptualized the idea of building an unpaved runway capable of accommodating light aircraft with a maximum weight of 5.7 tonnes. In 1959, the runway underwent redevelopment and asphalting, which allowed the aerodrome to handle small and medium-haul aircraft like the DC3 and DC4. Seven years later, in 1966, the runway was extended from 1,500 to 2,000 metres, allowing larger aircraft such as the DC-6 to operate from the aerodrome. In the following years, plans were made to construct an international airport in the former Kivu region, with Rutshuru initially chosen to house the airport's facilities. However, this initiative encountered delays due to Rutshuru's topographical characteristics, particularly its location within a basin that posed substantial risks to air traffic operations. Moreover, environmental concerns, notably the disturbance caused by aircraft noise in proximity to a nearby Virunga National Park, necessitated the relocation of the project to Goma.

In March 1976, the work was entrusted to a consortium of three French construction companies: Dumez Afrique, Société Générale d'Entreprises (now Vinci SA), and Spie Batignolles. However, the work was significantly disrupted by the eruption of the Nyiragongo volcano on 10 January 1977, which resulted in lava flows halting just north of the Munigi groupement in the Bukumu Chiefdom, only about three kilometres from the northern end of the airport's runway. Construction resumed after the population, who had taken refuge in neighboring Rwanda, returned to Goma.

By March 1978, the airport had been fully completed and modernized to conform with international civil aviation standards. The runway was further extended to a length of 3,000 metres and equipped with advanced lighting and navigational aids, including the PAPI (Precision Approach Path Indicator) situated at the southern end. The airport was officially inaugurated as Goma International Airport, capable of handling large aircraft such as DC-10s, DC-8s, and Boeing 707s. Due to the proximity of the Nyiragongo volcano, takeoffs and landings were restricted to the southerly approach (runway 35), which remains unimpeded and secure, flying over the town and the adjacent Lake Kivu.

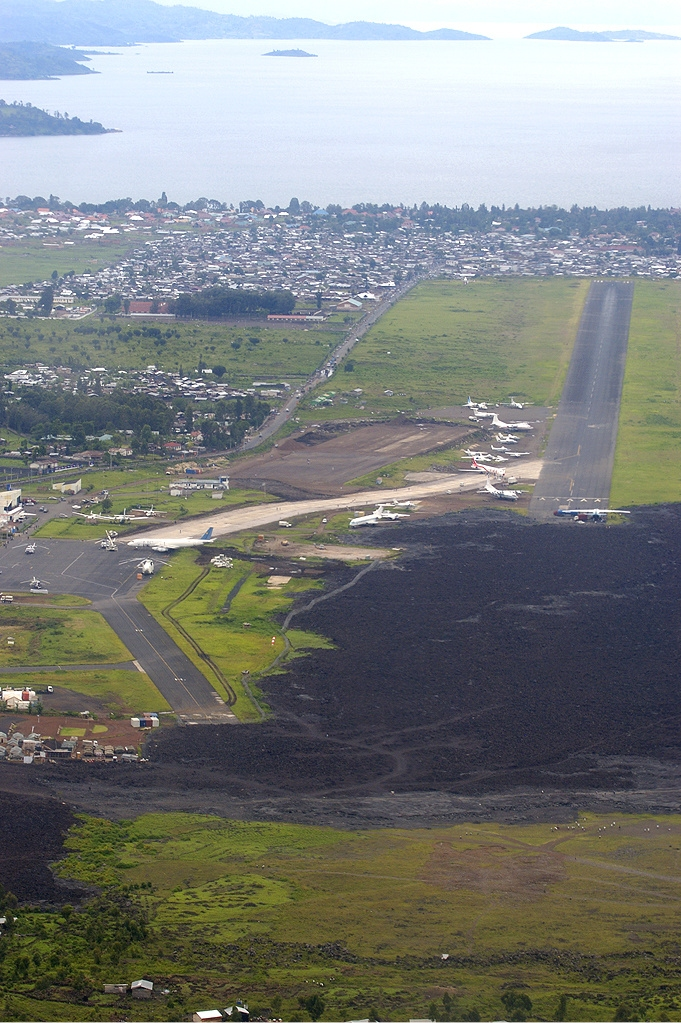
The runway covered in lava after the 2002 eruption

In January 2002, AIG was severely affected by the eruption of the Nyiragongo volcano, which covered part of the runway with lava. The eruption destroyed approximately 1,532 metres of the runway, with 200,000 cubic metres of lava covering half of it. This left the terminal and apron isolated, as a 200-metre-wide lava flow extended through the city center and toward Lake Kivu. Despite these challenges, a renovated runway was reopened to the Congolese authorities by July 2002, although only smaller aircraft could operate, primarily for freight missions by relief agencies and the United Nations.

Following the eruption, efforts were made to rehabilitate AIG. In December 2012, work began on cleaning and securing the site, and in September 2014, the Congolese government sought funding from the World Bank for further renovations. On 2 April 2015, a $52 million grant agreement was signed, with additional support from United Nations Organization Stabilization Mission in the Democratic Republic of the Congo (MONUSCO). In August 2015, President Joseph Kabila inaugurated the refurbished runway, which was extended to 2,665 metres, funded by the German aid organization Agro Action Allemande (AAA) at a cost of €16 million. Kabila also launched an extension project to increase the runway's length by 400 metres to accommodate larger aircraft.

Work on this extension was delayed, but in March 2019, the Chinese company China First Highway Engineering Co (CFHEC) began construction on the runway expansion. By July 2020, a $3.78 million project to expand the airport's apron from 16,000 to 24,000 square metres was completed, allowing the airport to accommodate up to seven Airbus A320 aircraft. AIG also recovered the full 3,000-metre length of its runway. News reports first indicated that lava from the 2021 Mount Nyiragongo eruption reached the airport. It was later confirmed that AIG was unaffected. Further work continued, and on 30 November 2021, AIG inaugurated a new 26-metre-high control tower.

During the M23 offensive (2022–present), the airport was reported to have been taken by the March 23 Movement (M23) during the Battle of Goma in January 2025.

== Facilities ==
AIG complex includes eight key buildings: the electric power plant building, fire-fighting building, weather building, general means building, passenger terminal, small carrier hangar, and the administrative block. Additionally, the airport is supported by a water tower and several radio navigation stations, including VOR (VHF Omnidirectional Range), DME (Distance Measuring Equipment), and NDB (Non-Directional Beacon). Outside the main airport premises, the Congolese air transport authority, Régie des Voies Aériennes (RVA), operates workers' housing camps, such as Camp Dumez, which provides accommodations for its staff.

== Airlines and destinations ==
Airlines	Destinations
Air Congo	Kalemie, Kindu, Kinshasa–N'djili, Kisangani, Lubumbashi
Compagnie Africaine d'Aviation	Beni, Bunia, Kavumu, Kindu, Kinshasa–N'djili, Kisangani
Congo Airways	Kindu, Kinshasa–N'djili, Kisangani
Ethiopian Airlines	Addis Ababa, Bujumbura

== Military use ==
Goma International Airport is used by both the Air Force of the Democratic Republic of the Congo and MONUSCO peacekeeping forces.

== Accidents and incidents ==
- On 15 April 2008, Hewa Bora Airways Flight 122, a Hewa Bora Airways McDonnell Douglas DC-9-51 (registration 9Q-CHN) overshot the runway during an aborted takeoff and crashed into the marketplace immediately to the south of the airport, killing 3 passengers and 37 people on the ground.
- On 19 November 2009, Compagnie Africaine d'Aviation Flight 3711, operated by McDonnell Douglas MD-82 (registration 9Q-CAB) bound from Kinshasa overran the runway on landing, suffering substantial damage. The overrun area was contaminated by solidified lava.
- On 4 March 2013, 2013 Compagnie Africaine d'Aviation crash, a Compagnie Africaine d'Aviation Fokker 50 (registration 9Q-CBD) from Lodja crashed into a residential area short of landing in heavy rain at 17:55 local time. Among the 9 crew and passengers, 6 were killed.
- On 24 November 2019, 2019 Busy Bee crash, a 19-seat airplane from local carrier Busy Bee en route to Beni Airport crashed shortly after takeoff around 9:10 a.m. At least 27 died, including some on the ground.

== See also ==
- Transport in the Democratic Republic of the Congo
- List of airports in the Democratic Republic of the Congo
