= Lubumbashi International Airport =

Lubumbashi International Airport Aéroport international de Lubumbashi
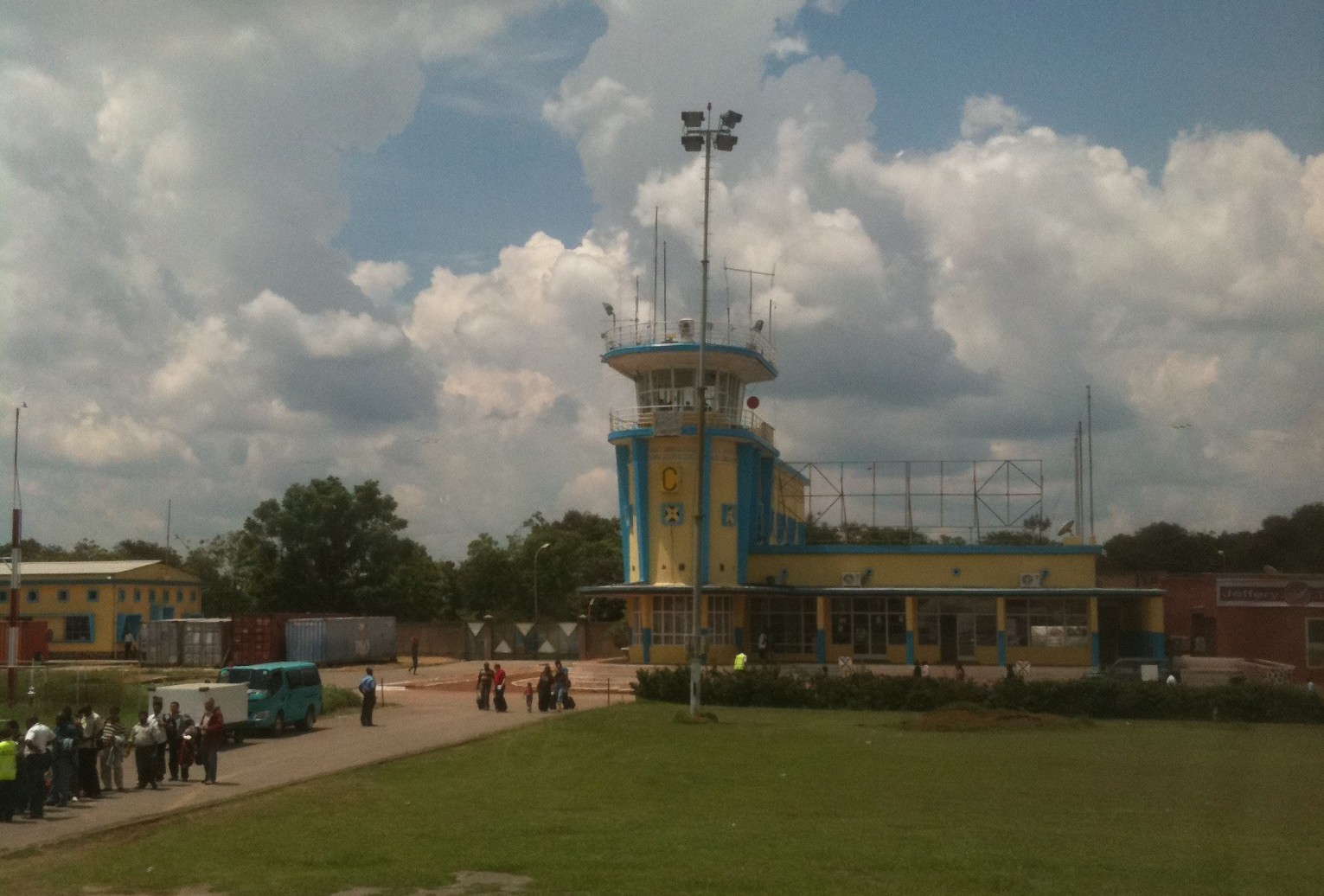
- IATA: FBM; ICAO: FZQA

Summary
- Airport type: Public
- Serves: Lubumbashi
- Location: Lubumbashi, Democratic Republic of the Congo
- Elevation AMSL: 4,295 ft (1,309 m)
- Coordinates: 11°35′28.80″S 27°31′51.52″E
- Website: lubumbashiairport.com

Map
- Location of Airport in Democratic Republic of the Congo

Runways
| Direction | Length | | Surface |
| Direction | m | ft | Surface |
|---|---|---|---|
| 07/25 | 3,203 | 10,509 | Asphalt |

Lubumbashi International Airport (IATA: FBM, ICAO: FZQA) is an airport serving Lubumbashi, Democratic Republic of the Congo.

== History ==
Lubumbashi International Airport was founded in colonial times as the Elisabethville Airport. It was also known as Luano Airport. This airport played a high-profile role during the Katanga war. After it was seized by the United Nations Force in the Congo (ONUC) troops, the airport was used as a base against the secessionist government.

== Airlines and destinations ==
=== Passenger ===
| Airlines | Destinations |
|---|---|
| Air Congo | Kinshasa–N'djili |
| Airlink | Johannesburg–O. R. Tambo |
| Air Tanzania | Dar es Salaam |
| Compagnie Africaine d'Aviation | Kalemie, Kamina, Kinshasa–N'djili, Kolwezi, Mbuji-Mayi |
| Congo Airways | Johannesburg–O. R. Tambo, Kananga, Kinshasa–N'djili,Mbuji-Mayi |
| Ethiopian Airlines | Addis Ababa |
| Etihad Airways | Abu Dhabi (begins 24 March 2027) |
| Kenya Airways | Nairobi–Jomo Kenyatta |
| Mahogany Air | Lusaka, Ndola |
| RwandAir | Kigali |
| South African Airways | Johannesburg–O. R. Tambo |

== Accidents and incidents ==
- In December 2001, Air Katanga Douglas C-53-DO ZS-OJD was written off in a landing accident at Lubumbashi International Airport after a delivery flight that originated in South Africa.
- On 15 September 1961 a Katangese Air Force Fouga CM.170 Magister dropped two 100 lb. bombs on the airport, one of which made a direct hit on a DC-4-1009 belonging to Air Katanga with the registration OO-ADN. There were no casualties, but the aircraft was written off.

== See also ==
- Transport in the Democratic Republic of the Congo
- List of airports in the Democratic Republic of the Congo
