= Kisangani Bangoka International Airport =

Airport in Kisangani, Democratic Republic of the Congo

Kisangani Bangoka International Airport Aéroport international de Kisangani-Bangoka
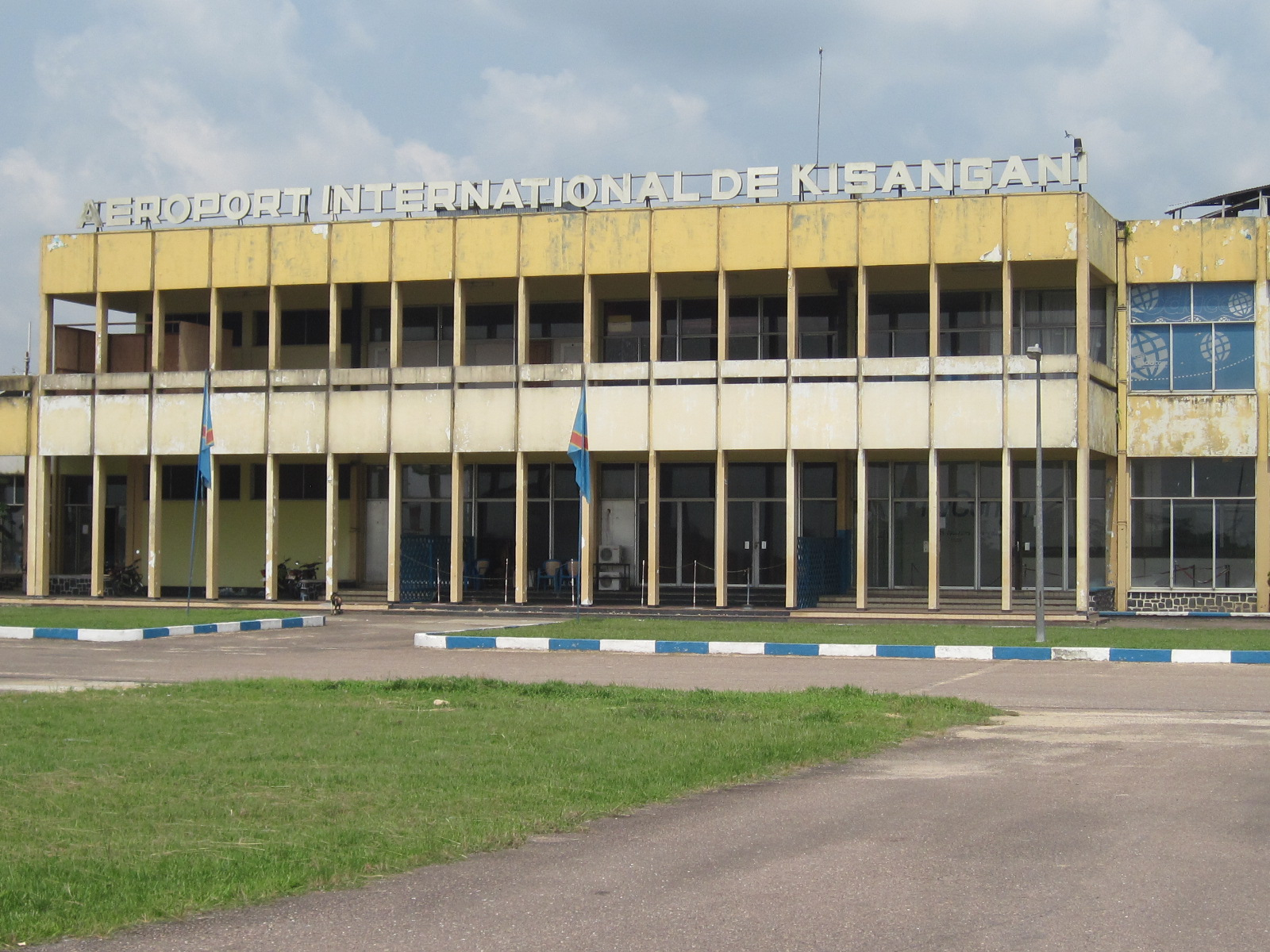
- IATA: FKI; ICAO: FZIC

Summary
- Airport type: Public
- Serves: Kisangani, Democratic Republic of the Congo
- Elevation AMSL: 1,417 ft (432 m)
- Coordinates: 00°28′54″N 025°20′17″E

Map
- Location of Bangoka International Airport in DRC

Runways
Direction	Length		Surface
Direction	m	ft	Surface
13/31	3,500	11,483	Asphalt
- Sources: GCM Google Maps

Kisangani Bangoka International Airport (IATA: FKI, ICAO: FZIC) is an airport serving Kisangani, Democratic Republic of the Congo. The airport is 12 kilometres (7.5 mi) east of the city. The Bangoka VOR/DME (Ident: KGI) is 1.7 nautical miles (3.1 km) west of the airport.

== Airlines and destinations ==
Airlines	Destinations
Air Congo	Kindu, Kinshasa–N'djili
Compagnie Africaine d'Aviation	Goma, Kinshasa–N'djili

== Accidents and incidents ==
- On July 8, 2011, Hewa Bora Airways Flight 952, operated by a Boeing 727, crashed on landing. 74 of the 118 on board died.
- On the weekend of January 31 to February 1, 2026, the Congo River Alliance and M23 carried out a drone attack on the airport. Authorities said eight drones were intercepted.
- On 1 March 2026, a drone attack blamed on M23 was carried out on the airport. Four drones were intercepted.

== See also ==
- Transport in the Democratic Republic of the Congo
- List of airports in the Democratic Republic of the Congo
