= N'djili International Airport =

International airport serving Kinshasa, Democratic Republic of the Congo

N'djili International Airport Aéroport International de N'djili
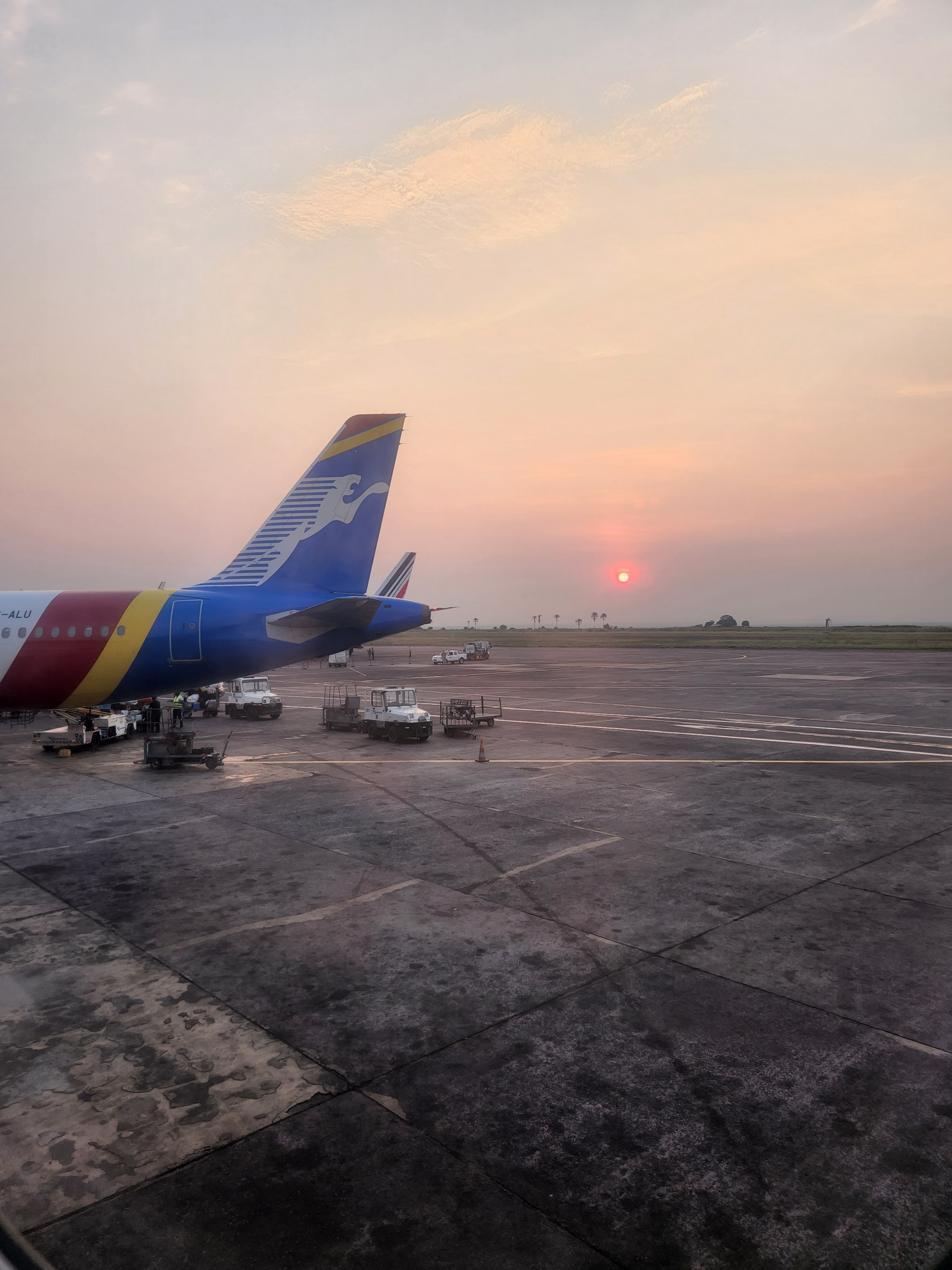
- IATA: FIH; ICAO: FZAA

Summary
- Airport type: Public
- Owner: Government of the Democratic Republic of the Congo
- Operator: Régie des Voies Aériennes
- Serves: Kinshasa, Democratic Republic of the Congo
- Location: Nsele, Kinshasa
- Opened: February 1959; 67 years ago
- Hub for: Air Congo; Congo Airways
- Elevation AMSL: 313 m (1,027 ft)
- Coordinates: 4°23′14″S 15°26′32″E
- Website: Official website

Map
- Location of Airport in Democratic Republic of the Congo

Runways
Direction	Length		Surface
Direction	m	ft	Surface
06/24	3,300	15,420	Asphalt

Statistics (2014)
- Passengers: 773,338

N'djili International Airport (IATA: FIH, ICAO: FZAA) (French: Aéroport International de N'djili), also known as Kinshasa International Airport, is the principal international airport serving Kinshasa. Named after the nearby Ndjili River, it is located in the commune of Nsele on the edge of the Pool Malebo, about 20 kilometers east of the city, to which it is connected by Lumumba Boulevard. The airport is bordered by the communes of Nsele, Masina, and Kimbanseke, with nearby quartiers including Mikonga, Talangayi, Bibua, Menkao, Kinkole, and Kingasani. Operated by the state-owned Régie des Voies Aériennes (RVA), it is the busiest airport in the country by both passenger traffic and aircraft movements.

Construction began in 1953, and the airport was inaugurated in 1959, replacing Ndolo Airport as the city's principal commercial airport. When it opened in 1959, its 4,700 m runway was among the longest in the world, and during the Second Republic, the airport became the country's principal international gateway. Since the early 21st century, N'djili has undergone modernization, including reconstruction of its main runway, which was shortened from 4,700 to about 3,300 m (15,420 to about 10,830 ft).

== History ==
=== 1953–1959: Colonial planning and construction ===
N'djili International Airport was constructed during the Belgian colonial period in the early 1950s, when the present-day Democratic Republic of the Congo was known as the Belgian Congo and its capital was Léopoldville (now Kinshasa). Construction officially began in 1953, with the airport designed by Belgian architect Léon Marcel Chapeaux, who also contributed to airport projects in Brussels and Kuala Lumpur. Costing approximately US$17 million, the complex was linked to Léopoldville by a four-lane highway named after King Leopold III (now Boulevard Lumumba), which also served as the principal route to eastern Congo. The airport was also intended to symbolize Belgium's achievements in its African colony.

The site was chosen on a sandy plateau about 20 km east of Léopoldville and parallel to the Congo River. Its natural topography required little earthmoving, while streams on either side provided effective drainage. Additional land to the south was reserved for future residential expansion. During construction in 1955–56, residents of a Teke-Humbu village were relocated to Mikonga in Nsele to make way for the airport. Planners also planned to close Ndolo Airport and extend Boulevard Lumumba into the city centre. The N'djili airport officially opened in February 1959 in the Nsele commune, with the Nd'jili commune lying just about five kilometers to the west along Boulevard Lumumba. This administrative anomaly arose because the surrounding unincorporated area was then known as the "Territoire Suburbain de Ndjili". After Nsele was established in 1967 as a commune, it sought jurisdiction over the airport, but the facility remained administratively attached to N'djili commune until 1982. At the time of its inauguration, the airport's main runway measured 4,700 meters (15,420 feet), which ranked among the world's longest at the time and was capable of accommodating the largest aircraft then in service, with operations possible from the runway's central section.

=== 1960–1965: Independence and the Congo Crisis ===
After its opening, N'djili became the principal hub of the Belgian national airline Sabena, and served as the main arrival point for foreign delegations attending the Congolese independence celebrations in June 1960. On 29 June, King Baudouin arrived at the airport, where he was received by President-designate Joseph Kasavubu and Prime Minister-designate Patrice Lumumba. Delegations from around the world also arrived by air, including a Soviet mission seeking to establish diplomatic relations with the newly independent state. N'djili played a significant operational role during the early stages of the Congo Crisis. Following the mutiny of the Force Publique, thousands of expatriates fled the country. Sabena suspended its regular international services and organized a large-scale evacuation, airlifting approximately 25,000 people between 9 and 28 July 1960. When Force Publique attempted to take control of the airport, Belgian paratroopers intervened, which led to fighting inside the airport's terminal. Soon afterward, the United Nations began deploying peacekeeping forces through N'djili, with the first 700 Ghanaian troops arriving on 15 July aboard British aircraft, followed by successive United States Air Force C-130 Hercules flights carrying Tunisian soldiers. Belgian forces withdrew from the airport on 21 July after the arrival of UN contingents.

The United Nations initially based its air operations at Ndolo Airport, where a contingent of 40 Swedish Air Force pilots and mechanics operated aircraft using equipment and spare parts left behind by the Belgians. By September 1960, however, security concerns prompted the transfer of the Indian and Italian C-119 Flying Boxcar squadron to the N'djili airport, while overall UN air operations were coordinated from the large Kamina Air Base in Katanga. N'djili itself featured two large hangars situated approximately one kilometer on either side of the passenger terminal. The western hangar remained in civilian use, whereas the eastern hangar was occupied by the United States Congo Military Mission (COMISH). Prime Minister Lumumba became increasingly frustrated by restrictions on domestic travel. He initially relied on the governor-general's Force Publique de Havilland Heron aircraft, but it was transferred to Kamina along with other Belgian-controlled aircraft, many of which later formed the nucleus of the Katangese Air Force. In August 1960, the Soviet Union supplied Lumumba's government with an Ilyushin Il-14 executive aircraft, followed later that month by twelve additional Il-14 transport aircraft to support military operations against the secession of South Kasai. The first of these transports arrived at N'djili on 2 September, but four days later the United Nations closed all airports in the Congo, which effectively prevented Lumumba from using the aircraft.

Ndolo Airport continued to serve as the city's general aviation airport, and, after the relocation of Force Publique aviation to N'djili in 1955, three pilots established the airline Air Brousse in response to Sabena's monopoly and comparatively high airfares. By the eve of independence, Air Brousse operated a fleet of four de Havilland Dragon Rapide biplanes and four Piper Tri-Pacers. One of the airline's Dragon Rapides was chartered by the Congolese government in January 1961 to transport Lumumba from Thysville (now Mbanza-Ngungu) to Moanda, circumventing UN flight restrictions before his transfer to Katanga, where he was subsequently assassinated.

In January 1961, the Congolese government and Sabena agreed to establish a national airline, Air Congo, which officially began operations in June of that year. Under the ownership arrangement, the Congolese government held a 65% stake, Sabena retained 30% and managed the airline, while Air Brousse and the Belgian charter carrier Sobelair shared the remaining interest. On international services, the airline's Boeing 707 aircraft carried the "Air Congo" name on the fuselage while retaining Sabena's distinctive white "S" on the empennage.

Following the secession of Katanga and the loss of the former Force Publique aircraft, the Congolese government established its first air force unit at Ndolo Airport in January 1962. Its initial fleet consisted of a Douglas DC-4 and three Douglas DC-3 aircraft acquired from France. The unit was formally inaugurated in a ceremony attended by Joseph-Désiré Mobutu, Prime Minister Cyrille Adoula, the United States ambassador, and American and British military attachés. A pilot training school was also established, although Western governments remained concerned about the country's limited air capabilities.

After a proposal to rebuild the Congolese National Army (Armée nationale congolaise; ANC) with NATO technical assistance was blocked by the United Nations, the Central Intelligence Agency organized an interim air force staffed primarily by anti-Fidel Castro Cuban pilots, many of whom had participated in the Bay of Pigs invasion. By November 1962, the first six Cuban pilots, recruited through Caribbean Aeromarine, had arrived to operate U.S.-supplied North American T-6 Texan trainers. These aircraft were later employed in support of Congolese army operations against insurgents in Kwilu Province during early 1964. At the same time, Italy assisted in training the Congolese Air Force (Force Aérienne Congolaise; FAC). As rebel forces advanced toward Léopoldville in 1964, the government established the Centre d'Entraînement des Troupes Aéroportées (CETA), a paratroop training center at the N'djili airport operated with Israeli assistance in August. The base was intended to train airborne troops and to defend the airport and the eastern approaches to the capital. Maintenance and operational support for the FAC was contracted to the Western International Ground Maintenance Organization (WIGMO), a Liechtenstein-registered company that functioned as a CIA front. WIGMO employed foreign mercenary pilots and ground crews and shared the military facilities at N'djili with the COMISH.

In November 1964, the N'djili airport received aircraft transporting hostages rescued during Operation Dragon Rouge in Stanleyville and northeastern Congo. United States Air Force C-130 Hercules aircraft, which had carried Belgian paratroopers into Stanleyville, subsequently returned with numerous evacuated civilians. Despite the airport's normally strict security measures, public access to the apron was unusually permitted during the operation. In August 1965, a civil aviation training institute was established at Ndolo Airport under United Nations sponsorship. The institution later evolved into the Institut Supérieur des Techniques Appliquées (ISTA).

=== 1966–2003: Expansion under Mobutu, wars and decline ===
In January 1966, N'djili became the hub of another major international airlift when Rhodesia's Unilateral Declaration of Independence "cut off Zambia's fuel supplies". The United States chartered Pan American World Airways and Trans World Airlines to operate Boeing 707 flights to Lubumbashi through N'djili, while Canada contributed Canadair Yukon transport aircraft. Fuel transported by air was then moved overland to Zambia, with the operation expected to deliver approximately 6,000 tons during January and February 1966.

Under Ordinance-Law No. 66/415 of 13 July 1966, the Congolese government transferred several Sabena-owned buildings in Kinshasa, most of them located along Boulevard du 30 Juin in Gombe, to state ownership. According to the ordinance, the measure responded to Belgium's refusal to transfer properties in Belgium belonging to the Congolese public transport company Office d'Exploitation des Transports au Congo (OTRACO). The ordinance presented the transfer of Sabena's properties as compensation for the disputed OTRACO assets. The Congolese state retained ownership of the buildings, while their management and administration were entrusted to OTRACO.

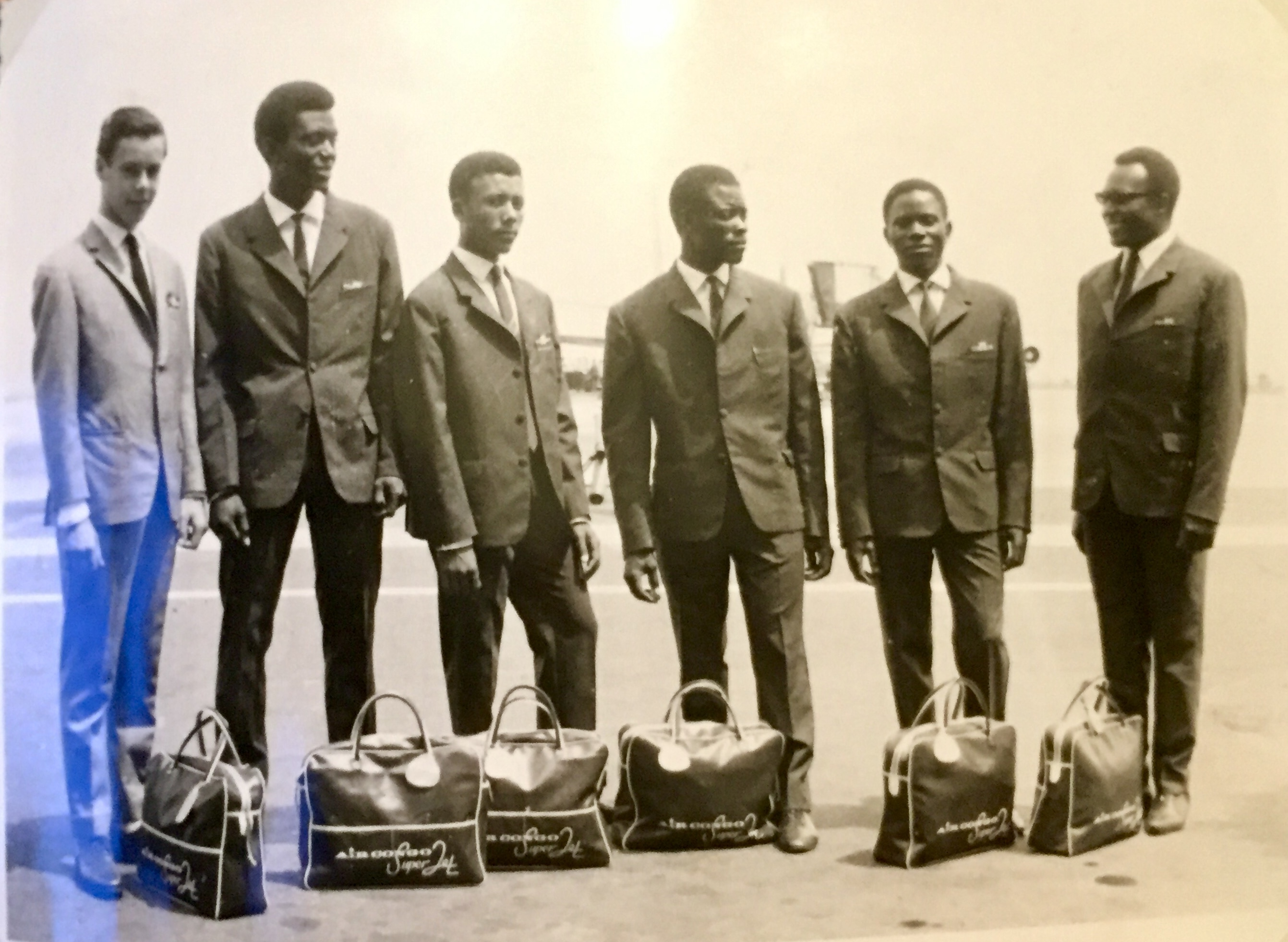
Congolese cyclists at the apron of the airport before departing for a training camp in Belgium, September 1967.

In 1968, OTRACO inaugurated a commuter rail service linking central Kinshasa with the N'djili airport, using a French-built locomotive and passenger coaches acquired from the United Kingdom. In 1975, the Régie des Voies Aériennes (RVA) designated Ndolo Airport for light aircraft and business aviation, while N'djili became responsible for domestic and international commercial services "until a new international airport was built". That same year, Urban Commissioner Sakombi Inongo temporarily relocated the Pont Kasa-Vubu market to Avenue Lukolela, where it became known as Somba Zikida. The "Pont Kasavubu market was originally a temporary location while the Central Market was under construction in 1968, but the sellers didn't want to lose their clientele".

In January 1993, an overloaded Trans Service Airlift Nord 262 overshot the runway during takeoff, causing the deaths of six people on the ground. Public outrage and concerns over operating an airport in a heavily urbanized area prompted the government to close Ndolo Airport and move civil aviation operations to N'djili. On 18 January 1995, a Miabi Air Antonov An-32, operated by the now-defunct Zairean charter and humanitarian airline, crashed while landing at Ndolo, killing 34 passengers and crew members. On 8 January 1996, another overloaded Antonov-32 leased by Air Africa failed to gain altitude on take-off from Ndolo and crashed into the crowded Somba Zikida market. The fuel explosion killed more than 200 people and injured 253 others on the ground, making it the deadliest aircraft accident in history in terms of non-passenger fatalities. The aircraft had been leased from Scibe Airlift, owned by businessman Jeannot Bemba Saolona, often referred to as "Mobutu's banker", and was transporting weapons to UNITA forces in Angola.

In September 1996, the Belgian construction company Besix reportedly secured a contract to rehabilitate N'djili, but the project was abandoned after the collapse of Mobutu's government in 1997. Later that year, under the administration of Laurent-Désiré Kabila, the firm Sterling-IGF submitted a separate proposal to modernize the airport. These plans were halted after the outbreak of the Second Congo War in August 1998, when Rwandan-backed RCD forces advanced toward Kinshasa after capturing Kitona Air Base. On 26 August, rebel forces launched an attack on N'djili from Kasangulu but were repelled three days later by Congolese and Zimbabwean troops. Throughout the conflict, the airport remained a strategic logistical hub supporting military operations across the country.

By the early 21st century, much of the airport's infrastructure had become outdated. In April 2000, a fire exploded in a warehouse adjacent to the apron while ammunition was being loaded, destroying four aircraft, killing more than 100 people, and severely damaging part of the terminal building. After the assassination of Laurent-Désiré Kabila in January 2001, the airport had fallen into a state of severe disrepair. The terminal suffered from deteriorating facilities, makeshift check-in counters, inoperative baggage systems, and a runway that had become badly cracked. Passengers also reported persistent harassment by airport officials and unauthorized individuals. In 2002, the Italian company Gestari established an office in Kinshasa to participate in the rehabilitation of the N'djili airport. After the formation of the Transitional Government in 2003, renewed efforts were made to improve Kinshasa's aviation infrastructure. Congestion at N'djili prompted calls to reopen Ndolo Airport, whose restoration was announced by Transport Minister Joseph Olenghankoy with support from Belgian Technical Cooperation (Coopération technique belge; CTB). During the same period, South African investors proposed constructing a new US$254 million airport on RVA-owned land opposite N'djili, although the proposal was ultimately abandoned.

=== 2004–present: Modernization ===
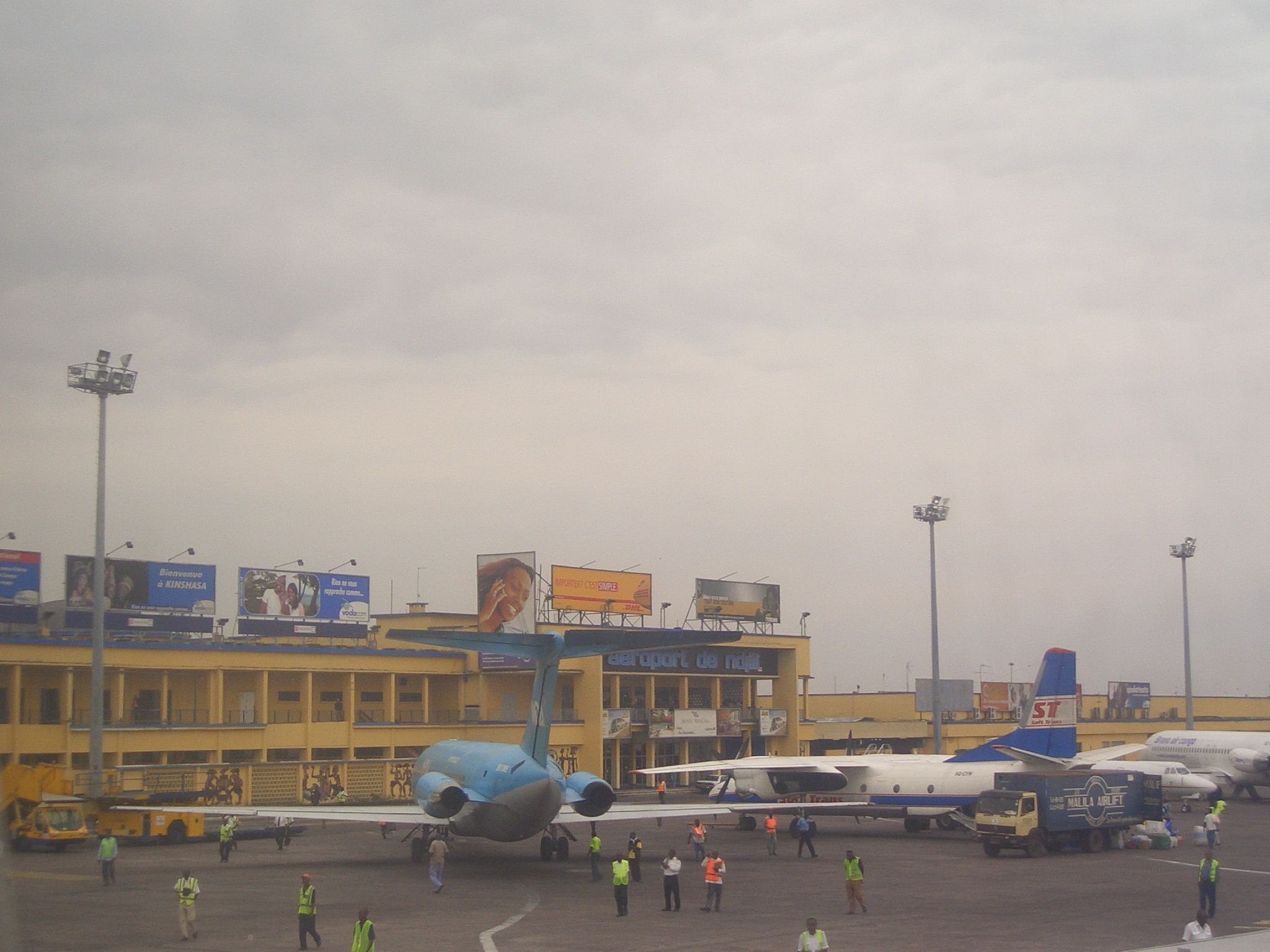
Terminal building in 2007

In February 2004, reports indicated that a Belgian-based company had reached an agreement with the RVA to rehabilitate the airport, almost five decades after Belgium had begun constructing the original facility. In April, representatives of the Teke and Humbu requested that the RVA renegotiate the 1948 land concession under which the airport had been established. In May 2004, the Council of Ministers approved the reopening of Ndolo Airport to ease congestion at N'djili, and Olenghankoy officially reopened the airport in July. During the 2006 general elections, a contingent of approximately 750 personnel from the European Union Force Bosnia and Herzegovina (EUFOR) established a base at Ndolo Airport to reinforce the United Nations Mission in the Democratic Republic of Congo (MONUC). The force also deployed unmanned aerial vehicles for surveillance and monitoring operations. On 4 October 2007, an Antonov An-26 leased by Africa One from Malila Airlift crashed into the Kingasani quartier of the Kimbanseke commune shortly after departing N'djili, killing several people. The government subsequently banned the use of outdated and unregistered aircraft that dominated the country's domestic airline and charter fleets, which had already been prohibited from operating within the European Union. In May 2009, President Joseph Kabila launched a programme to modernize N'djili Airport. To finance the works, a "Go Pass" departure fee was introduced for domestic and international passengers, with proceeds directed toward repaying rehabilitation loans. Initial improvements focused on the runway, a new control tower, and a passenger terminal, while a VIP lounge was completed in preparation for the 50th anniversary of Congolese independence in June 2010. In 2012, the terminal received additional renovations ahead of the Francophonie summit, including the installation of a bronze-glass façade on the colonial-era building.

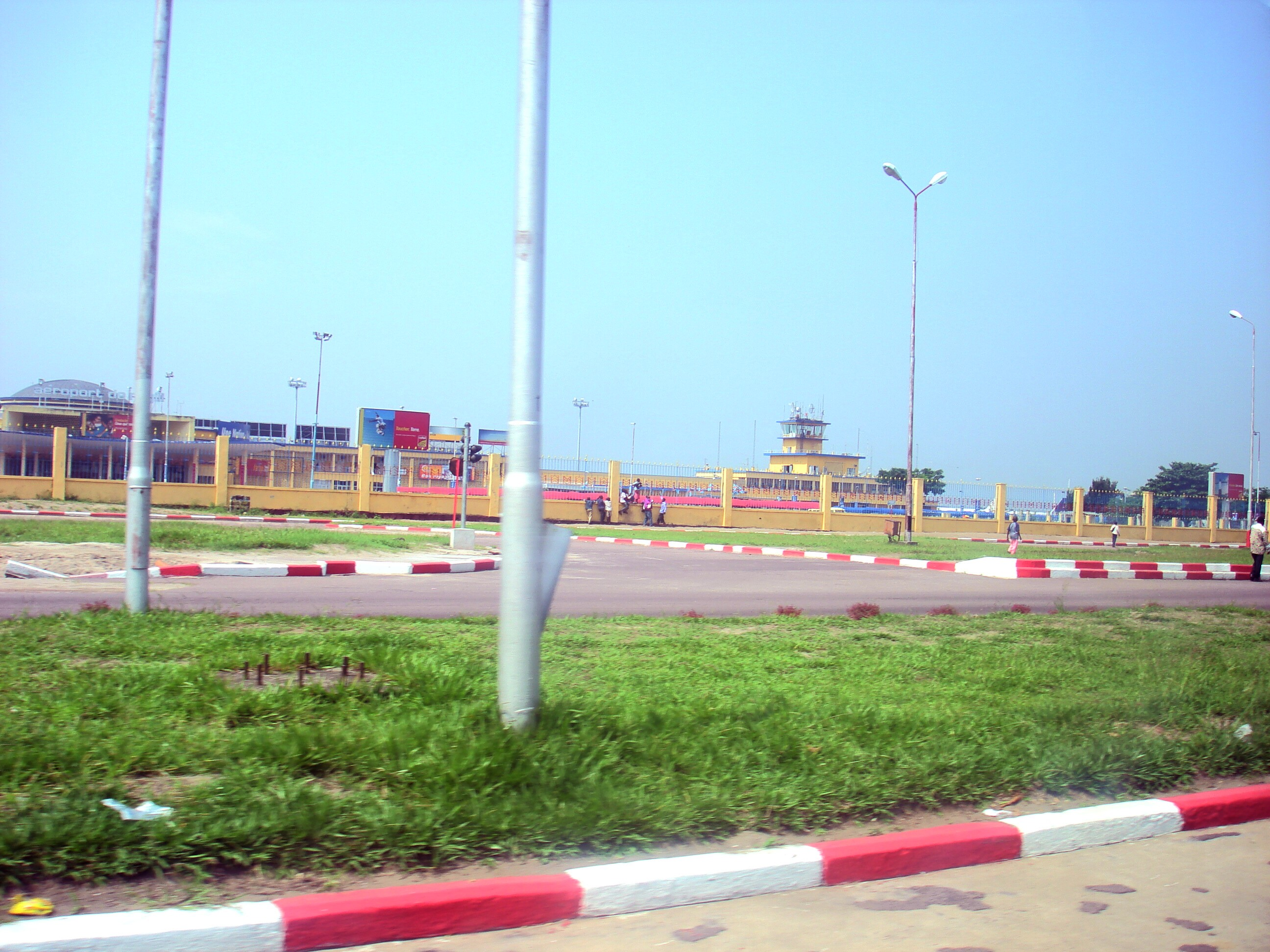
Entrance to the airport, viewed from Boulevard Lumumba, in 2007.

According to Arlette Balenga Itanza, the Ministry of Transport and the RVA subsequently implemented a nationwide airport modernization programme during the early 2010s that focused on major airports including N'djili, Lubumbashi International Airport, Kisangani Bangoka International Airport, and Goma International Airport. As part of the programme, N'djili's main runway was reconstructed and shortened from 4,700 meters to approximately 3,300 meters, while its pavement was strengthened. Other upgrades were carried out under the Priority Air Safety Project (PPSA) between 2010 and 2015, financed principally by the African Development Bank (AfDB), with additional support from the World Bank, the Infrastructure Development Fund (IDEF), and other financial institutions. The wider modernization programme involved an estimated investment of US$642 million, including US$159.56 million in priority operations under the PPSA. The works included the construction of a new passenger terminal, an air traffic control tower, a technical building, an airport fire and rescue station, and new radio navigation and communication systems.

At the end of 2012, the RVA awarded Alpha Airport a contract to construct a temporary passenger terminal, while ADPI-SYSTRA was commissioned in February 2013 to undertake a feasibility study for a proposed US$600 million permanent terminal. In June 2013, Prime Minister Matata Ponyo announced the construction of a temporary US$22 million terminal that would remain operational while the new facility was built, with the existing rotunda continuing to serve domestic flights. Other upgrades completed in 2014 included a resurfaced runway, a new air traffic control tower, and firefighting facilities built to ICAO standards with funding from Chinese sources and the African Development Bank. In June 2015, a new international terminal was opened which can service one million passengers per year.

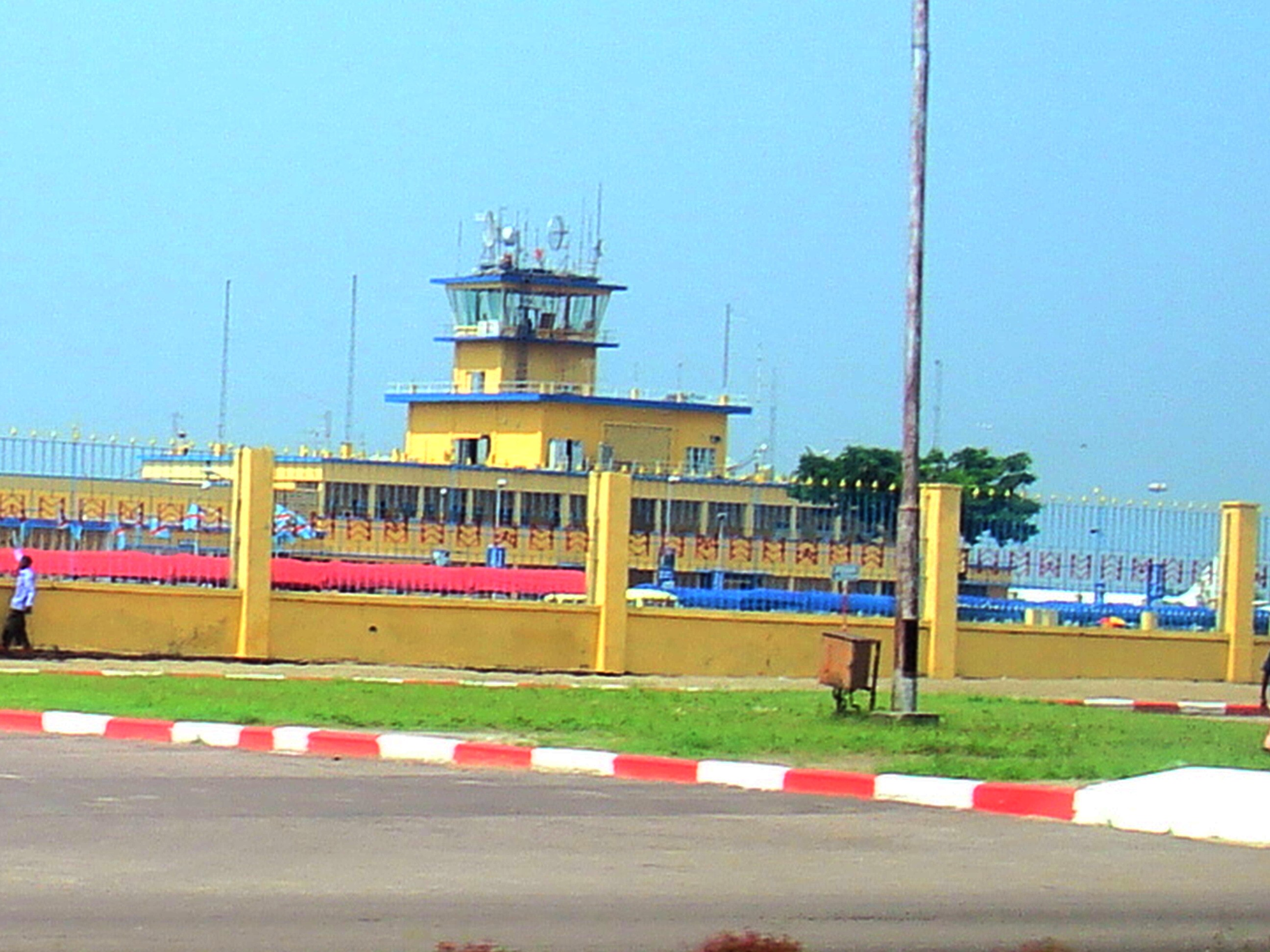
View of the air traffic control tower in 2007.

In May 2018, President Joseph Kabila launched the construction project for a new 40,000 square meters terminal and contracted the project to the Chinese firm Weihai International Economic and Technical Cooperative (WIETC). The development also included expanded aircraft parking areas and additional airport facilities, and was designed to accommodate approximately three million passengers annually. Its estimated cost was reported differently, with some sources placing the value at US$364.9 million and others at US$340 million. Implementation was delayed due to difficulties in obtaining financing. The Congolese authorities entered negotiations with the Export–Import Bank of China (Eximbank of China) that year to secure financial support, but no funds had been disbursed by 2023. The government had already committed US$20 million toward the project, while WIETC reportedly provided US$10 million in advance financing. In June 2023, the Félix Tshisekedi administration terminated the contract with WIETC and transferred responsibility for the project to the Turkish company Milvest after discussions between Prime Minister Jean-Michel Sama Lukonde and Milvest head Turhan Mildon regarding the airport rehabilitation programme on 2 May. WIETC contested the termination and announced plans to pursue arbitration over the contract termination.

In February 2024, the agreement with Milvest envisaged completing the rehabilitation works over two years, with financing exceeding US$1.2 billion (725.5 billion CFA francs). However, in December 2024, Deputy Prime Minister for Transport Jean-Pierre Bemba stated that Milvest would no longer participate in the redevelopment.

In June 2025, the rehabilitation project was awarded to Kinshasa-based company Infrarose for a period of 36 months. The planned works include the construction of a two-level terminal of approximately 50,000 square meters with capacity for five million passengers annually, new boarding bridges, expanded airport apron, a cargo facility, a category 7–9 airport fire and rescue building, improved runway lighting, rehabilitation of existing runways, construction of additional civil and military runway infrastructure, and upgrades to the airport perimeter and landside facilities. In July 2025, the American architectural firm Skidmore, Owings & Merrill (SOM) was selected to oversee the airport's reconstruction design, while Infrarose continued to lead the project development through private-sector financing rather than conventional multilateral funding models often used for major airport projects in Africa. In early 2026, SOM presented a new terminal concept valued at approximately US$570 million. The terminal design incorporates architectural references to Congolese heritage and is formed from a grid of square modular hyperbolic paraboloids, known in engineering as hypars. The canopy creates a rippling surface that filters natural daylight into the terminal below. The geometry draws inspiration from traditional Congolese basketry, whose woven patterns share a similar mathematical logic with the hypar module. Interior materials reflect the colors and textures of the Congolese landscape, incorporating mineral-inspired finishes that evoke local earth and stone.

By April 2026, renovation work on parts of the existing terminal had progressed, with the terminal rotunda repainted, new lighting equipment installed, and a centralized generator added. The renovated rotunda was inaugurated on 30 June by President Tshisekedi, who also received a new Air Congo Boeing 787-800 aircraft for international flights, with a capacity of 360 to 380 passengers.

== Composition and facilities ==
The airport is managed by the Régie des Voies Aériennes (RVA) through technical, administrative, security, meteorological, and air traffic divisions that oversee daily operations.

The airport contains several aprons designed for different operational purposes. The central apron, commonly referred to as the "tarmac", serves domestic and international airlines and includes aircraft parking stands and refueling facilities. A FARDC apron east of the main apron serves the Congolese Air Force and charter operations, while a western maintenance apron supports aircraft servicing near the former Lignes Aériennes Congolaises (LAC) technical hangar. The 1958 master plan established fifteen aircraft stands on the central apron, including three designated for VIP operations.

N'djili has a passenger terminal serving both domestic and international flights. It includes check-in counters, customs and immigration facilities, baggage handling systems, departure lounges, and security screening checkpoints. The terminal also houses airport administrative and operational facilities.

== Airlines and destinations ==
=== Passenger ===
Airlines	Destinations
Air Congo	Brussels, Cotonou, Dar es Salaam, Douala, Entebbe, Johannesburg–O.R. Tambo, Mbuji-Mayi, Paris–Charles de Gaulle
Air Côte d'Ivoire	Brazzaville, Libreville, Pointe-Noire
Air Kasaï	Mbuji-Mayi
Air Tanzania	Dar es Salaam
Airlink	Johannesburg–O. R. Tambo
ASKY Airlines	Lomé
Brussels Airlines	Brussels
Compagnie Africaine d'Aviation	Boende, Lodja
Congo Airways	Douala, Johannesburg–O. R. Tambo, Mbuji-Mayi
Egyptair	Cairo
Ethiopian Airlines	Addis Ababa
Etihad Airways	Abu Dhabi (begins 18 March 2027)
Kenya Airways	Nairobi–Jomo Kenyatta
Qatar Airways	Doha
Royal Air Maroc	Casablanca
South African Airways	Johannesburg–O. R. Tambo
TAAG Angola Airlines	Luanda–Agostinho Neto
Turkish Airlines	Istanbul (suspended)
Uganda Airlines	Entebbe

=== Cargo ===
Airlines	Destinations
Cargolux	Luxembourg
Ethiopian Airlines Cargo	Addis Ababa
Turkish Cargo	Istanbul, Nairobi–Jomo Kenyatta

== Traffic and statistics ==
In 2009, N'djili ranked as Africa's 39th busiest airport before dropping to 43rd place by 2016.

Air traffic statistics (2013–2016)

Years	Aircraft movements			Passengers			Freight (tonnes)			Mail (tonnes)		
	Arrivals	Departures	Total	Arrivals	Departures	Total	Arrivals	Departures	Total	Arrivals	Departures	Total
2013	9,859	9,843	19,702	372,402	381,526	753,928	35,551.517	40,852.149	76,403.666	150.305	128.160	278.465
2014	9,655	9,647	19,302	385,207	388,131	773,338	35,057.926	37,891.143	72,949.069	134.786	78.209	212.995
2015	8,666	8,662	17,328	384,666	406,907	791,573	35,592.701	35,461.413	71,054.114	79.341	48.959	128.300
2016	9,214	9,212	18,426	391,198	436,868	828,066	31,351.186	36,213.990	67,565.176	33.826	24.816	58.642
Total	37,394	37,364	74,758	1,533,473	1,613,432	3,146,905	137,533.330	150,418.695	287,972.025	398.258	280.144	678.402

Source: N'djili Airport Statistics Office (Bureau des statistiques de l'aéroport de N'djili).

== Accidents and incidents ==
- On 18 August 1968, a Douglas DC-3D 9Q-CUM of Air Congo was destroyed by fire.
- On 28 August 1984, a Vickers Viscount 9Q-CPD of Zaire Aero Service crashed after takeoff.
- In January 1993, an overloaded Trans Service Airlift Nord 262 overshot the runway during takeoff, causing the deaths of six people on the ground.
- On 4 October 2007, an Antonov An-26 leased by Africa One from Malila Airlift crashed into the Kingasani quartier of Kimbanseke soon after leaving Ndjili, killing all 21 on board and 28 people on the ground.
- On 2 January 2010, Boeing 727-231F 9Q-CAA of Compagnie Africaine d'Aviation was substantially damaged when it departed the side of the runway.
- On 4 April 2011, a Canadair CRJ-100ER 4L-GAE of Georgian Airways operating under an UN mission as flight 834 from Bangoka International Airport, Kisangani to Kinshasa missed the runway on landing at Kinshasa. The aircraft subsequently broke into pieces and caught fire. Only one survivor was reported out of 29 passengers and 4 crew. The airport was experiencing torrential rain, thunderstorms and low visibility at the time.
- On 20 December 2018 a Gomair An-26 registration 9S-AGB crashed 19 nautical miles short of Kinshasa with 7 or 8 people on board. The aircraft was found more than 24 hours later by a local. The aircraft was carrying election materials on behalf of the Central Electoral National Independent Commission (CENI).
