= List of Brussels Airlines destinations =

Brussels Airlines of Belgium serves the following destinations as of October 2025:

== List ==
Country	City	Airport	Notes	Refs
Armenia	Yerevan	Zvartnots International Airport		
Angola	Luanda	Quatro de Fevereiro Airport	Terminated	
Austria	Vienna	Vienna Airport		
Belgium	Brussels	Brussels Airport	Hub	
Benin	Cotonou	Cadjehoun Airport		
Bulgaria	Burgas	Burgas Airport	Terminated	
Bulgaria	Varna	Varna Airport	Terminated	
Burkina Faso	Ouagadougou	Ouagadougou Airport		
Burundi	Bujumbura	Bujumbura International Airport		
Cameroon	Douala	Douala International Airport		
Cameroon	Yaoundé	Yaoundé Nsimalen International Airport		
Canada	Toronto	Toronto Pearson International Airport	Terminated	
Côte d'Ivoire	Abidjan	Félix-Houphouët-Boigny International Airport		
Croatia	Dubrovnik	Dubrovnik Airport	Seasonal	
Croatia	Zagreb	Zagreb Airport	Terminated	
Croatia	Split	Split Airport	Seasonal	
Croatia	Zadar	Zadar Airport	Seasonal	
Cyprus	Paphos	Paphos International Airport	Terminated	
Czech Republic	Prague	Václav Havel Airport Prague		
Democratic Republic of Congo	Kinshasa	N'djili Airport		
Denmark	Billund	Billund Airport	Terminated	
Denmark	Copenhagen	Copenhagen Airport		
Egypt	Cairo	Cairo International Airport	Begins 29 March 2027	
Egypt	Hurghada	Hurghada International Airport		
Egypt	Sharm El Sheikh	Sharm El Sheikh International Airport	Terminated	
Finland	Kittilä	Kittilä Airport	Seasonal	
France	Ajaccio	Ajaccio Napoleon Bonaparte Airport	Terminated	
France	Bastia	Bastia – Poretta Airport	Terminated	
France	Bordeaux	Bordeaux–Mérignac Airport	Terminated	
France	Calvi	Calvi – Sainte-Catherine Airport	Terminated	
France	Figari	Figari–Sud Corse Airport	Terminated	
France	Lourdes	Tarbes–Lourdes–Pyrénées Airport	Terminated	
France	Lyon	Lyon–Saint-Exupéry Airport		
France	Marseille	Marseille Provence Airport		
France	Montpellier	Montpellier–Méditerranée Airport	Terminated	
France	Nantes	Nantes Atlantique Airport	Terminated	
France	Nice	Nice Côte d'Azur Airport		
France	Paris	Charles de Gaulle Airport		
France	Strasbourg	Strasbourg Airport	Terminated	
France	Toulouse	Toulouse–Blagnac Airport		
Gambia	Banjul	Banjul International Airport		
Germany	Berlin	Berlin Brandenburg Airport		
Germany	Berlin	Berlin Tegel Airport	Airport closed	
Germany	Berlin	Berlin Tempelhof Airport	Airport closed	
Germany	Bremen	Bremen Airport	Terminated	
Germany	Frankfurt	Frankfurt Airport		
Germany	Hamburg	Hamburg Airport		
Germany	Hanover	Hannover Airport	Terminated	
Germany	Munich	Munich Airport		
Germany	Nuremberg	Nuremberg Airport	Terminated	
Ghana	Accra	Accra International Airport		
Greece	Athens	Athens International Airport		
Greece	Chania	Chania International Airport	Seasonal	
Greece	Corfu	Corfu International Airport	Seasonal	
Greece	Heraklion	Heraklion International Airport	Seasonal	
Greece	Kalamata	Kalamata International Airport	Terminated	
Greece	Kos	Kos International Airport	Seasonal	
Greece	Mykonos	Mykonos Airport	Terminated	
Greece	Mytilene	Mytilene International Airport	Seasonal	
Greece	Rhodes	Rhodes International Airport	Seasonal	
Greece	Samos	Samos International Airport	Seasonal	
Greece	Santorini	Santorini International Airport	Terminated	
Greece	Thessaloniki	Thessaloniki Airport	Terminated	
Greece	Zakynthos	Zakynthos International Airport	Seasonal	
Guinea	Conakry	Conakry International Airport		
Hungary	Budapest	Budapest Ferenc Liszt International Airport		
India	Mumbai	Chhatrapati Shivaji Maharaj International Airport	Terminated	
Israel	Tel Aviv	Ben Gurion Airport		
Italy	Bari	Bari Karol Wojtyła Airport	Terminated	
Italy	Bologna	Bologna Guglielmo Marconi Airport		
Italy	Brindisi	Brindisi Airport	Terminated	
Italy	Catania	Catania–Fontanarossa Airport	Seasonal	
Italy	Comiso	Comiso Airport	Terminated	
Italy	Florence	Florence Airport	Seasonal	
Italy	Milan	Linate Airport		
Italy	Milan	Milan Malpensa Airport		
Italy	Naples	Naples International Airport		
Italy	Olbia	Olbia Costa Smeralda Airport	Seasonal	
Italy	Palermo	Falcone Borsellino Airport	Terminated	
Italy	Rome	Rome Fiumicino Airport		
Italy	Turin	Turin Airport	Terminated	
Italy	Venice	Venice Marco Polo Airport		
Kenya	Nairobi	Jomo Kenyatta International Airport		
Latvia	Riga	Riga International Airport	Terminated	
Liberia	Monrovia	Roberts International Airport		
Lithuania	Vilnius	Vilnius Čiurlionis International Airport		
Malta	Valletta	Malta International Airport	Terminated	
Montenegro	Tivat	Tivat Airport	Terminated	
Morocco	Agadir	Agadir–Al Massira Airport	Terminated	
Morocco	Al Hoceima	Cherif Al Idrissi Airport	Terminated	
Morocco	Marrakesh	Marrakesh Menara Airport	Terminated	
Morocco	Nador	Nador International Airport	Seasonal	
Morocco	Rabat	Rabat–Salé Airport	Terminated	
Morocco	Tangier	Tangier Ibn Battouta Airport	Seasonal	
North Macedonia	Ohrid	Ohrid St. Paul the Apostle Airport	Terminated	
Norway	Evenes	Harstad/Narvik Airport	Seasonal	
Norway	Oslo	Oslo Airport, Gardermoen		
Poland	Kraków	Kraków John Paul II International Airport		
Poland	Warsaw	Warsaw Chopin Airport		
Portugal	Faro	Faro Airport		
Portugal	Funchal	Madeira Airport		
Portugal	Lisbon	Lisbon Airport		
Portugal	Porto	Porto Airport		
Russia	Moscow	Moscow Domodedovo Airport	Terminated	
Russia	Moscow	Sheremetyevo International Airport	Terminated	
Russia	Saint Petersburg	Pulkovo Airport	Terminated	
Rwanda	Kigali	Kigali International Airport		
Senegal	Dakar	Blaise Diagne International Airport		
Senegal	Dakar	Léopold Sédar Senghor International Airport	Terminated	
Sierra Leone	Freetown	Lungi International Airport		
Slovenia	Ljubljana	Ljubljana Jože Pučnik Airport		
Spain	Alicante	Alicante–Elche Miguel Hernández Airport		
Spain	Almería	Almería Airport	Terminated	
Spain	Barcelona	Josep Tarradellas Barcelona–El Prat Airport		
Spain	Bilbao	Bilbao Airport		
Spain	Fuerteventura	Fuerteventura Airport		
Spain	Girona	Girona–Costa Brava Airport	Terminated	
Spain	Ibiza	Ibiza Airport	Seasonal	
Spain	Jerez de la Frontera	Jerez Airport	Terminated	
Spain	Lanzarote	Lanzarote Airport		
Spain	Las Palmas	Gran Canaria Airport		
Spain	Madrid	Madrid–Barajas Airport		
Spain	Málaga	Málaga Airport		
Spain	Menorca	Menorca Airport	Terminated	
Spain	Palma de Mallorca	Palma de Mallorca Airport	Seasonal	
Spain	Reus	Reus Airport	Terminated	
Spain	Seville	Seville Airport	Terminated	
Spain	Tenerife	Tenerife South Airport		
Spain	Valencia	Valencia Airport		
Sweden	Gothenburg	Göteborg Landvetter Airport		
Sweden	Stockholm	Stockholm Arlanda Airport		
Sweden	Stockholm	Stockholm Bromma Airport	Terminated	
Switzerland; France; Germany	Basel; Mulhouse; Freiburg	EuroAirport Basel Mulhouse Freiburg	Terminated	
Switzerland	Geneva	Geneva Airport		
Switzerland	Zürich	Zurich Airport		
Tanzania	Kilimanjaro	Kilimanjaro Airport		
Togo	Lomé	Lomé–Tokoin International Airport		
Turkey	Antalya	Antalya Airport	Terminated	
Tunisia	Djerba	Djerba–Zarzis International Airport	Seasonal	
Tunisia	Enfidha	Enfidha–Hammamet International Airport	Terminated	
Tunisia	Monastir	Monastir Habib Bourguiba International Airport	Seasonal	
Uganda	Kampala	Entebbe International Airport		
Ukraine	Kyiv	Boryspil International Airport	Terminated	
United Kingdom	Belfast	Belfast City Airport	Terminated	
United Kingdom	Birmingham	Birmingham Airport	Terminated	
United Kingdom	Bristol	Bristol Airport	Terminated	
United Kingdom	Edinburgh	Edinburgh Airport		
United Kingdom	London	Heathrow Airport		
United Kingdom	Manchester	Manchester Airport		
United States	New York City	John F. Kennedy International Airport		
United States	Washington, D.C.	Dulles International Airport	Seasonal	
