= Korongo Airlines =

Airline of the Democratic Republic of the Congo

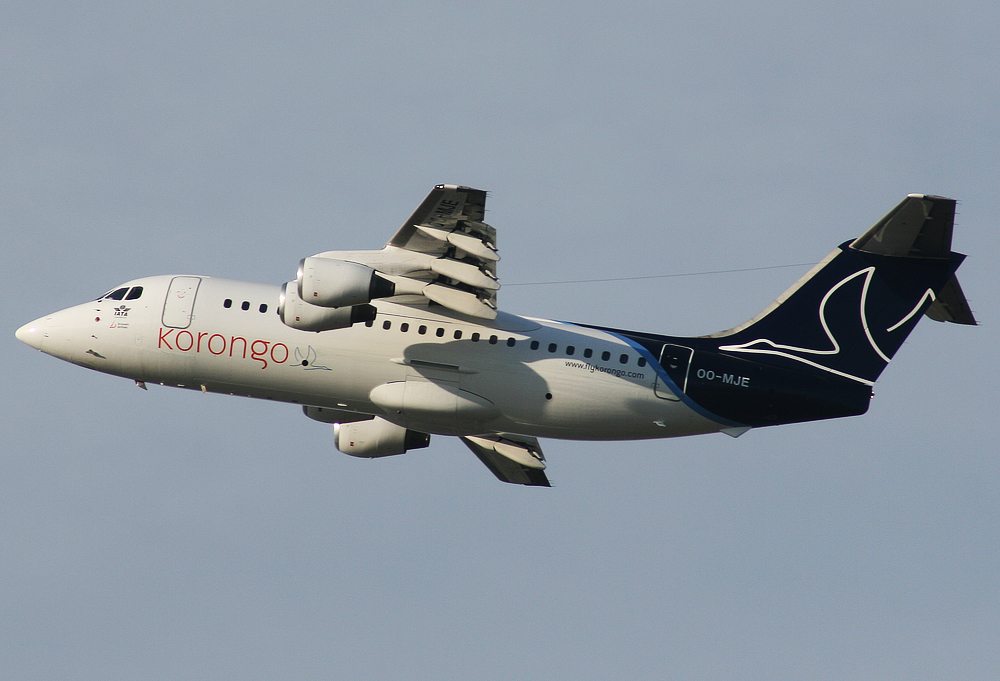
| IATA | ICAO | Call sign |
|---|---|---|
| ZC | KGO | CONGO STAR |
- Founded: 2009
- Commenced operations: 2012
- Ceased operations: 4 September 2015
- Operating bases: Lubumbashi International Airport
- Fleet size: 1
- Destinations: 4
- Headquarters: Lubumbashi, Democratic Republic of the Congo
- Key people: George Arthur Forrest, chairman
- Website: flykorongo.com

Korongo Airlines sprl (after the Swahili term for large migrating birds) was an airline from the Democratic Republic of the Congo (DR Congo), headquartered in Lubumbashi. It was founded on behalf of Brussels Airlines and other Belgian investors in 2009, and operated scheduled regional flights from its base at Lubumbashi International Airport.

On 4 September 2015, Korongo Airlines ceased all operations because it did not have enough reservations (despite a 70% load factor), and because of damage caused to the only airplane in the fleet a week earlier.

== History ==
=== airDC ===
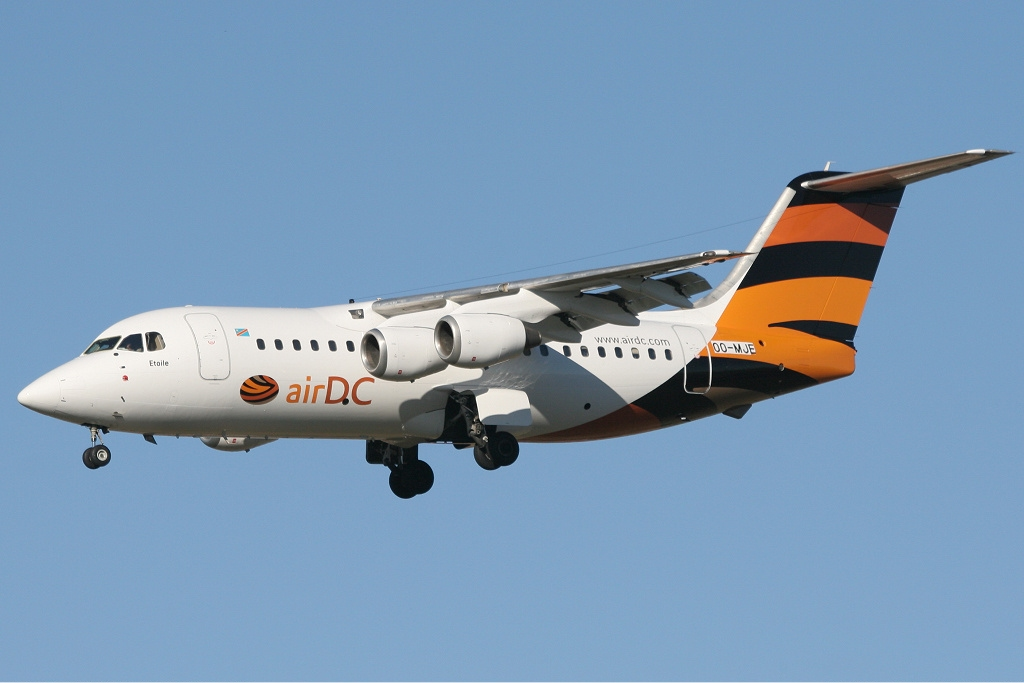
A Brussels Airlines BAe 146-200 in the colors of proposed airDC (2008)...

Brussels Airlines began trying to set up a regional airline in DR Congo in 2007. DR Congo used to be Belgian Congo and has strong business and political ties with Belgium. In that year, airDC was founded as a joint venture with Hewa Bora Airways, and the launch of commercial regional flights from Kinshasa-N'djili Airport using a fleet of BAe 146-200s handed over by Brussels Airlines was planned for early 2008. Concerns about the success of the project were voiced in 2008 when the disaster of Hewa Bora Airways Flight 122 revealed serious aviation safety flaws in the Democratic Republic of Congo. As a consequence, Hewa Bora was banned from operating within the European Union (any air carriers from the DR Congo had already been included in the EU blacklist since 2006 due to a lack or regulatory oversight in the country, but there had been an exception for Hewa Bora's Brussels service). The airDC project was postponed indefinitely and eventually abandoned.

=== Founding of Korongo Airlines ===
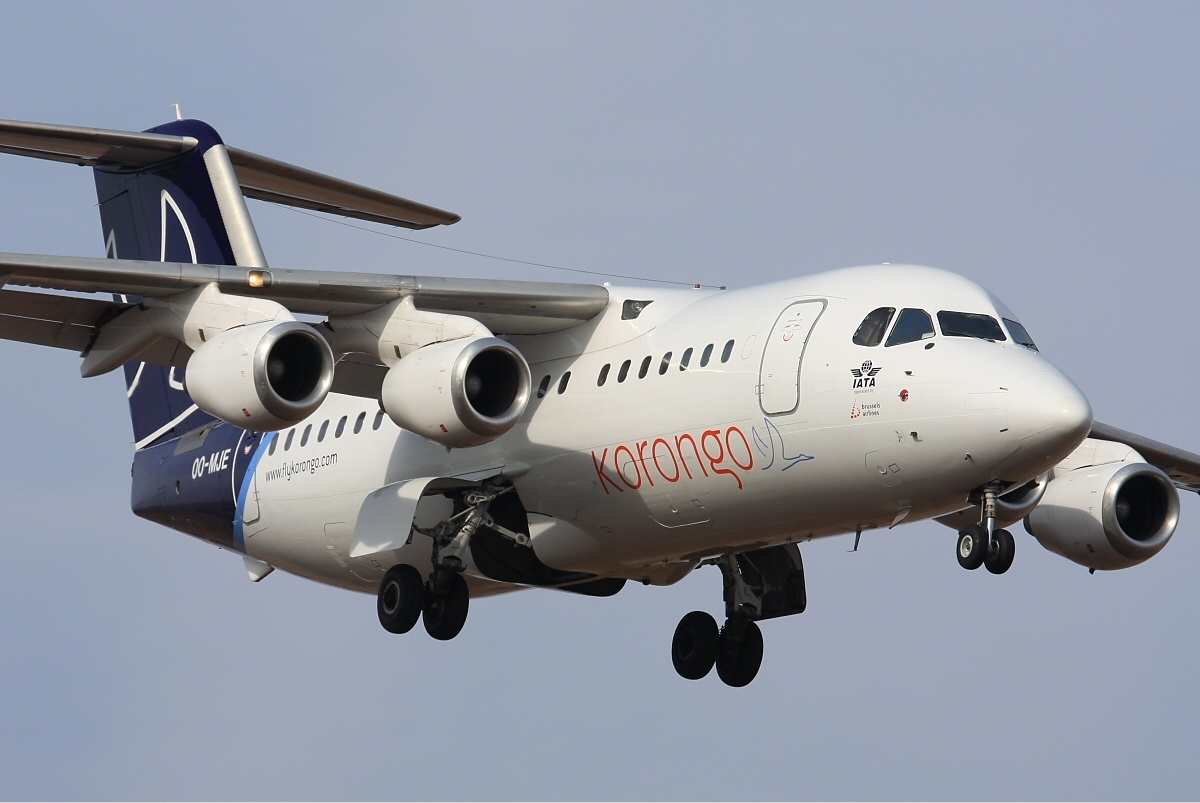
... and the same aircraft featuring the Korongo Airlines livery (2011).

A new attempt by Brussels Airlines to install a regional feeder service for its Brussels-Kinshasa flights was launched in 2009. In December of that year, Korongo Airlines was founded, with 70 percent of its shares being owned by Airbel, a Belgian holding company, which in turn is owned by Brussels Airlines (49.5 percent) and Forrest Group (50.5 percent). The remaining 30 percent in Korongo Airlines are owned by local Congolese investors. George Arthur Forrest, Belgian entrepreneur and owner of Forrest Groups, serves as the airline's chairman.

In contrast to airDC, Korongo was headquartered in Lubumbashi and used Lubumbashi International Airport as its base. The launch of revenue flights had been planned for the second quarter of 2010, but had to be postponed to the second quarter of 2011 and yet again to early 2012. The project met severe resistance from the local Congolese authorities, which led to a delayed approval process. On 20 April 2011, Korongo Airlines was put on the EU airline blacklist (as was any other air carrier with maintenance work done in the DR Congo).

=== Launch of flight operations ===
Finally, on 12 January 2012, Korongo Airlines was issued its airline licence. On 23 February, it was given approval for commercial revenue flights, which were launched on 16 April of that year on the Lubumbashi-Kinshasa route, with further domestic destinations as well scheduled flights to Johannesburg being commenced over the following months.

=== Cessation of activities ===
On 4 September 2015, Korongo's investors decided to discontinue the flight operations and to dissolve the company. The competition from the newly established Congolese competitor Congo Airways, and an incident two weeks prior to the declaration, involving the only airplane in the fleet, Boeing 737-300 OO-LTM, were referred to as cause for the liquidation of the company.

== Destinations ==
As of May 2013, Korongo Airlines operated scheduled flights to the following destinations:

Democratic Republic of the Congo

- Kinshasa - N'djili Airport
- Lubumbashi - Lubumbashi International Airport base
- Mbuji Mayi - Mbuji Mayi Airport

South Africa

- Johannesburg - OR Tambo International Airport

== Fleet ==
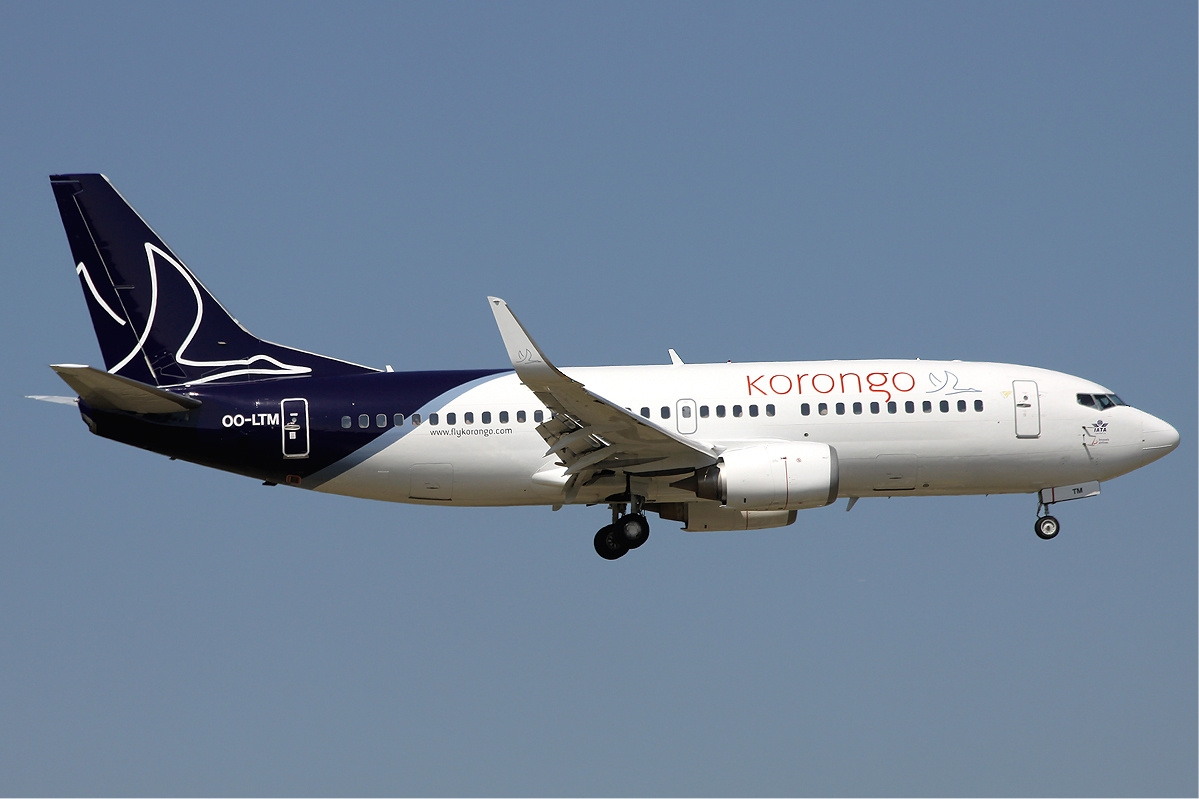
Korongo Airlines Boeing 737-300

The Korongo fleet consisted of the following aircraft as of June 2013:

Korongo fleet
| Aircraft | In service | Orders | Passengers | | | Remarks |
| Aircraft | In service | Orders | C | Y | Total | Remarks |
|---|---|---|---|---|---|---|
| Boeing 737-300 | 1 | — | 12 | 114 | 126 | Leased from Brussels Airlines |
| Total | 1 | — | | | | |

== Accidents and incidents ==
- On August 19, 2015, a Brussels Airlines Boeing 737, operating for Korongo Airlines, sustained damage to its horizontal stabilizer upon landing at Mbuji Mayi Airport due to bad pavement conditions

== See also ==
- Transport in the Democratic Republic of the Congo
