= Brussels Airlines =

National airline of Belgium

Brussels Airlines S.A.

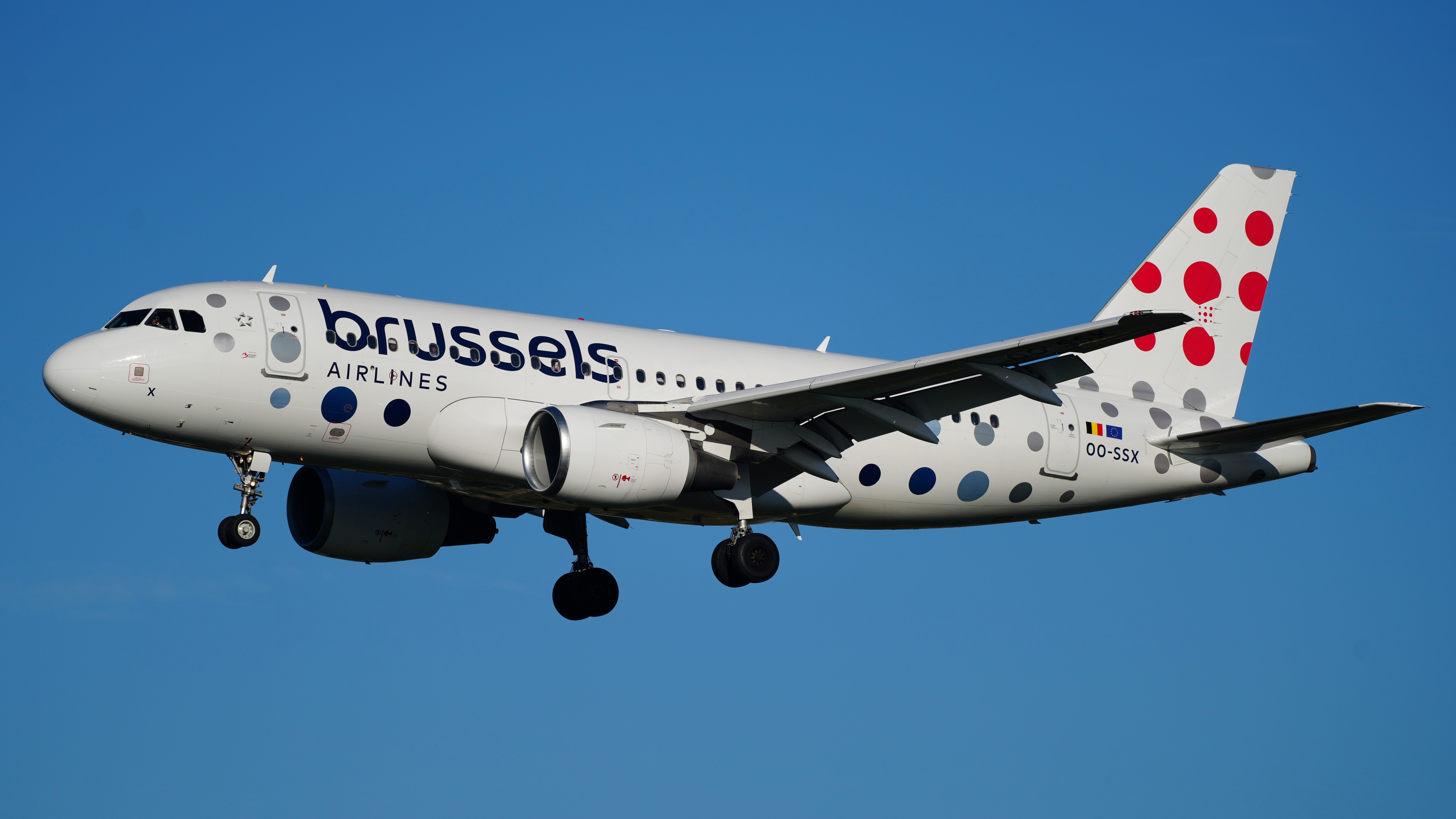
- A Brussels Airlines Airbus A319-100
IATA	ICAO	Call sign
SN	BEL	BEE-LINE
- Founded: 7 November 2006; 20 years ago (amalgamation)
- Commenced operations: 25 March 2007; 19 years ago
- Hubs: Brussels Airport
- Frequent-flyer program: Miles & More
- Alliance: Star Alliance
- Fleet size: 48
- Destinations: 93
- Parent company: Lufthansa Group
- Headquarters: Brussels Airport, Belgium
- Key people: Lorenza Maggio (CEO)
- Employees: 4,000
- Website: www.brusselsairlines.com

Brussels Airlines is the flag carrier and largest airline of Belgium, based and headquartered at Brussels Airport. It operates to over 100 destinations in Europe, West Asia, North America and Africa and also offers charter services, maintenance and crew training. It is a member of the Star Alliance as well as the International Air Transport Association. The airline's IATA code SN is inherited from its predecessors, Sabena and SN Brussels Airlines. Brussels Airlines is part of the Lufthansa Group. The company slogan is ′You’re in good company′.

== History ==
=== Early years (2005–2010) ===
The first logo and trademark of Brussels Airlines

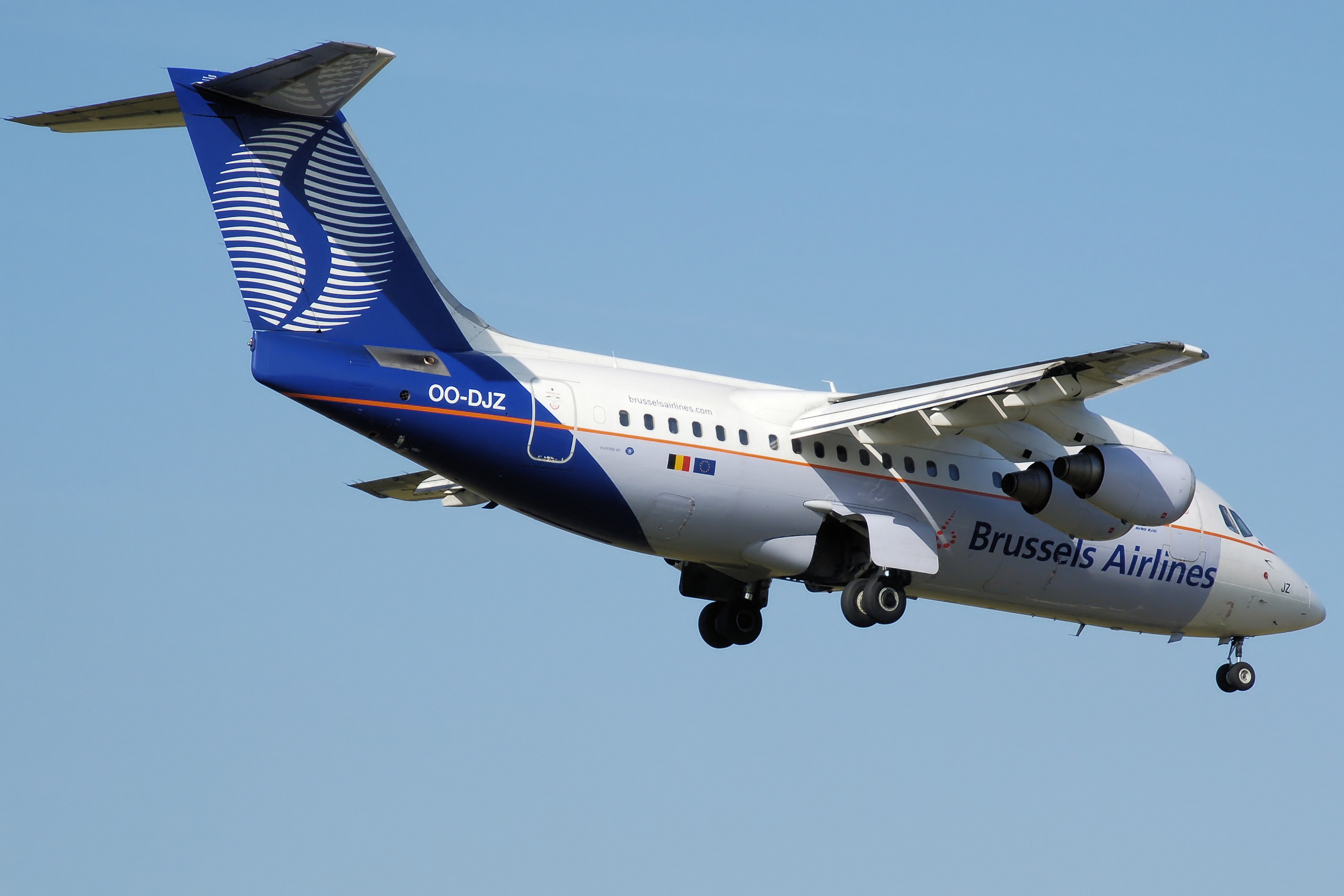
A Avro RJ85 in an interim livery

Brussels Airlines was created following the merger of Virgin Express and SN Brussels Airlines (SNBA, the name adopted by Delta Air Transport on February 15, 2002). This company was created after the bankruptcy of Belgium's previous national carrier, Sabena. On 12 April 2005, SN Airholding, the company behind SNBA, signed an agreement with Richard Branson, giving it control over Virgin Express. On 31 March 2006, SNBA and Virgin Express announced their merger into a single company. On 7 November 2006, the new name, Brussels Airlines, was announced at a press conference at Brussels Airport. Brussels Airlines began operations on 25 March 2007. Sometime during this period, the airline was forced to change its 13-dot logo to a 14-dot logo owing to superstitious passengers complaining about the logo.

On 15 September 2008, it was announced that Lufthansa would acquire a 45% stake in Brussels Airlines with an option to acquire the remaining 55% from 2011. As a part of this deal, Brussels Airlines would join Star Alliance. From 26 October 2008, the ICAO code was changed from DAT to BEL.

On 15 June 2009, Brussels Airlines announced that the European Commission had granted approval for Lufthansa to take a minority share in Brussels Airlines. As a result of this clearance by the EU, Brussels Airlines was able to join Star Alliance. Lufthansa purchased 45% of the company in 2009, and acquired the remainder in January 2017.

Since 25 October 2009, Brussels Airlines has been a member of Lufthansa's frequent flyer programme Miles & More. On 9 December 2009, Brussels Airlines became the 26th Star Alliance member during a ceremony at Brussels Town Hall.

On 15 December 2009, Brussels Airlines announced it was working on a new regional airline in the Democratic Republic of the Congo. The name of the airline was Korongo. The main base of the airline was at Lubumbashi in Congo. The airline was launched in April 2012 and shut down in 2015. Brussels Airlines cancelled the airDC project, due to disagreements with Hewa Bora.

=== Development since 2010 ===
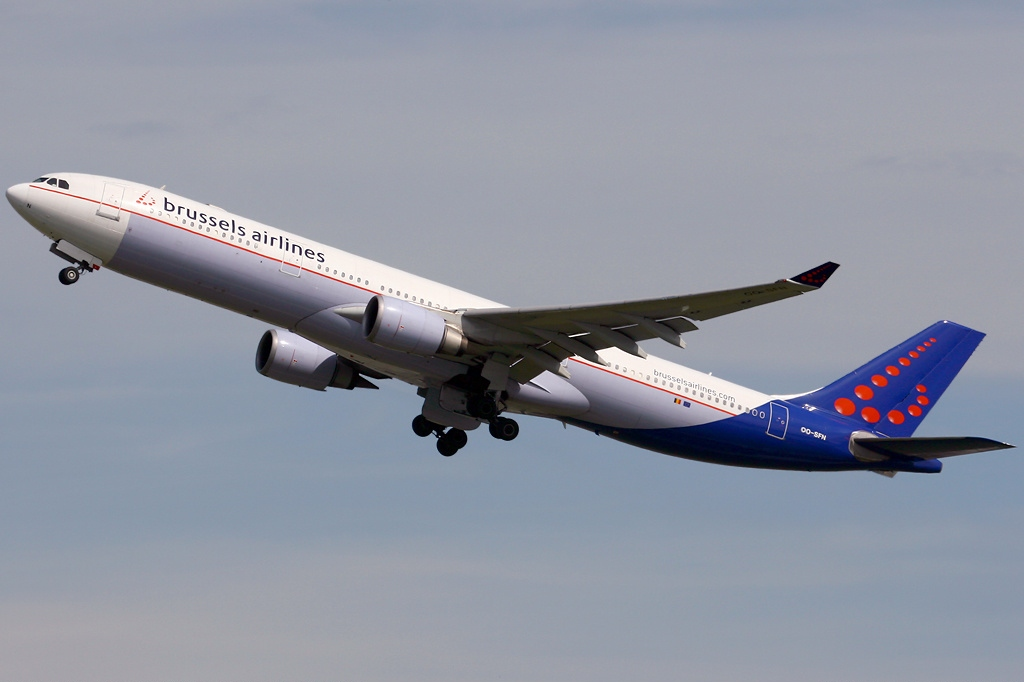
An Airbus A330-300 in an interim livery

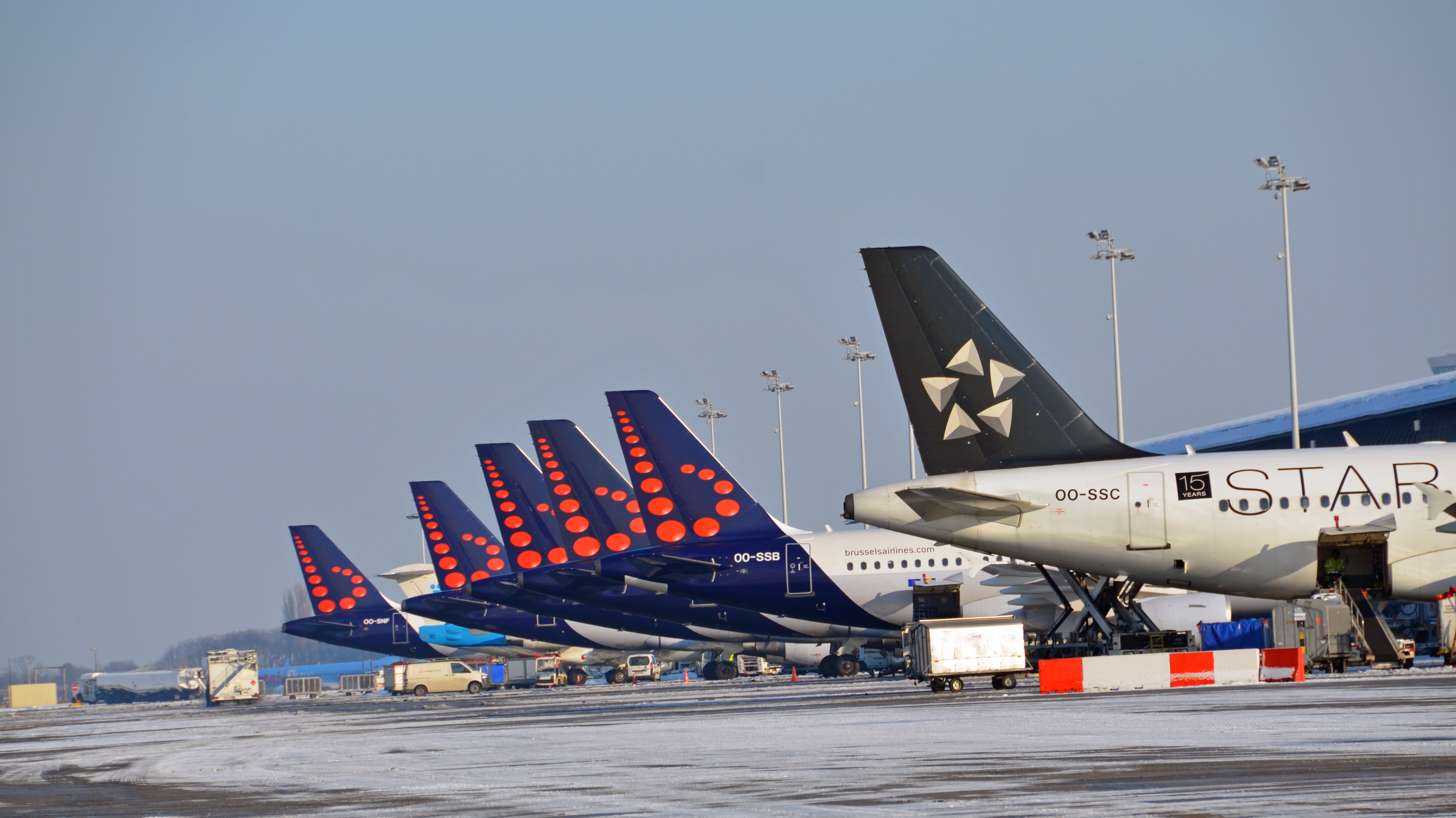
Brussels Airlines aircraft lined up at Brussels Airport, the main operational base

On 5 July 2010, a fifth Airbus A330-300 entered into service. Brussels Airlines increased its frequency to Abidjan (up to 6 weekly) and added Accra, Cotonou, Ouagadougou, and Lomé as new destinations. On 11 August 2010, Brussels Airlines and tour operator Club Med announced a new cooperation. As of April 2011, Brussels Airlines will transport 80% of all Club Med passengers out of Brussels, both on existing regular Brussels Airlines routes as on new charter routes operated by Brussels Airlines. Brussels Airlines also announced that it will lease 2 Airbus A320 aircraft from January 2011.

On 26 August 2010, the company announced its new maintenance project. The contract with Sabena Technics for the A330 and Boeing 737 ended on 1 January 2011 and Brussels Airlines will then do the plane maintenance. To do this, the move from Building 117 to Hangar 41 was necessary. Also, 73 people from Sabena Technics joined the Brussels Airlines maintenance staff.

On 1 June 2012, Brussels Airlines inaugurated the route to New York JFK, operating daily with an Airbus A330-300 fitted with the new interior. This is the first Belgian airline in 10 years to fly to New York, after Sabena and Delsey Airlines collapsed. Since 18 June 2013, they also fly 5 times a week to Washington Dulles. Since April 2016, Toronto Pearson has been added to the North American network. It has been announced that as of March 2017, a new service to Mumbai will commence with 5 flights per week operated by a new Airbus A330-200 arriving early 2017.

On 30 January 2014, Brussels Airlines added 9 seasonal destinations and returned to the Polish market after some years of absence. It also confirmed the permanent exit of its Avro RJ100 fleet by 2016.

In April 2015, Brussels Airlines was praised by the White House for continuing its normal flying operation to Western African countries during the Ebola outbreak, allowing essential aid to be delivered. All other airline companies, except Royal Air Maroc, suspended their flights to Sierra Leone, Liberia and Guinea.

On 22 March 2016, members of the terrorist organization ISIL detonated two bombs in Brussels Airport, closing the airport until Sunday, 27 March 2016. Brussels Airlines shifted some long haul flights to Zurich and Frankfurt. They began Airbus A319/Avro RJ100 shuttle service between Liege/Antwerp and Zurich/Frankfurt, as well as providing contracted bus service from Brussels to Antwerp and Liege from where it served European destinations.

On 28 September 2016, the supervisory board of Lufthansa announced that the airline would exercise the option to acquire the remaining 55% of Brussels Airlines' parent company SN Airholding. The modalities would be defined before the end of the year to conclude the transaction at the beginning of 2017.

In March 2017, Thomas Cook announced its intention to sell its Belgian flight operations, Thomas Cook Airlines Belgium, which was shut down by November 2017 with two aircraft and all traffic rights being integrated into Brussels Airlines. Brussels Airlines took over the 160 Thomas Cook Airlines crew members.

In February 2018, CEO Bernard Gustin and financial director Jan De Raeymaeker resigned after a meeting with the Lufthansa board over the airline's future. Gustin was replaced by Christina Foerster on 1 April 2018. On 1 May 2018, Dieter Vranckx joined the company as CFO.

In December 2019, it was announced that Dieter Vranckx would replace Christina Foerster as CEO of Brussels Airlines effective 1 January 2020.

During the COVID-19 pandemic in Belgium, Brussels Airlines suspended all flights from 21 March through 19 April. Additionally, Brussels Airlines cancelled its wet-lease contract with CityJet, leading to the termination of eight European destinations in the wake of the pandemic. At the end of June 2020, Brussels Airlines also announced that they were cancelling several of flights scheduled for operation in September and October 2020. Like many airlines Brussels Airlines did not refund affected customers in line with Flight Compensation Regulation timelines during the COVID pandemic and encouraged passengers to take credit vouchers or flights on alternative dates instead.

In November 2021, Brussels Airlines announced a revision of their corporate design including a new logo.

In 2022 the airline commissioned Belgian band Hooverphonic to write a song using the airline's standard safety instructions and film a music video of it to show passengers prior to takeoff on long-haul flights. The band debuted them at a 1 August surprise performance at a Brussels Airport gate where the airline's newest Airbus was making its first flight. "Safety is our priority but that is not a synonym for bland", said the airline's marketing director, Michel Moriaux. "I really thought it would be impossible. But at the same time, I love that kind of challenge and we went for it", said Hooverphonic's Alex Callier. The video, whose slightly surreal imagery includes some homages to Belgian surrealist painter René Magritte, will be shown on flights through the end of 2025.

== Corporate affairs ==
=== Head office ===
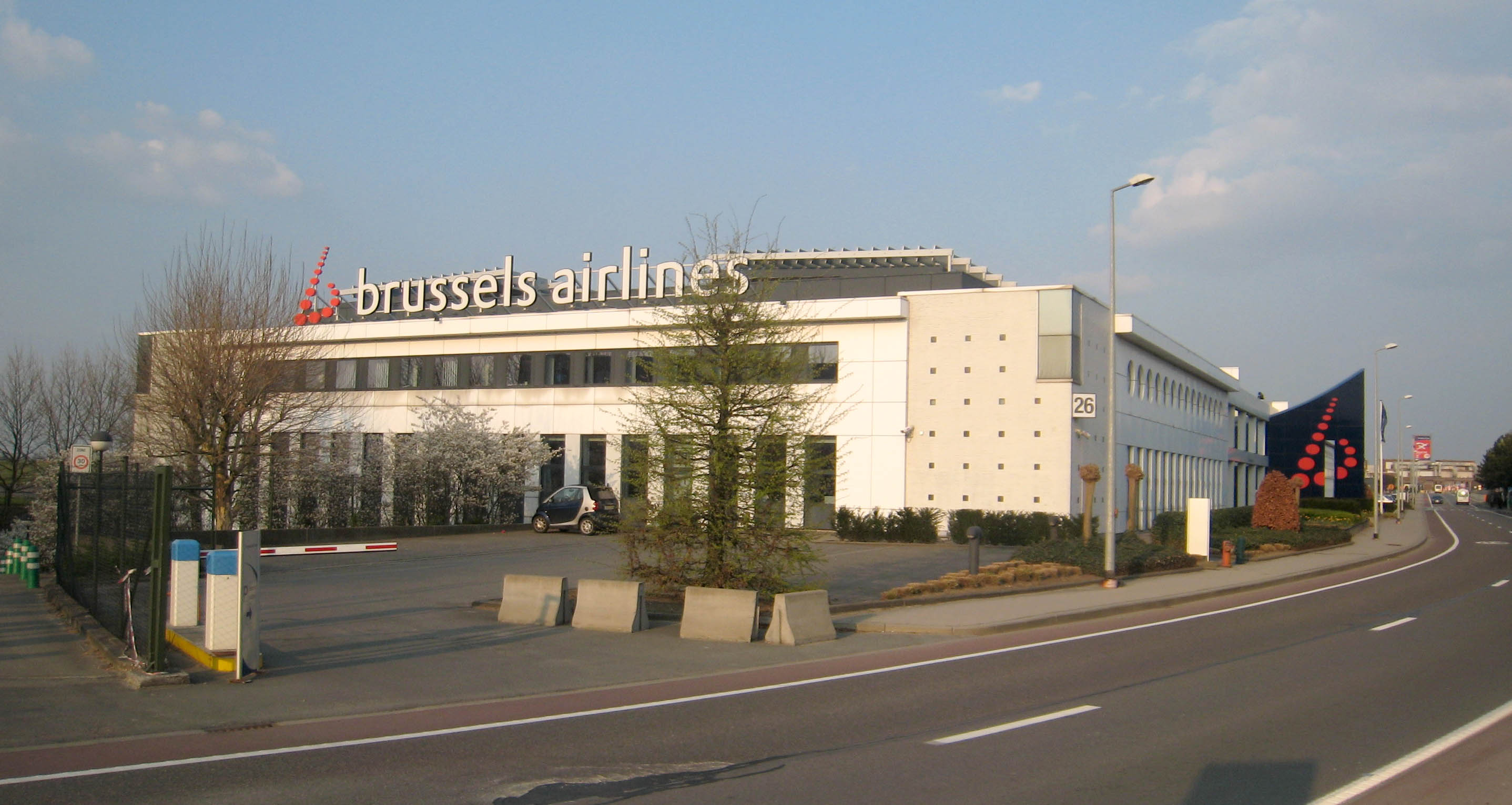
b.house, Brussels Airlines' headquarters, located at Brussels Airport

The company is headquartered in the b.house (Building 26) in the General Aviation Zone on the grounds of Brussels Airport and in Diegem, Machelen, Flemish Brabant.

=== Ownership and structure ===
Brussels Airlines is the operating name of Brussels Airlines SA/NV (previously Delta Air Transport SA/NV) which has its registered office in Elsene-Ixelles, Brussels.

Brussels Airlines is almost 100% owned by SN Airholding SA/NV (1,811,308 shares out of 1,811,309) a Belgian holding company. Lufthansa owns 100% of SN Airholding SA/NV, having taken control of the remaining shares it did not own effective January 2017.

Dieter Vranckx has been the CEO since 1 January 2020. The executive committee consists of Dieter Vranckx (CEO & CCO) and Edi Wolfensberger (COO). Dieter Vranckx was previously the CFO of the company.

=== Business trends ===
Limited information on Brussels Airlines appears to be published by the company or the Lufthansa Group. However, accounts for all Belgian companies must be filed with the National Bank of Belgium, and key trends over recent years are shown below (for years ending 31 December):

	Revenue (€m)	Net profit (€m)	Number of employees (Note: on average)	Number of passengers (Note: scheduled) (m)	Passenger load factor (%)	Number of aircraft	Notes/ references
2009	849	−40		4.6			
2010	930	5		4.8			
2011	1,036	−80	2,418	5.6	66.5		
2012	1,113	−61	2,479	5.7	68.7		
2013	1,138	−22	2,393	5.8	69.2		
2014	1,224	−4.2	2,395	6.6	72.0		
2015	1,330	41.3	2,427	7.5	74.4	47	
2016	1,271	15.0	2,480	7.7	74.9	49	
2017	1,326	3.6	3,400	9.1	78.5	50	
2018	1,500	12.8	3,512	10.0	81.0	53	
2019	1,555	−40.6	3,830	10.2	81.5	52	
2020	414	−332 (Note: from 2020 onwards: Operating profit "EBIT")	3,483	2.3	68.3	45	(Note: 2020: Activities and income in fiscal 2020 were severely reduced by the impact of the coronavirus pandemic)
2021	560	−189	3,035	3.4	67.2	41	
2022	1,217	−75	3,200	6.8	78.0	40	
2023	1,537	53	3,366	8.3	82.5	44	
2024	1,544	84	3,573	8.3	82.7	46	
2025	1,647	39	3,687	9.1	81.6	46	

== Destinations ==
=== Alliances ===
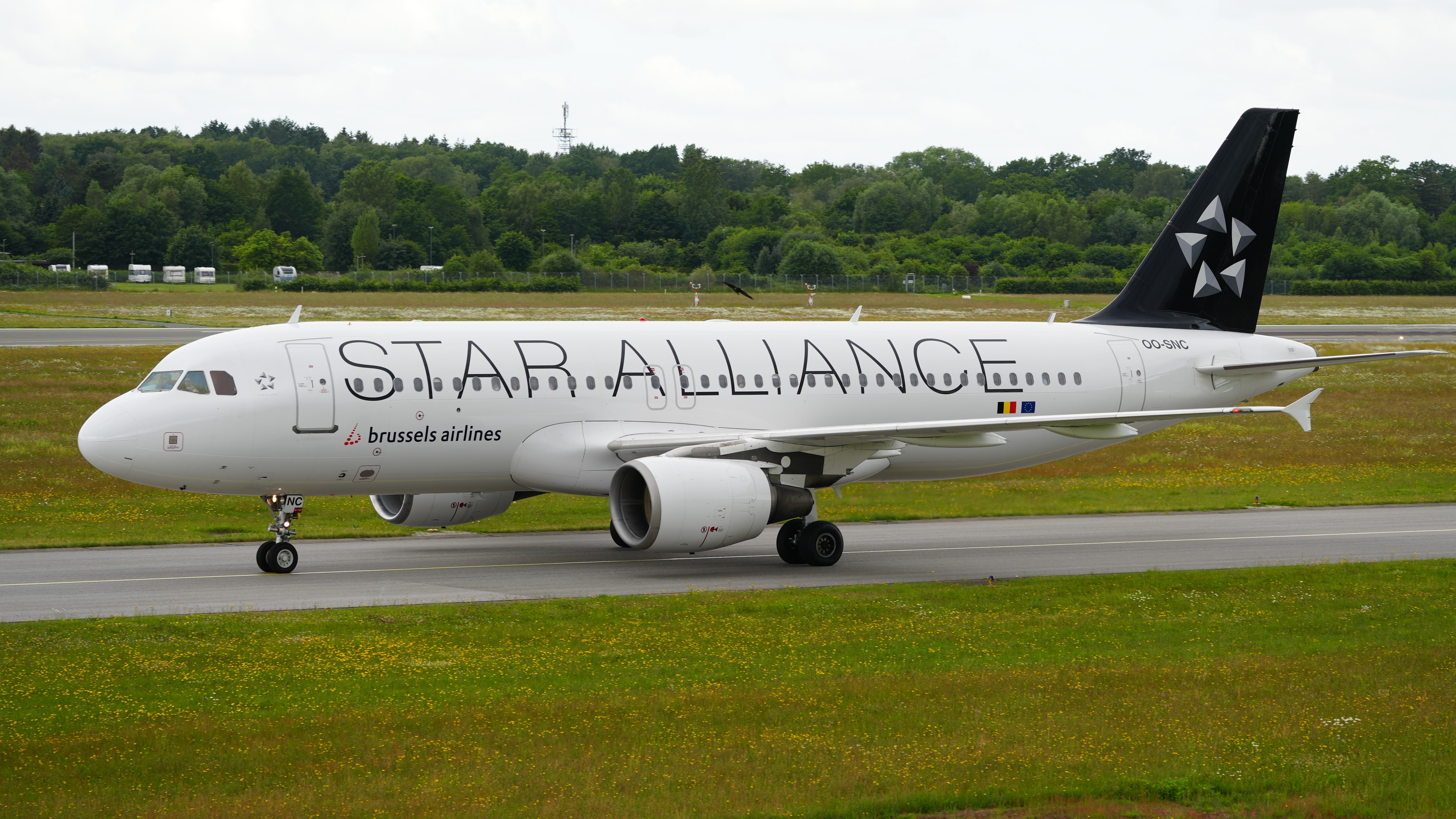
Airbus A320-200 in Star Alliance livery

Brussels Airlines is a member of Star Alliance.

=== Codeshare agreements ===
Brussels Airlines codeshares with the following airlines:

- Aegean Airlines
- AirBaltic
- Air Canada
- All Nippon Airways
- Austrian Airlines
- Cathay Pacific
- Croatia Airlines
- Discover Airlines
- Egyptair
- Etihad Airways
- Eurowings
- Hainan Airlines
- ITA Airways
- KM Malta Airlines
- Lufthansa
- Singapore Airlines
- SunExpress
- Swiss International Air Lines
- TAAG Angola Airlines
- TAP Air Portugal
- Thai Airways International
- United Airlines

=== Interline agreements ===
In October 2019, Brussels Airlines and Africa World Airlines announced an interline agreement to better connect passengers traveling through their respective hubs in Accra and Brussels.

Brussels Airlines interlines with the following airlines:

- Africa World Airlines
- Scoot

== Fleet ==
=== Current fleet ===
As of 30 July 2026, Brussels Airlines operates an all-Airbus fleet composed of the following aircraft:

Aircraft	In service	Orders	Passengers				Notes
Aircraft	In service	Orders	B	E+	E	Total	Notes
Airbus A319-100	13	—	—	—	141	141	Older aircraft to be replaced by Airbus A320neo.
Airbus A320-200	16	—	—	—	180	180	
Airbus A320neo	8	5	—	—	180	180	Replacing older Airbus A319-100.
Airbus A330-300	11	—	30	21	242	293	
Total	48	5					

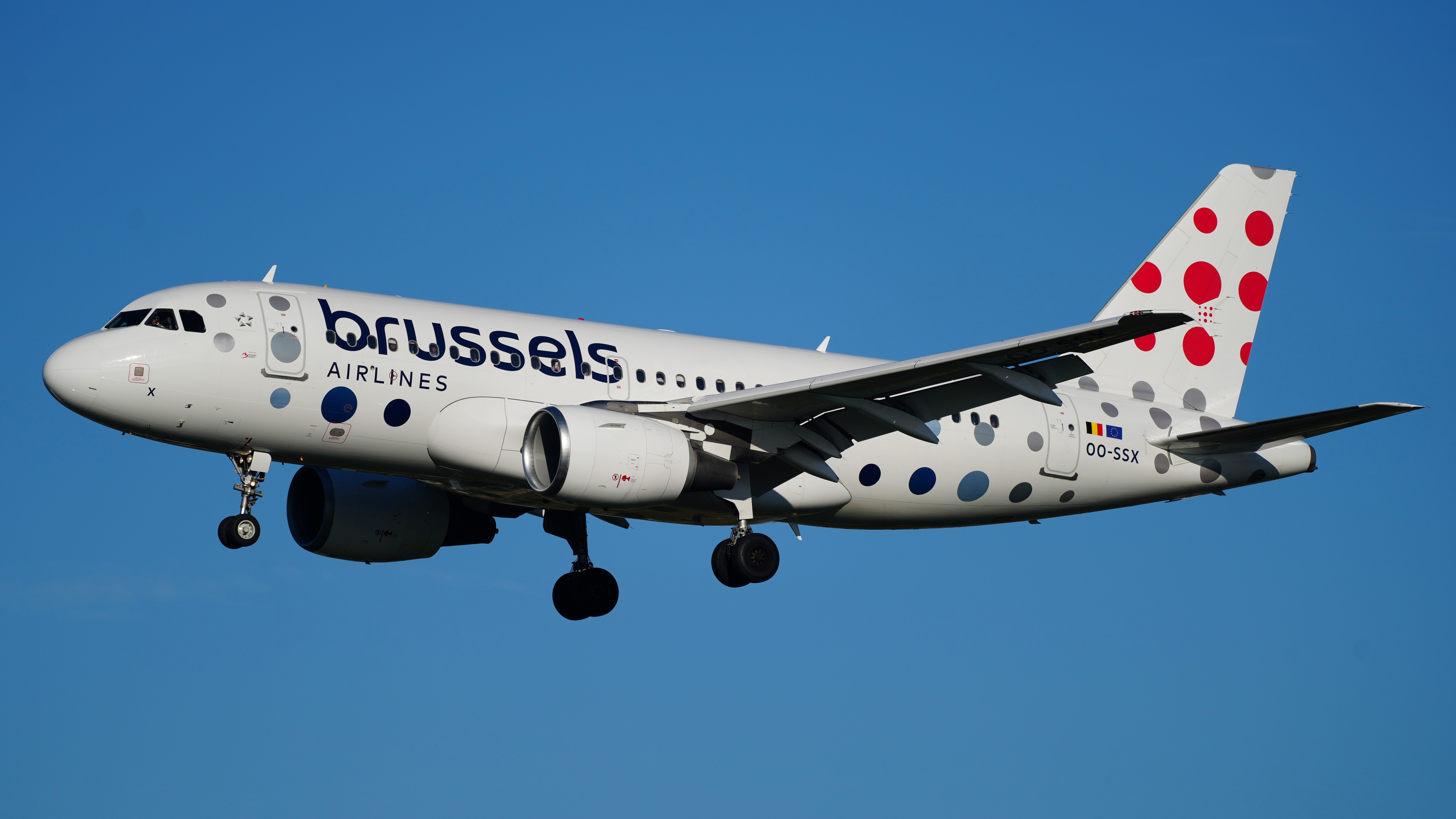
Airbus A319-100

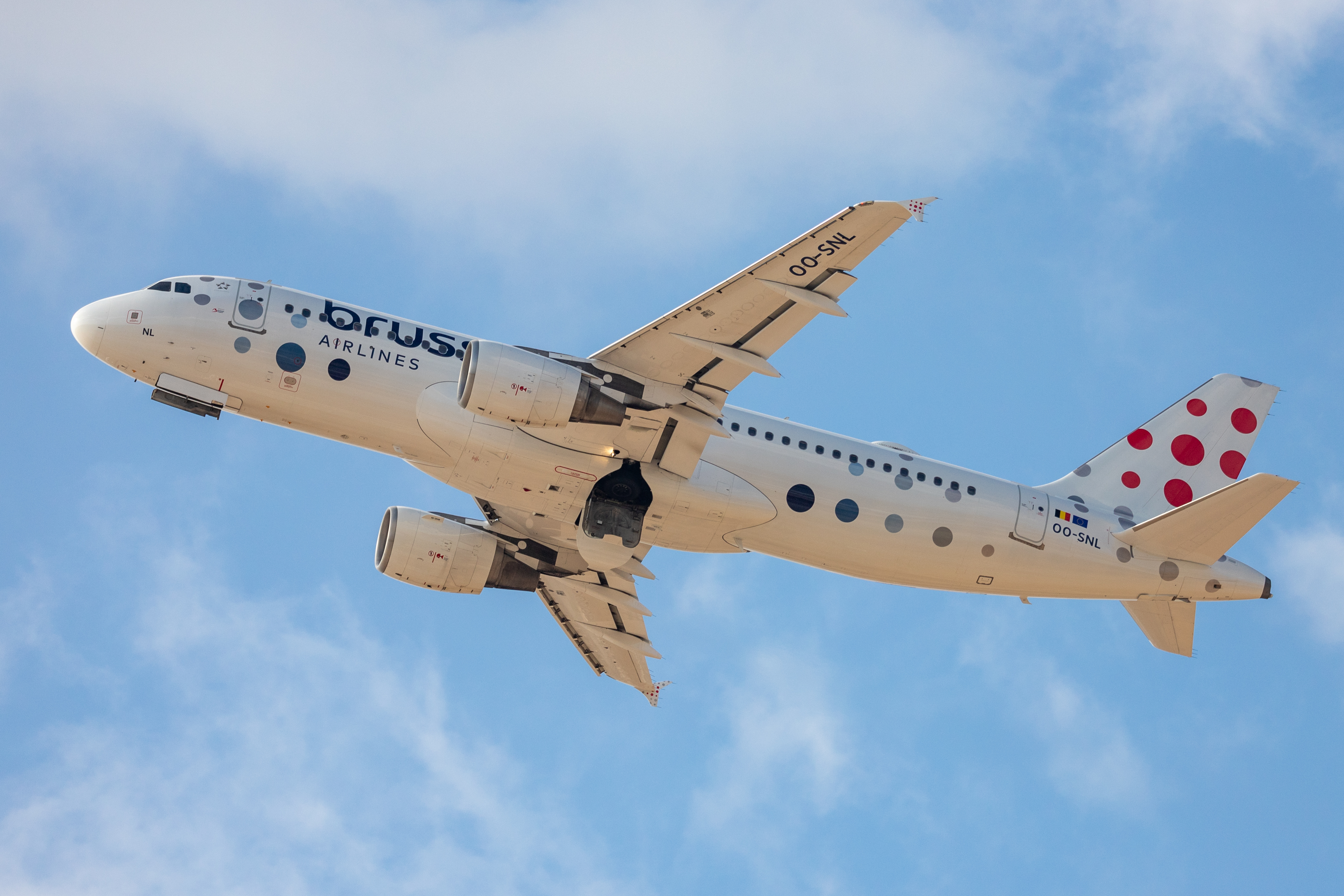
Airbus A320-200

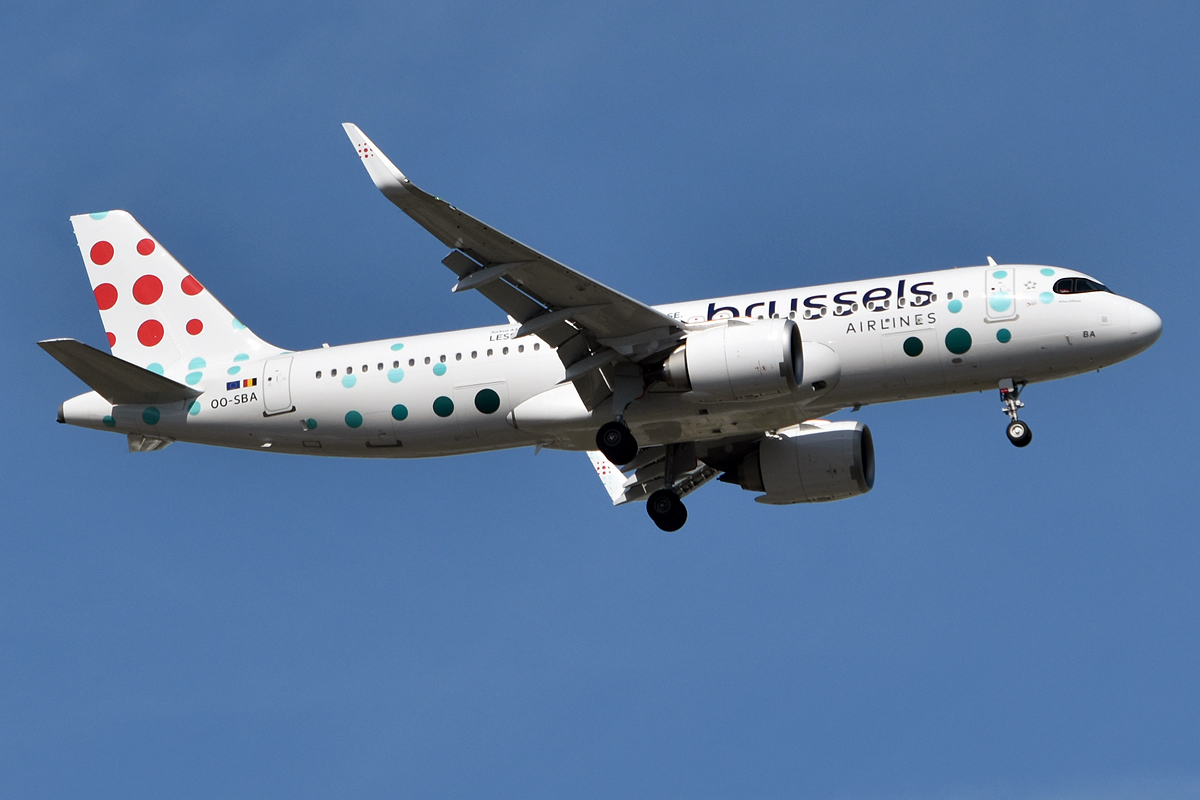
Airbus A320neo

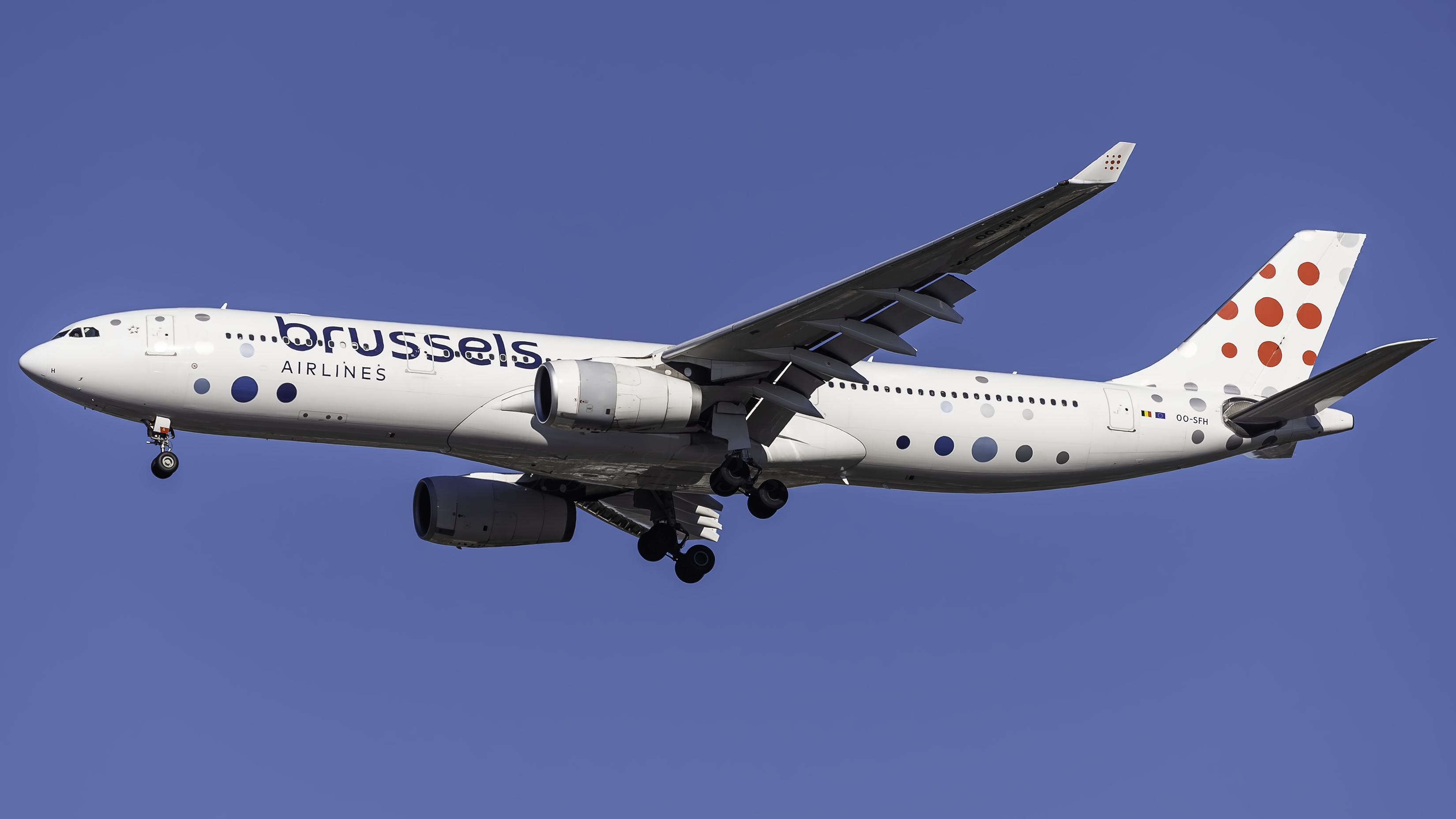
Airbus A330-300

=== Fleet history ===
Brussels Airlines formerly operated these types of aircraft (excluding wet-leased aircraft):

- Airbus A330-200
- Airbus A340-300 (operated on behalf of Eurowings)
- Avro RJ85
- Avro RJ100
- Boeing 737-300
- Boeing 737-400
- British Aerospace 146

=== Fleet development ===
Brussels Airlines previously operated six British Aerospace 146s which were withdrawn in 2008.

During 2010, two Airbus A319-100s joined Brussels Airlines' fleet. The first Airbus A320-200 joined the fleet in February 2011 and made its first commercial flight on 23 April 2011. With improving financial performance, rising cash reserves and a desire to reduce costs more rapidly, Brussels Airlines accelerated its fleet replacement plan by ordering 12 aircraft in August 2011. Six A319s, four A320s and two A330-200s were added to the fleet. This has completed the exit of Boeing aircraft from the fleet and accelerated the replacement of the Avro RJ85. In 2012, they began wet-leasing Bombardier Dash 8 aircraft from Flybe and Tyrolean Airways.

Starting 2016, Brussels Airlines began phasing out its Avro RJ100s and replaced them with the Airbus A320 family and wet-leased Sukhoi Superjets. This was completed by the end of 2017. However, Brussels Airlines announced in July 2018 it would terminate the Superjet wet-lease contracts earlier than planned. This is due to the longer downtimes of the aircraft in case of repairs compared to more common and less new types. The Superjets have been phased out since January 2019.

In mid-2021, Brussels Airlines announced that it will take delivery of three Airbus A320neo aircraft in 2023 to replace ageing A319-100s and aim to lower CO_{2} emissions amongst its fleet.

Brussels Airlines will put 3 more Airbus A320neo aircraft into service by the summer of 2026. Those modern aircraft will replace 2 older A319-100s.

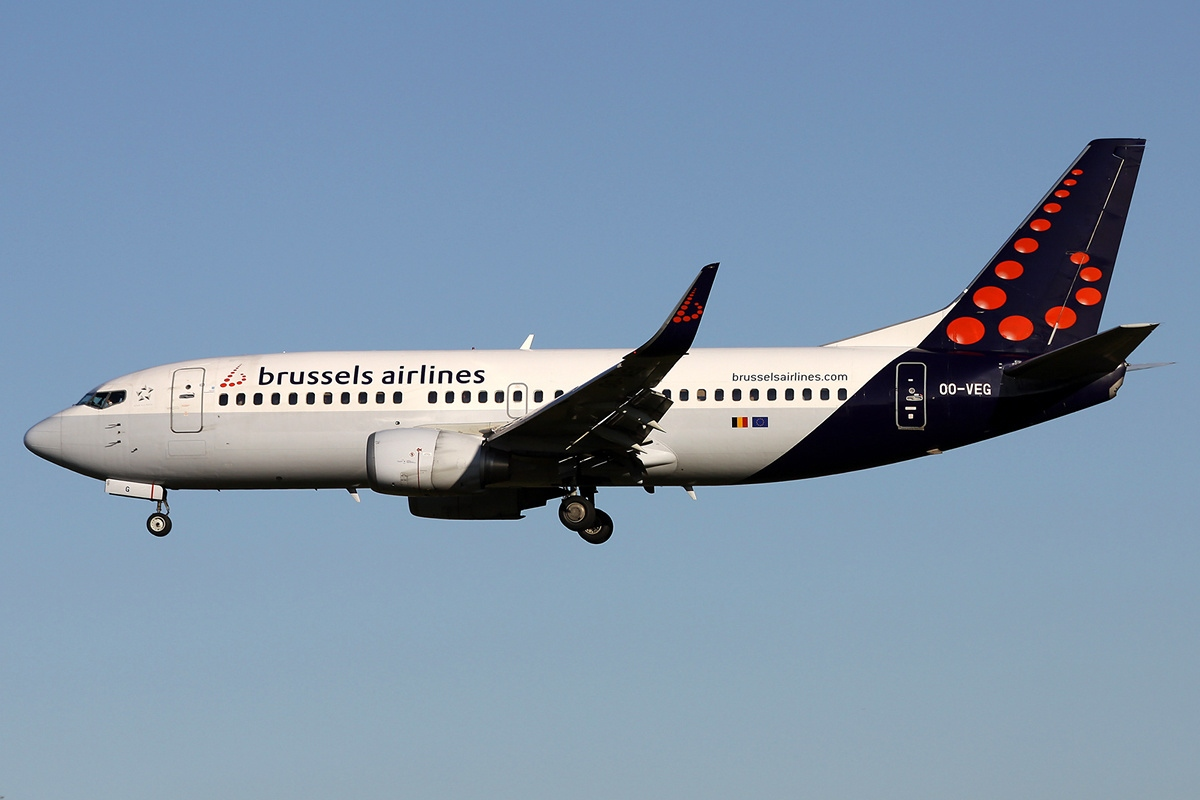
Boeing 737-300

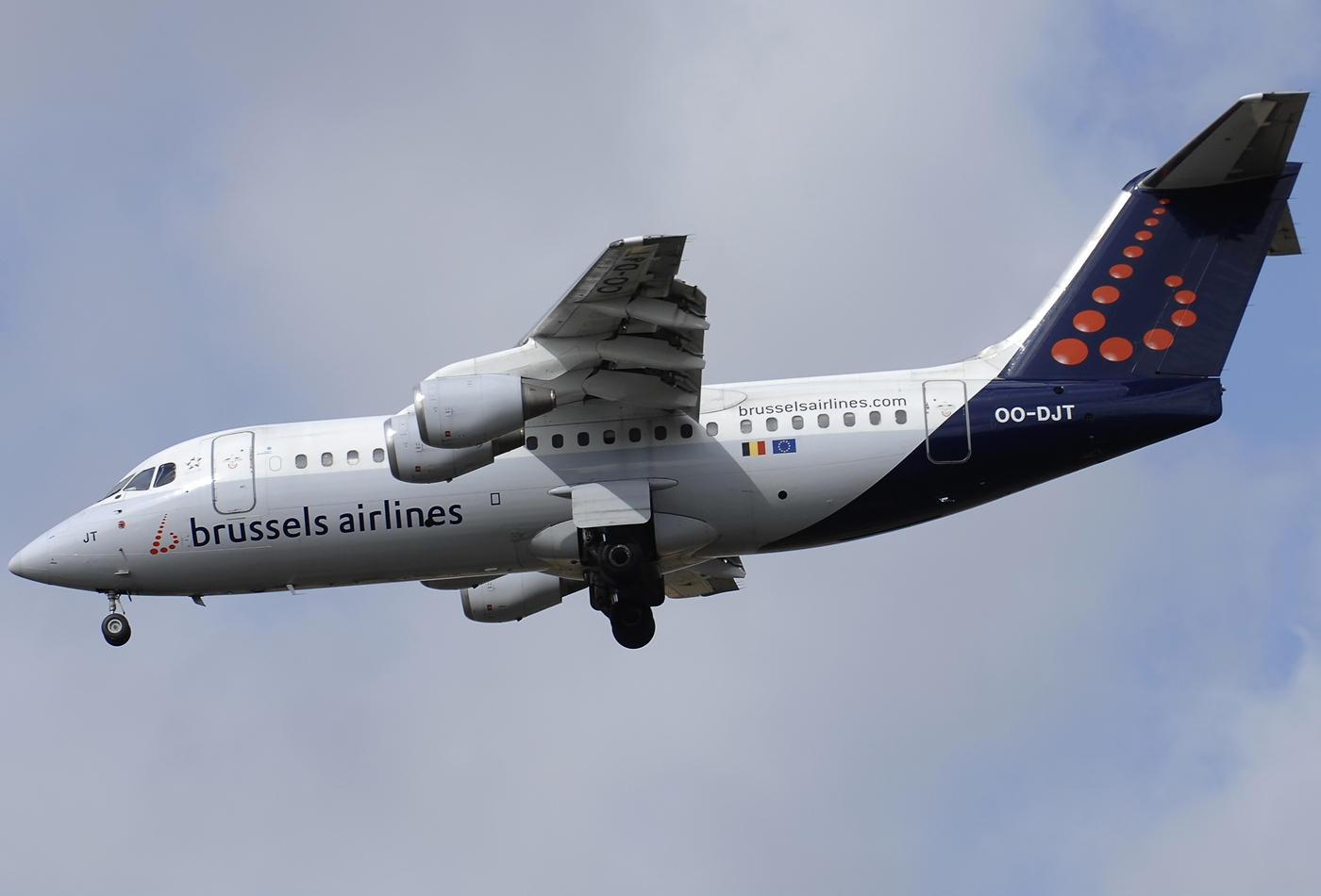
Avro RJ85

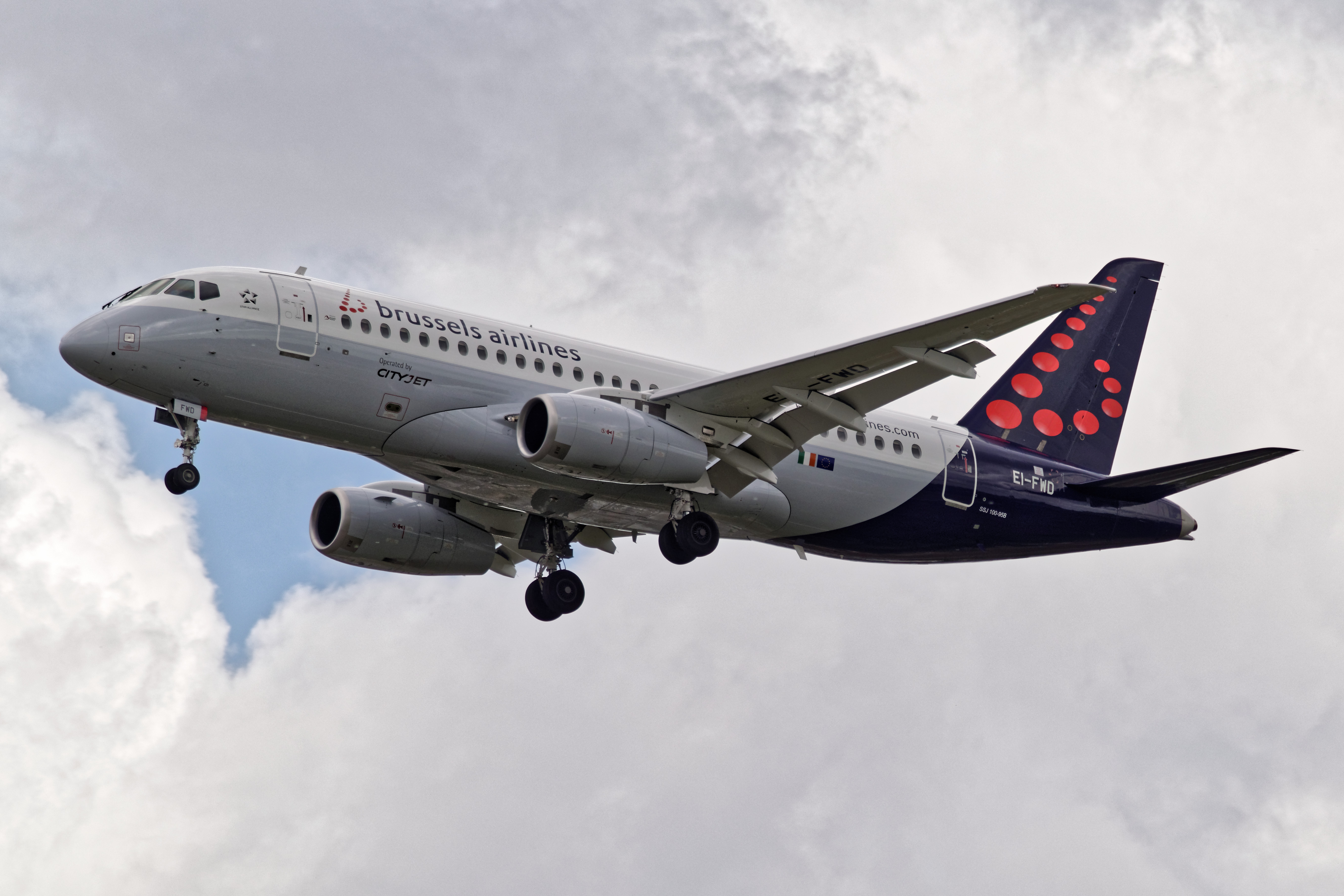
Sukhoi Superjet 100 leased from CityJet

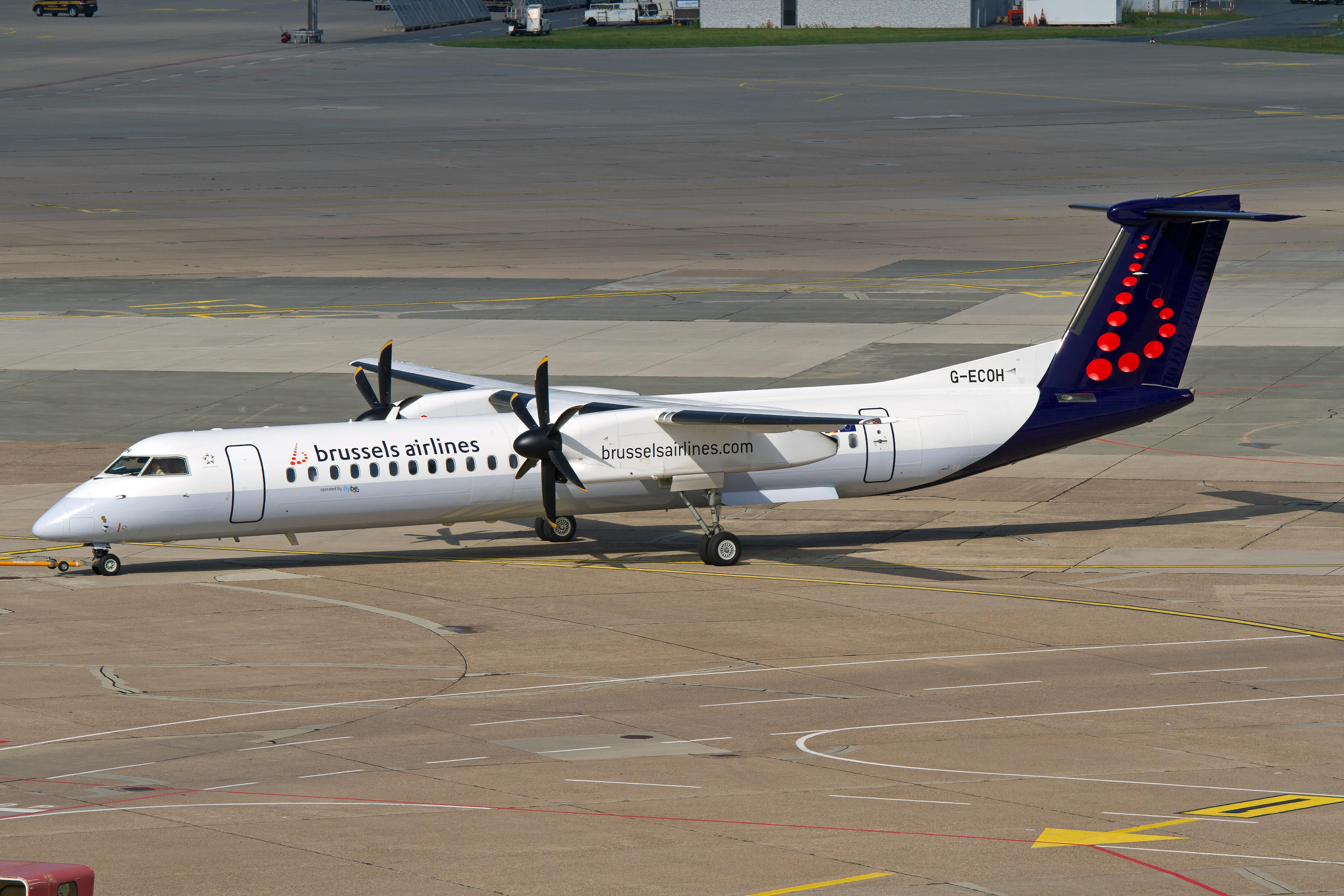
Bombardier Dash 8 leased from Flybe

=== Special liveries ===
Brussels Airlines launched a series of Belgian Icon special liveries on its Airbus A320 fleet, all representing things that are typically Belgian, including Rackham and Gravity (two Tintin themed aircraft), Magritte (an ode to the famous surrealist artist René Magritte), Trident (the aircraft for the Belgium national football team) and Amare (Tomorrowland Festival theme). On 24 March 2018 the airline introduced an additional aircraft themed to The Smurfs. In spring 2019 an additional aircraft was dedicated to the famous Flemish painter Bruegel.

The Magritte special livery was repainted in a Star Alliance livery in May 2021 and as of 2024, of the formerly six Belgian Icons variants, only the special livery dedicated to Tintin remained as all other aircraft have been repainted since as well. However, new versions of the former Tomorrowland livery and Trident livery were unveiled, as well as a new livery dedicated to the Atomium.

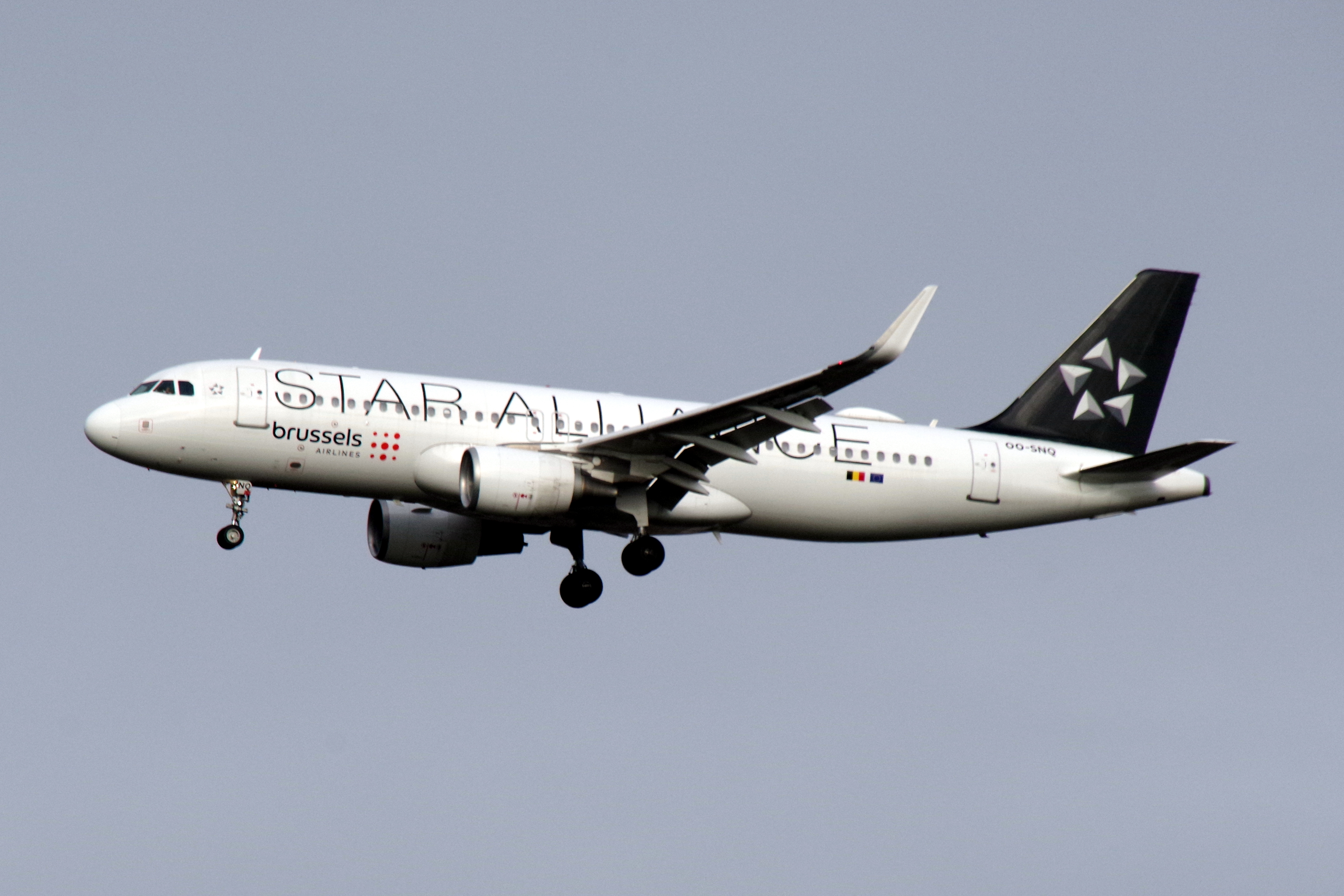
Airbus A320 in Star Alliance livery

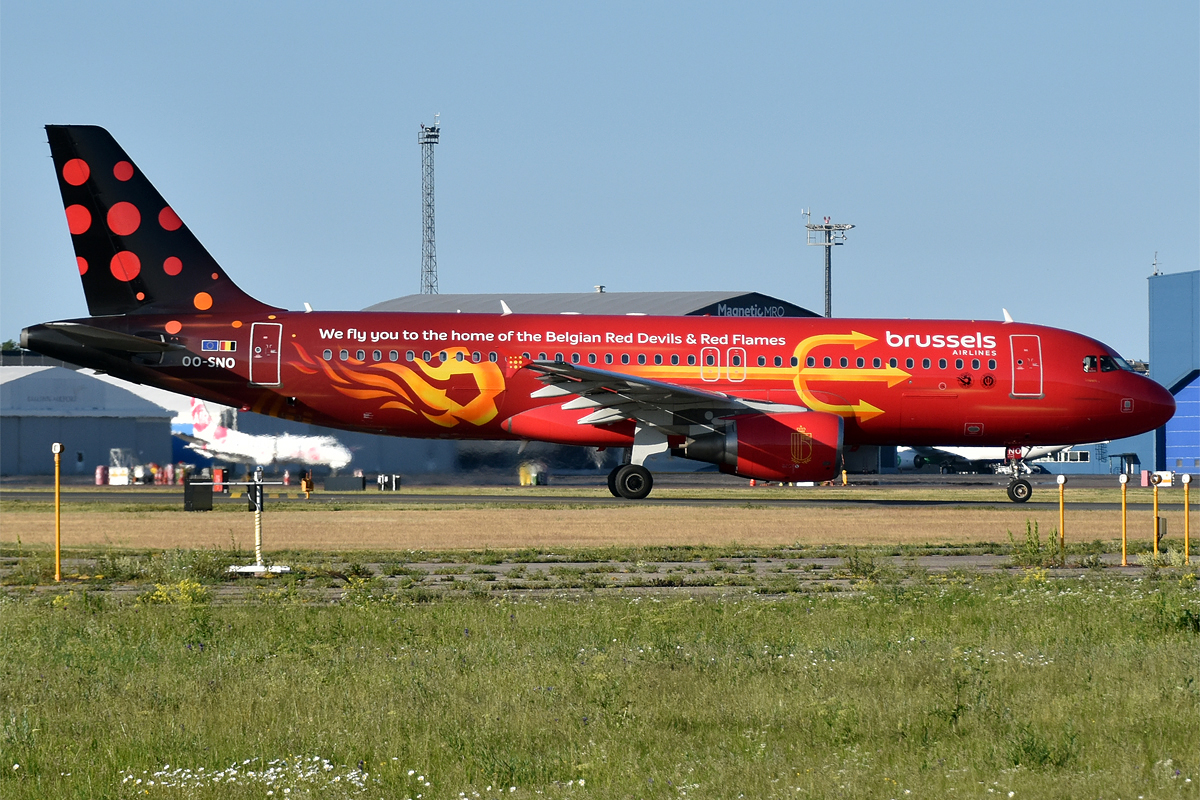
Airbus A320 in Red Devils livery

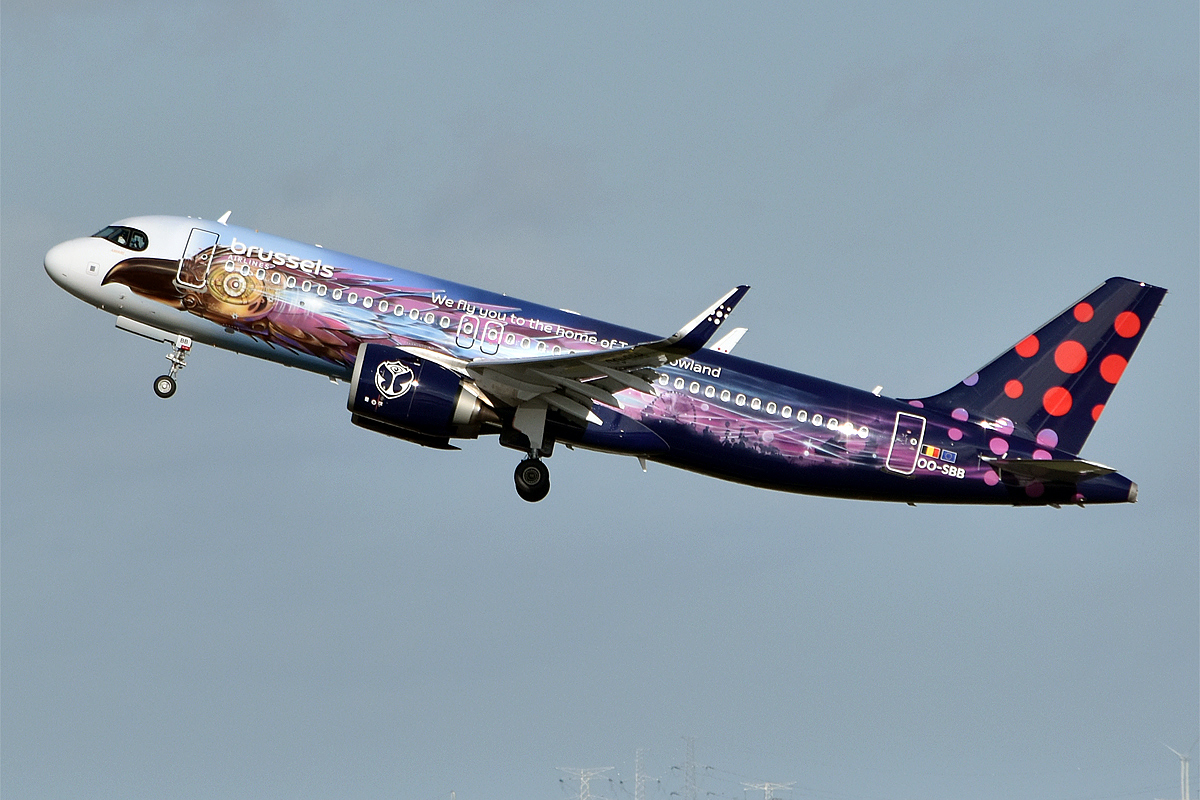
Airbus A320neo in Amare Tomorrowland livery

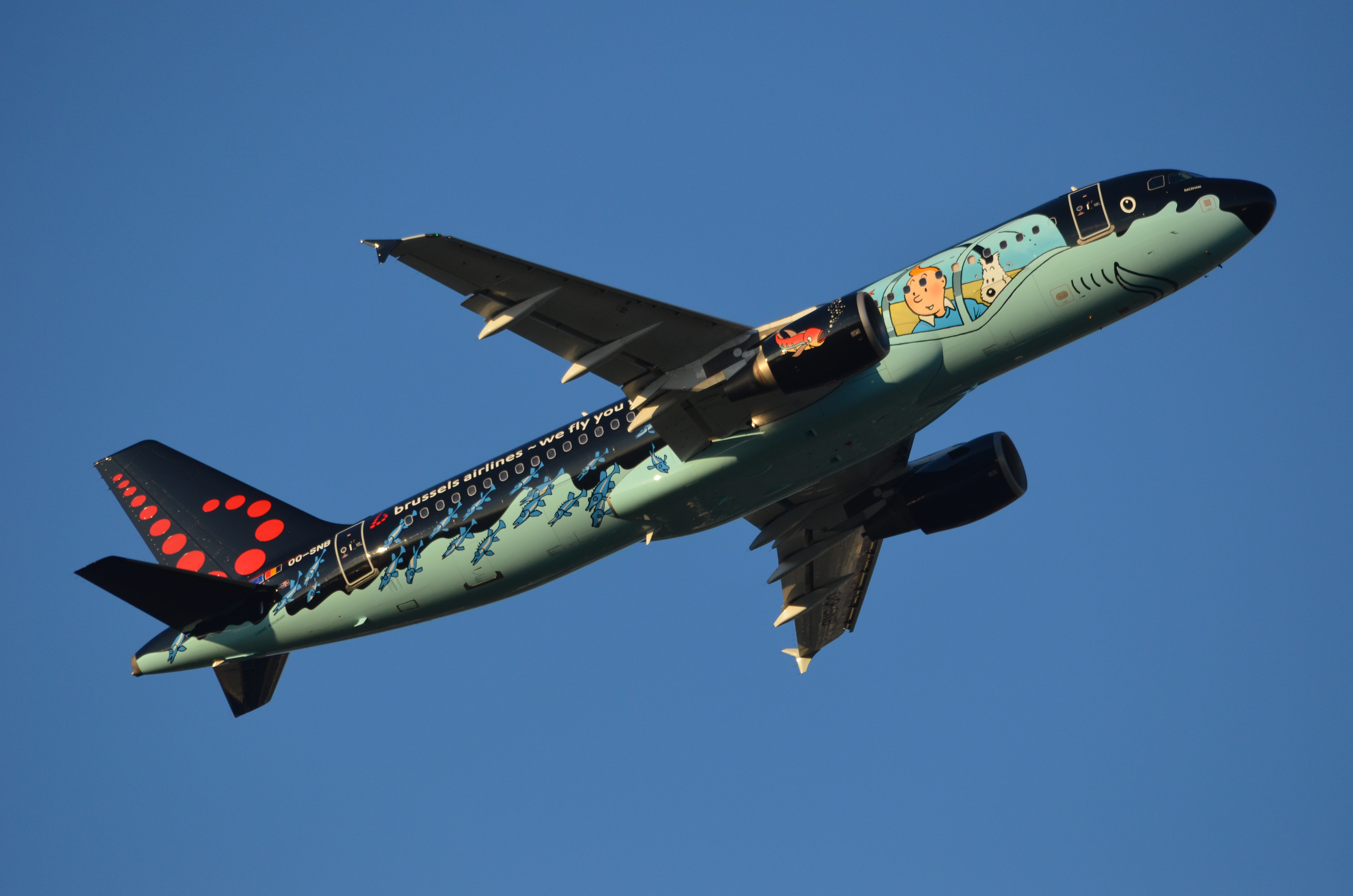
Airbus A320-200 in The Adventures of Tintin livery

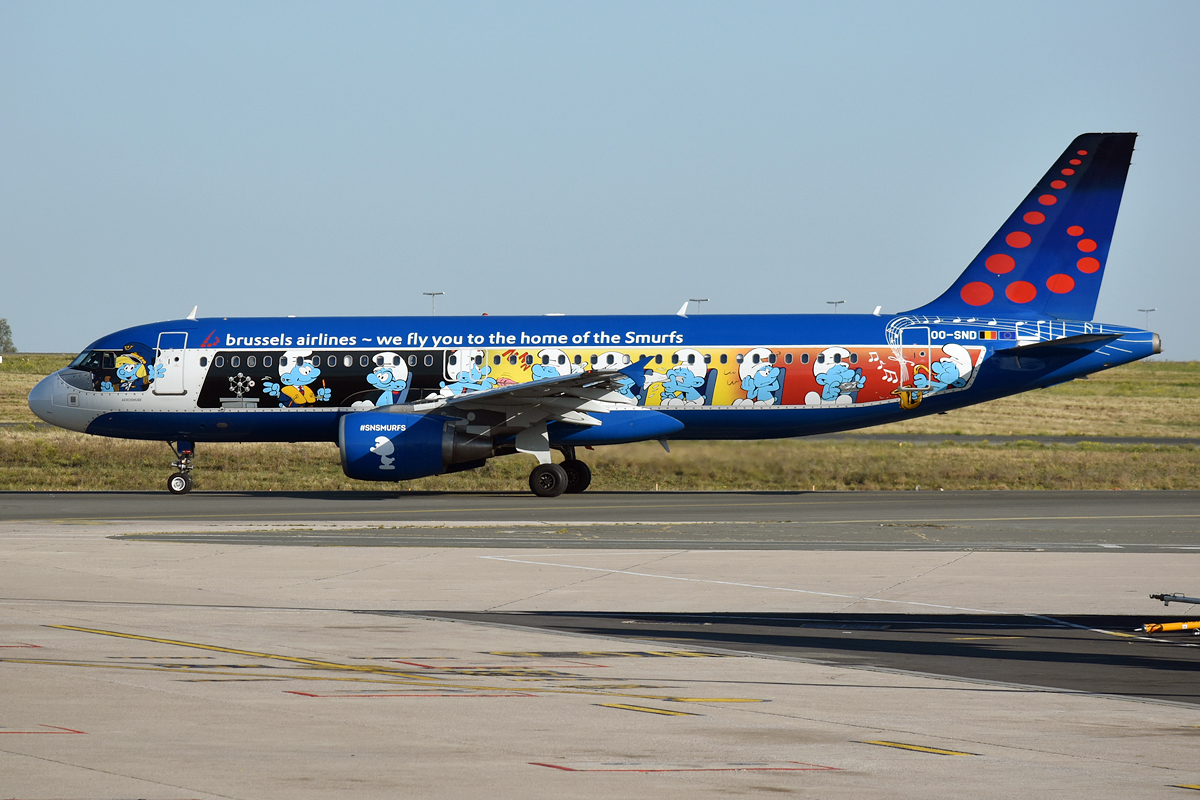
Airbus A320-200 in The Smurfs livery

== Services ==
=== Frequent-flyer programmes ===
Brussels Airlines uses Miles & More, Lufthansa's frequent flyer programme. Miles can be earned on flights operated by airlines which are part of the programme, in addition to flights operated by Star Alliance airlines. Miles can also be earned with Brussels Airlines' non-airline partners.

On 19 October 2015, Brussels Airlines launched a new customer programme called LOOP, which was available for all flights in the airline's network. It was designed for the increasing number of customers who flew Brussels Airlines regularly and did not receive significant benefits from traditional frequent flyer programmes. The LOOP programme was discontinued on 1 February 2020.

=== In-flight entertainment ===
Brussels Airlines offers two in-flight magazines. For the European network, there is b-there! which is a monthly magazine. On the African network, the magazine is named B Spirit Magazine, which is published every two months. The magazines are also available as a freely downloadable application for Apple iPad.

From November 2011 until the end of 2012 Brussels Airlines introduced a new interior on the A330 fleet. The new economy seats feature AVOD personal in-flight entertainment 9 inch screens. Additionally, business class has new lie-flat seats with an improved AVOD IFE system with 15 inch screens, supplied by the IMS-Company and known as "RAVE".

== Recognition ==
=== The world’s best airlines 2024 ===
The AirHelp Score Report 2024 named Brussels Airlines the top airline out of 109 evaluated. AirHelp, an EU-based claims processing agency, assessed airlines based on global customer claims, punctuality, and traveler feedback from 54 countries, focusing on factors such as food quality, seating comfort, and crew service.

== See also ==
- List of airports in Belgium
- Transport in Belgium
