= Hewa Bora Airways =

Airline of the Democratic Republic of the Congo

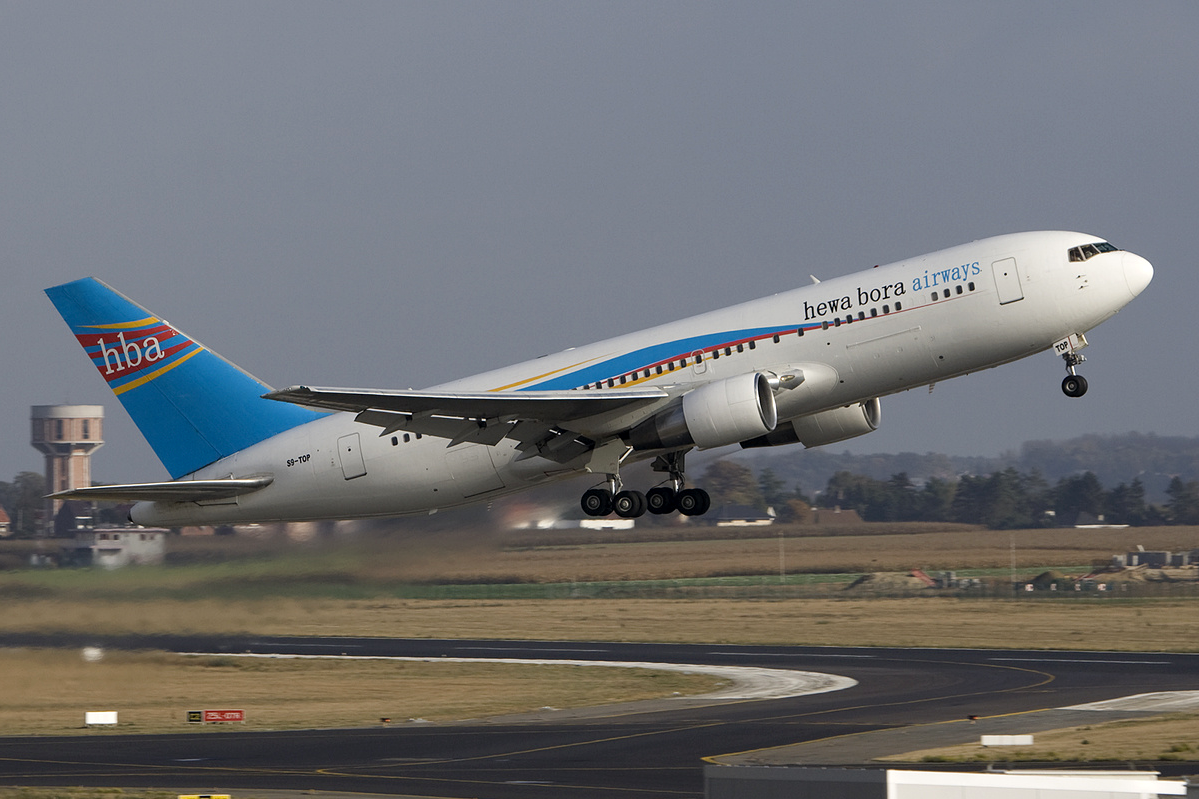
- A Hewa Bora Airways Boeing 767-200ER taking off from Brussels Airport (2009)
IATA	ICAO	Call sign
EO	ALX	ALLCONGO
- Founded: 1994
- Ceased operations: 8 July 2011
- Hubs: N'djili Airport
- Frequent-flyer program: HBA Pass
- Fleet size: 6
- Destinations: 15
- Headquarters: Barumbu, Kinshasa, Democratic Republic of the Congo
- Key people: Stavros Papaioannou (CEO) Ansar Mwananteba (President)
- Website: www.hba.cd

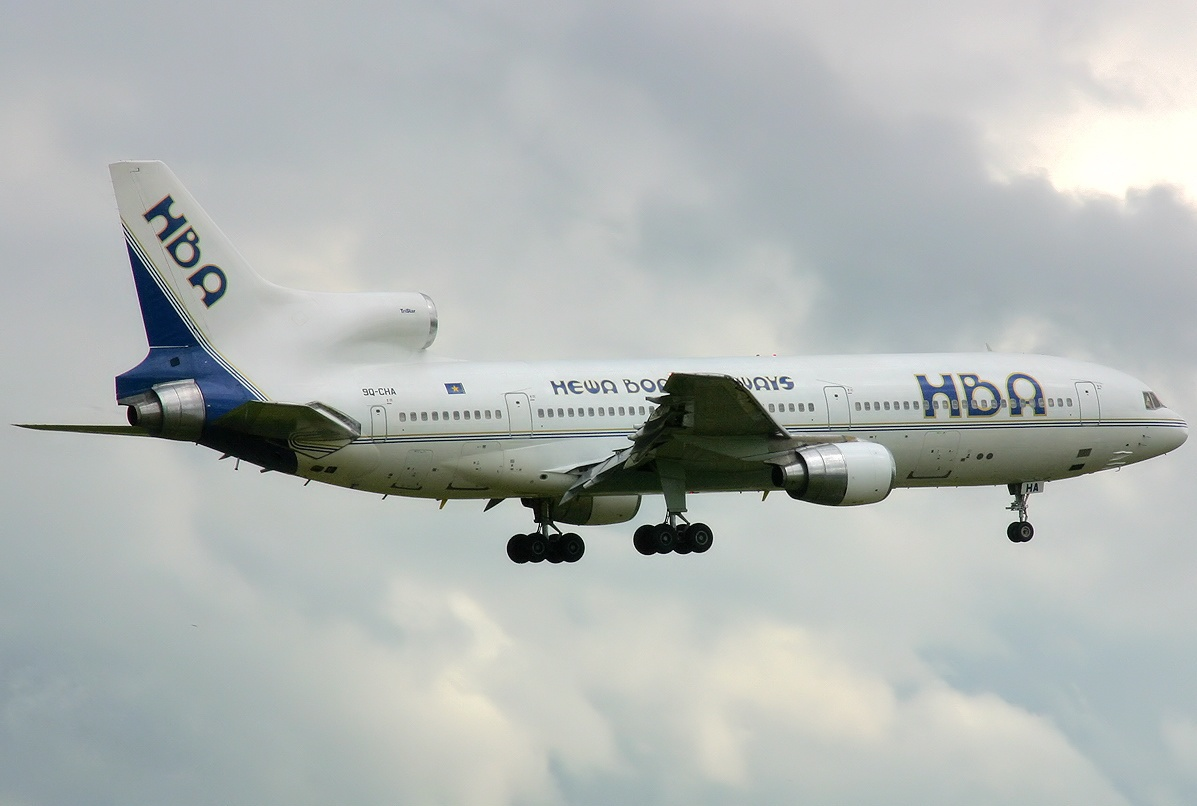
A Hewa Bora Airways Lockheed L-1011 in the old livery landing at Brussels Airport, Belgium (2002)

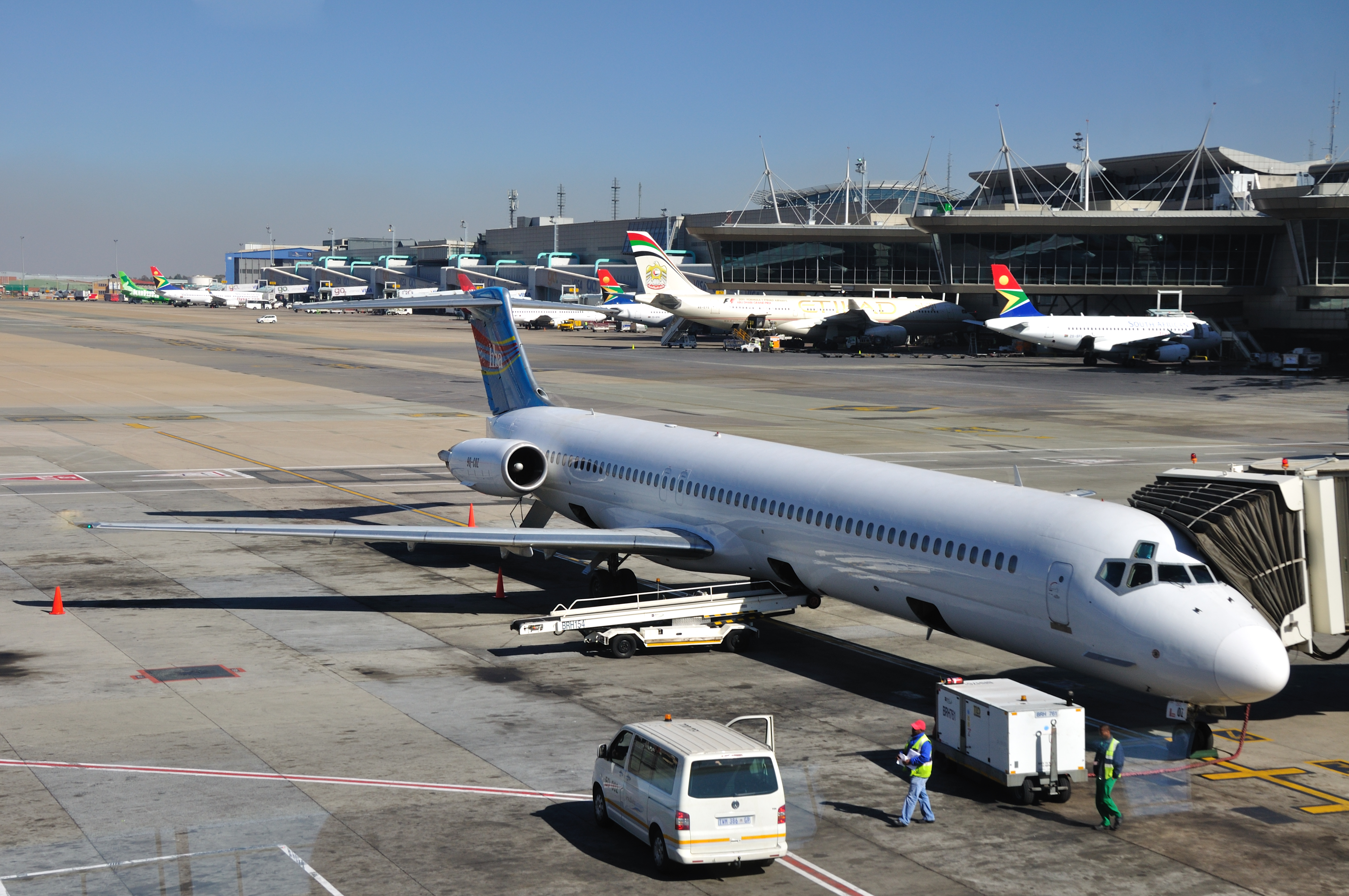
A Hewa Bora Airways McDonnell Douglas MD-82 parked at OR Tambo International Airport, South Africa (2011)

Hewa Bora Airways Sarl (operating as Hewa Bora Airways) was the national airline of the Democratic Republic of the Congo based in Barumbu, Kinshasa, Democratic Republic of the Congo. It was one of Congo's largest airlines and operated regional and domestic services. Its main base was N'djili Airport. "Hewa bora" is Swahili for "fresh air". The company slogan was N°1 in Democratic Republic of the Congo.

Hewa Bora Airways had 1,100 employees in March 2007.

Operations were suspended after the 2011 crash of Hewa Bora Airways Flight 952, and the airline is now defunct. The remains of the business were taken over by a new airline, FlyCongo, which in turn merged with the Compagnie Africaine d'Aviation only six months after it was started up.

== History ==
The airline was established and started operations in 1998 with the joining together of Zaire Airlines, Zaire Express, and Congo Airlines.

On 1 November 2007, HBA (51%) and Brussels Airlines subsidiary Pan African Airlines (49%) announced a new domestic partnership to be called AirDC, to operate BAe 146-200 and Boeing 737 aircraft, principally to Lubumbashi, Mbuji-Mayi, Brazzaville, and Douala. This project was cancelled because of disagreements between Brussels Airlines and Hewa Bora. On 15 December 2009, Brussels Airlines announced they were working on a new airline in the Congo. The airline's name was Korongo; it was launched without Hewa Bora and started operations during 2012, suspending all operations during 2015.

On 24 June 2009, the new website of Hewa Bora Airways went online, after not having been updated since 2005.

On 16 July 2011, the airline's air operator's certificate was suspended, following the accident that befell Flight 952 on 8 July 2011.

=== Blacklist ===
The entire Hewa Bora Airways fleet was blacklisted in European airspace. The Lockheed L-1011-500 and the Boeing 767-200ER were the last planes accepted in Europe before new noise regulations and storage of the 767 definitively banned the airline. Hewa Bora Airways was the last airline allowed to operate from the Democratic Republic of the Congo into Europe.

== FlyCongo ==
In March 2012, FlyCongo launched operations with the remains of Hewa Bora. It used the airline's previous Boeing 767 and McDonnell Douglas MD-82 aircraft. It also announced it would be destroying six aircraft left behind by Hewa Bora to reduce safety concerns.

== Fleet ==
The Hewa Bora Airways fleet included the following aircraft when it suspended operations:

Hewa Bora Airways fleet
Aircraft	Total	Passengers (First/Business/Economy)
Boeing 767-200ER	1	191 (8/18/165)
McDonnell Douglas MD-82	4	136 (0/16/120)
Hawker Siddeley HS125	1	8 (0/8/0)
Total	6	

=== Retired fleet ===
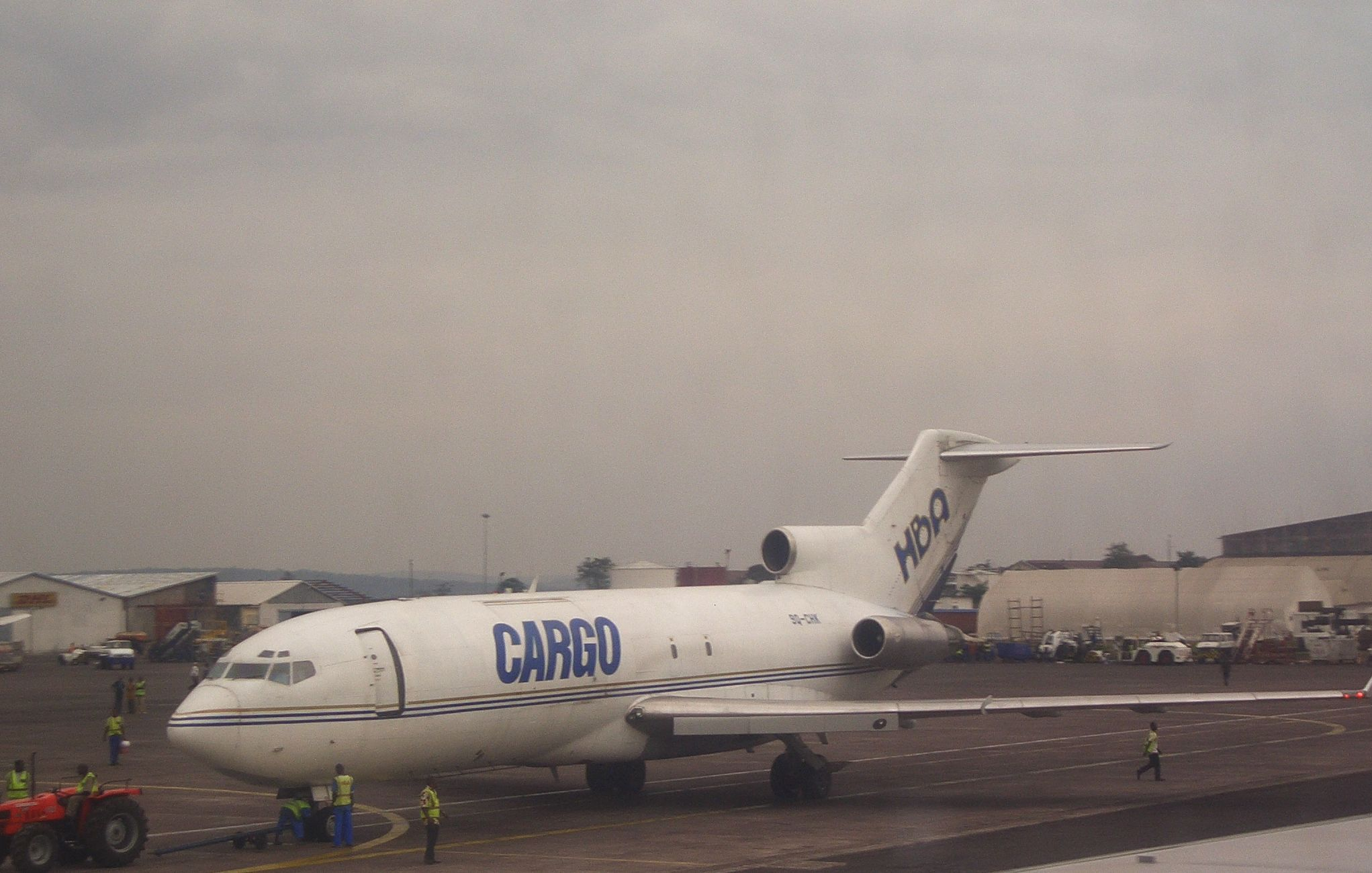
A Hewa Bora Airways Boeing 727-100F at N'djili Airport (2007)

Hewa Bora Airways also operated these aircraft prior to ceasing operations:

HBA retired fleet
Aircraft
Boeing 707-300C
Boeing 727-100
Boeing 727-100F
Boeing 727-200
Boeing 727-200Adv
Lockheed L-1011

== Incidents and accidents ==
- On 15 April 2008, Hewa Bora Airways Flight 122 crashed into a residential and market area of Goma of the Democratic Republic of the Congo. Forty people were killed, among them three passengers; 111 people were injured, including 40 passengers.
- On 8 July 2011, Hewa Bora Airways Flight 952, a Boeing 727-100, crashed on landing at Kisangani Airport; 74 people were killed, whilst others survived the accident with severe burns.

== See also ==
- Transport in the Democratic Republic of the Congo
