= FlyCongo =

Airline of the Democratic Republic of the Congo

IATA	ICAO	Call sign
EO	ALX	ALLCONGO
- Founded: 2012
- Commenced operations: 24 March 2012
- Ceased operations: October, 2012
- Operating bases: N'djili Airport
- Fleet size: 5
- Destinations: 6
- Headquarters: Kinshasa, Democratic Republic of the Congo
- Key people: Jean-Marc Pajot (CEO), A.Mwananteba (Owner)
- Website: www.flycongo.com

FlyCongo was an airline based in the Democratic Republic of the Congo. It was formed due to the suspension of Hewa Bora Airways after a series of fatal accidents. The new airline aimed to show a huge improvement in air safety in the Democratic Republic of the Congo. After only 6 months in operation the company merged with Compagnie Africaine d'Aviation (CAA) in October, 2012. The company slogan was Like Never Before!

== History ==
Founded in 2012 from the remains of Hewa Bora Airways, FlyCongo commenced operations on 24 March 2012 with a McDonnell Douglas MD-82 aircraft.

On 27 March 2012, FlyCongo announced that they will be destroying six of the previous aircraft operated by Hewa Bora Airways in a bid to boost confidence in the new airline. The aircraft will be five Boeing 727s and one of another unknown type.

In 2012 CAA formed a commercial and strategic alliance with rival FlyCongo which led to consolidation into a single brand, flyCAA, in October 2012.

== Destinations ==
FlyCongo served the following destinations (as of April 2012):

^{[Base]}	Base

City	Country	IATA	ICAO	Airport
Gemena	Democratic Republic of the Congo	GMA	FZFK	Gemena Airport
Goma	Democratic Republic of the Congo	GOM	FZNA	Goma International Airport
Johannesburg	South Africa	JNB	FAJS	OR Tambo International Airport
Kinshasa	Democratic Republic of the Congo	FIH	FZAA	N'djili Airport ^{[Base]}
Kisangani	Democratic Republic of the Congo	FKI	FZIC	Bangoka International Airport
Lubumbashi	Democratic Republic of the Congo	FBM	FZQA	Lubumbashi International Airport
Mbandaka	Democratic Republic of the Congo	MDK	FZEA	Mbandaka Airport

== Fleet ==
The FlyCongo fleet was made of the following aircraft (as of April 2014):

FlyCongo Fleet
Aircraft	Total	Notes
Boeing 767-200ER	1	Stored at FIH
Airbus A320	5	2 Inactive
Boeing 737-3B7	0	5 to enter service. Ex Batavia Air aircraft.
Fokker-50	3	
Total	10 (7 Active)	

== See also ==
- Transport in the Democratic Republic of the Congo
