= Kisangani =

City in the northeastern DR Congo

Kisangani Mji wa Kisangani/Jiji la Kisangani (Swahili)
- Provincial capital and city
- Ville de Kisangani
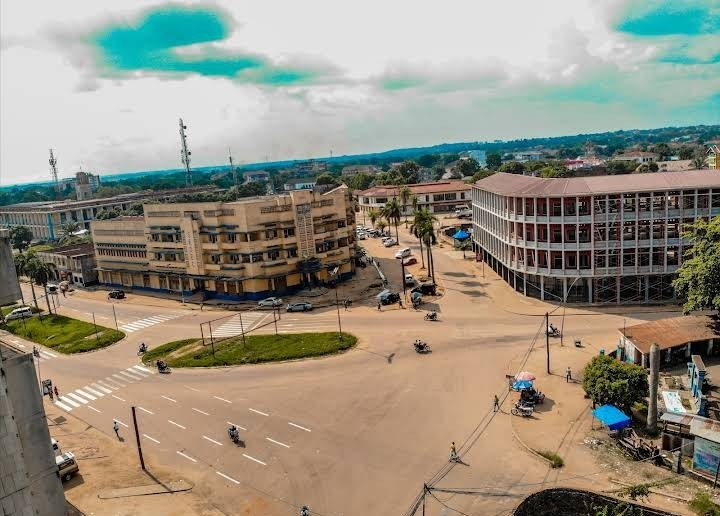
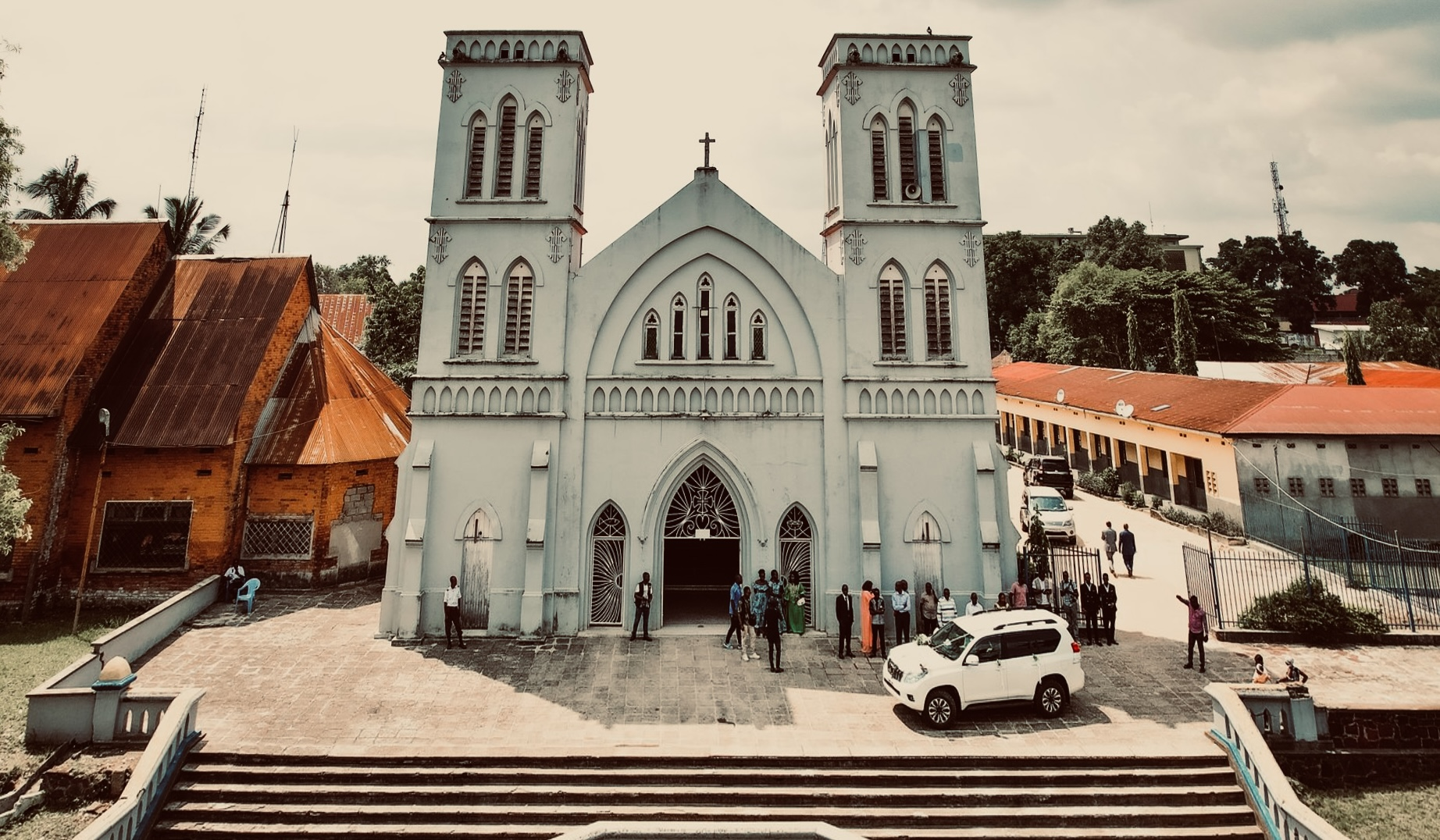
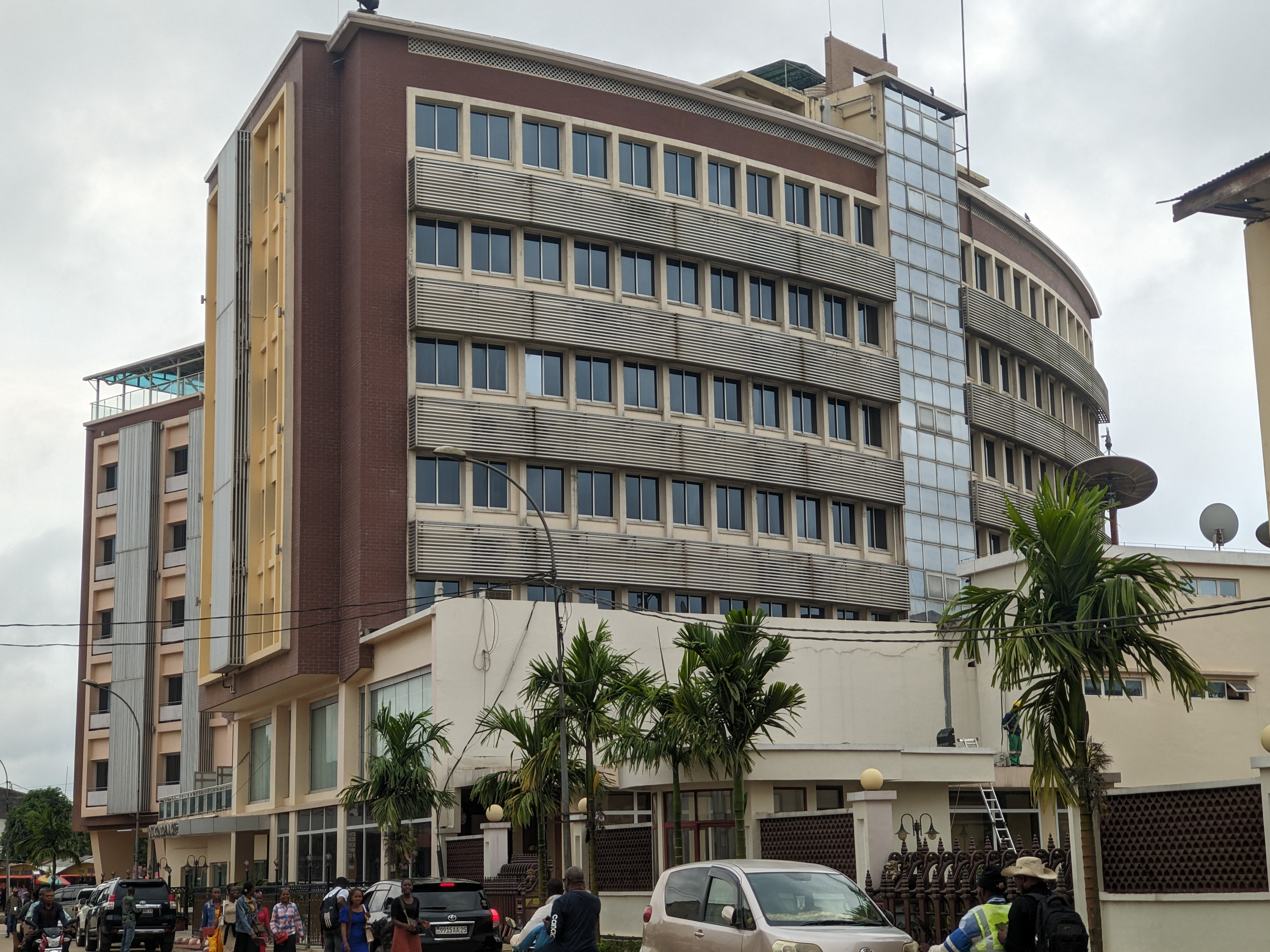
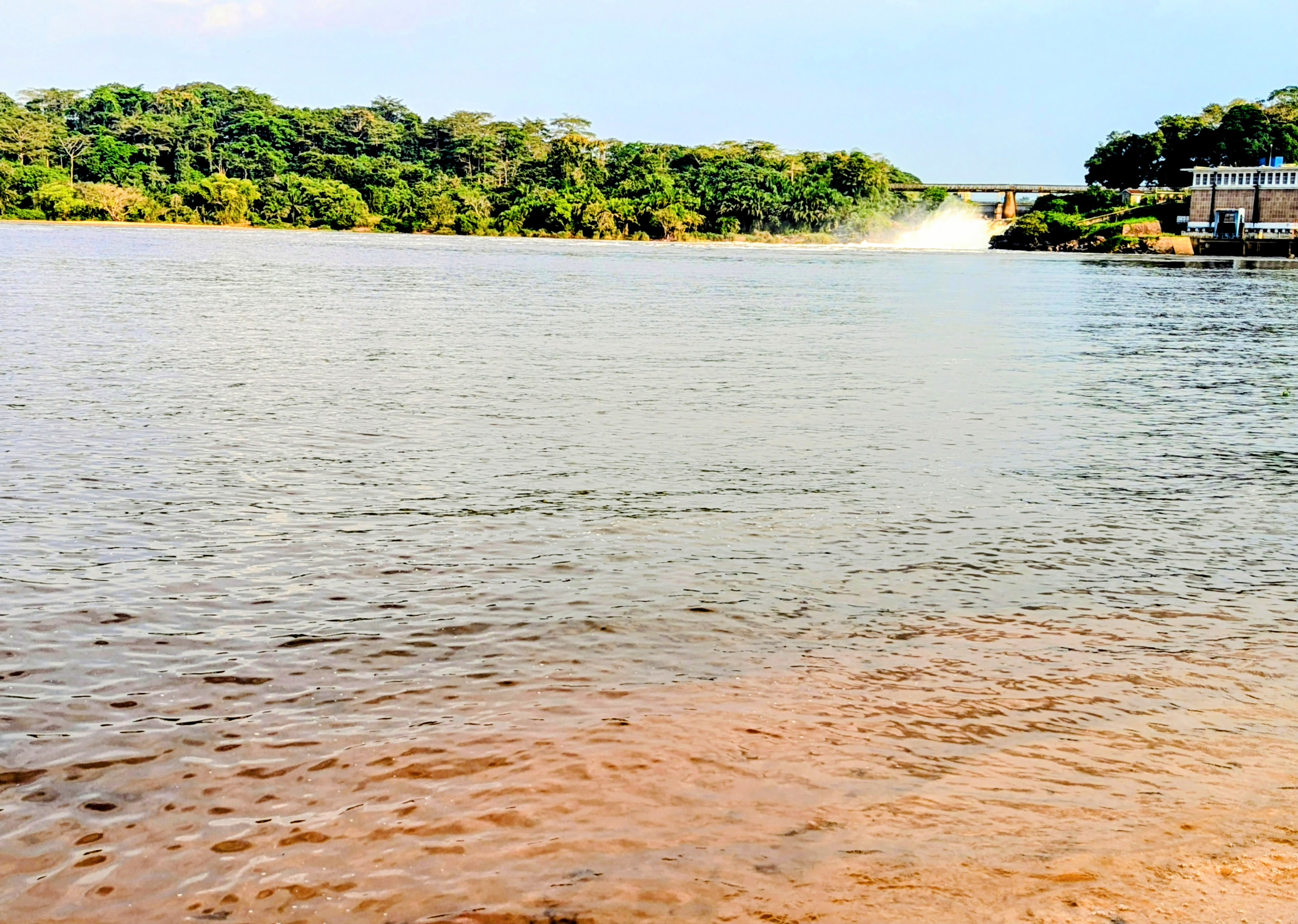
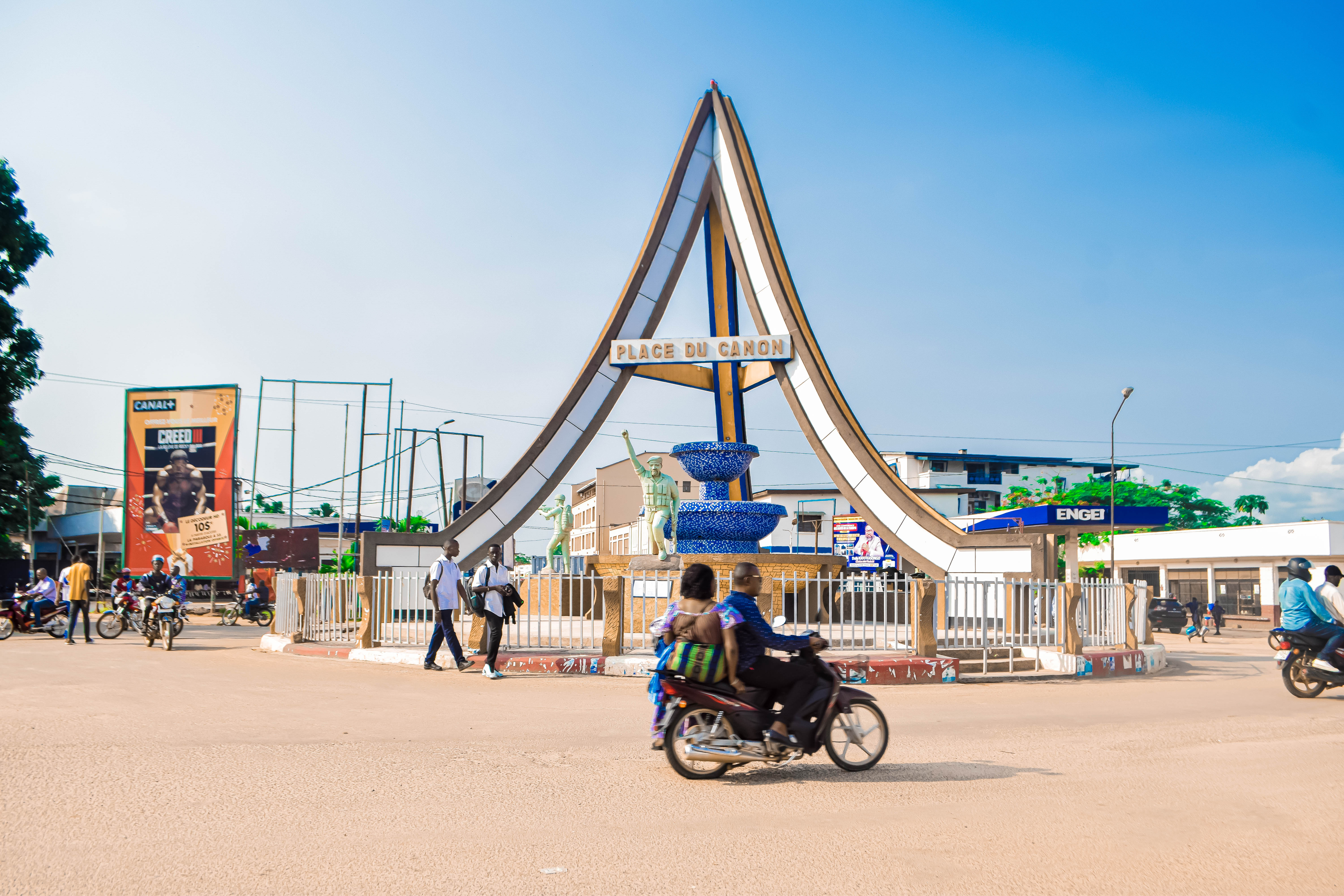
- Boulevard Lumumba Our Lady of the Rosary Cathedral Hotel Congo Palace Tshopo River Rond-Point du Canon
- Nickname: Boyoma
- Location in Democratic Republic of the Congo
- Coordinates: 0°31′0″N 25°12′0″E
- Country: DR Congo
- Province: Tshopo Province
- Communes: Lubunga, Makiso, Mangobo, Tshopo, Kabondo, Kisangani

Government
  - Mayor: Delly Likunde

Area
  - City: 1,910 km^{2} (740 sq mi)
- Elevation: 447 m (1,467 ft)

Population (2016)
  - City: 1,602,144
  - Density: 839/km^{2} (2,170/sq mi)
  - Urban: 1,081,000
  - Ethnicities: Bamanga; Popoi; Boa; Lokele; Turumbu; Mbole; Kumu; Wagenia; Rega; Topoke; Basoko; Lendu; Budu; Bangetu; Logo; Alur; Hema; Azande; Ungwana; Lengola; Nguelima; Mangbetu
- Time zone: UTC+2 (Central Africa Time)
- License Plate Code: (Democratic Republic of the Congo) CGO / 25
- Climate: af

Kisangani (/kiːsəŋˈɡɑːni/), formerly Stanleyville (Dutch: Stanleystad), is the capital of Tshopo Province, located on the Congo River in the eastern part of the central Congo Basin in the Democratic Republic of the Congo. It is the country's fifth-most populous urban area, with an estimated population of 1,602,144 as of 2016, and the largest of the cities in the tropical woodlands of the Congo.

Geographically, Kisangani is flanked by Banalia Territory to the north, Bafwasende to the east, Ubundu Territory to the south, and is bordered by both Opala and Isangi Territories to the west. The city spans an area of 1,910 square kilometres (740 sq mi) and is situated within the equatorial forest plain at coordinates 0°30' north latitude and 25°20' east longitude, just 80 kilometres (50 mi) from the equator. Kisangani is located approximately 2,100 kilometres (1,300 mi) from the mouth of the Congo River, making it the furthest navigable point upstream.

Kisangani is administratively divided into six communes. Five communes—Kabondo, Kisangani, Makiso, Mangobo, and Tshopo—are strategically situated on the right bank, while the Lubunga commune is on the left bank.

Kisangani is the nation's most important inland port after Kinshasa, an important commercial hub point for river and land transportation and a major marketing and distribution centre for the north-eastern part of the country. It has been the commercial capital of the northern Congo since the late 19th century.

== History ==
=== Early history and the founding of Stanley Falls Station ===
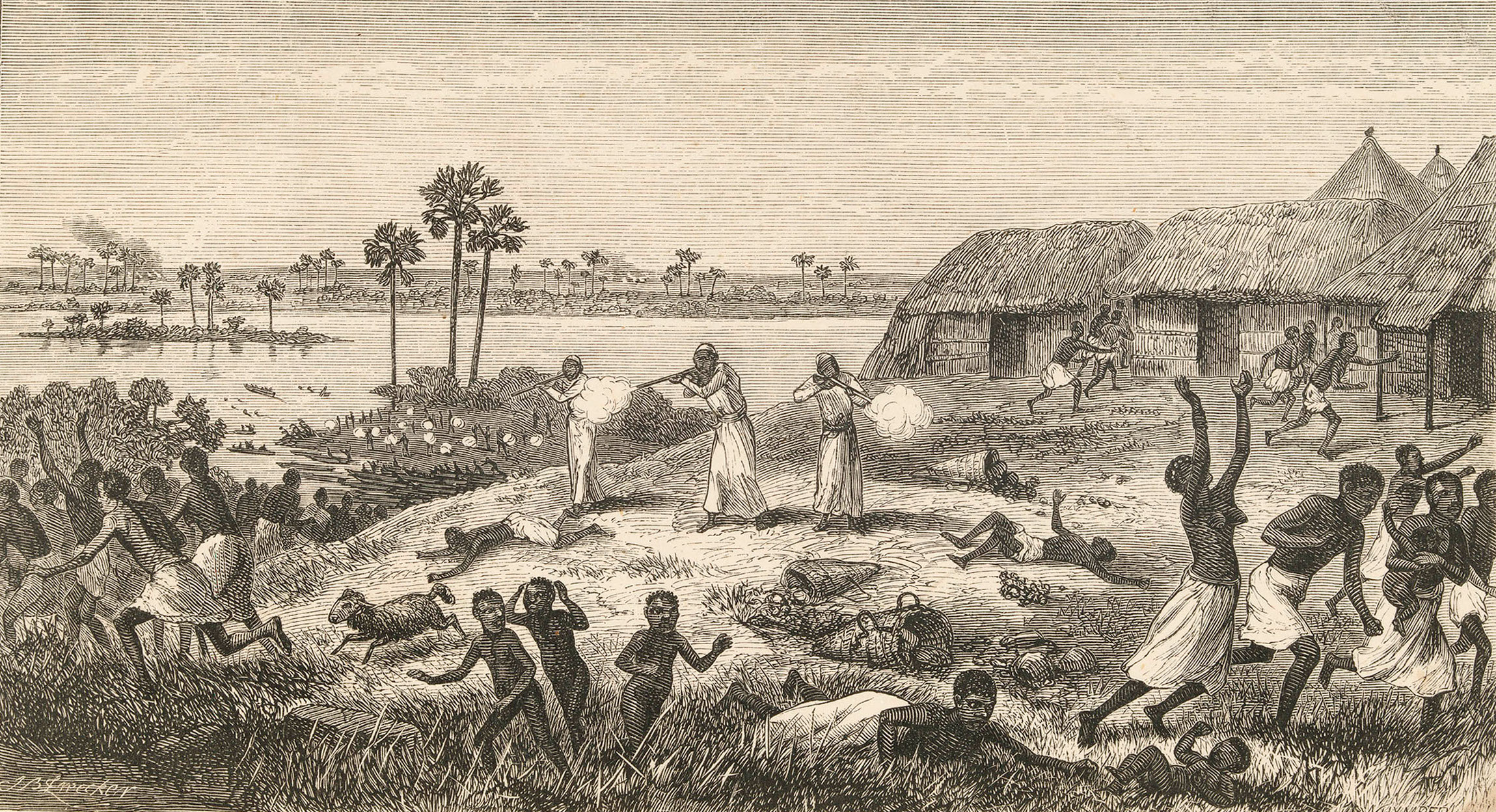
An Arab slave raid on Nyangwe, 1871

Before Henry Morton Stanley, working on behalf of King Leopold II of the Belgians, founded what would become Stanley Falls Station in 1883, the area was inhabited by the Wagenya people, who used Wagenia Falls (which was formerly named Stanley Falls) for fishing. The station was founded on the Island of Wana Rusari, a few meters from the contemporary site of Kisangani, along the Lualaba River. This area, characterised by its seven falls spanning 100 kilometres (62 mi) between Kisangani and Ubundu, was first traversed by Stanley in 1877 after navigating the rapids and falls that impeded further upstream navigation, mistakenly believing he was descending the Nile River.

He documented that approximately a thousand fish were caught daily in Stanley Falls, each weighing between 2 to 20 kilograms (4.4 to 44.1 lb), with the Wagenya maintaining significant reserves of smoked fish for trade. The trade network extended beyond foodstuffs to include canoes, fishing nets, pottery, wooden utensils, and metallic objects crafted by specialised artisans, often from distinct ethnic groups, such as the Ramangas, renowned for their expertise in canoe and wooden furniture manufacturing.

Stanley returned to the region on 1 December 1883 to establish the initial trading post in the region, situated approximately 2,100 kilometres (1,300 mi) from the Congo River's mouth, following negotiations with Arab-Swahili traders who had settled in the area the previous year. The station, designated as the ultimate destination of the expedition, was commissioned by the Comité d'études du Haut-Congo. Stanley was accompanied by two British engineers, a German mechanic, and a sailor from Stanleyville, with British engineer Adrian Binnie assuming the role of station director.

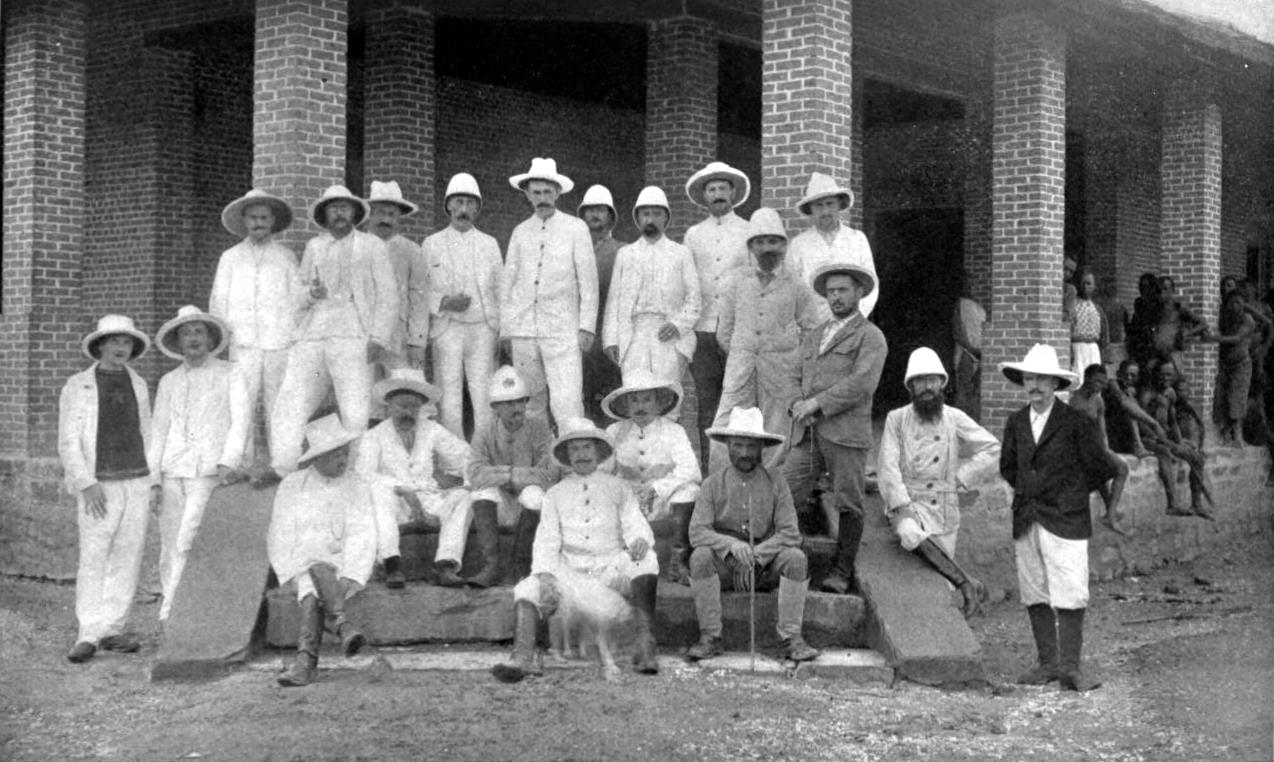
Europeans at Stanleyville in 1902

Initially referred to as Falls Station or "The Post Stanley Falls", "The Falls", or colloquially "Boyoma" (the indigenous name for Boyoma Falls), the settlement was consistently identified as "Kisangani" by the local populace, while Europeans commonly used the French term Stanleyville (or Stanleystad in Dutch). The Swahili language manual published by the Marist Brothers in the 1920s provides an instance of this naming substitution: "from X to Stanleyville" is translated as "toka X Mpaka Kisangani".

The name "Kisangani" is a Swahili interpretation of the indigenous term Boyoma, denoting "City on the Island", and is similarly rendered in Lingala as Singitini (or Singatini). Stanley subsequently journeyed to Bas-Congo (modern-day Kongo Central Province) and entrusted the settlement to Adrian Binnie, who, alongside twenty Hausa and ten Wangwana, became the principal representative of King Leopold II's Congo Free State in the region. Binnie expanded Stanley's holdings, clearing land and constructing a village, complete with gardens.

=== Congo Arab War ===
Following the establishment of relations between the local African communities and European traders, Arab-Swahili slave traders from Zanzibar, reached Stanley Falls from the east. Relations between Free State officials and the slavers were fraught with tension. In October 1884, Lieutenant Arvid Wester, who had succeeded Binnie as the station's overseer, brokered a treaty with the Arab Swahili slavers. The treaty, signed by a son of the infamous Afro-Omani slave trader Tippu Tip, was intended to curb slave raiding and foster peaceful relations with whites in the region. However, the treaty was short-lived, as Tippu Tip's forces soon resumed their activities, which exacerbated tensions. The natives simultaneously placed themselves under the protection of the International Association of the Congo, albeit without success.

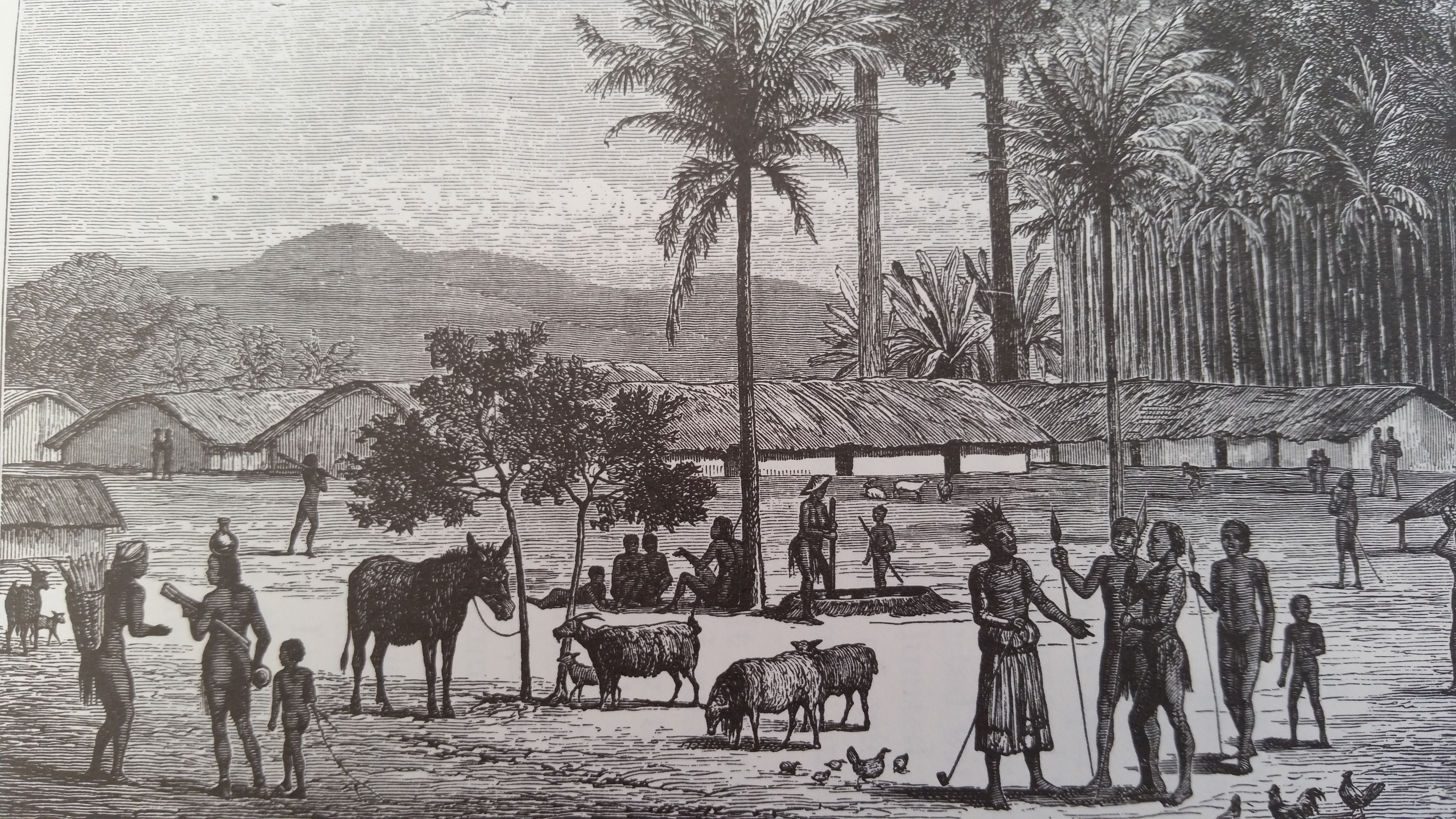
A Manyema settlement in 1876, whose forces crossed from the mainland and attacked the Stanley Falls Station

By January 1885, Captain Alphonse van Gèle arrived at Stanley Falls, following his exploration of the Ubangi River, only to discover that Tippu Tip had devastated the surrounding area and, on behalf of the Sultan of Zanzibar, repudiated the treaty. This incident marked the onset of the Congo Arab War, during which the eastern border of the Congo Free State became a battleground for control over the lucrative Arab slave trade. To protect Stanley Falls Station, Walter Deane, an officer dispatched by Francis de Winton, arrived with a contingent of thirty-two Hausa soldiers and forty Bangala auxiliaries. Although they were promised an ample supply of ammunition and reinforcements, these resources never materialised. The situation deteriorated in mid-July 1886 with the return of Tippu Tip to Zanzibar, leaving his brother-in-law and business partner, Bwana Nzige, and Nzige's son, Rashid, to oversee their operations in the region. When an enslaved woman from a nearby village, who had been cruelly flogged by her Arab Swahili master, sought refuge in Deane's camp, tensions reached a boiling point. Deane refused to return the woman to her master, offering to pay her ransom instead. This act of defiance incited Tippu Tip's men, who accused Deane of stealing the woman. Although threatened, Deane was not immediately attacked until the arrival of a river steamer, which brought only one Belgian officer, Lieutenant Dubois, but none of the promised reinforcements or supplies. A large force of Manyema crossed from the mainland at night to assault the station. Despite holding out for three days, the defenders were eventually overwhelmed as their ammunition dwindled, resulting in the deaths of seven Hausas, while the Bangala auxiliaries fled, promising to inform the authorities as they retreated downriver. On 26 August 1886, Deane and Dubois set fire to the station and sought refuge in the surrounding woods. Dubois drowned while attempting to cross to the mainland, while the remaining survivors endured thirty days in the wilderness until they were finally rescued by Captain Camille Coquilhat.

=== Establishment of Stanleyville and Kisangani ===
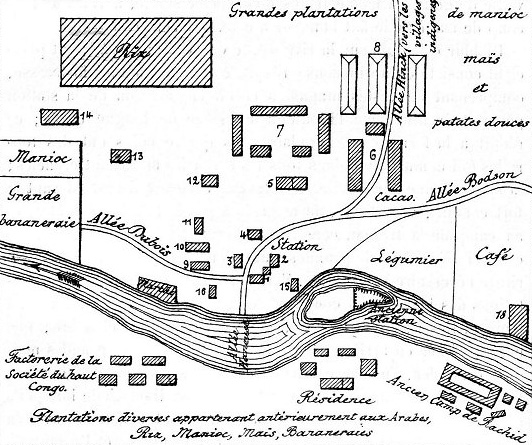
A map of Stanley Falls Station in 1893, laying the foundations of Kisangani

On 3 September 1886, Administrator General Camille Janssen issued a decree establishing nine districts within the colony, including Stanley Falls District, each governed by a district commissioner. In 1887, Stanley proposed Tippu Tip as the governor (wali) of the Stanley Falls District, a proposal accepted by both Leopold II and Barghash bin Said. Tippu Tip assumed the position on 24 February 1887, and Stanley Falls District remained under Arab control until June 1888. Hostilities resumed, and Arab Swahili influence in Stanley Falls District was not decisively eliminated until 1893.

On 15 July 1898, the Governor General decreed that the Stanley Falls District would henceforth be called the Eastern Province (Province Orientale), with Stanleyville designated as its capital. The city evolved into a significant terminus for steamer navigation on the Congo River, transforming from a modest trading post into a burgeoning urban centre and serving as the headquarters for the entire eastern Congo Free State, including Katanga and Kivu, for several years until 1933. However, Stanleyville remained an underdeveloped administrative hub surrounded by native Congolese villages. As noted by Bogumil Jewsiewicki's "According to the testimony of the age",

"The villages of the Arabs, Kisangani-Singitini, as well as those of the Wagenya and the Lokeles around the Falls appear prosperous. Yet, they remain strangers to the town and are not part of its monetary economy. Their trade with the town is limited to the exchange of foodstuffs against indigo obtained from soldiers. The Wagenya especially exchange fish for cloth brought by the administration or its workers".

The establishment of the CFL (Compagnie du Chemin de Fer du Congo Supérieur aux Grands Lacs Africains) in 1902, with the mandate of constructing a rail/river linkage between Stanleyville and Katanga, accelerated development with the labor force ranging from 1,200 to 4,100 men. The construction of the Stanleyville-Ponthierville (now Ubundu) railway, initiated in February 1903 and concluded in September 1909, spurred substantial urban expansion with lined and overhung trees, buildings surrounded by trees in bloom, well-constructed residential and commercial buildings. Stanleyville's economic significance largely stemmed from its location in a marshy tropical rainforest, which endows it with abundant natural resources. Its strategic position at a key freight breakpoint on the river also makes Stanleyville a vital hub for communications and goods transshipment operations. During the Belgian Congo colonial period, Stanleyville's urban structure comprised a commercial centre and residential districts for Europeans (Belgians, Portuguese) and Asians, separated from the all-black "indigenous camps" by green strips, schools, military barracks or playgrounds.

The city's official status was formalised by incorporation Order No. 12/357 on 6 September 1958, dividing Stanleyville into four communes: Belgian I, Belgian II, Brussels, and Stanley. Towards the end of 1958, the city became the stronghold of Patrice Lumumba, the leader of the political party Mouvement National Congolais (MNC). His strong ties with the city had been forged during his days as one of 350 clerks at the central post office. Ethiopian ONUC troops arrived in the city after July 1960. After the assassination of Lumumba in 1961, Antoine Gizenga installed the Free Republic of the Congo in Stanleyville, which competed with the central government in Leopoldville (now Kinshasa). Before the country gained independence from Belgium in 1960, Kisangani was reputed to have more Rolls-Royces per capita than any other city in the world.

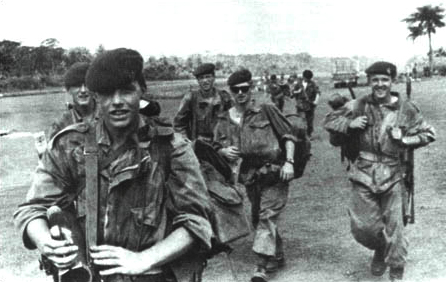
Belgian paratroopers in action during Operation Dragon Rouge in 1964

In early 1964, the Simba Rebellion ("Simba Revolution") occurred, spreading into outright rebellion by May and June. By August rebels had overrun Stanleyville from their bases in Wanie Rukula. They closed the airport and barred civilians from leaving, including at least one foreign consular staff. A number of American and European nationals were taken captive, and, following intense negotiations, Operation Dragon Rouge was launched by Belgium, the Armée Nationale Congolaise (ANC), and a plethora of foreign mercenaries under Colonel Mike Hoare to free the hostages.

Following Mobutu Sese Seko's ascension to power, on 3 May 1966, Stanleyville was renamed Kisangani as part of his authenticité policies, decreeing it the headquarters of the third economic center of Zaire, after Kinshasa and Lubumbashi. Between 1966 and 1967, Kisangani was the site of the Stanleyville mutinies, which resulted in widespread looting. As Mobutu's authenticité-driven state ideology persisted throughout the 1970s, Stanley Falls was officially renamed Boyoma Falls. On 27 October 1977, the communes were renamed as follows: Belgian I (Mangobo and Tshopo), Belgian II (Lubunga), Brussels (Kabondo), and Stanley (Makiso). By 1984, the city had a population of 317,581.

In 2010, as part of the territorial division aimed at implementing the decentralisation policy, the constitution proposed the subdivision of the territory into 26 provinces, as stipulated in Article 2 of the 2006 Constitution. Programming Law No. 15/004, which determined the modalities for the installation of these new provinces, was adopted on 28 February 2015, followed by the Organic Law establishing the boundaries of the provinces on 25 March 2015. Consequently, Orientale Province was dissolved, and Kisangani became the capital of the newly established Tshopo Province.

=== Regional conflicts ===
In the 1990s, the area emerged as the theatre for a series of major battles known as the fight of Kisangani during the First Congo War. Laurent-Désiré Kabila, leader of the Alliance of Democratic Forces for the Liberation of Congo, invaded the Congo from the eastern region of the country with assistance from Rwanda, Burundi and Uganda military forces. As of 30 October 1998, there were 15,000 Ugandan and 19,000 Rwandan troops on Congolese soil. Laurent Kabila designated Kisangani as the forward base for the foreign forces as he marched westwards towards Kinshasa to overthrow Mobutu Sese Seko.

The alliance of foreign military forces disintegrated when people of Hutu descent were massacred by the thousands in western Zaire and because of looting in the mining areas, in particular in Kisangani and the Kivus. The population was completely opposed to the presence of foreign forces because of their behaviour. Laurent-Désiré Kabila could not continue to support the use of Kisangani as the base for foreign fighters as they launched attacks to massacre the Hutu people – hence he demanded that Rwanda pull its forces out of the country.

In 1999, the city was the site of the first open fighting between Ugandan and Rwandan forces in the Second Congo War, when nearly 3,000 people died in the cross fire. This followed the fracturing of the anti-government rebel group Rally for Congolese Democracy (RCD) into camps based in Kisangani and Goma. The fighting was also over the gold mines near the town. The local population was caught in the cross fire between Ugandan and Rwandan military forces, which led to the destruction of about a quarter of the city. Various buildings were damaged, most notably the roof of the Cathedral Rosaire of Notre-Dame, which was ignited by missiles. Both of the foreign forces were reported to have looted and pillaged the city. Despite the condemnation of Uganda by the International Court of Justice, establishment of responsibility, payment of compensation, and arrests have yet to be made. Further clashes between Rwandan and Ugandan forces led to thousands more deaths and widespread destruction from 5 to 10 June 2000.

During the Second Congo War, on 14 May 2002, 160 people were massacred in Kisangani; this is believed to be the work of those under the command of Laurent Nkunda. By the time a peace agreement was signed in 2002, the town was under the control of the Rwandan-backed Rally for Congolese Democracy–Goma (RCD-Goma).

The three encounters between Uganda and Rwanda in Kisangani have been termed the wars of 1 day, 3 days and, the deadliest fought in 2000, 6 days.

== Geography ==
=== Location ===
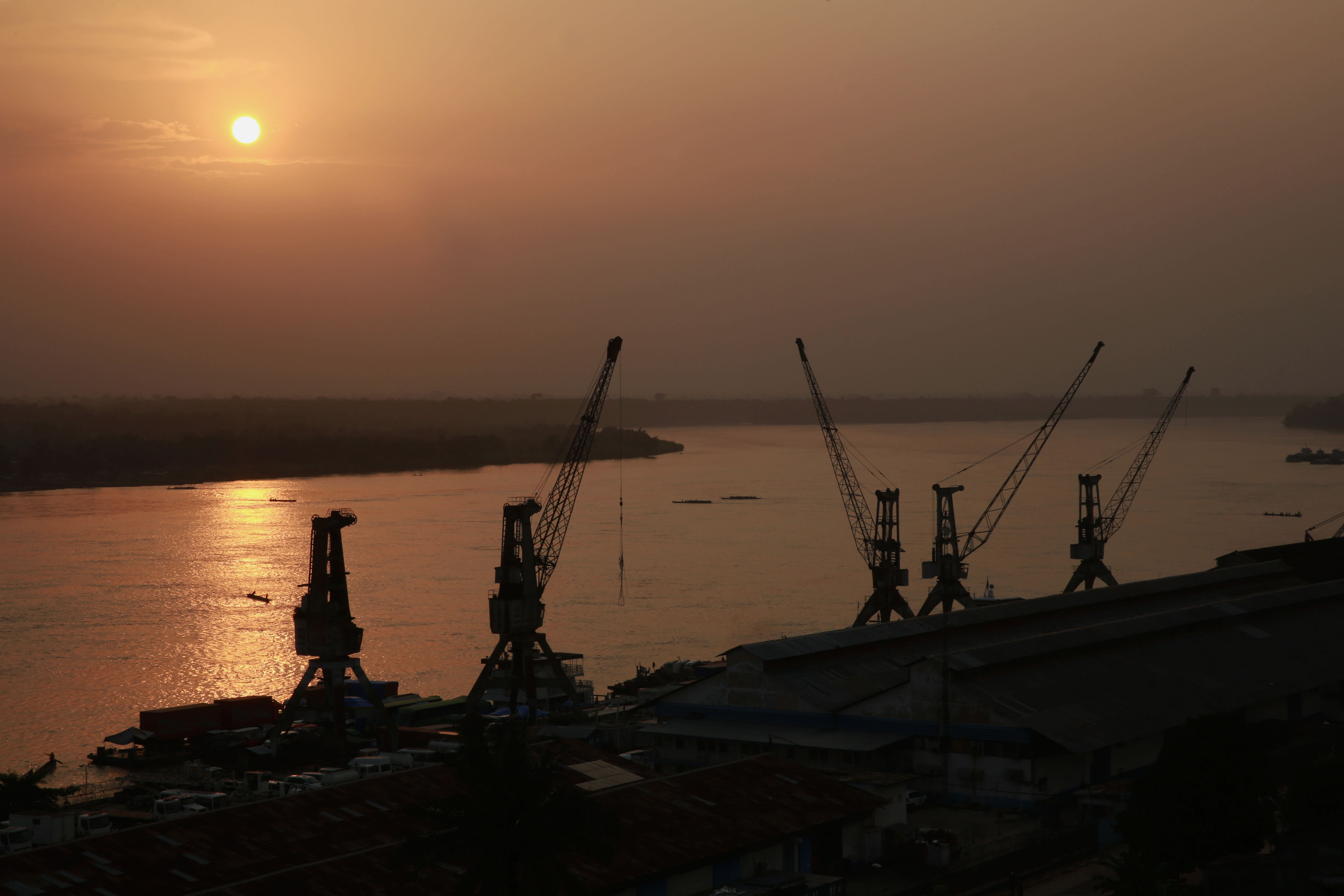
A sunset over the Congo River in Kisangani

Kisangani is strategically placed at the junction of the Congo, Tshopo, and Lindi rivers and at the crossroads between eastern and western Congo. Approximately central of the African continent, it is located in north-eastern Democratic Republic of the Congo (DRC), central of Tshopo Province. The location at the northernmost tip of the Congo River, navigable for large waterborne cargo between Kinshasa and Kisangani and connected to a natural transportation waterway for much of the Congo Basin, has helped the city grow in significance as a trading city.

Kisangani is bordered by Banalia Territory to the north, Ubundu and Opala territories to the south, Isangi to the west, and Bafwasende municipalities to the east. Kisangani lies 324 km from Buta, 572 kilometres (355 mi) from Isiro, 696 kilometres (432 mi) from Bunia and 2,912 kilometres (1,809 mi) from Kinshasa. The city's topography is diverse, with a population density of 229 residents per km^{2}. It sits in the midst of the vast and isolated Congo Basin, the second largest tropical woodlands on the planet. It is located at 0° 31' north latitude (57 km from the equator), 25° 11' east longitude from the meridian of Greenwich and 396 metres (1,299 ft) above sea level. The altitude fluctuates across different plateaus, with the Arabised plateau in the southeast and the medical plateau to the west ranging from 37 to 45 meters, and the Boyoma plateau in the northeast reaching up to 46 meters. The National Institute of Statistics (INS) reports that Kisangani covers a total area of approximately 1,910 square kilometres (740 sq mi).

=== Vegetation and forest reserves ===
Kisangani's vegetative landscape is emblematic of the central forest sector of the Guinean region, characterised by dense tropical forests that have experienced various degrees of anthropogenic degradation. The city is encircled by several significant forested reserves:

- Tshopo Falls Forest Reserve: Dominated by Terminalia superba plantations, Tshopo Falls Forest Reserve exhibits characteristics of a young secondary forest, although older sections exist in some areas. The reserve is home to 508 species of vascular plants, with families like Rubiaceae, Euphorbiaceae, Fabaceae, Poaceae, Apocynaceae, Caesalpiniaceae, Moraceae, Commelinaceae, Marantaceae and Sterculiaceae being most represented. Notable arboreal species include the introduced Millettia laurentii, alongside Musanga cercropioides, Myrianthus arboreus, Zanthoxylum fagara, Klainodoxa gabonensis, and Pycnanthus angolensis.

Kisangani Arboretum: Covering 60 hectares, this artificial forest represents a state of secondary forest with 43 cultivated tree species from 21 botanical families, including Caesalpiniaceae, Meliaceae, and Sapotaceae. The arboretum contains spontaneous trees from the pre-existing forest, such as Autranella congolensis, Donella pruniformis, Omphalocarpa procera, Gilbertiodendron dewevrei, Strombosiopsis tetrandra, Cynometra alexandrii, Entandrophragma angolense, Guarea cedrata, and Pericopsis elata.

- Masako Forest Reserve: Spanning approximately 2,105 hectares, Masako consists of both secondary and primary forests. The secondary forests house 504 species of vascular plants, with Rubiaceae, Apocynaceae, Annonaceae, Euphorbiaceae, Fabaceae, Menispermaceae, Connaraceae, Hippocrateaceae, Icacinaceae, and Sterculiaceae as dominant families. The primary forest is chiefly characterized by Gilbertiodendron dewevrei and hosts 268 species of vascular plants. The reserve is also notable for its preservation of three large relict trees, including an Entandrophragma species with a circumference of 764 cm.
- Kungulu Island Forest: This 100-hectare forest includes both secondary and primary forests, with species such as Piptadeniastrum africanum and Celtis mildbraedii predominating in the primary forest. The secondary forest comprises 254 species of vascular plants, with Musanga cecropioides as a dominant species in the younger forests.
- Yalisombo Forest: Covering approximately 170 square kilometres (66 sq mi), Yalisombo is dominated by Gilbertiodendron dewevrei and hosts 424 species of Rhizophytes. The Rubiaceae, Euphorbiaceae, Sterculiaceae, Apocynaceae, Annonaceae, Menispermaceae, Moraceae, Meliaceae, Acanthaceae, Fabaceae, and Sapotaceae families are well-represented, with species such as Brachystegia laurentii, Polyalthia suaveolens, Diospyros canaliculata, Staudtia gabonensis, Strombosia grandifolia, Streptomyces glaucescens, Garcinia polyantha, Gentiana punctata, Isolona bruneelii, Cola griseiflora, Pachystela bequaertii, Julbernardia seretii, and Manodora myristica accompanying the dominant species.

=== Floral Islands ===
Kisangani is encircled by several significant forest islands, which are more or less on the outskirts and positioned relatively distant from the city centre. Notable among these floral islets are Mbie Island, characterized by patches of degraded primary forests and secondary forests dominated by Gilbertiodendron dewevrei and Scorodophloeus zenkeri. The Kilometer 25 Rail Forest Reserve, sprawling over 3,370 hectares, has been reforested with diverse tree species, including Terminalia superba, Pericopsis elata, Entandrophragma cylindricum, and Khaya anthotheca. The Kilometer 32 Rail Forest Reserve, covering 3,605 hectares, also features reforestation efforts with species such as Khaya spp., Entandrophragma cylindricum, and Terminalia superba, with 95 hectares specifically designated for reforestation. The Babagulu Forest Reserve, spanning an area of 2,360 hectares along the Kisangani-Ituri road, primarily consists of Gilbertiodendron dewevrei.

L'Île Mbiye is located on the Congo River in the eastern part of Kisangani, upstream of the Wagenia Falls, with an altitude of 376 metres (1,234 ft). Adjacent to Kisangani, it is 14 km long and 4 km wide. Featuring a dense and relatively well-preserved forest, it is part of the Sustainable Forest Management in Africa Symposium project conducted by Stellenbosch University. The island, with an area of 1,400 hectares, comprises three types of forest: dry land forest, periodically flooded forest, and swampy forest.

=== Hydrology and geology ===
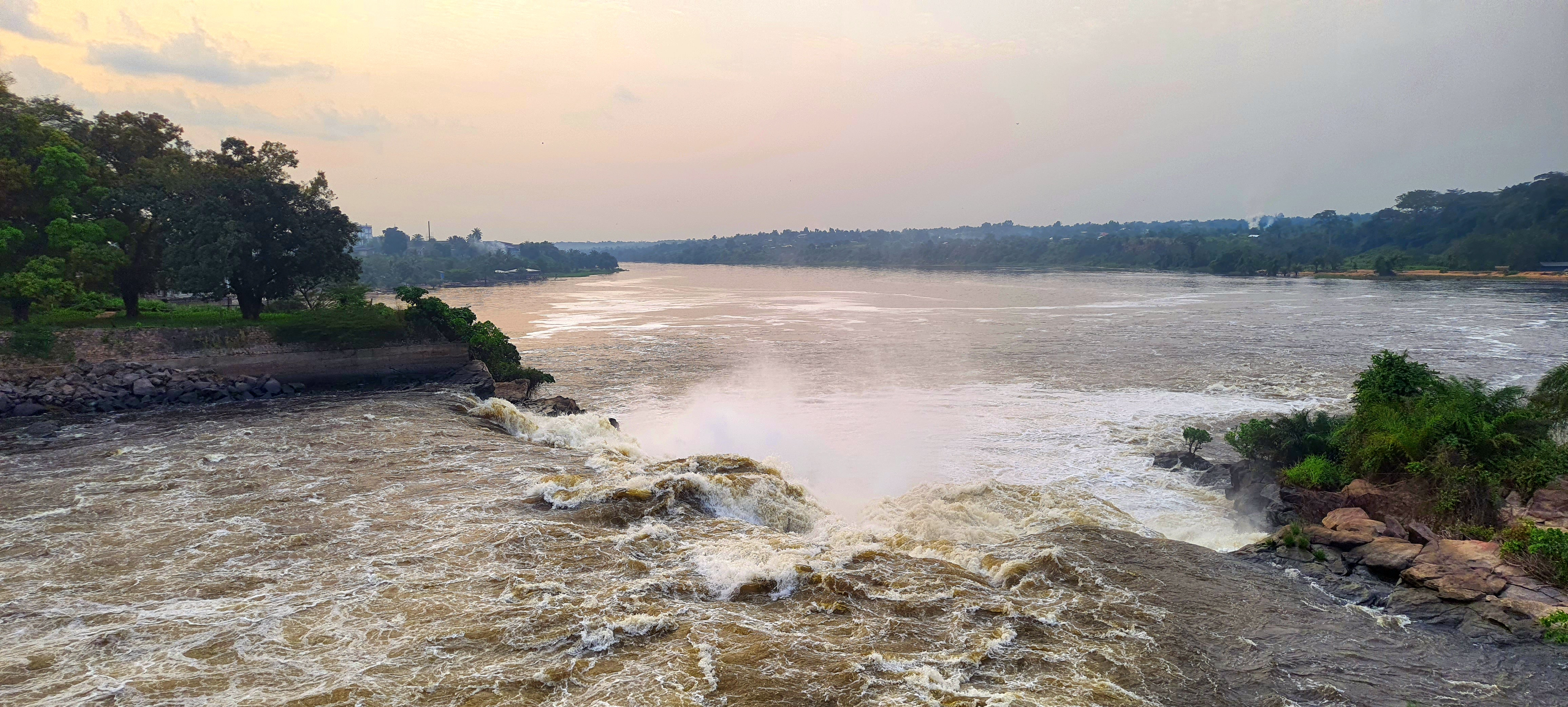
Cascades of the Tshopo River

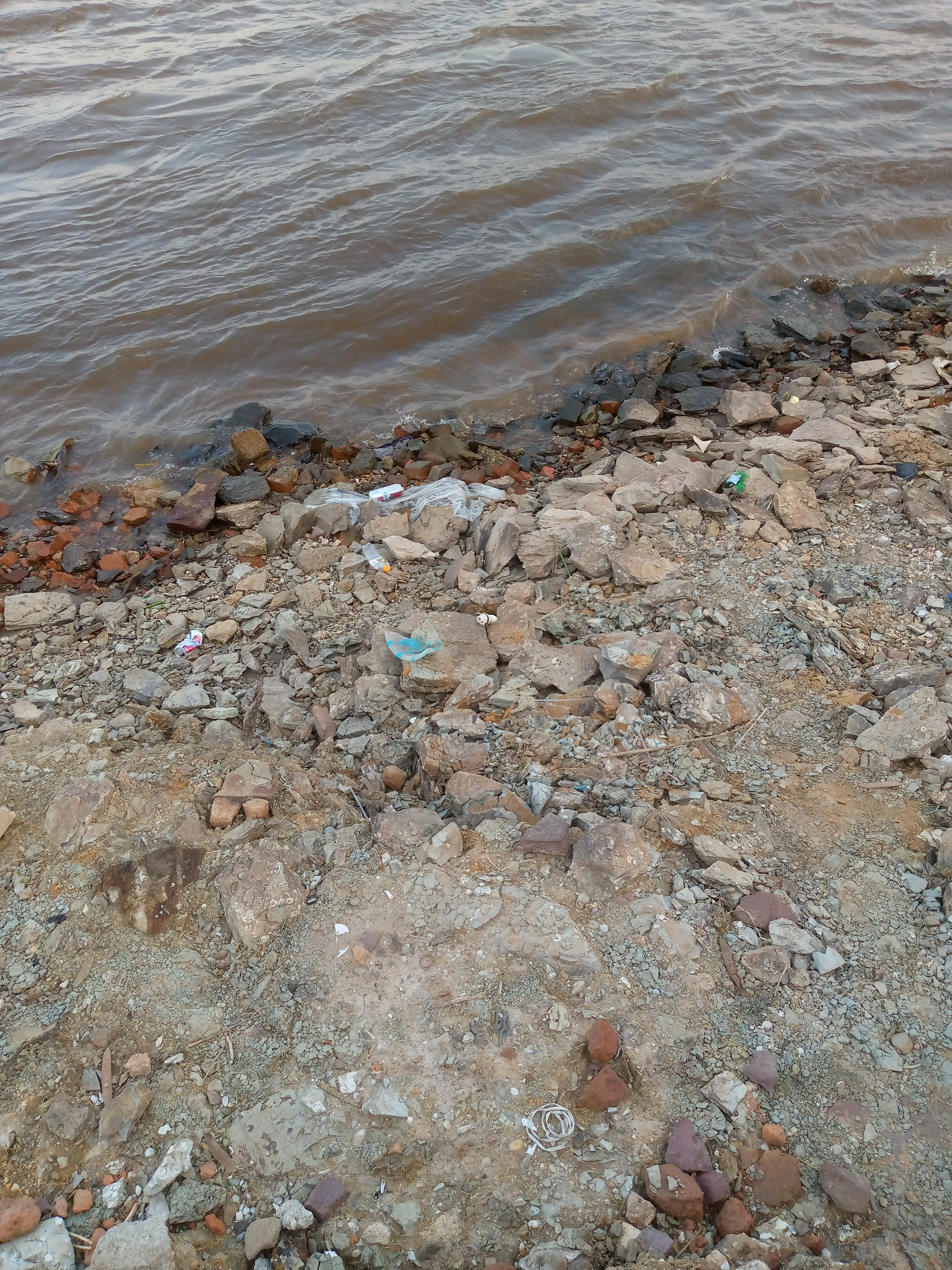
The edge of the Congo River in Kisangani after flood

The Lualaba River flows through a bend to a confluence with the Congo River; at the alteration of the waterways lies the city of Kisangani. Much of Kisangani City is built on land with the Tshopo River on its north and the Congo River on its south. Many tributaries and islands are intertwined, conducive to moving inland waterways. Tidal straits separate L'Île Mbiye from the mainland of Kisangani City. The seven cataracts have a total drop of 61 meters (200 feet). Wagenia Falls where the fishery is installed on the rapids can be seen.

The soil in Kisangani is typical of the central Congo Basin, characterised by red ochre ferralitic soils, also known as Ferralsols or Oxisols. These soils are known for their considerable thickness, red to yellow colouring, and acidic pH (less than 6). The low silica sesquioxide ratio of the clay fraction, coupled with a low cation exchange capacity and primary mineral content, results in a soil with low clay activity and soluble element content, yet exhibiting fairly good stability of aggregates.

=== Climate ===
Being close to the equator, the city has a tropical monsoon climate (Köppen Am), marginally missing the criterion for a tropical rainforest climate (Af), because its driest month (January) sees on average just below 60 millimetres or 2.4 inches of rain – a rainforest-like climate typical of the humid and wet Congo Rainforest. Humidity is high throughout the year, averaging 86%. Annual rainfall amounts to 1,620 millimetres (64 in) and occurs fairly regularly. Even in the driest month, the rainfall totals more than 53 millimetres (2.1 in).

Temperatures are uniformly high throughout the year due to its equatorial location, averaging around 25 °C or 77 °F, with little diurnal variability. Kisangani has a cool breeze that often blows off the Congo River.

Climate data for Kisangani
Month	Jan	Feb	Mar	Apr	May	Jun	Jul	Aug	Sep	Oct	Nov	Dec	Year
Record high °C (°F)	36 (97)	36 (97)	36 (97)	35 (95)	34 (93)	34 (93)	33 (91)	33 (91)	34 (93)	34 (93)	35 (95)	35 (95)	36 (97)
Mean daily maximum °C (°F)	31 (88)	31 (88)	31 (88)	31 (88)	31 (88)	30 (86)	29 (84)	28 (82)	29 (84)	30 (86)	29 (84)	30 (86)	30.0 (86.0)
Daily mean °C (°F)	26 (79)	26 (79)	26 (79)	26 (79)	26 (79)	25.5 (77.9)	24 (75)	24 (75)	24.5 (76.1)	25 (77)	24.5 (76.1)	25 (77)	25.2 (77.4)
Mean daily minimum °C (°F)	21 (70)	21 (70)	21 (70)	21 (70)	21 (70)	21 (70)	19 (66)	20 (68)	20 (68)	20 (68)	20 (68)	20 (68)	20.4 (68.7)
Record low °C (°F)	17 (63)	18 (64)	17 (63)	18 (64)	18 (64)	18 (64)	17 (63)	17 (63)	17 (63)	18 (64)	18 (64)	16 (61)	16 (61)
Average rainfall mm (inches)	53 (2.1)	84 (3.3)	178 (7.0)	158 (6.2)	137 (5.4)	114 (4.5)	132 (5.2)	165 (6.5)	183 (7.2)	218 (8.6)	198 (7.8)	84 (3.3)	1,620 (63.8)
Mean monthly sunshine hours	187	170	187	180	187	150	124	125	150	186	150	155	1,951
Source: BBC Weather Centre

=== Architecture ===
Modern, multi-storey buildings of brick emerge from the dense walls of the vast Congo Basin jungle. Multiple kinds and scales of houses, townhouses, condominia, and apartment buildings can be found in Kisangani. The building form most closely associated with Kisangani is of Belgium influence, whose introduction and widespread adoption in colonial times saw Kisangani's buildings shift from the thatch African tradition to the low-scale and vertical rise of European business districts.

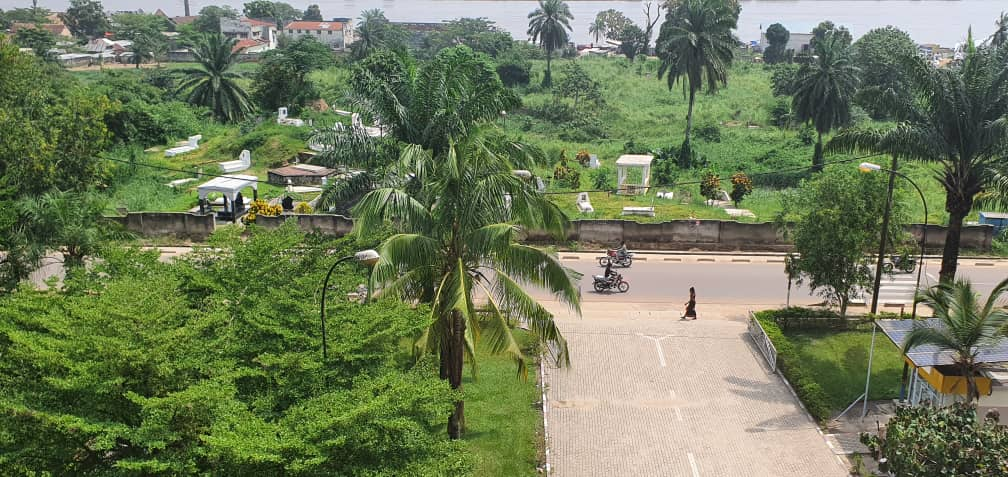
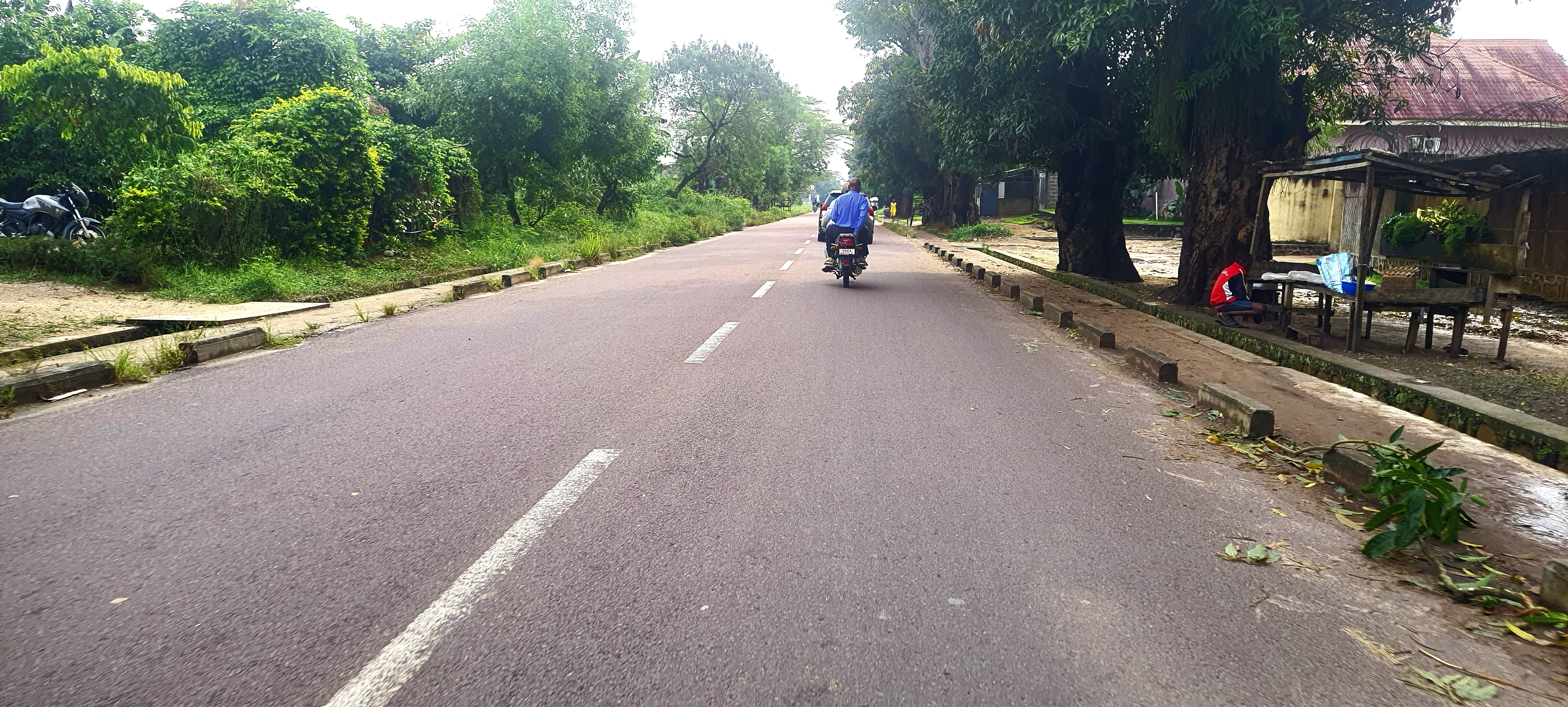
The main road to Simi-Simi Airport

Kisangani has architecturally significant buildings in a wide range of styles still in their original form. These include the Aumonerie which is distinctive for its facade using visible stone-tone to evoke the building's structure, the impressive 20th century headquarters landmark that is Central Prisons' with its towering fortress walls, Cathédrale Notre-Dame du Rosaire, an early cathedral revival built with massively scaled stone detailing, and the Congo Palace Hotel on avenue de l'eglise is an important example of highly influential European style buildings in Kisangani.

The character of Kisangani's urban residential districts is often defined by the elegant villas with tiled roofs of old Belgian influence, brownstone rowhouses, townhouses, and tenements that were built during a period of rapid expansion from 1908 to 1950. Large swaths of Kisangani's rural residential areas away from the city centre are characterized by continual strings of villages unfolding, each composed of thatched roof tops built from the early 20th century through to the present day. At times the path is filled with a sweet floral fragrance and clouded with white and purple butterflies. Forests give way to patches of grassland, then clumps of bamboo and then more forest.

=== Communes ===
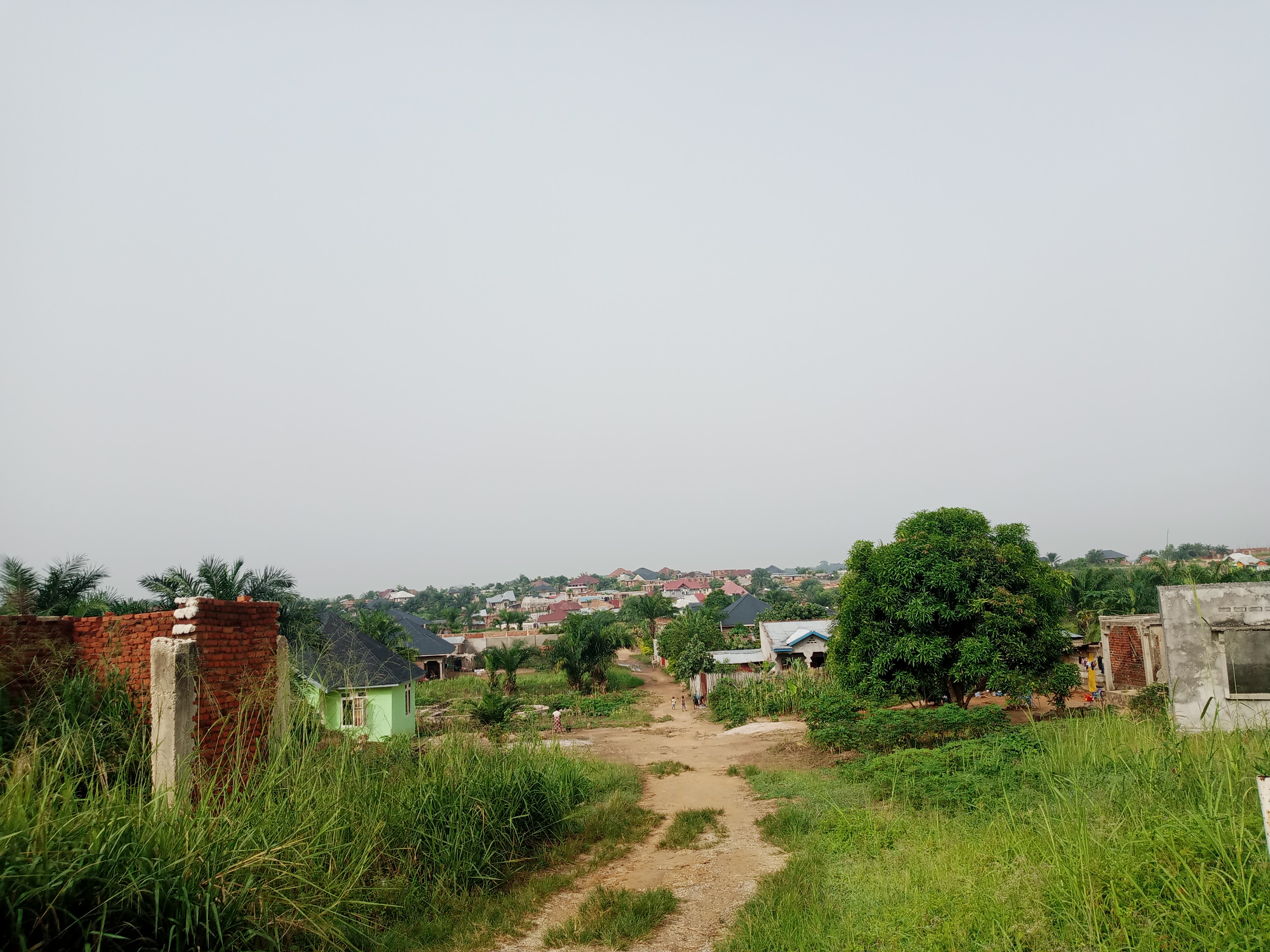
Houses in Motumbé district, Kisangani

The city of Kisangani is composed of six large communes, which are subdivided into smaller neighbourhoods. The partitioned communes are Lubunga, Makiso, Kisangani, Tshopo, Kabondo and Mangobo. Throughout the boroughs there are hundreds of distinct neighbourhoods, many with a definable history and character to call their own. Every municipality in the city has a nickname denoting how the Boyoma perceive their cities.

Kisangani, which in Swahili means on the island (Kisanga translates to island and ni is on), is officially given the nickname of "City of Hope" by administrative authorities, in opposition to the title of martyred city. Boyomas' affectionately nicknamed their city "Boyoma Singa Mwambé", which translates as "before reaching the most beautiful city the pole must be thrown 8 times". Boyoma means the most beautiful girl, while Singa is the mast and Mwambé is the number 8.

- Kisangani commune is commonly referred to as "Tolimo" in Kigenyi, mainly due to the craft of scaffolds installed on Wagenia Falls.
- Mangobo is the city's most populous commune and is known as "Mathématique" because of the difficulty in locating particular street address names that are simply manuscript numbered rather than word labelled. The commune is home to the political youth movement the "Bana Etats-Unis" (Children of the United States).
- Tshopo is Kisangani City's northernmost commune, it features a long beachfront. It is home to a hydroelectric plant and the site of Tshopo River.
- Makiso is the most densely populated borough and home to many of the city's commercial and financial institutions. The commune contains the headquarters of many major corporations, NGOs, International organisations, the United Nations, as well as a number of important administrative structures of governorship, and many cultural attractions. It is the site of a continuous supply of electricity with some of the most beautiful houses and of the widest boulevards. Makiso is as known as "Miroir".
- Lubunga is the most suburban commune in character of the Six communes. Ascribed the nickname of "Pays" it supplies Kisangani with most of its agricultural crops.
- Kabondo is the commune that usually takes lead in annually hosting some of the city's largest parades and public events mainly due to its cultural and social and ethnic diversity, an independent art scene, distinct neighborhoods and unique architectural heritage. As a result, Kabondo is known as "Pilote".

== Culture ==
Kisangani is a centre for television productions, radio, theatre, film, multimedia and print publishing. Kisangani's many cultural communities have given it a distinct local culture. The city's waterfront allure and nightlife has attracted residents and tourists alike. As a Central African city, Kisangani shares many cultural characteristics with the rest of the continent. It has a tradition of producing African jazz, Congolese rumba, soukous, African folk, and ndombolo music.

Kisangani has produced people in the fields of visual arts, theatre, music, and dance. Some of its popular culture residents include Abeti Masikini, Anne-Sylvie Mouzon, Anzor Alem, Barly Baruti, Koffi Olomide and Moreno. Kisangani is at the African confluence of the South and the North and West and East traditions.

Kisangani has a vibrant downtown, particularly during summer, with cultural and social events, particularly festivals. The city's largest festival is the Cercle Boyoma Culture festival, which is the largest in the world of its kind. Other popular festivals include the Kisangani Jazz Festival, Kisangani Film Festival, Nuits d'Afrique and the Kisangani Fireworks Festival.

=== Entertainment and performing arts ===
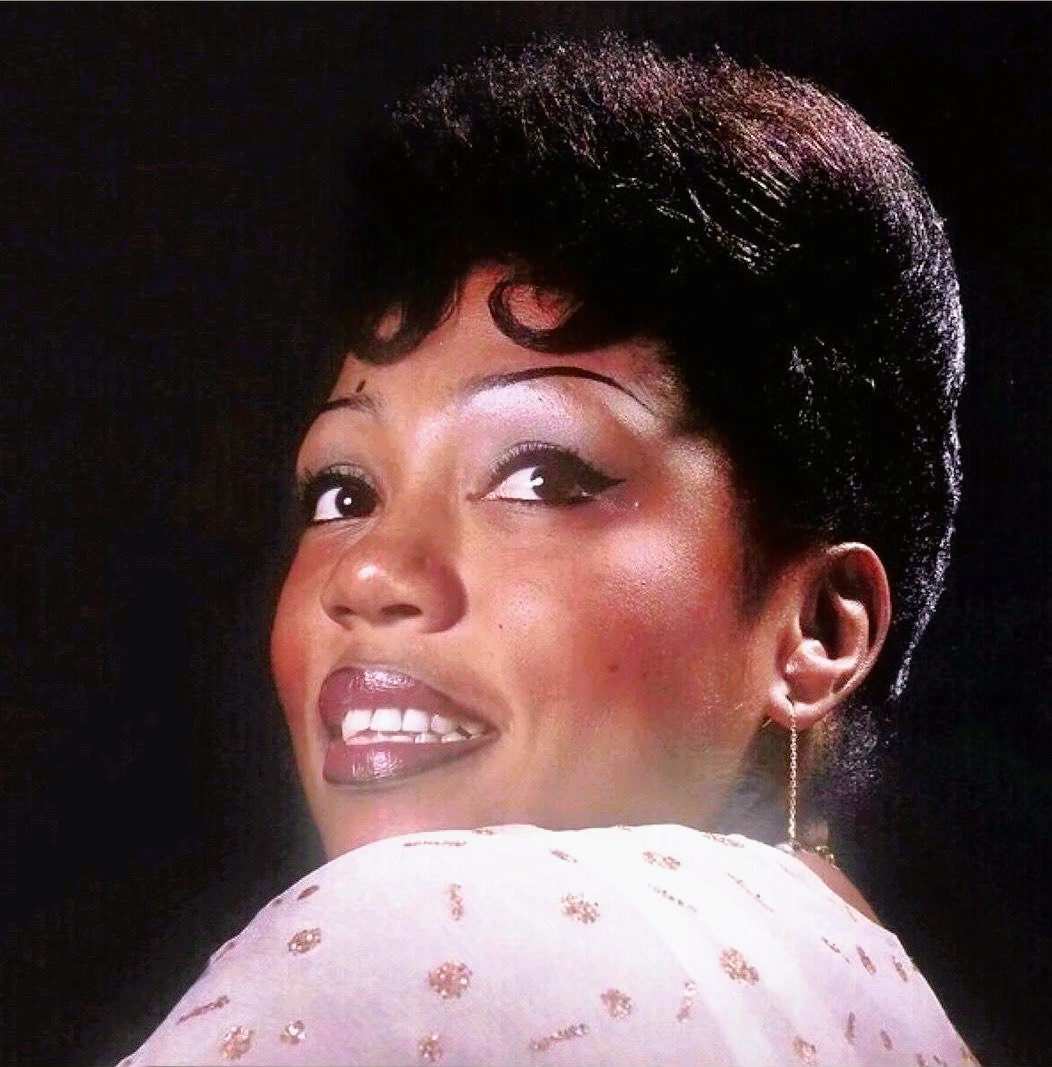
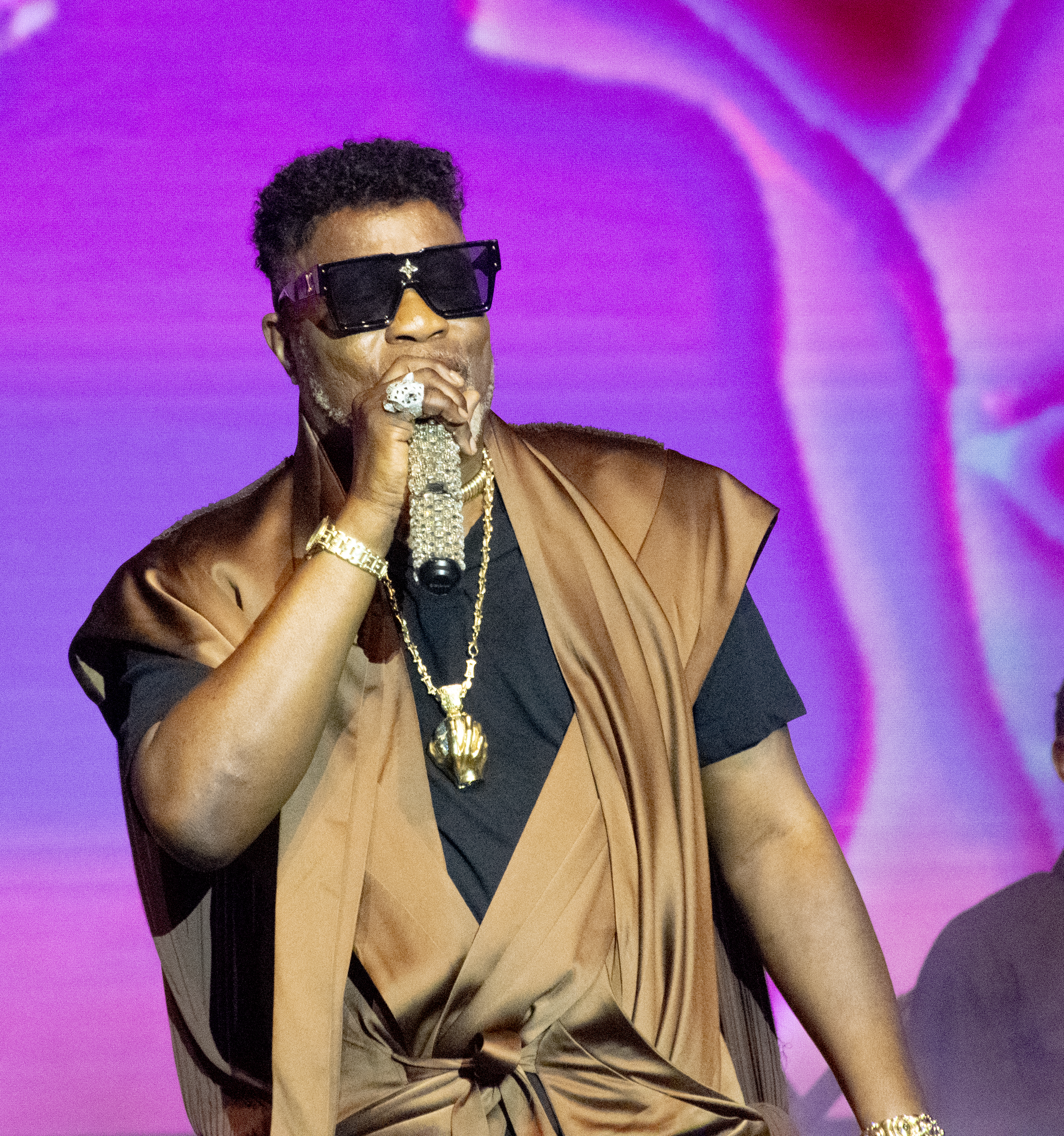
Abeti Masikini (left) and Koffi Olomide (right), significant figures in 20th-century Congolese and African popular music, were both born in Kisangani.

Strongly influenced by the city's immigrants, productions such as those of Barly Baruti and others used song in narratives that often reflected themes of hope and ambition. Artists of all cultural disciplines in Kisangani such as musicians, stage actors, comedians, fashion, cultural operators, draftsmen, folk music, painters, sculptors, and silkscreen meet annually for the seasonal culture shows. Cercle Boyoma Culture is one of such shows where cultural activities of Kisangani come together synergistically for an exchange and reflection involving different associations of all cultural disciplines. Cercle Boyoma Culture is annually held in Makiso on 14 Fina Avenue from the month of December through to June. The culture show displays a digital audio recording studio, a large stage show, 10 booths that host libraries, internet cafes, sewing stations, interactive gaming machines and cafeterias.

The cultural space in Kisangani provides multitudes of beauty pageants a platform to exchange experiences, provide mentoring consultation and hosting of training seminars. Miss Boyoma is annually held in December, organized by the cities' authority to determine the most beautiful girl in Kisangani.

Other live music genres which are part of the city's cultural heritage include Kisangani Blues, Kisangani Soul, African Jazz, soukous and gospel. The city is the birthplace of Congolese legendary musicians Abeti Masikini and Koffi Olomide and is the site of an influential nu-rumba scene. In the 1950s, the city was a center for African Folk, soukous and African jazz. This influence continued into the more developed soukous of the 1960s. The city has been an epicenter for Ndombolo culture since the 1990s. A flourishing independent folk music culture brought forth Kisangani Blues. The city has also been spawning a critically acclaimed underground nu-rumba scene with various bands gaining national attention in the nu-rumba world. Annual festivals feature various acts such as the Cercle Boyoma Culture Festival.

Kisangani is the birthplace of well-known choreographer and stage director Faustin Linyekula. In 2007, the Studios Kabako, a cultural organization he established in Kinshasa in 2001, relocated to Kisangani. Since then, the Studios Kabako have supported the development of young Congolese artists in dance, theatre, music, and video, providing training, production, and touring opportunities. Notable young dancers and choreographers who emerged from the Studios Kabako include Jeannot Kumbonyeki, Michel Kiyombo, Dorine Mokha, Djino Alolo, and Yves Mwamba. Kisangani is also home to the only professional recording studio in the eastern DRC, where musicians such as guitarist Flamme Kapaya, rap artists Pasnas, Franck Moka, Shoggy, and Pépé Lecoq have recorded. Additionally, the city is the hometown of filmmaker Dieudo Hamadi.

=== Tourism ===
Shopping along the avenue de l'Eglise, its many restaurants, as well as Kisangani's eminent architecture, continue to draw tourists. The city is the DRC's third-largest convention destination. Most conventions are held at Stade Lumumba, just north of Stade du Marche. The historic City Hall also now houses the city's Visitor Information Center, galleries and exhibit halls. The Alliance Franco-Congolese (AFRACO) building which hosts governmental conference.

The variety of attractions in Kisangani include botanical gardens, museums, factories, zoos, exhibition halls, elevators, retail stores, breweries, warehouses, libraries, mills, auditoriums and refineries which today provide a legacy of historic and architectural interest, especially in the downtown area.

Rosaire of Notre-Dame Cathedral, Central Market and the impressive 19th century headquarters of all major Kisangani banks on 1st Avenue. Kisangani holds a campus of the National University of the Congo, which includes the renowned Medicine Faculty, also known because of the refuted oral polio vaccine AIDS hypothesis. Kisangani also maintains the city's focal library at University of Kisangani. The city holds an extensive collection of ancient Congolese and near East African archaeological artifacts, at its regional archaeological and ethnological, the National Museum of Kisangani.

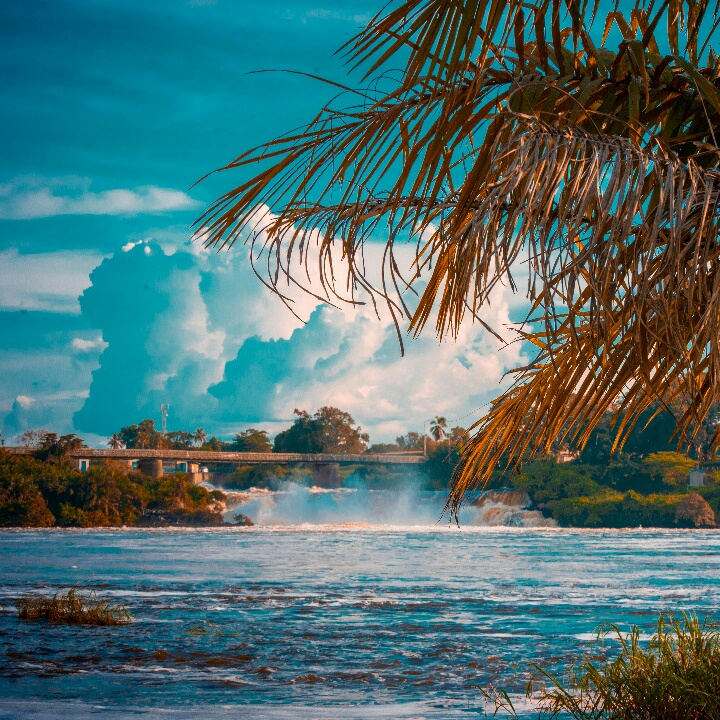
The Tshopo II Bridge, built in 2014, alongside the Boyoma Falls in Kisangani, as viewed from the Kisangani Zoological Garden (Jardin Zoologique de Kisangani)

Other landmarks include: L'Hôtel des chutes, Le Voyageur, Hellénique ainsi que Psistaria, l'Hôtel Congo Palace, l'Hôtel Boyoma, l'Hôtel Kisanganian and L'Hôtel Palm Beach. Place de la Femme which was completed in 1934 as a dedication to Boyomaise women, the landmark One of the most revered religious leaders Reverend Father Gabriel Grison was buried at the Mission St. Gabriel in Kisangani and has monument dedicated to him on Monseigneur Grison Avenue. Mobutu's residential home on route de Lubutu, Place des Martyrs that held the Lumumba Square until 1967, the controversial Central Public Fountain that anchors the downtown park was installed by the distraction of the popular monument of Stanley and its surrounding structures are but a few notable examples of 20th-century architecture.

On the right bank of the Tshopo River, the Kisangani Zoo attracts many visitors, as well as the Kisangani Hydroelectric Dam that supplies electricity to the city of Kisangani. At spectacular waterfall of Wagenia Falls, fishing with the old age tradition tools installed on the rapids can be witnessed. Fishing is practised through a scaffold installed among rocks, with vines attached and serving through the tensioning creels of woven conical vines immersed in the current of the river.

A major destination includes the forest ecosystem of L'Île Mbiye, which is part of a protection conservation forest program called Sustainable Forest Management in Africa as spearheaded by Stellenbosch University. L'Île Mbiye is an ecosystem with a well preserved dense forest. The Island has an area of 1,400 ha, and it comprises three types of forest: dry land forest, periodically flooded forest and swampy forest. The Island is situated on the Congo River in the eastern part of Kisangani. It is located upstream of the Wagenia Falls, between latitude 0°31' North and longitude 25°11' East, with 376 m of altitude. It adjoins the town of Kisangani, and it is 14 km long and 4 km wide.

=== Cuisine ===
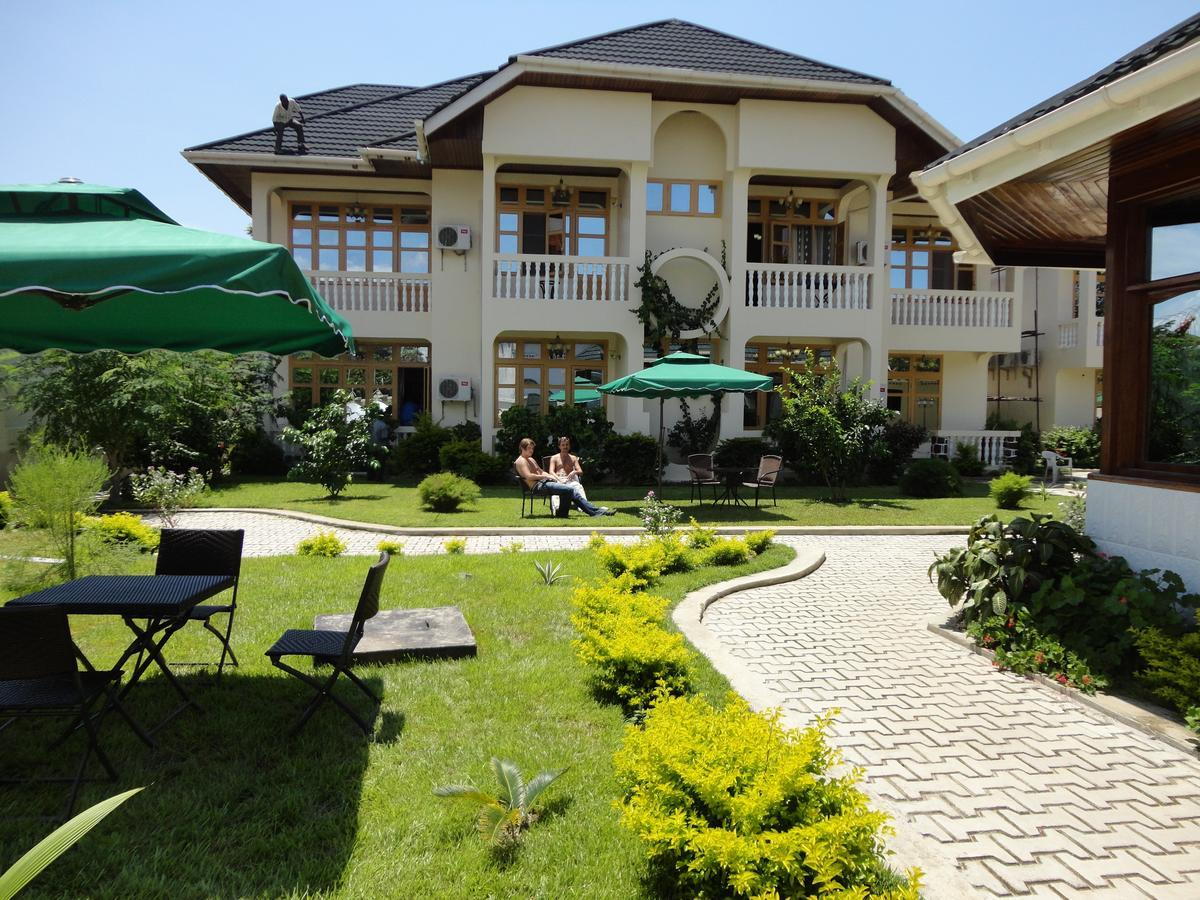
The Centre d'Accueil Ruwenzori hotel in Kisangani

Kisangani lays claim to a large number of regional specialties, all of which reflect the city's ethnic and working-class roots. Included among these is its nationally renowned deep-dish manioc.

Kisangani's food culture, influenced by the city's immigrants and large number of dining patrons, is diverse. Arab-Swahili and Indian immigrants have made the city famous for their traditional foods. Some of the mobile food vendors licensed by the city have made foods such as husking paddy standbys of contemporary Kisangani street food, although kosa kosa (prawns from the river, also known as cossa cossa) and Kisangani coffee are still the main street fare. The city is also home to many of the finest prawn cuisine restaurants in the Democratic Republic of the Congo (DRC).

=== Media ===
Kisangani is served by a variety of media outlets, including several Swahili, Lingala and French language television stations, newspapers, radio stations, and magazines. There are four over-the-air Swahili and Lingala-language television stations and they also air multicultural programming. There are also five over-the-air French-language television stations, including: Radio Télévision Nationale Congolaise (RTNC), Télé Boyoma and Radio Télévision Amani (RTA).

Kisangani has four daily newspapers, in Swahili and Lingala language Kisangani Gazette and the French-language Mungongo, La Tshopo, Le Thermomètre, Agence de Presse Congolaise and Kisangani. There are also two free French dailies, Nationaliste and Kisanga. Kisangani also has numerous weekly tabloids and community newspapers serving various neighborhoods and schools. Mungongo is produced by young journalists of Université de Kisangani at the Faculty of Arts, with supervision of the news agency Syfia Great Lakes.

There are 11 AM and 23 FM radio stations in Kisangani. Of these13 broadcast in French, 16 broadcast in multiple languages and three stations are bilingual. The major Kisangani station networks include: Radio-Télévision Numérique Boyoma (RTNB), OPED FM and Radio Okapi. All three networks broadcast in Lingala, French and Swahili. OPED FM specializes in environmental issues and is headquartered in Kisangani. OPED is acronym for l'Organisation pour la Protection de l'Environnement et le Développement. OPED FM broadcasts can be heard in Germany through radio Deutsche Welle. RTNB has niche prioritises business coverage of financial markets. The station works in partnership with Radio Télévision Belge Francophone (RTBF) and Radio Africa n°1. Programs of the two stations regularly broadcast in Kisangani.

Kisangani is a filming-friendly location. Since the 1920s, many motion pictures have been filmed in the city, most notably The Nun's Story.

=== Sports ===
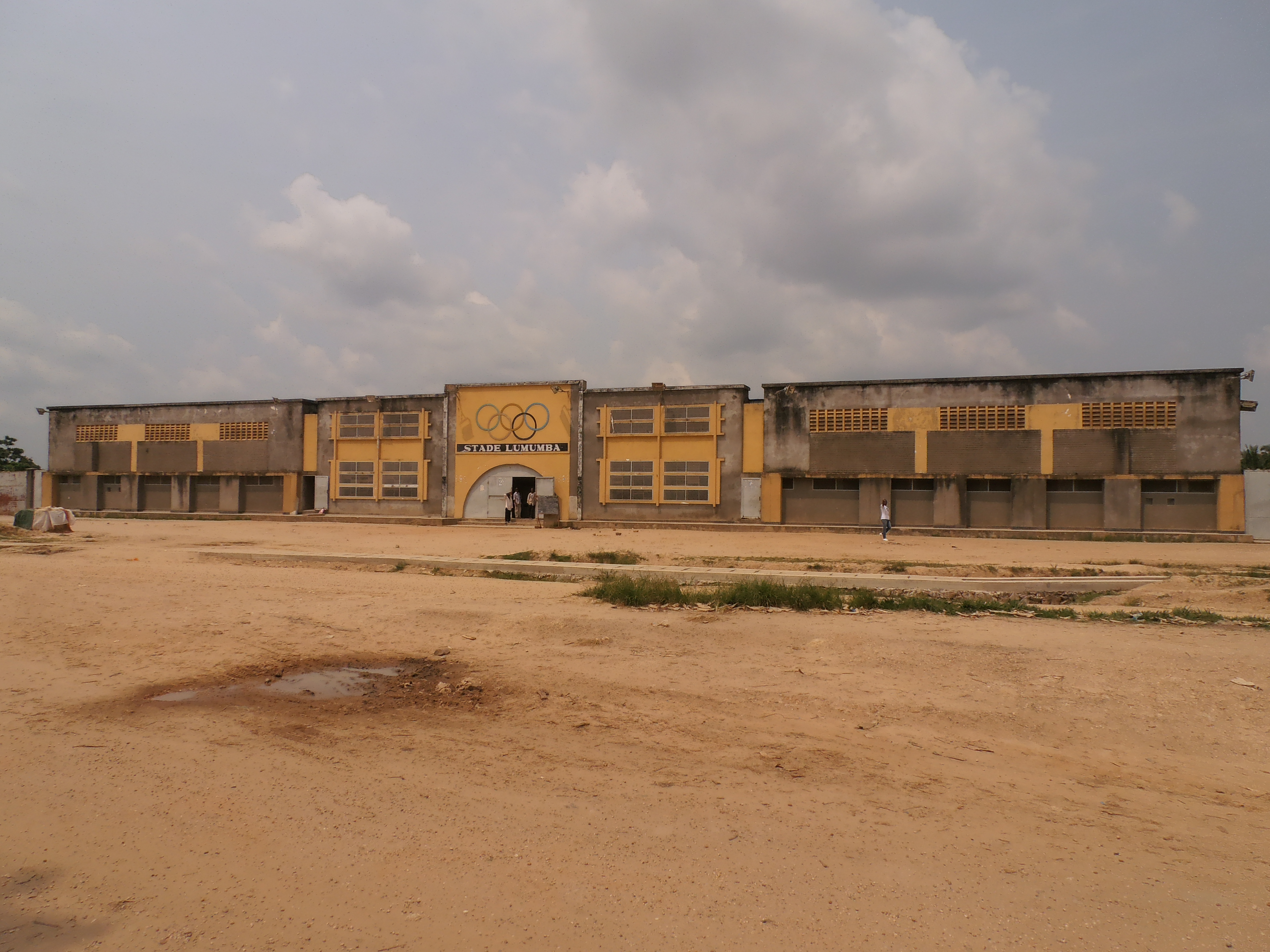
Stade Lumumba

Sports of all kinds play an important part in many Boyomai's lives. The city of Kisangani is home to several stadiums with the 3 main stadiums being Stade Lumumba, Stade du Marche and the Stade of Athenee Royal.

The city is represented in Nationwide Football League Linafoot by TS Malekesa, RC Etoile d' and AS NIKA in the 2009/2010 season. They both play their home games at a soccer-specific stadium called Stade Lumumba.

Kisangani is also represented in Province Oriental Provincial League by, CS Makiso, Sotexki SC, RC Stella, AS Kisangani, RC Boyoma, Echo Sport, CS Monami, FC Procure, AS Vita Boyoma and AS Pars. They draw packed crowds at the small but picturesque Stade of Athenee Royal for their regular-season games. The current president of the Kisangani Football Association the Entente Urbaine of Football in Kisangani (EUFKIS) is Anaclet Kanangila who succeeded to the post left by Robert Kabemba.

Retired boxer Biko Botowamungu is originally from Kisangani.

== Economy ==
Kisangani's economy is the one largest of cities in the Congo Basin and is the largest in the former Orientale province. It's an intricate hub of business and commerce and is one of three "command centers" for the Congolese economy (along with Kinshasa and Lubumbashi). Before the country gained independence from Belgium in 1960, Kisangani was reputed to have more Rolls-Royces per capita than any other city in the world. It flourished because of the many Boyoman who prospered during a boom in coffee, cotton and rubber production late in the colonial era, when those commodities still fetched high prices.

Strategically positioned and central on a geographical map of the continent of Africa, at the confluence of the Lualaba River and Congo River, Kisangani is the inception and terminus point of river traffic between east and west of DR Congo, playing a major economic role in the '5 Chantiers' economic recovery and redevelopment of the Democratic Republic of the Congo (DRC). The city is today an important centre of commerce, finance, industry, metallurgy, panning, real estate, hydro industries, agriculture, breweries, technology, culture, media, and arts.

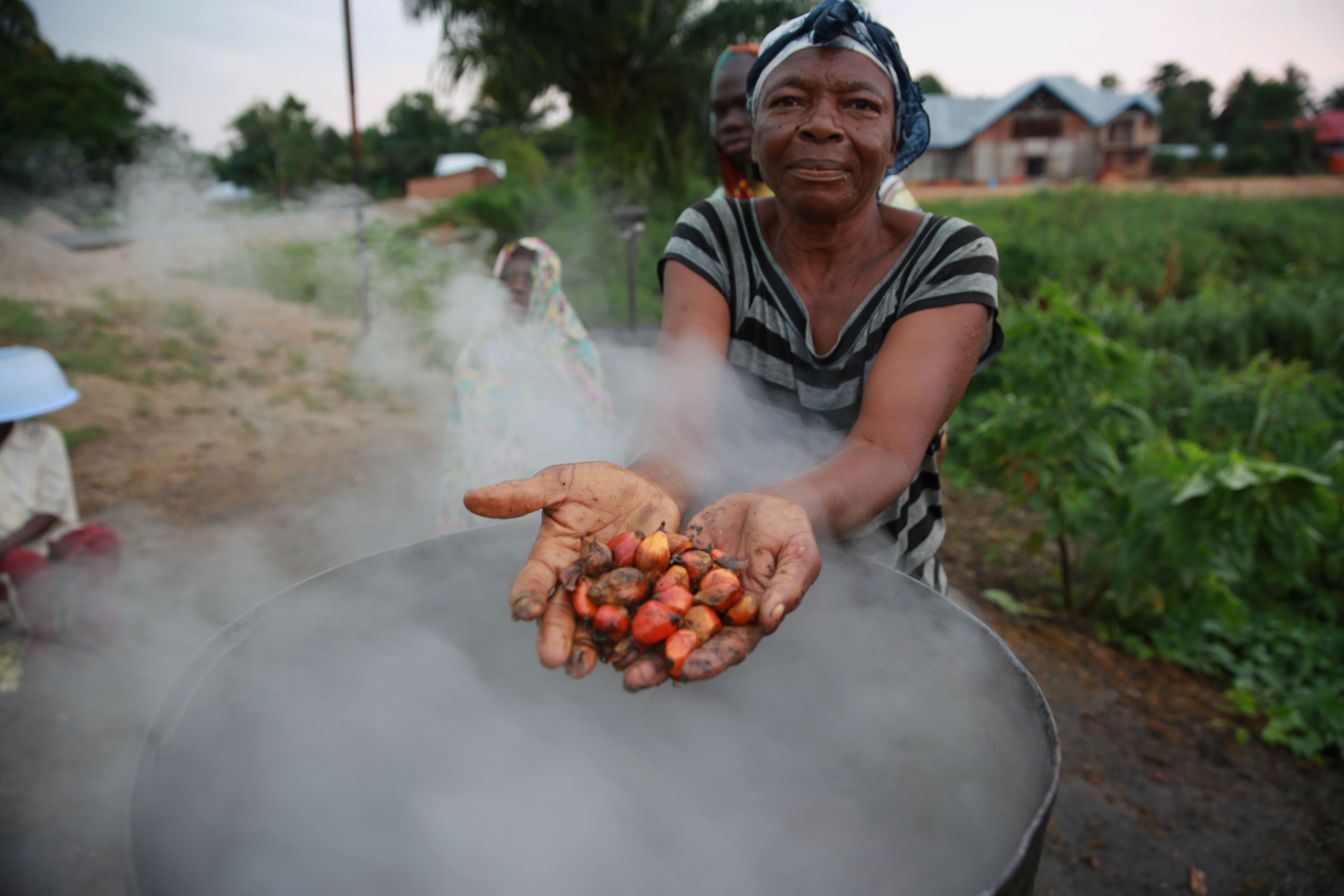
A woman prepares palm oil used for food consumption and soap production.

One of Africa's great trading centres; Kisangani's strengths in its transportation system have contributed to the development of the city. SOTEXKI, the Textile Society of Kisangani produces fabrics and manufactures clothing, while Bralima produces beverages, REGIDESO treats and supplies water to the population, SORGERIE (Société de Gestion, de Gérance et d'Investissement), produces soaps, vegetable oils and other cosmetic products. Compagnie Forestière de Transformation (CFT) is the firm that process and exports African teak. Pharmaceuticals, printed material, food processing, telecommunications, textile and clothing manufacturing, tobacco and transportation, also play major roles in the city's economy. The service sector is strong and includes civil, mechanical and process engineering, finance, higher education, and also research and development.

The forest island of Mbiye is one of the natural ecosystems in Kisangani that play a leading economic role with regard to the supply of food, medicines and building material, in which is of critical importance to the survival of plant life, wildlife and human populations.

Realising the importance of the biosphere and preservation of the forests biodiversity: "Forty million Congolese depend in one way or another for their survival on the Congo forest" says Stephan Van Praet of Greenpeace, who coordinated the research for the report, entitled Carving up the Congo. "I can assure you they know the value of their forests. If you cut the sapele trees you take away the caterpillars they rely on as a source of protein."

L'Île Mbiye in Kisangani is part of the Sustainable Forest Management in Africa Symposium project of forest ecosystem conservation conducted by Stellenbosch University. Democratic Republic of the Congo (DRC) is also looking to expand the area of forest under protection, for which it hopes to secure compensation through emerging markets for forest carbon.

The Port of Piroguiers is the largest inland port in the DRC, after the nation's capital Kinshasa, handling million tonnes of cargo annually. As one of the most important ports in DRC, it remains a trans-shipment point link Kinshasa to the North-Eastern provinces for grain, sugar, petroleum products, machinery, and consumer goods. For this reason, Kisangani is a railway hub of DRC and has always been an extremely important rail city; it is home to the headquarters of Société Nationale des Chemins de Fer du Congo. Since the resumption of road traffic between Kisangani and its eastern cities, the markets of the city are regularly supplied and export food from and to Beni, Bunia and Butembo.

The city's television and film industry is among the largest in the country. Creative industries such as new media, advertising, fashion, design and architecture account for a growing share of employment, with Kisangani City possessing a strong competitive advantage in these industries. Other important sectors include medical research and technology, non-profit institutions, and universities.

Kisangani's informal sector is highly developed. Its composed of handicrafts, local brick manufactures, merchants close to the banks of the river that sell a variety of edible products (like prawns, kosa kosa and caterpillars), others engage in artisanal quarrying, ceramics, coffee growing, Jeweller dealing, producing cultural artifacts, precious metals goldsmithing or subsistence farming.

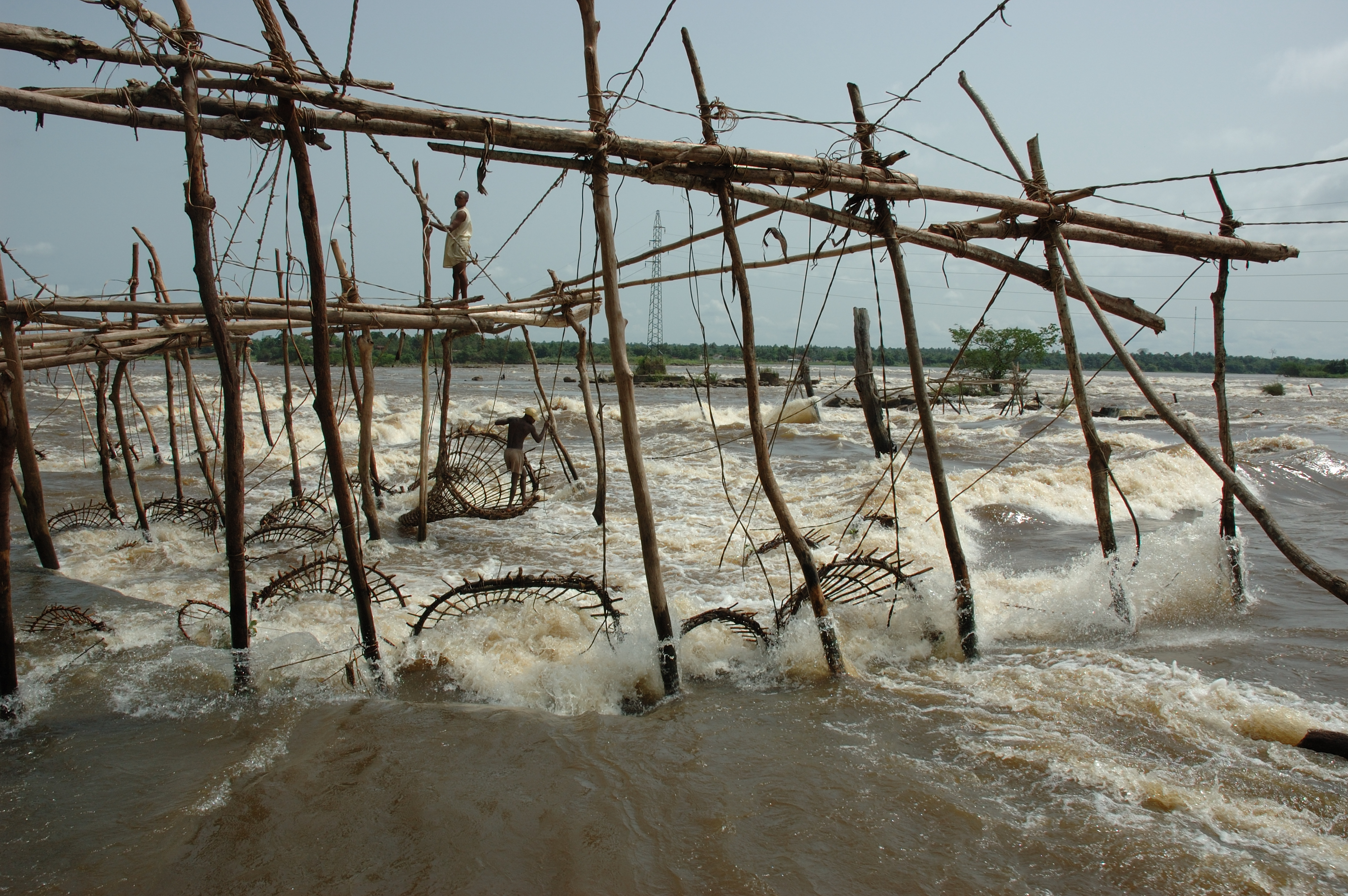
Wagenya fishermen in the Boyoma Falls of Kisangani

Manufacturing accounts for a large share of employment. Garments, chemicals, metal products, processed foods, and furniture are some of the principal products. Most of the food products derived from rural areas whose main activities are agriculture and livestock include kosa kosa and prawns, which are exported to all major cities of the DRC. The Wagenia, whom mostly fish the rapids of the famous Wagenia Falls on the Congo River are known for the possession of excellent fishing skills. The food-processing industry is a stable major manufacturing sector in the city. Chocolate is Kisangani's leading specialty-food export, with imports of cocoa from nearby Kabinda District.

During the holidays, the young people enjoy the school holidays by engaging in part-time jobs, learning earlier on how to earn money and gaining family budgetary skills, thus adding to the family income. The children are likely to open up small vending businesses, of which the services offered may include selling boiled eggs, cooking oil or operating shoeshine stores, to name a few. Many parents believe that part-time work helps children to become more independent as well as providing them (and sometimes their families) with some extra income.

== Demographics ==
During its first century, Kisangani grew at a rate that ranked among the fastest growing in the Belgian Congo. Within the span of forty years, the city's population grew from slightly under 15,018 to over 121,765 by 1958. By the close of the 20th century, Kisangani was the third largest city in Zaire, and the largest of the cities that existed in the former Orientale province. Within thirty-three years of Zaire as a nation, the population had tripled to over 600,000, and reached its highest ever-recorded population of 672,739 for the 2003 census.

The population is ethnically diverse and is changing rapidly, especially in large cities such as Kisangani, so it is not always easy to get an exact picture of the ethnic origin of all the population from census statistics. The last census in 2003 counted almost 672 739 inhabitants in the city of Kisangani. Lubunga is the town's most populous but least dense with 115 775 inhabitants while Mangobo with 98 434 inhabitants is the most dense.

Demography has evolved as follows since colonial times:

Historical population
Year	1958	1970	1984	1993	2004	2007
Pop.	121,726	216,526	317,581	406,249	682,599	628,367
±%	—	+77.9%	+46.7%	+27.9%	+68.0%	−7.9%

Kisangani is the most populous city of the Northern provinces in the DRC, with an estimated 2008 population of 1,200,000 (up from 406,249 thousand in 1993). This amounts to about more than half the population of the northern regional population lives in the province of Tshopo. Over the last decade the city's population has been increasing.

=== Historical populations ===
In 1905, there were a total of eleven stations and stations of the state in the area of Stanley Falls and Stanleyville. The total number of state officials increased to 40.

In 1909, the European Stanleyville numbered 80 and the native population was estimated at 15,000 people within a radius of 5 kilometres (3.1 mi).

At the time, the sprawling population in 1918 required the District Commissioner to create a daily food market in Kisangani, near the Hospital Avenue, 1 kilometre (0.62 mi) from shore. Two more weekly markets were also created on the other side, one near the docks and another at CFL Mission St. Gabriel. The population in the 1920s increased to 4,000 Africans and 200 Europeans, with an average of 2,000 inhabitants moving around downtown Stanleyville (in the chiefdom Arabized).

The population of Stanleyville, in the early 1950s, stood at 40,000 and by the late 1950s the population reached 70,000.

=== Ethnicities ===
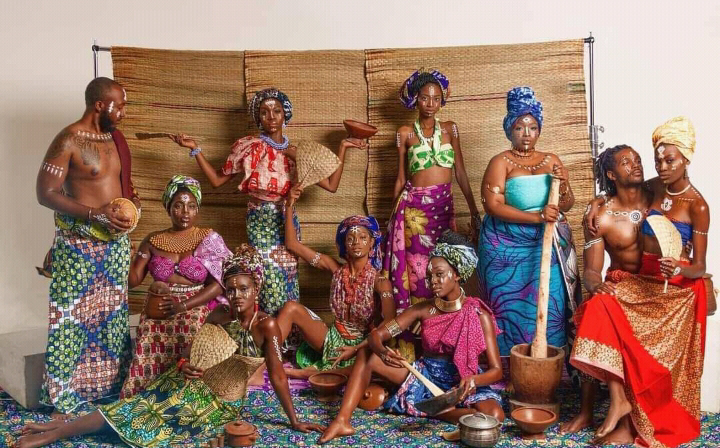
A traditional wedding custom in Kisangani

The population of Kisangani is exceptionally diverse. Throughout its history the city has been a major melting pot of entry for immigrants. Today, some of the city's population has foreign ancestry and among Congolese cities, this proportion is exceeded only by Kinshasa and Lubumbashi. In Kisangani no single community or region of origin dominates.

Some of the many African ethnic groups in Kisangani are: Bamanga, Popoi, Boa, Lokele, Turumbu, Mbole, Kumu, Wagenia, Rega, Topoke, Lokele, Turumbu, Basoko, Lendu, Budu, Bangetu, Logo, Alur, Hema, Azande and Yira ethnic group also have a notable presence. Non-African ethnic groups include many Flemings of Belgian origin. There are also small groups of Greeks, Chinese, Walloons, Indians and, lately, Lebanese.

The city has a heterogeneous population of over 250 ethnic African majorities of which Wagenia and Kumu compose the native population:

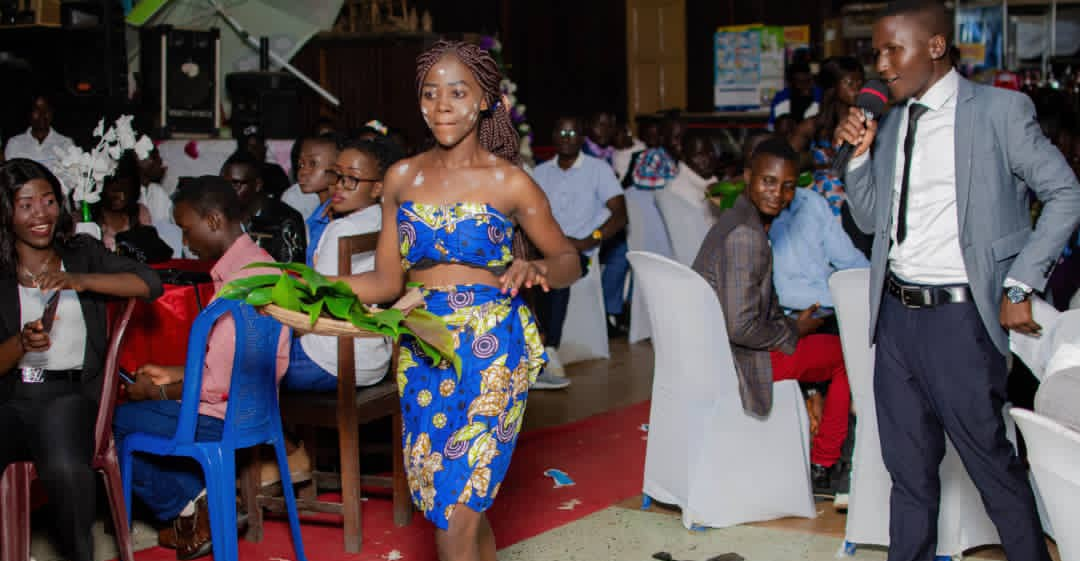
- Cultural activities in Kisangani showcase local traditions and community celebrations.
  In the north of the city of the Tshopo Commune, reside the Bamanga, Popoi, Boa that emigrated all the way from Buta.
- To the south of the city live the population groups of the Lokele, Turumbu, Mbole, Kumu, Wagenia and Rega, in the Lubunga Commune. Some arrived from the province of Maniema by the way of Ubundu road and rail, as well as the Opala road and the river toward the neighbouring territory of Isangi.
- Towards the west in the Commune of Mangobo, lie the Topoke, Lokele, Turumbu and Basoko, whom emigrated through the Congo River and Tshopo River, which divides the city into two banks of Tshopo.
- To the east of the city in the commune of Kabondo, is home to the Lendu, Budu, Bangetu, Logo, Alur, Hema, Nande, Yira, whom arrived Kisangani the Ituri road in Bunia.

=== Language ===
French is the official language of the DR Congo (DRC) and widely used and understood. Common local languages in Kisangani include Lingala, Pa-Zande and Swahili.

=== Religion ===
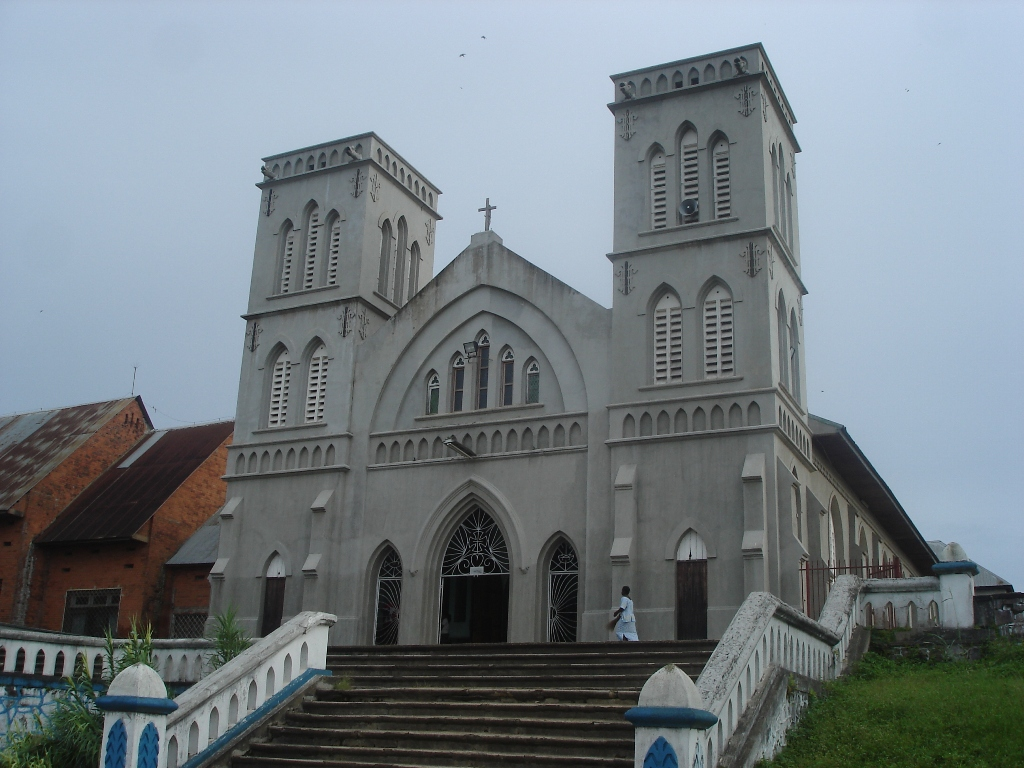
Our Lady of the Rosary Cathedral, Kisangani

Among the places of worship, they are predominantly Christian churches and temples: Roman Catholic Archdiocese of Kisangani (Catholic Church), Kimbanguist Church, Baptist Community of Congo (Baptist World Alliance), Baptist Community of the Congo River (Baptist World Alliance), Assemblies of God, Province of the Anglican Church of the Congo (Anglican Communion), Presbyterian Community in Congo (World Communion of Reformed Churches). There are also Muslim mosques.

=== Boyoma Kisanganien(sis) ===
- Abeti Masikini
- Anne-Sylvie Mouzon
- Barly Baruti
- Ntema Ndungidi
- Koffi Olomide

== Government ==
During independence of the Democratic Republic of the Congo, the city was the political central base of the Mouvement National Congolais (MNC). Patrice Lumumba's strong ties with the city had been forged during his days as one of 350 clerks at the central post office. Kisangani is now home to influential political youth groups such as Bana Etats-Unis and Vendome. Since its devolution in 2006, Kisangani has been the Capital of Tshopo with a "strong" mayor-council form of government.

Decentralization of central government power was enabled to give provincial governments more control of matters that directly affect them. The government of Kisangani is more centralized than that of most other DRC cities. As a constitutional democracy, Kisangani is governed by a wide range of institutions: the judiciary, the police, the civil service and the institutions of local government. In Kisangani, the central government is responsible for public education, correctional institutions, libraries, public safety, recreational facilities, sanitation, water supply and welfare services.

The People's Party for Reconstruction and Democracy (PPRD) holds the majority of public offices. As of November 2006, most of registered voters in the city are PPRD. Kisangani is the capital of the Tshopo Province. Kisangani was given the official nickname "City of Hope" by its government. Kisangani, a city home to some 1,200,000 civilians, is administratively divided into six urban communes: Makiso, Tshopo, Mangobo, Kabondo, Kisangani, and Lubunga and the communities of Lubuya and Bera are also parts of Kisangani City. Each commune is home to dozens of smaller neighborhoods (known in French as quartiers).

The head of the city government in Kisangani is the mayor, who is first among equals in the city council. The mayor in the period of 2008–2009 was Guy Shilton Baendo. The city council is a democratically elected institution and is the final decision-making authority in the city, although much power is centralized in the executive committee. The council has jurisdiction over many matters, including public security, agreements with other governments, subsidy programs, the environment, urban planning, and a three-year capital expenditure program. The city council is also required to supervise, standardize or approve certain decisions made by the commune councils.

Reporting directly to the City Council, the executive committee exercises decision-making powers similar to that of the cabinet in a parliamentary system and is responsible for preparing various documents including budgets and by-laws, submitted to the City Council for approval. The decision-making powers of the executive committee cover, in particular, the awarding of contracts or grants, the management of human and financial resources, supplies and buildings. It may also be assigned further powers by the City Council.

=== Administration history ===
During much of the last half of the 20th century, Kisangani's politics were dominated by a growing Mouvement National Congolais (MNC) organization dominated by the charismatic Patrice Lumumba. During 1964 Kisangani was under siege of the Simbas, a group of powerful radical tradition with large and highly organized socialist, anarchist and labor organizations.

Indeed, a decree of Governor General dated 6 September 1958 and entered into force on 1 January 1959 established the city of Stanleyville. The city was divided into communes; each headed by a Mayor, the chief head of all of Stanleyville City was the city's first Mayor.

The first consultation was held in commune of Stanleyville on Sunday, 14 December 1958. By Order No. 12/35 of 6 September 1958, the territory of Stanleyville took the status of a city. Stanleyville was divided into 4 municipalities: Belgian I, Belgian II, Brussels and Stanley.

Stanleyville's City Council assisted each mayor in running the whole city, whilst each of the municipalities was assisted by Municipal Councils. The mayors of municipalities and municipal council members were elected. The city council included members of law, the mayors of municipalities, members appointed has company representatives, middle class representative and members representing the municipal councils.

=== Laws ===
Kisangani and its administrative representatives formed a prominent group responsible for drafting of the Congolese Forestry Code. The new forestry code according to section 89 requires logging companies, to draw up social responsibility contracts with their concessions, which may include building schools, housing and clinics while they carry out logging operations. Essentially the law demands firms to set up company towns. Greenpeace has however attacked this corporate-centered model, because it undermines the state's responsibility to create a functioning system of social services.

The law states that the schooling age is from 5 to 19 years old, which comprises 39% of Kisangani's population. The working age begins at 20 years and retirement age is set at 69 years old of which is 41.42% of the city's demography.

== Education ==
Since the 1950s, Kisangani has been a Congolese center of higher education and research with several universities that are in the city proper or in the immediate environs. Kisangani has the third largest campus of the National University of Congo. Much of the scientific research in the city is done in medicine and the life sciences. The Medicine Faculty at the Université de Kisangani was made infamous by Polio Vaccine conspiracy theorists.

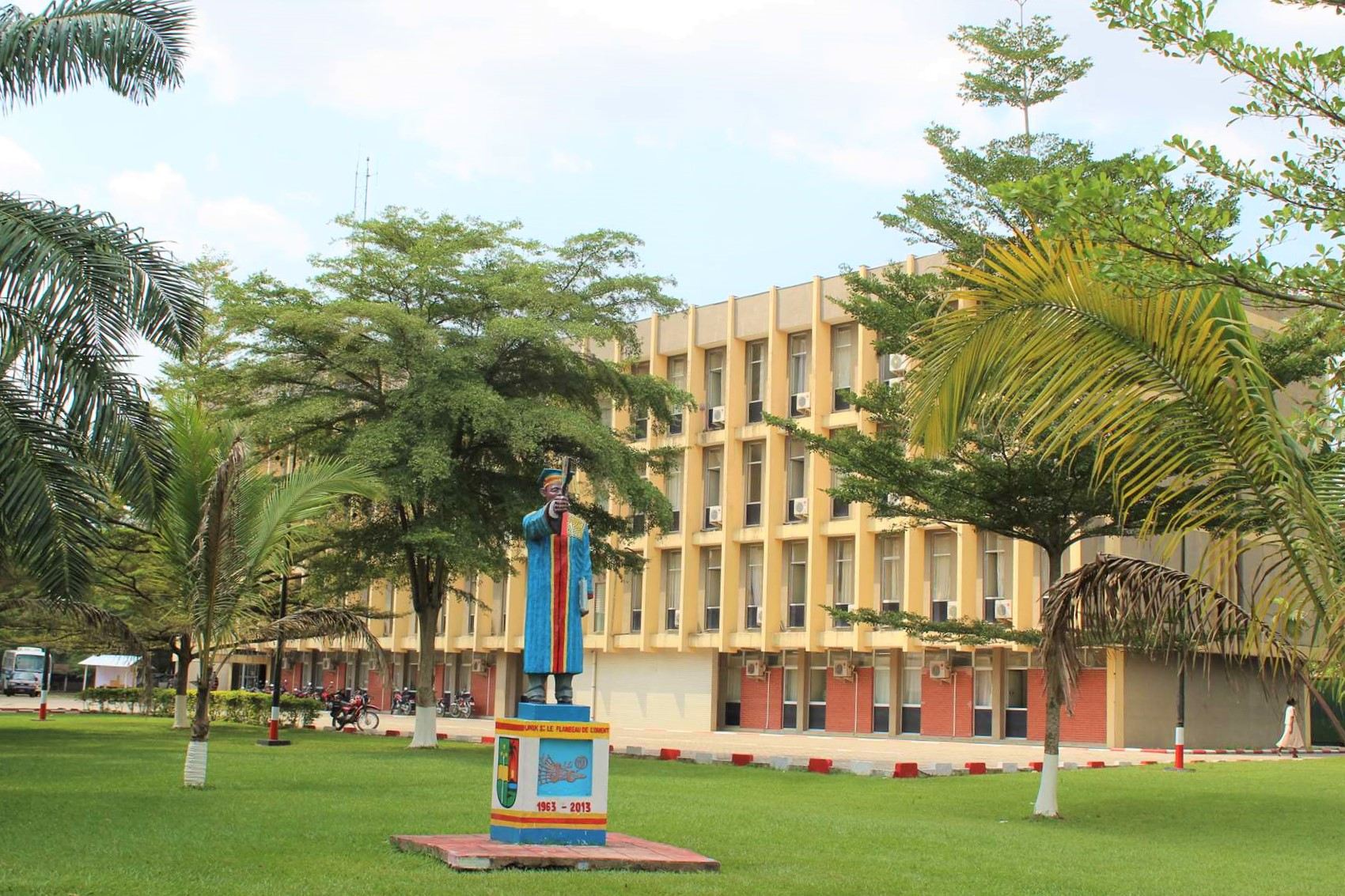
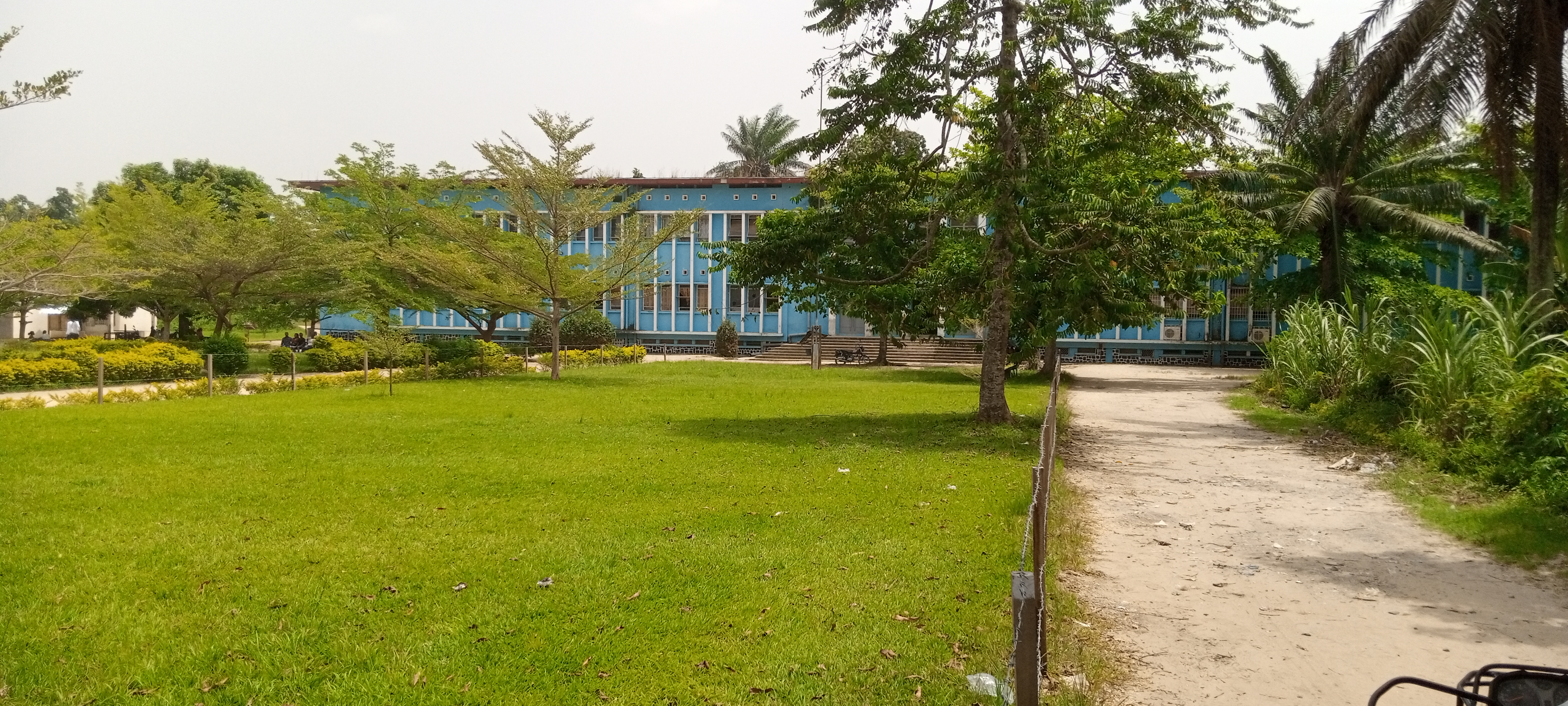
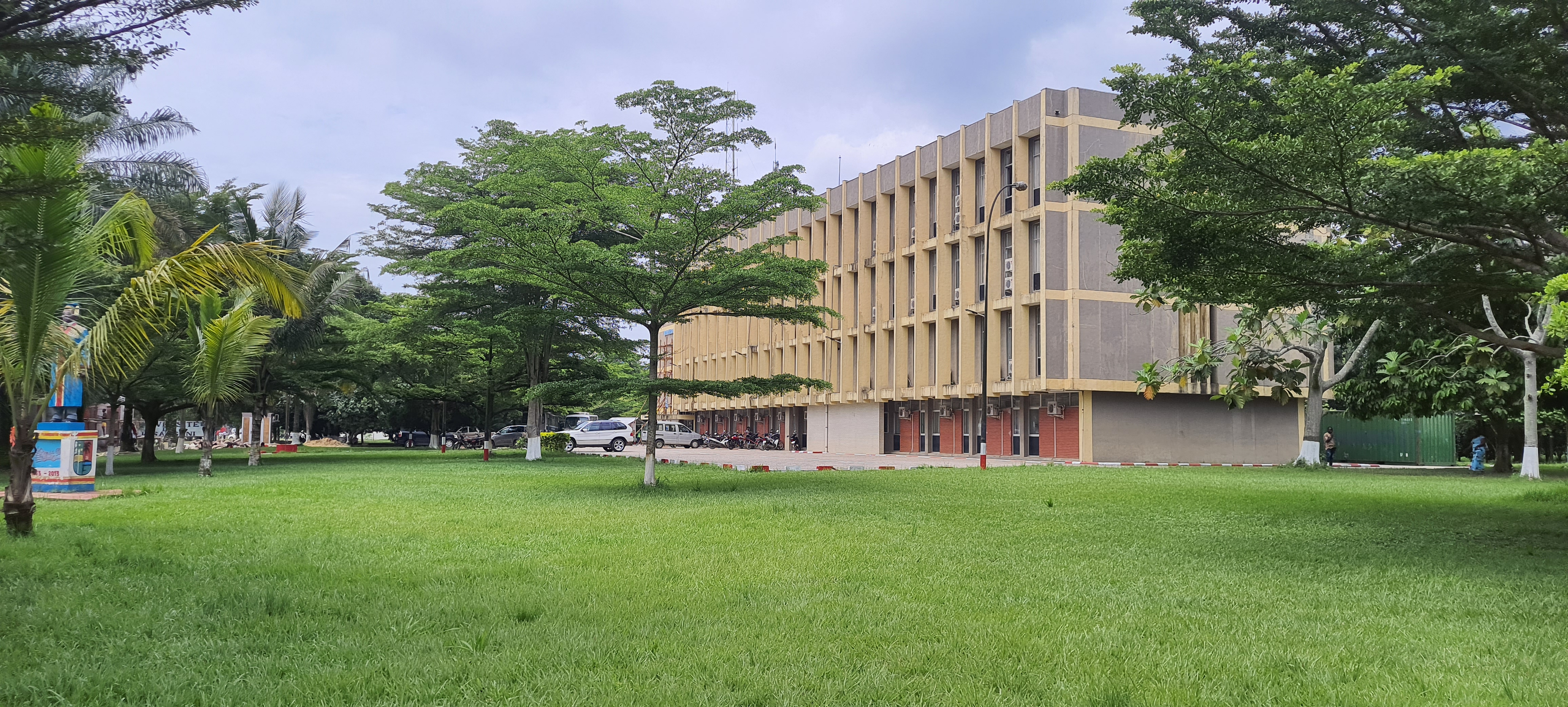
University of Kisangani

In 2007, there were 381 academic and research staff, most of them (215) active in the humanities and social sciences – but the recent history of the institution overshadows its current realities.

Currently, the university's income is derived from student fees (49 percent) and government subsidies (51 percent), but university management reports that the current income level is insufficient for effective operation. In addition, there is a serious need for infrastructure rehabilitation and additions, as well as for the acquisition of research literature. Although the university does not have a strategic plan to develop additional income sources, it is taking steps to increase academic fees to improve the daily operation of the institution.

The main challenges facing the university include serious weaknesses in the university's information and communication technology (ICT) capabilities; and then the lack of qualified staff, of financial means, of premises and equipment, and of literature and laboratories. Clearly, the university's physical infrastructure has not been rebuilt since the troubles. This is one reason why only 20% of the institutional focus of the Université de Kisangani is reckoned for research.

Kisangani is the seat of the Université de Kisangani (1963), Université Mariste du Congo, Institut Superieur du Commerce (ISC), Institut Superieur Pedagogique and Institut de Batiment et de Travaux Publiques, and the Kisangani Hellenic Center. The Kisangani Public Library, which has the largest collection of any public library system in the Kisangani, serves Makiso, Tshopo, Mangobo, Kabondo, Kisangani, Lubunga, Lubuya and Bera. The city's public school system is managed by the Kisangani Department of Education. The primary and secondary schools are public and privately run by secular and religious groups in the city.

== Infrastructure ==
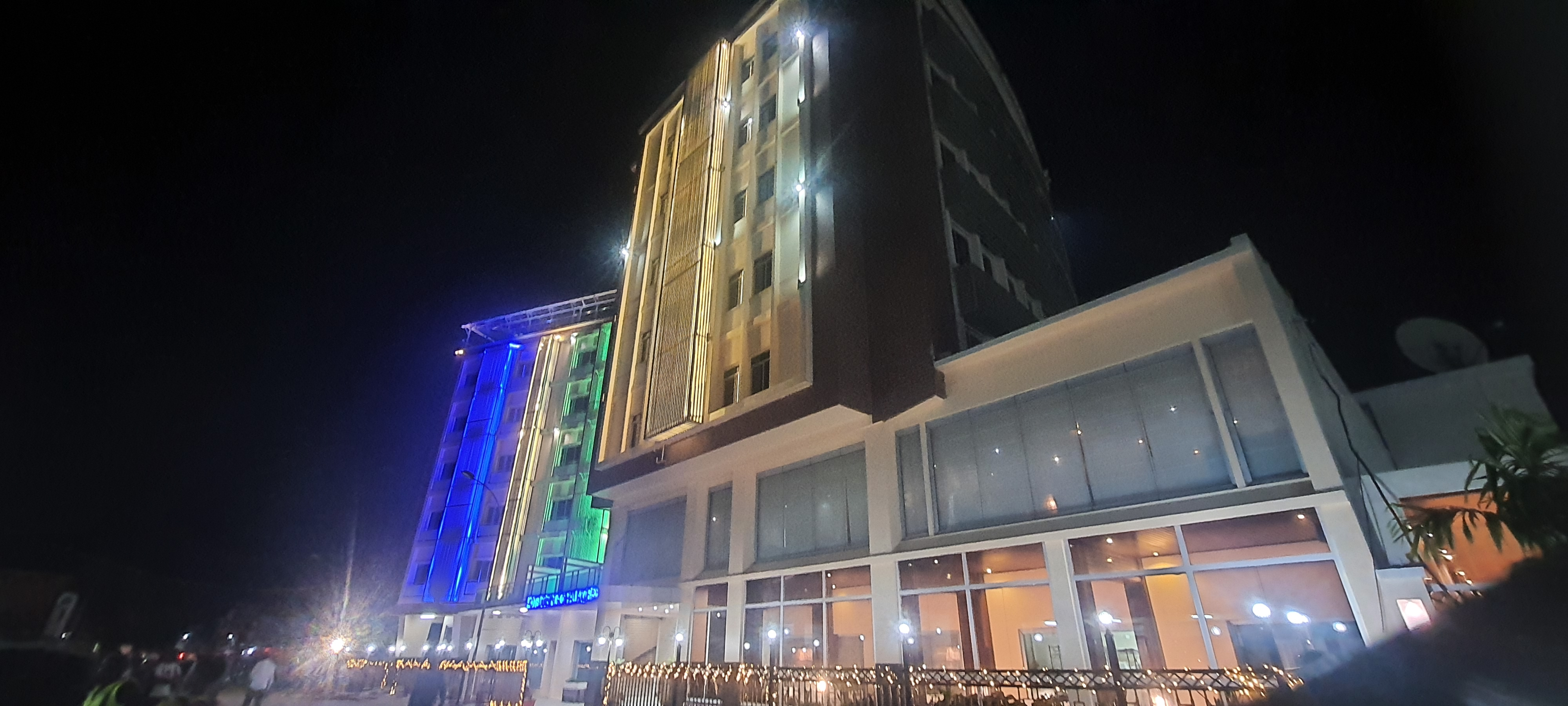
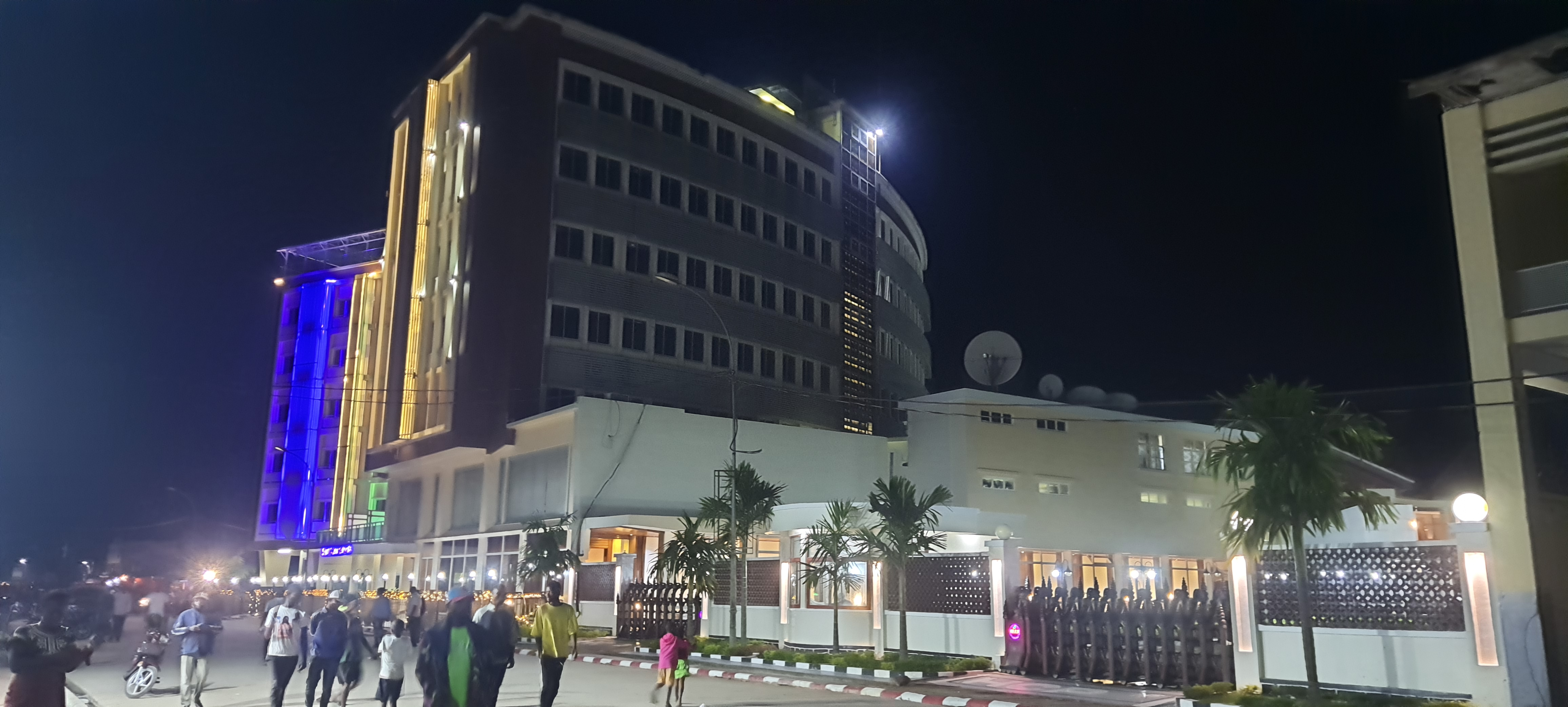
Hôtel Congo Palace in Kisangani

Kisangani grew in importance as a trading port while under Belgian rule. After the upper Congo Basin wars of Euro-Arab in the 1880s the city became the Belgian military and political base of operations in Northern Congo. In the mid-20th century, the city was transformed by immigration and development. A visionary development proposal expanded the city street grid to encompass all of Boyoma, and the 1819 opening of a railroad built to bypass the cataracts on the Congo River, opened shipping routes further into the Congo jungle. Kisangani became the most populous urbanized area and the undisputed economic and cultural centre of Northern Congo.

=== Transport ===
The transportation system in Kisangani is extensive and complex. It includes the longest suspension bridge in Northern Congo. Public local transport is served by a network of buses, commuter trains and waterways that extend across and off the island.

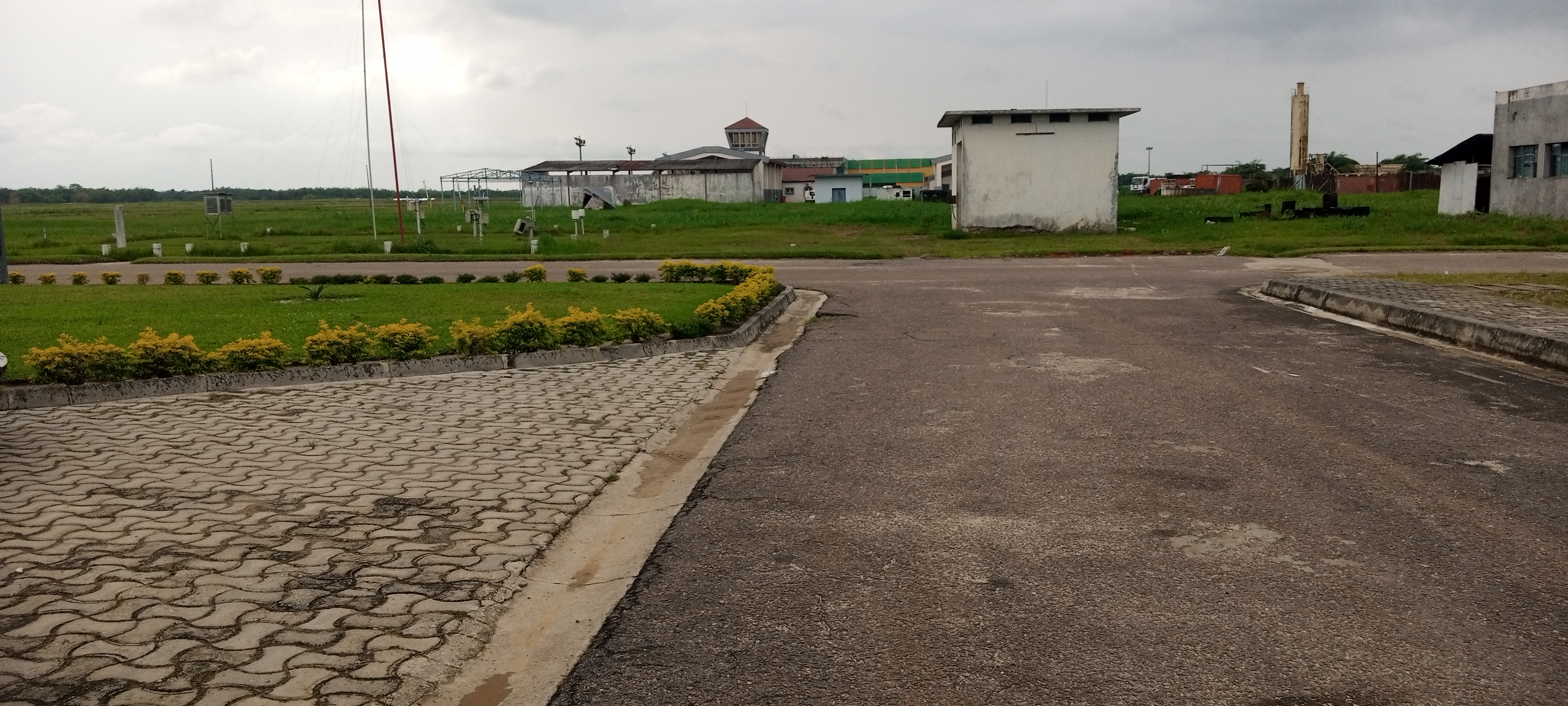
The RVA Kisangani courtyard within the Bangoka Airport concession

Unlike many major cities, Kisangani does not have a problem with vehicular traffic congestion. Kisangani's high rate of public transit use, daily Toleka users and many pedestrian commuters makes it the most energy-efficient major city in the Democratic Republic of the Congo (DRC). Walk and tolek modes of travel account for high percentage of all modes for trips in the city. The Tolek is a cycling taxi ("Toleka" means "Time" in Lingala), that emerged as the primary means of transportation around Kisangani during the mid-1990s.

As the city lies between stretches of the Tshopo and Congo Rivers, many tributaries and islands are intertwined conducive to moving inland waterways for the population of Kisangani and the transportation of goods by ships, boats or canoe (paddle or motorized), from one bank to another and from one neighborhood to another is made possible. Waterway systems connect Kisangani to various locales within and outside the city (including Isangi and Lomami). Kisangani is the highest navigable point on the River Congo and the terminus of river traffic from Kinshasa and all ports operated by ONATRA.

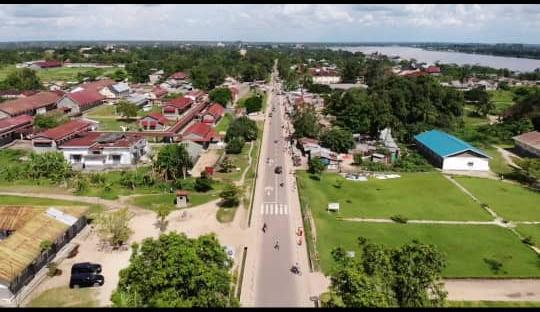
A scenic road in Kisangani, lined with lush greenery

A considerable amount of automobile taxis and buses are also employed to supporting public transit throughout the city. The building of new gas stations and rehabilitation efforts for redevelopment of urban roads and the opening of the No. 4 National Highway Road are among the main factors behind this resumption of automobiles. The redevelopment of the National Highway Road No.4 has meant an increase in scrambling shuttles of traffic between Kisangani, Bafwasende, Komanda, Nurse, Mambasa, Beni and Butembo. Kisangani provides connections to Ubundu and Opala, along the southern corridors of Ubundu and Opala road respectively as well as long-distance road networks to cities such as Lubutu, Walikale, Goma and Kigali (in Rwanda) by way of the National Highway Road No. 2.

Kisangani is part of the Trans-African Highway network 8 (TAH 8), at a length of 6259 km, the Trans-African Highway between Lagos (Nigeria) – Mombasa (Kenya) is longest transcontinental route between east–west of Africa. Kisangani also has access to the Indian Ocean coast by way of a highway corridor connecting the city to Dar es Salaam (Tanzania).

Shipping beyond Kisangani is impossible due to the Boyoma Falls; a portage railway was therefore built to Ubundu. It is operated by Societe Nationale des Chemins de Fer du Congo, starting from Kisangani Station. This is considered the first section of the Great Lakes line.

Kisangani is served by Kisangani Bangoka International Airport on the far east side and the older Simi-Simi Airport on the west side. Bangoka is for commercial passenger flights and cargo only, whereas Simi-Simi mainly serves military purposes, though it also hosts some private and humanitarian flights.

=== Future and proposed projects ===
==== Rail ====
In October 2007, a railway was proposed to connect Kisangani to Kasese in western Uganda. This railway would extend as 1,435 mm (4 ft 8 1/2 in) gauge to the Kenyan port of Lamu.

==== Road ====
The transcontinental road projects in Africa, Trans-African Highway network encompass Kisangani through the Lagos–Mombasa Highway.

Following the mandate of "5 Chantiers" the city of Kisangani road network undergoing redevelopment to make the city more integrated with towns and cities of other provinces, especially the eastern regions that previously made up the former Orientale Province. Boulevards in and around downtown Kisangani are part of the project.
