= University of Goma =

University in the DRC

Coordinates: 1.6777°S 29.2170°E

University of Goma Université de Goma
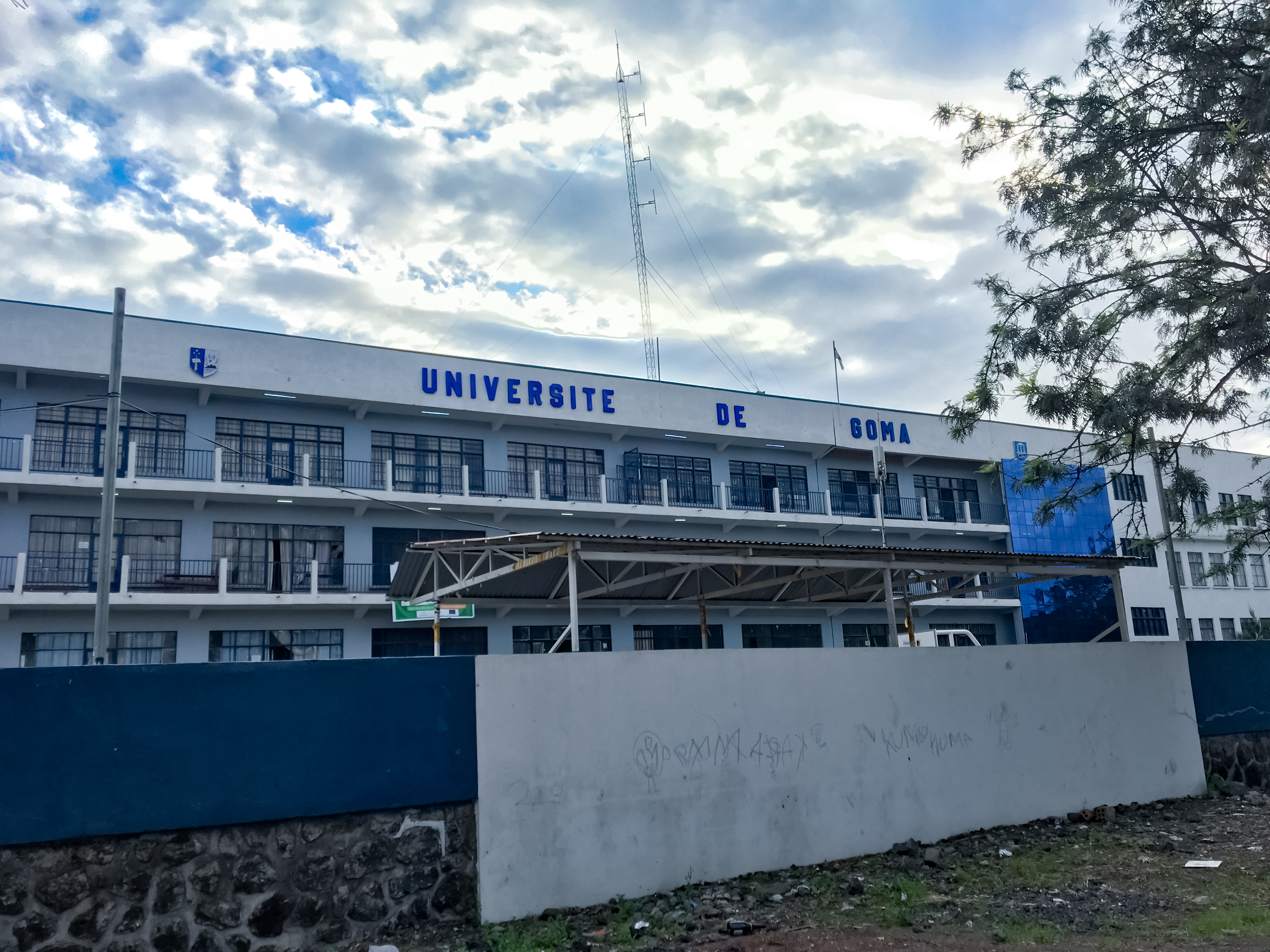
- University of Goma
- Former names: Centre Universitaire du Nord-Kivu (CUNK)
- Type: Public
- Established: 17 June 1993; 32 years ago
- Academic affiliations: Agence universitaire de la Francophonie
- Rector: Muhindo Mughanda
- Students: Over 6,000 (2024)
- Location: Goma, North Kivu, Democratic Republic of the Congo
- Campus: Urban
- Website: https://unigom.ac.cd/

The University of Goma (French: Université de Goma, colloquially denoted by its acronym UNIGOM) is a public university strategically situated in Goma, within the North Kivu Province of the eastern region of the Democratic Republic of the Congo. UNIGOM was established in 1993 as the Centre Universitaire du Nord-Kivu (CUNK) and later elevated to university status in 2005. It offers education primarily in French and aims to provide quality education, conduct research, and serve the community. The university's rector is Muhindo Mughanda.

== History ==
UNIGOM was founded on 17 June 1993, as the Centre Universitaire du Nord-Kivu (CUNK) by the Zairean government under President Mobutu Sese Seko via Ministerial Decision No. ESU/CABMIN/066/93 and became Centre Universitaire Extension de Goma (CUEG) in 1996. Its primary mandate was to disseminate governmental initiatives and inaugurate scholarly initiatives in the North Kivu Province.

Initially, UNIGOM was supervised by the University of Kisangani and embarked on a quest to fulfill its distinct objectives, encompassing the procurement of premises for administrative and academic functions, as well as the identification of suitable human resources. On 15 October 2005, subsequent to phases of development and expansion, the institution attained university status through Ministerial decree n°055/MINESU/CABMIN/RS/2005. This transformative decree heralded the inception of the University of Goma, which accentuated its autonomy and augmented its role in higher education across the region.

== Campuses ==
UNIGOM has three campuses strategically situated within Goma. The Central Campus is located within the premises of the former boarding school of the Goma Institute. The Campus du Lac is positioned near the Cap Kivu Hotel, while the Hospital Campus operates within the buildings of the Goma General Reference Hospital.

== Faculties ==
- Faculty of Medicine
- Faculty of Geological Sciences
- Faculty of Law
- Faculty of Agricultural Sciences
- Faculty of Administrative and Political Social Sciences
- Faculty of Economics and Management
- Faculty of Psychology and Educational Sciences

== See also ==
- List of universities in the Democratic Republic of the Congo
- Education in the Democratic Republic of the Congo
