= Laboratory of Analysis-Research in quantitative Economics =

DR Congo think tank

LAREQ
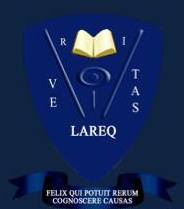
- Founded: January 2, 2012
- Type: Macroeconomic Modeling Think Tank
- Location: (Democratic Republic of the Congo) DRC Kinshasa
- Coordinates: 4.33432°S 15.296888°E
- Staff: 17
- Website: www.lareq.com
- Formerly called: Laboratoire d'analyse-recherche en économie quantitative

The Laboratory of Analysis-Research in Quantitative Economics (French: Laboratoire dAnalyse-Recherche en Economie Quantitative, LAREQ) is a project created in 2012 at the initiative of Jean-Paul K. Tsasa to propose a new order in research in economics departments of Congolese universities. LAREQ is composed of academics and researchers from three main Congolese universities including the University of Kinshasa, Protestant University at Congo, and Catholic University of Congo, and it is directed by a Resident Coordinator and a Deputy Coordinator.

== Objectives ==
The general objective of LAREQ is to play an active role in the development and application of modern macroeconomic modeling in developing countries in Africa.

This general goal can be broken down into two more specific objectives:

- The production and diffusion of research
- The coaching and training of students

=== Production and diffusion of research ===
LAREQ publishes papers, under the rubric of "One pager" for undergraduate and graduate students, and belongs to the Congolese research network in quantitative economics. Since 2013, LAREQ began publish the Makroeconomica Review, a journal devoted to the development and applications of Dynamic stochastic general equilibrium models in developing countries in Africa.

=== Coaching and training of students ===
LAREQ organizes training, workshops and seminars and participates in the supervision of master and PhD dissertations.

== LAREQ Medal of Excellence ==
The LAREQ annually awards the LAREQ Medal of Excellence for outstanding research accomplishments in economics to an African mathematician or economist under the age of 30. The objective of this award is to encourage research at an early age. The winner for 2014 is the Ivorian economist engineer Kone N'Gole.

== Publications ==
- Tsasa, Jean-Paul K. (2014). "Diagnostic de la politique monétaire en Rép. Dém. Congo: Approche par l'équilibre général dynamique stochastique" (PDF). Dynare Working Papers Series (38): 2–72.
- Tsasa, Jean-Paul K. (2014). "Do a Small Open Economy DSGE Model Characterizes Correctly the Cyclicality in the African Least Developed Countries? A Comment". Makroeconomica Review. 1 (1): 5–16. Archived from the original on 2014-02-19.
- Tsasa, Jean-Paul K.; et al. (2013). "Initiation à la modélisation par l'approche d'équilibre général dynamique et stochastique (DSGE) sur Dynare". Fiches Techniques Laréq. Alpha (1): 2–228.
- Kulonga, Guillaume; Tsasa, Jean-Paul K. (2012). "Les Forces Politiques Parlementaires en Rép. Dém. Congo : Simulation du Paysage Politique et Application de l'indice de Shapley – Shubick". One Pager Publication. 4 (13): 86–91.

== See also ==
- Education in the Democratic Republic of the Congo
