= Conradin Perner =

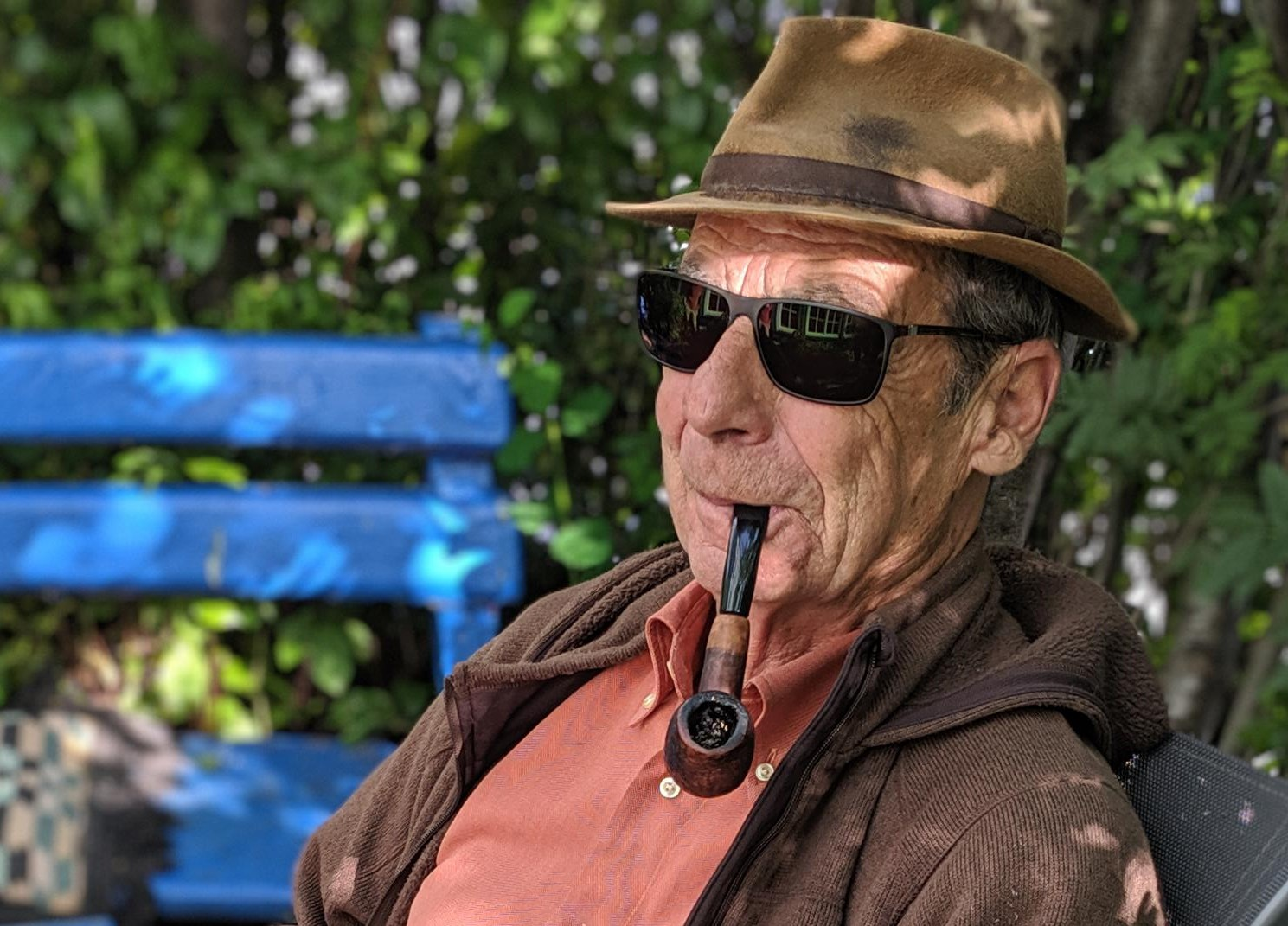
Conradin Perner (2019)

Conradin Perner (born August 31, 1943) is a Swiss humanist, researcher and author. He became known for his work as a literature professor, ethnographer, delegate of the International Committee of the Red Cross as well as through his engagement in South Sudan. As part of his ethnographic work, he lived with the Anyuak tribe in South Sudan for seven years and wrote a comprehensive monograph on the life and culture of the Anyuak. Later, he worked for many years as peace advisor to the Swiss government in the then greater Sudan.

== Life and work ==
Conradin Perner was born in Davos, Switzerland on August 31, 1943. After studying literature in France, Sweden and Zürich, Perner wrote his dissertation in comparative literature on: “Gunnar Ekelöf’s night on the horizon and his encounter with Stephané Mallarmé”. From 1969 to 1971, he taught French language and literature at the University of Kisangani. He then worked for three years as a delegate for the International Committee of the Red Cross (ICRC) in Bangladesh, Vietnam and India. Perner took over the Chair for French literature at the University of Khartoum from the end of 1974 until 1976. That’s when he organized his first trip to South Sudan in preparation for a research project on oral literature. From 1976 to 1983, he conducted research among the Anyuak tribe in South Sudan, sponsored by the University of Zurich and the Swiss National Fund for Scientific Research. The result of his life and work among the Anyuak is an eight-volume monograph, a four-volume dictionary, a Grammar guide, and a collection of Anyuak legends, love songs, satirical verses, and parables. The Anyuak gave him the name of “Kwacakworo”. From 1989 to 1992, Perner resumed working as an ICRC delegate in Sudan and later as the head of the ICRC delegation in Lokichogio, Kenya. Perner is known for his crucial role in the rescue of nearly ten thousand child soldiers, known as the lost boys, in their escape from camps in Ethiopia to South Sudan. From 1993 to 1994, he was an advisor to the ICRC, UNICEF and 45 other organizations active in South Sudan. From 1995 to 2000 he continued with the ICRC and was posted in Afghanistan, Uzbekistan, Kazakhstan, Turkmenistan, Kyrgyzstan, Tajikistan and in the Republic of the Congo. In 2002, Perner was the first commander of the Joint Military Commission in the SPLA sector in the Nuba Mountains in Sudan. He played an instrumental role in the peace efforts in South Sudan and received South Sudan’s first honorary citizenship in 2011.

Perner has worked as a visiting professor at the Paris Nanterre University and the Paris-Sorbonne University as well as an advisor to the Swiss Ministry of Foreign Affairs (FDFA) for peacebuilding in South Sudan’s House of Nationalities Project. He wrote extensive documentation for the FDFA on peacebuilding approaches across all South Sudanese tribes. Today he lives in Davos where he still dedicates his time to writing and producing various philosophical essays and stories about his work and his life.
