= University of Mbuji Mayi =

Private university in the DRC

- Université de Mbuji Mayi (French)
- Former names: Mbuji Mayi Center University
- Type: Private
- Established: 1 October 2004; 21 years ago
- Location: Mbuji Mayi, Democratic Republic of the Congo; 6.1131°S 23.6008°E
- Campus: Urban
- Nickname: UM
- Website: University website

The University of Mbuji Mayi (UM) is an accredited private university in the Democratic Republic of the Congo, located in the province of Kasai-Oriental, city of Mbuji Mayi. The university is one of the many initiatives by the "Fondation Cardinal Malula". The UM, exists alongside other institutions of higher learning such as the C.U.M (Centre Universitaire de Mbuyi). People mostly mix these two different and separate entities. At its creation, the C.U.M was an Extension of national public universities" amongst which the University of Kinshasa, the University of Lubumbashi and the University of Kisangani. Instruction is in French.

== History ==
The University was created 1 October 2004 as Mbuji Mayi Center University (C.U.K.) extension of the University of Kinshasa, and became autonomous in 2010 following Ministerial order No. 157/MINESU/CABMIN/EBK/PK/2010 27 September 2010.

== See also ==
- List of universities in the Democratic Republic of the Congo
- Education in the Democratic Republic of the Congo
