= Catholic University of Graben =

Private university in the DRC

Catholic University of Graben (U.C.G)
- Université catholique du Graben
- Motto: Ascende Supérius (Latin), translated as Ascend Higher or Aim Higher
- Type: Private university Catholic
- Established: 2003; 23 years ago
- Founder: Emmanuel Kataliko
- Affiliations: Association of African Universities, AUF (Agence Universitaire de la Francophonie)
- Religious affiliation: Catholic Church
- Chancellor: Melchisedec Paluku Sikuli
- Rector: Prof. Angélus Mafikiri Tsongo Ngw'esse
- Dean: Télésphore Muhindo Malonga
- Location: Butembo, North Kivu, Democratic Republic of the Congo; 0.128°N 29.283°E
- Campus: Butembo
- Language: French
- Website: Official website

The Catholic University of Graben (U.C.G) is a private Catholic university in the Democratic Republic of the Congo, located in Butembo. The language of instruction is French.

== History ==
The university was established on 1 October 2003. It gained autonomy in 2010 following ministerial decree No. 157/MINESU/CABMIN/EBK/PK/2010 dated 27, which granted autonomy to several extensions of higher education institutions.

== Faculties ==
- Faculty of Agricultural sciences
- Faculty of Law
- Faculty of Medicine
- Faculty of Social, Political and Administrative Sciences
- Faculty of Economics and Management Sciences
- Faculty of Polytechnic Sciences
- Faculty of Veterinary medicine
- Faculty of Pharmacy
- Faculty of Philosophy

== Teaching staff ==
- Melchisedec Sikuli Paluku, Bishop of the Roman Catholic Diocese of Butembo-Beni, Professor of Philosophy and Logic
- Apollinaire Malumalu Muholongu, Professor of Political Science and former President of the Independent Electoral Commission (2006)
- Jean-Paul Witende Mundama, Lecturer in Medical Ethics and Deontology, Intellectual from Butembo and speaker
- Marie-Lea Kaswera wasukundi, Journalist at Radio CANDIP BUNIA and RTNC-FEC Butembo (Kinande desk)
- Maman Kasoki, Former Deputy Minister of Education, Mathematics Teacher
- Théodore Sikuli Uvasaka Makala, Mayor of the city of Butembo (teaching domain: Political and Administrative Sciences)
- Raphael Muhindo Kambalume, Former Mayor of Butembo City and Lecturer in Demography and History (especially Africa and Congo)Honorary doctorates
- Gerhard Bringmann from the University of Würzburg
- Cardinal Fiorenzo Angelini
- David Mcallister, Director of the Irish Section of the Christian Blind Association
- Mylène Fournier, Founder-President of the France University Butembo Association (FUB), http://fubfrance.blogspot.fr

== See also ==
- List of universities in the Democratic Republic of the Congo
- Education in the Democratic Republic of the Congo
