= University of Kolwezi =

Public university in the DRC

- Université de Kolwezi (French)
- Former name: Kolwezi Center University
- Type: Public
- Established: 1 October 2004; 21 years ago
- Location: Kolwezi, Democratic Republic of the Congo
- Campus: Urban
- Nickname: UNIKOL
- Website: University website

The University of Kolwezi (UNIKOL) is a public university in the Democratic Republic of the Congo, located in the province of Katanga, city of Kolwezi. At its creation, it was an extension of the University of Lubumbashi, then called University Centre of Kolwezi (C.U.K.). Instruction is in French.

== History ==
The University was created 1 October 2004 as Kolwezi Center University (C.U.K.), extension of the University of Lubumbashi, and became autonomous in 2010 following Ministerial order No. 157/MINESU/CABMIN/EBK/PK/2010 27 September 2010.

== See also ==
- Kolwezi
- Katanga Province
- Education in the Democratic Republic of the Congo
- List of universities in the Democratic Republic of the Congo
