= University of Mbandaka =

Public university in the DRC

- Université de Mbandaka (French)
- Former names: Mbandaka Center University
- Type: Public
- Established: 1 October 2004; 21 years ago
- Location: Mbandaka, Democratic Republic of the Congo; 0.0362°N 18.2505°E
- Campus: Urban
- Nickname: UNIMBA

The University of Mbandaka (UNIMBA) is a public university in the Democratic Republic of the Congo, in the province of Equateur, in the city of Mbandaka. At its creation, it was an extension of the University of Kinshasa, then called "University Centre of Mbandaka (C.U.M.)". As of 2012 it had 800 students in six faculties. Instruction is in French.

== History ==
The university was created on 1 October 2004 as Mbandaka Center University (C.U.M.), extension of the University of Kinshasa, and became autonomous in 2010 following Ministerial order No. 157/MINESU/CABMIN/EBK/PK/2010 on 27 September 2010.

== See also ==
- List of universities in the Democratic Republic of the Congo
- Education in the Democratic Republic of the Congo
