= List of universities in the Democratic Republic of the Congo =

Location of the Democratic Republic of the Congo

This is a list of universities in the Democratic Republic of the Congo.

== Universities ==
Institution	In French	Abbreviation	Year Founded	Location	Religious Denomination	Total students	Privatization
University of Cassambondo	Université de Cassambondo	UNICAS	2024	Kalemie			Private
New Horizons University	Université Nouveaux Horizons	UNH	2015	Lubumbashi		2,000	Private
Christian Bilingual University of Congo	Université Chrétienne Bilingue du Congo	UCBC		Beni			Private
Open Christian University	Université Chrétienne Overte	OCU	2021	Goma			Private
University Shalom of Bunia	Université Shalom de Bunia	USB	1961	Bunia	Protestant	928	Private
University of Bandundu	Université de Bandundu	UNIBAND		Bandundu		1,500	Public
Hope University of Congo	Université Espoir du Congo	UEC	1989	Baraka		1,500	Private
Kasavubu University	Université Kasa-Vubu		2010	Boma, Bas-Congo			
Kongo University	Université Kongo	UK	2010	Bas-Congo		3,450	Private
Catholic University of Bukavu	Université Catholique de Bukavu	UCB	1989	Bukavu	Catholic	3,046	Private
Official University of Bukavu	Université officielle de Bukavu	UOB		Bukavu			
University of Cepromad	Université du Cepromad - Bukavu	UNIC-ISGEA		Bukavu			
Evangelical University in Africa	Université évangélique en Afrique	UEA		Bukavu			
Adventist University of Lukanga	Université adventiste de Lukanga			Butembo			
Catholic University of Graben	Université catholique du Grabben	UCG	1989	Butembo	Catholic	1,278	Private
University Divina Gloria Butembo	Université Divina Gloria de Butembo	UDGB		Butembo			
University of Gbadolite	Université de Gbadolite	UNIGBA	1992	Gbadolite			Public
University of Goma	Université de Goma	UNIGOM	1993	Goma			Public
Free University of the Great Lakes Countries	Université libre des Pays des Grands Lacs	ULPGL	1991	Goma	Protestant	1,500	Private
Adventist University of Goma	Université adventiste de Goma	UAGO		Goma			
University of High Technology of Great Lakes	Université des Hautes Technologies des Grands Lacs	UHTGL		Goma			Private
University of Kivu	Université du Kivu	UNIKIVU		Goma			
Nature Conservation and Development University of Kasugho	Université de la Conservation et de Développement de la Nature de Kasugho	UCNDK		Goma			Public
University of Kalemie	Université de Kalemie	UNIKAL	2004	Kalemie		800	Public
University of Kamina	Université de Kamina	UNIKAM	2004	Kamina		5,000	Public
University of Kananga	Université de Kananga	UNIKAN	2010	Kananga			Public
University of Notre Dame du Kasai	Université Notre-Dame du Kasai	UKA		Kananga	Catholic		
Kamina Methodist University				Katanga	Methodist		Private
University of Kikwit	Université de Kikwit	Unikik	1992 (2010)	Kikwit			
University of Kindu	Université de Kindu			Kindu			
University of Kinshasa, formerly known as Lovanium University	Université de Kinshasa, anciennement appelée l'université Lovanium	UNIKIN	1954 (1924)	Kinshasa		26,186	Public
Marist University of Congo	Université Mariste du Congo	UMC	2012	Kinshasa	Catholic	1,500	Private
National Pedagogical University	Université Pédagogique Nationale	UPN		Kinshasa			
Protestant University in Congo	Université Protestante du Congo	UPC		Kinshasa	Protestant		
University William Booth	Université William Booth	UWB	1986 (1934)	Kinshasa			
University of Technology of the Congo	Université de Technologie du Congo	UTC	2010	Kinshasa			Private
Catholic University of the Congo	Université Catholique du Congo			Kinshasa	Catholic		
University Simon Kimbangu	Université de Simon Kimbangu		1994	Kinshasa			Private
Free University of Kinshasa	Université Libre de Kinshasa	ULK	1988	Kinshasa		8,799	Private
American University of Kinshasa	Université Américaine de Kinshasa ou Université Franco-Américaine de Kinshasa			Kinshasa			
University Cardinal Malula-Kinshasa	Université Cardinal Malula-Kinshasa			Kinshasa	Catholic		
Pan-African University of the Congo	Université Panafricaine de Congo			Kinshasa			
Central University of Kinshasa	Université Centrale de Kinshasa			Kinshasa			
Christian University of Kinshasa	Université Chrétienne de Kinshasa	UCKIN		Kinshasa			
International Christian University (ICU)	Université Chrétienne internationale	UCI	1993	Kinshasa			
Reverend Kim University	Université Révérend Kim			Kinshasa			
Kinshasa University Binza	Université Kinshasa Binza			Kinshasa			
University of Kisangani	Université de Kisangani	UNIKIS	1963	Kisangani		9,120	Public
University of Kolwezi	Université de Kolwezi	UNIKOL		Kolwezi		2,400	Public
University of Cepromad	Université du Cepromad - Kolwezi	UNIC-ISGEA		Kolwezi			
University of Likasi	Université de Likasi	UNILI		Likasi			
University of Lisala	Université de Lisala			Lisala			Public
University of Lubumbashi	Université de Lubumbashi	UNILU	1955	Lubumbashi		33,000	Public
Protestant University of Lubumbashi	Université protestante de Lubumbashi	UPL		Lubumbashi	Protestant		Private
Graduate Institute of Health Science	Institut Universitaire des Sciences de la Santé	IUSS		Lubumbashi			
Baptist University of the Congo	Université Baptiste du Congo	UBC		Lubumbashi			
Labour University of Lubumbashi	Université du Travail de Lubumbashi	UNITRA		Lubumbashi			
Free University of Luozi	Université Libre de Luozi	ULL	1997	Luozi			Private
University of Mbandaka	Université de Mbandaka	UNIMBA		Mbandaka		800	Public
University of Mbuji Mayi	Université de Mbujimayi Tshikama			Mbuji-Mayi			
Official University of Mbujimayi	Université Officielle de Mbujimayi	UOM		Mbuji-Mayi			
Eben-Ezer University of Minembwe	Université Eben-Ezer de Minembwe	UEMI	2011	Minembwe	Christian	300	Private
Katanga Methodist University	Université Méthodiste au Katanga	UMK	1951	Mulungwishi	Methodist		Private
Methodist University in Katanga	Université Méthodiste au Katanga			Mulungwishi			
University of Mwene-Ditu in Mwene-Ditu	Université de Mwene-Ditu	UMD		Mwene-Ditu			Public
Democratic Republic of Congo International University	Université Internationale de la République Démocratique du Congo	DRCIU		Kinshasa			Private
Official Unviversité Ruwenzori	Unviversité Officielle de Ruwenzori	UOR		Ruwenzori			

== Other institutions ==
Institution	In French	Abbreviation	Location	Type	Total students
Congolese Diplomatic Academy	Académie Diplomatique Congolaise	ADC	Kinshasa	Higher Institutes	
Centre for Studies Egyptology Cheik Anta Diop of INADEP	Centre d'études égyptologiques Cheik Anta Diop de l'INADEP	INADEP	?	Centre or Institute of Scientific and Technological Research	
Centre for Studies and Arts Presenter (CEDAR)	Centre d'Etudes et de Diffusion des Arts	CEDAR	?	Centre or Institute of Scientific and Technological Research	
Higher Pedagogical Institute Baraka	Institut Supérieur Pédagogique de Baraka	ISPBA	Baraka	Centre or Institute of Scientific and Technological Research	
Natural Sciences Research Centre	Centre de Recherche en Sciences Naturelles	CRSN ex IRSAC	Bukavu	Centre or Institute of Scientific and Technological Research	
Higher Institute of Rural Development	Institut Supérieur de Développement Rural	ISDR	Bukavu	Centre or Institute of Scientific and Technological Research	
University Center Bunia Extension	Centre Universitaire Extension de Bunia	CUEB	Bunia	Centre or Institute of Scientific and Technological Research	
Major Seminary of Bunia, Theologate St Cyprien	Grand Séminaire de Bunia, Théologat St Cyprien		Bunia	Centre or Institute of Scientific and Technological Research	
Higher Institute of Commerce	Institut Supérieur de Commerce	ISC	Goma	Centre or Institute of Scientific and Technological Research	
Higher Institute of Computer and Management	Institut Supérieur d'Informatique et de Gestion	ISIG	Goma	Centre or Institute of Scientific and Technological Research	
Higher Institute of Mulungu development technique	Institut Supérieur de Technique de Développement Mulungu	ISTD	Ibanda	Centre or Institute of Scientific and Technological Research	
Higher Institute of Kalehe development technique	Institut Supérieur de Technique de Développement Kalehe	ISTD	Kalehe	Centre or Institute of Scientific and Technological Research	
Theoretical and Applied Linguistics Centre	Centre de Linguistique Théorique et Appliquée	CELTA	Kinshasa	Centre or Institute of Scientific and Technological Research	
Laboratory of Analysis-Research in quantitative Economics	Laboratoire d'Analyse-Recherche en Economie quantitative	LAREQ	Kinshasa	Centre or Institute of Scientific and Technological Research	
Geophysical Research Centre	Centre de Recherche en Géophysique	CRG	Kinshasa	Centre or Institute of Scientific and Technological Research	
Geological and Mining Research Centre	Centre de Recherches Géologiques et Minières	CRGM	Kinshasa	Centre or Institute of Scientific and Technological Research	
Regional Centre for Nuclear Studies Kinshasa	Centre Régional d'Etudes Nucléaires de Kinshasa	CREN	Kinshasa	Centre or Institute of Scientific and Technological Research	
Institute of Economic and Social Research, the Faculty of Economic Sciences UNIKIN	Institut des Recherches Economiques et Sociales, de la Faculté des Sciences Economiques de l'UNIKIN	IRES	Kinshasa	Centre or Institute of Scientific and Technological Research	
Centre for the Study of African religions (CERA)	Centre d'Etudes des Religions Africaines	CERA	Kinshasa	Centre or Institute of Scientific and Technological Research	
Congolese Institute for Nature Conservation	Institut Congolais pour la Conservation de la Nature	ICCN	Kinshasa ?	Centre or Institute of Scientific and Technological Research	
Agri-Food Research Centre	Centre de Recherche Agro-Alimentaire	CRAA	Lubumbashi	Centre or Institute of Scientific and Technological Research	
Agro-veterinary Higher Institute of Walungu	Inst Supérieur Agro-Vétérinaire de Walungu	ISEAV	Walungu	Centre or Institute of Scientific and Technological Research	
Higher Institute of Medical Technology	Institut Supérieur de Techniques Médicales - Kanyamulande de Walungu	ISTM	Walungu	Centre or Institute of Scientific and Technological Research	
Higher Pedagogical Institute Walungu	Institut Supérieur Pédagogique de Walungu	ISP	Walungu	Centre or Institute of Scientific and Technological Research	
Higher Institute of medical techniques Nyangezi	Institut Supérieur de Techniques Médicales de Nyangezi	ISTM	Nyangezi	Centre or Institute of Scientific and Technological Research	
Faculty of Theology Evangelical Boma	Faculte de Theologie Evangelique de Boma	FACTEB	Boma	College	60
Institute of Information Salama	fr:Ecole Supérieure d'Informatique Salama		?	Higher Institutes	
Higher Institute of Computer Programming and Analysis	Institut Supérieur d'Informatique, Programmation et Analyse	ISIPA	?	Higher Institutes	
Higher Institute of Rural Development	Institut Supérieur de Développement Rural	ISDR	Bandundu	Higher Institutes	
Higher Pedagogical Institute Kikwit - Bandundu	Institut Supérieur Pédagogique de Kikwit		Bandundu	Higher Institutes	
Higher Institute of Medical Techniques	Institut Supérieur de Techniques Médicales	ISTMBA	Baraka	Higher Institutes	
Higher Pedagogical Institute Baraka	Institut Supérieur Pédagogique de Baraka	ISPBA	Baraka	Higher Institutes	
Higher Institute of Commerce	Institut Supérieur de Commerce	ISC	Bas-Congo	Higher Institutes	
Higher Pedagogical Institute Mbanza-Ngungu	Institut Supérieur Pédagogique de Mbanza-Ngungu		Bas-Congo	Higher Institutes	
Higher Pedagogical Institute	Institut supérieur pédagogique	ISP	Budjala	Higher Institutes	
Higher Pedagogical Institute in Bukavu	fr:Institut supérieur pédagogique de Bukavu	ISPB	Bukavu	Higher Institutes	
Research Center of Natural Sciences Lwiro	Centre des recherches en sciences naturelles de Lwiro		Bukavu	Higher Institutes	
Higher Institute of applied techniques from Bukavu to Burhuza	Institut supérieur de techniques appliquées de Bukavu à Burhuza	ISTA	Bukavu	Higher Institutes	
Higher Institute of Medical Technology	Institut supérieur des techniques médicales	ISTM	Bukavu	Higher Institutes	
Higher Institute of building and construction	Institut supérieur de bâtiment et travaux publics	IBTP	Butembo	Higher Institutes	
Higher Institute of Rural Development of the Great Lakes	fr:Institut supérieur de développement rural des Grands-Lacs	ISDR/GL	Goma	Higher Institutes	
Higher Institute of Statistics and technologies Goma	fr:Institut supérieur de statistique et de nouvelles technologies de Goma	ISSNT-GOMA	Goma	Higher Institutes	
Higher Institute of Commerce	Institut Supérieur de Commerce	ISC	Goma	Higher Institutes	
Tourism Higher Institute	Institut supérieur de tourisme	IST	Goma	Higher Institutes	
Higher Institute of Arts and Crafts	Institut supérieur des arts et métiers	ISAM	Goma	Higher Institutes	
Higher Institute of Management in the Great Lakes region	Institut supérieur des management dans la région des Grands Lacs	ISMAGL	Goma	Higher Institutes	
Institute for Applied techniques Goma	Institut supérieur des techniques appliquées de Goma	ISTA	Goma	Higher Institutes	
Higher Pedagogical Institute / Vitshumbi	Institut supérieur pédagogique/Vitshumbi	ISP	Goma	Higher Institutes	
Goma Volcano Observatory	Observatoire volcanologique de Goma	OVG	Goma	Higher Institutes	
Higher Pedagogical Institute Kananga	Institut supérieur pédagogique de Kanang	ISP	Kananga	Higher Institutes	
Higher Institute for Conservation Tayna Kanyabayonga North Kivu	Institut supérieur de la conservation de la nature Tayna, Kanyabayonga		Kanyabayonga	Higher Institutes	
Institute of Education Kikwit	Institut Supérieur Pédagogique de Kikwit		Kikwit	Higher Institutes	
University of Bandundu, African Institute for Future Studies	Université de Bandundu fr:Institut Africain d'Études Prospectives	UB	Kikwit	Higher Institutes	
Agro-veterinary Higher Institute	Institut supérieur agro-vétérinaire	ISAV	Kimwenza	Higher Institutes	
Kinshasa Fine Arts Academy	Académie des beaux-arts	ABA	Kinshasa	Higher Institutes	
Computer School of Electronics and accounting (EIECO)	École d'Informatique d'Électronique et d'Expertise comptable	EIECO	Kinshasa	Higher Institutes	
Computer School Finance	fr:École informatique des finances	EIFi	Kinshasa	Higher Institutes	
Kinshasa Higher Institute of statistics (ISS / KIN);	fr:Institut supérieur de statistiques de Kinshasa	I.S.S./KIN	Kinshasa	Higher Institutes	
Egyptological Studies Center of the CA Diop	Centre d'études égyptologiques C.A. Diop de l'INADEP	INADEP	Kinshasa	Higher Institutes	
Interdisciplinary Centre for Continuing Education	Centre interdisciplinaires pour l'éducation permanente	CIDEP	Kinshasa	Higher Institutes	
Graduate School of Advertising and the Media	École supérieure de publicité et médias	ESPM	Kinshasa	Higher Institutes	
Graduate School of Computer Trades and Trade	École supérieure des métiers d'informatique et de commerce	ESMICOM	Kinshasa	Higher Institutes	
Catholic Faculties of Kinshasa	Facultés catholiques de Kinshasa	FACAKIN	Kinshasa	Higher Institutes	
African Institute for Future Studies	Institut africain d'études prospectives	INADEP	Kinshasa	Higher Institutes	
National Institute of buildings and public works	Institut des bâtiments et des travaux publics	IBTP	Kinshasa	Higher Institutes	
Institute of higher and university of Kinshasa	Institut d'études supérieures et universitaires de Kinshasa	INESSUKIN	Kinshasa	Higher Institutes	
Oil and Gas Institute	Institut du pétrole et du gaz	IPG	Kinshasa	Higher Institutes	
Faculty Development Institute	Institut facultaire de développement	IFAD	Kinshasa	Higher Institutes	
Faculty Institute of Information Sciences and Communication	Institut facultaire des sciences de l'information et de la communication	IFASIC	Kinshasa	Higher Institutes	
Faculty Institute Songwai	Institut facultaire Songwai	IFAS	Kinshasa	Higher Institutes	
National Institute of Arts	Institut national des arts	INA	Kinshasa	Higher Institutes	
Graduate Institute of Medical Education Technologies	Institut supérieur d'Enseignement Techniques Médical	ISETM	Kinshasa	Higher Institutes	
Higher Institute of Architecture and Urban Planning	Institut supérieur d'architecture et d'urbanisme	ex IBTP Gombe	Kinshasa	Higher Institutes	
Higher Institute of Economics, Legal and cooperatives	Institut supérieur de sciences économiques, juridiques et coopératives	ISSEC	Kinshasa	Higher Institutes	
Higher Institute of Computer Programming and Analysis	Institut supérieur d'Informatique Programmation et Analyse	ISIPA	Kinshasa	Higher Institutes	
Higher Institute of Computer, programming and analysis	Institut supérieur d'informatique, programmation et analyse	ISIPA	Kinshasa	Higher Institutes	
Higher Institute of Social Work	Institut supérieur du travail social	I.S.T.S ex-CAFES	Kinshasa	Higher Institutes	
Higher Pedagogical Institute Kamituga - Kinshasa	Institut supérieur pédagogique de Kamituga	ISPKa	Kinshasa	Higher Institutes	
Higher Pedagogical Institute of Gombe	Institut supérieur pédagogique de la Gombe	ISP/Gombe	Kinshasa	Higher Institutes	
Institute for Applied Technical	fr:Institut supérieur des techniques appliquées	ISTA	Kinshasa	Higher Institutes	
Higher Institute of Arts and Crafts	Institut supérieur des arts et métiers	ISAM	Kinshasa	Higher Institutes	
Higher Institute of Medical Technology	Institut Supérieur des Techniques Médicales	ISTM/KIN	Kinshasa	Higher Institutes	
Teaching Higher and Technical Institute of Kinshasa	Institut Supérieur Pédagogique et Technique de Kinshasa	ISPT-KIN	Kinshasa	Higher Institutes	
Institute for Applied Technical Kolwezi	Institut supérieur des techniques appliquées de Kolwezi	ISTA	Kolwezi	Higher Institutes	
Technical Institute for Higher Sankuru	Institut superieur technique de sankuru	ISTS	Lodja?	Higher Institutes	
Superior School of Computing Salama	Ecole supérieure d'informatique Salama	ESIS	Lubumbashi	Higher Institutes	
Seminary Lubumbashi - Lubumbashi	fr:Grand séminaire de Lubumbashi		Lubumbashi	Higher Institutes	
Lubumbashi Higher Institute for Statistics	Institut supérieur de statistique de Lubumbashi	ISS	Lubumbashi	Higher Institutes	
Lubumbashi Higher Institute of Technology	Institut supérieur de technologie de Lubumbashi		Lubumbashi	Higher Institutes	
ISTC - Lubumbashi	Institut supérieur des techniques commerciales - Lubumbashi	ISTC	Lubumbashi	Higher Institutes	
Higher Institute for Labour Studies (ISES) - Lubumbashi	Institut supérieur d'études sociales	ISES	Lubumbashi	Higher Institutes	
Higher Institute of Business and Legal technical studies Lubumbashi	Institut supérieur d'études techniques commerciales et juridiques de Lubumbashi		Lubumbashi	Higher Institutes	
Higher Institute Inter-lord Mulolwa	Institut supérieur intérdiocésain monseigneur Mulolwa		Lubumbashi	Higher Institutes	
Higher Pedagogical Institute	Institut supérieur pédagogique	ISP	Lubumbashi	Higher Institutes	
University Institute of Congo	Institut universitaire du Congo	IUC	Lubumbashi	Higher Institutes	
		ISEC	Lubumbashi	Higher Institutes	
Higher Institute of Commercial Technology	Institut supérieur des techniques commerciales	ISTC	Matadi	Higher Institutes	
Higher Pedagogical Institute (ISP) - Mbandaka	Institut supérieur pédagogique	ISP	Mbandaka	Higher Institutes	
Higher Institute of Rural Development (ISDR-Mbandaka) - Mbandaka	Institut supérieur de développement rural	ISDR	Mbandaka	Higher Institutes	
Higher Institute of Medical technology (ISTM) - Mbandaka	Institut supérieur de technique médical	ISTM	Mbandaka	Higher Institutes	
Higher Institute of Management and Technology (ISGT) - Mbuji-Mayi	Institut supérieur de gestion et des techniques	ISGT	Mbuji-Mayi	Higher Institutes	
Institute for Higher medical techniques Mbuji Mayi	Institut superieur de techniques medical de Mbuji Mayi	ISTM	Mbuji-Mayi	Higher Institutes	
Educational and Higher Technical Institute of Mweka	fr:Institut supérieur pédagogique et technique de Mweka	ISPT	Mweka	Higher Institutes	
Higher Institute of Commerce (ISC) of Uvira	Institut supérieur de commerce	ISC	Uvira	Higher Institutes	
Higher Institute of Rural Development	Institut supérieur de développement rural	ISDR	Uvira	Higher Institutes	
Higher Institute of Medical Technology	Institut supérieur des techniques médicales	ISTM	Uvira	Higher Institutes	
Faculty Institute of Agricultural Sciences (IFA) - Yangambi	Institut facultaire des sciences agronomiques	IFA	Yangambi	Higher Institutes	
