= Action Africa Help International =

Kenyan non-governmental organization

- Formation: 1996
- Legal status: NGO
- Headquarters: Nachu Plaza, 7th Floor Kiambere Road, Upper Hill
- Website: https://www.actionafricahelp.org/

Action Africa Help International (AAH-I) is a non-governmental organization.

== Awards ==
In 2017 at the Juba Film Festival, the short film 'Waja Ta Jena', (translated 'Pain of a Child'), produced by AAH-I and Levi Lubari, won Best Video Scriptwriter, Best Cameraman, Best Video/Film Director and Best Video Editor.

== See also ==
- Refugee Law Project
- Juba Film Festival
