= UCBC =

UCBC is an acronym that may refer to:

- Université Chrétienne Bilingue du Congo
- University Centre at Blackburn College
- University of California, Behind Costco
- University College Boat Club (Durham), the rowing club of University College at Durham University in England
- University College Boat Club (Oxford), the rowing club of University College at Oxford University in England
