= University of Kalemie =

Public university in the DRC

- Université de Kalemie (French)
- Type: Public
- Established: 1 October 2004; 21 years ago
- Location: Kalemie, Democratic Republic of the Congo; 5.9137°S 29.199°E
- Campus: Urban
- Nickname: UNIKAL
- Website: University website

The University of Kalemie (UNIKAL) is a public university located in the city of Kalemie, in Tanganyika Province of the southeastern Democratic Republic of the Congo.

At its creation, it was an Extension of the University of Lubumbashi, then called University Centre of Kalemie (C.U.K.). As of 2012 it had 800 students in 6 faculties. Its president is Kisimba Kya Ngoy. Instruction is in French.

== History ==
The university was created 1 October 2004 as Kalemie Center University(C.U.K.), extension of the University of Lubumbashi, and became autonomous in 2010 following Ministerial order No. 157/MINESU/CABMIN/EBK/PK/2010 27 September 2010.

== Faculties ==
- Faculty of Agronomy
- Faculty of Law
- Faculty of Medicine
- Faculty of Social, Political and Administrative Sciences
- Faculty of Economics and Management
- Faculty of Public Health

== Research centres ==
- Internet room
- University Library

== See also ==
- Kalemie
- Katanga Province
- Education in the Democratic Republic of the Congo
- List of universities in the Democratic Republic of the Congo
