= Robert Hakiza =

Congolese researcher

- Citizenship: Uganda, Democratic Republic of the Congo
- Education: Catholic University of Bukavu, Oxford University
- Alma mater: Degree in Agriculture
- Awards: TED Fellow, Aspen Institute New Voices Fellow 2017, Obama Foundation emerging African Leader 2019
- Website: https://www.yarid.net/

Robert Hakiza is a Congolese researcher and founder of Young African Refugees for Integral Development (YARID) a community-based organization established by refugees in Uganda, operates a myriad of programs aimed at offering informal language instruction, facilitating Internet access, and providing vocational training to urban Kampala's refugee population.

== Early life and education ==
Hakiza was born in the Democratic Republic of Congo but has been living in Uganda since 2008. He holds a degree in Agriculture from the Catholic University of Bukavu. a certificate in forced migration from the International Summer School of Forced Migration of Oxford University.

== Career ==
In 2007, Hakiza founded Young African Refugees for Integral Development (YARID) in Uganda and is currently its Executive Director. The organization aims to offer refugees, orphans, and other displaced persons educational programs, accessible healthcare facilities, and skills training opportunities. Hakiza is also a founding member of the Refugee-Led Organizations Network and a founding and steering committee member of the Global Refugee Network (GRN) representing Sub-Saharan Africa.

YARID operates in three field offices located in Kampala, Kyaka II, and Palabek refugee settlements. Throughout 2022, the organization directly catered to over 8,000 refugees across these three field offices, focusing on improving access to education, fostering sustainable livelihoods, and ensuring refugee protection. They are consistently devoted to advocating for their rights and creating opportunities for refugees.

== Awards ==
He is a TED Fellow, Aspen Institute New Voices Fellow 2017, and The Obama Foundation emerging African Leader 2019.

On 23 February 2016, YARID became the first recipient of the Ockenden International Prize, an esteemed international prize that recognizes and supports projects that promote the self-reliance of refugees and displaced individuals. The prize, amounting to US$100,000 was awarded to the ‘Women’s Empowerment Project’ by Young African Refugees for Integral Development (YARID) from Kampala, Uganda. 2026 He received the Building Dream Impact Award Prepared by the Refugee Innovation Centre and Tomorrow Vijana.

== Publications ==
(Loan) cycles of innovation: researching refugee-run micro-finance. Authored by Robert Hakiza and Evan Easton-Calabria published in 2016.

Can Redistribution Change Policy Views? Aid and Attitudes toward Refugees. Authored by Travis Baseler, Thomas Ginn, Robert Hakiza, Helidah Ogude-Chambert, and Olivia Woldemikael. Journal of Political Economy, 2025.
