= University of Kamina =

Public university in the DRC

- Université de Kamina (French)
- Former names: University Centre of Kamina
- Type: Public
- Established: October 1, 2004 (21 years ago)
- Location: Kamina, Democratic Republic of the Congo; 8.7692°S 24.9712°E
- Campus: Urban
- Nickname: UNIKAM
- Website: University website

The University of Kamina (UNIKAM) is a public university in the Democratic Republic of the Congo, located in the province of Katanga, city of Kamina. At its creation, it was an Extension of the University of Lubumbashi, then called University Centre of Kamina (C.U.K.). Instruction is in French.

== History ==
The University was created 1 October 2004 as Kamina Center University(C.U.C.K.), extension of the University of Lubumbashi, and became autonomous in 2010 following Ministerial order No. 157/MINESU/CABMIN/EBK/PK/2010 27 September 2010.

== See also ==
- Kamina
- Katanga Province
- List of universities in the Democratic Republic of the Congo
- Education in the Democratic Republic of the Congo
