= University of Bandundu =

University in the Democratic Republic of the Congo

- Université de Bandundu (French)
- Former names: Bandundu Center University
- Type: Public
- Established: 1 October 2004; 21 years ago
- Location: Bandundu, Democratic Republic of the Congo
- Campus: Urban
- Nickname: UNIBAN
- Website: University website

The University of Bandundu (UB) is a public university in the Democratic Republic of the Congo, located in the province of Bandundu, city of Bandundu. At its creation, it was an extension of the University of Kinshasa, then called University Centre of Bandundu (C.U.B.). As of 2012 it had 800 students in six faculties. Instruction is in French.

== History ==
The University was created 1 October 2004 as Bandundu Center University(C.U.B.), extension of the University of Kinshasa, and became autonomous in 2010 following Ministerial order No. 157/MINESU/CABMIN/EBK/PK/2010 27 September 2010.

== See also ==
- City of Bandundu
- Bandundu Province
- List of universities in the Democratic Republic of the Congo
- Education in the Democratic Republic of the Congo
