= Young African Refugees for Integral Development =

Ugandan refugee organization

Young African Refugees for Integral Development (YARID)
- Formation: 2007
- Founder: Robert Hakiza
- Legal status: NGO
- Headquarters: Nsambya Gogonya, off Kabega Road, Kampala
- Coordinates: 0°17′51″N 32°35′23″E
- EXECUTIVE DIRECTOR: Robert Hakiza
- Website: https://www.yarid.org/

Young African Refugees for Integral Development (YARID) is a community-based organization formed by refugees in Uganda that operates a number of programs that provide informal language instruction, internet access, and vocational training to refugees in urban Kampala. The organization was founded in 2007 by Robert Hakiza, a Congolese refugee living in Uganda.

== Focus area ==
YARID aims to empower refugees, orphans, and other displaced persons by offering educational programs, accessible healthcare facilities, and skills training opportunities. Through its programmes, the organisation helps people who have faced adversity acquire the skills and knowledge needed to become self-reliant and participate in society.

== Geographical reach ==
YARID has three field offices in Kampala, Kyaka II, and Palabek refugee settlements. In 2022, the organization directly served over 8,000 refugees across these three field offices, addressing access to education, sustainable livelihoods, and refugee protection, and continually advocating for the rights and opportunities for refugees.

YARID is a registered NGO serving refugees in Uganda. The organization's work remains centered on community-driven solutions to build up fellow refugees on a resilient path.

== Awards ==
On 23 February 2016, the winner of the Ockenden International Prize was announced at the annual ceremony held at the University of Oxford. Ockenden International established this prize in 2012 with the aim of recognizing and supporting projects that promote the self-reliance of refugees and displaced individuals. That year, out of 42 entries from 25 countries, the US$100,000 prize was awarded to the Women's Empowerment Project run by YARID. Its founder, Robert Hakiza, originally a Congolese refugee who had sought asylum in Uganda approximately seven years earlier, had played a pivotal role in the organization's development and success as its director.

== See also ==
- Uganda Human Rights Commission
- Refugee Law Project
- Refugees in Uganda
