= Catholic University of Bukavu =

Private university in the DRC

- Université catholique de Bukavu
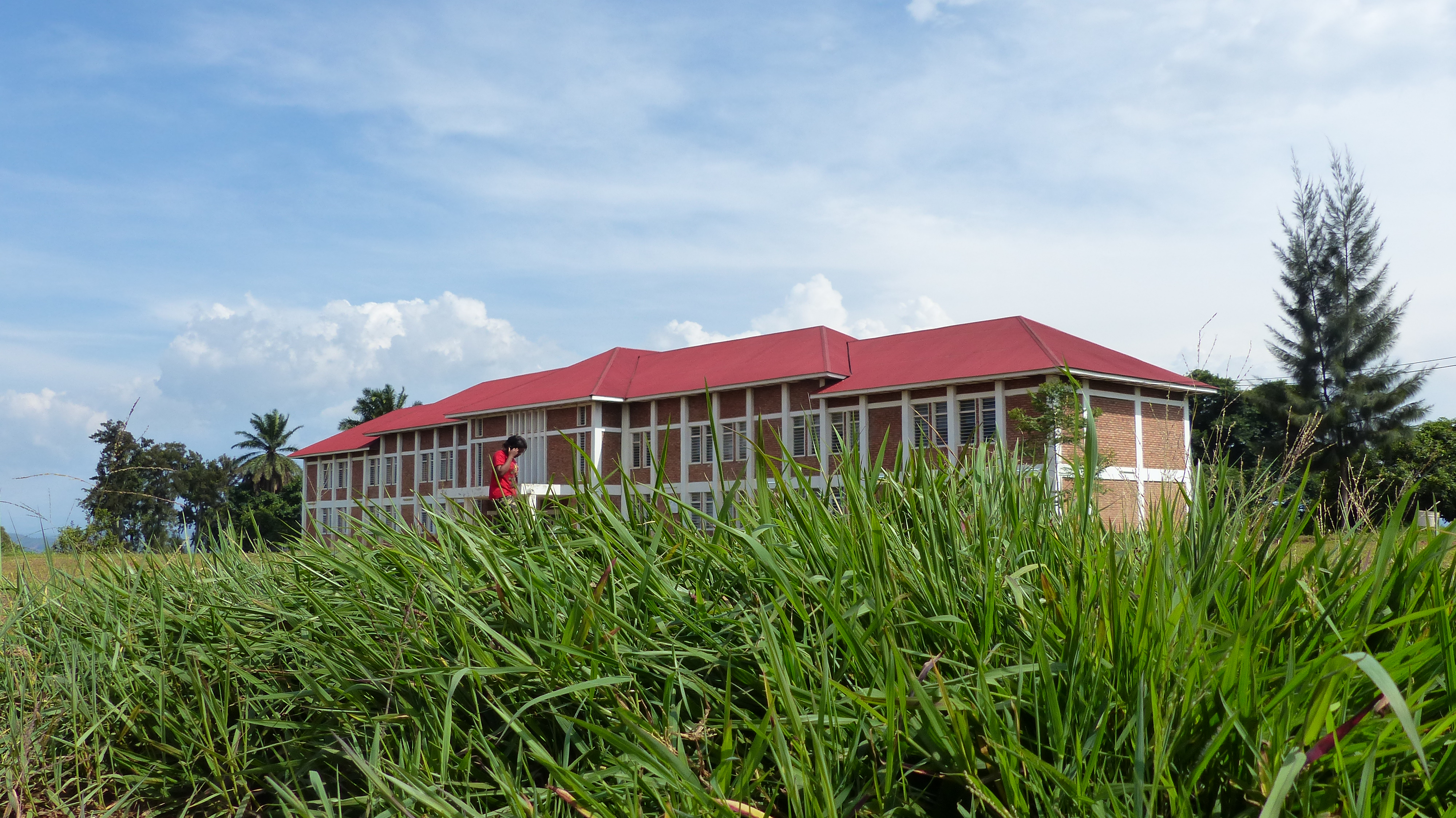
- Type: Private
- Established: 1989; 37 years ago
- Location: Bukavu; 2.505°S 28.84783°E

The Catholic University of Bukavu (French: Université Catholique de Bukavu) is a private university in Bukavu, Democratic Republic of the Congo. It is a member of the AUF.

== History ==
It was established in 1989.

== See also ==
- List of universities in the Democratic Republic of the Congo
- Education in the Democratic Republic of the Congo
