= University Shalom of Bunia =

Private university in the DRC

Shalom University of Bunia
- Université Shalom de Bunia
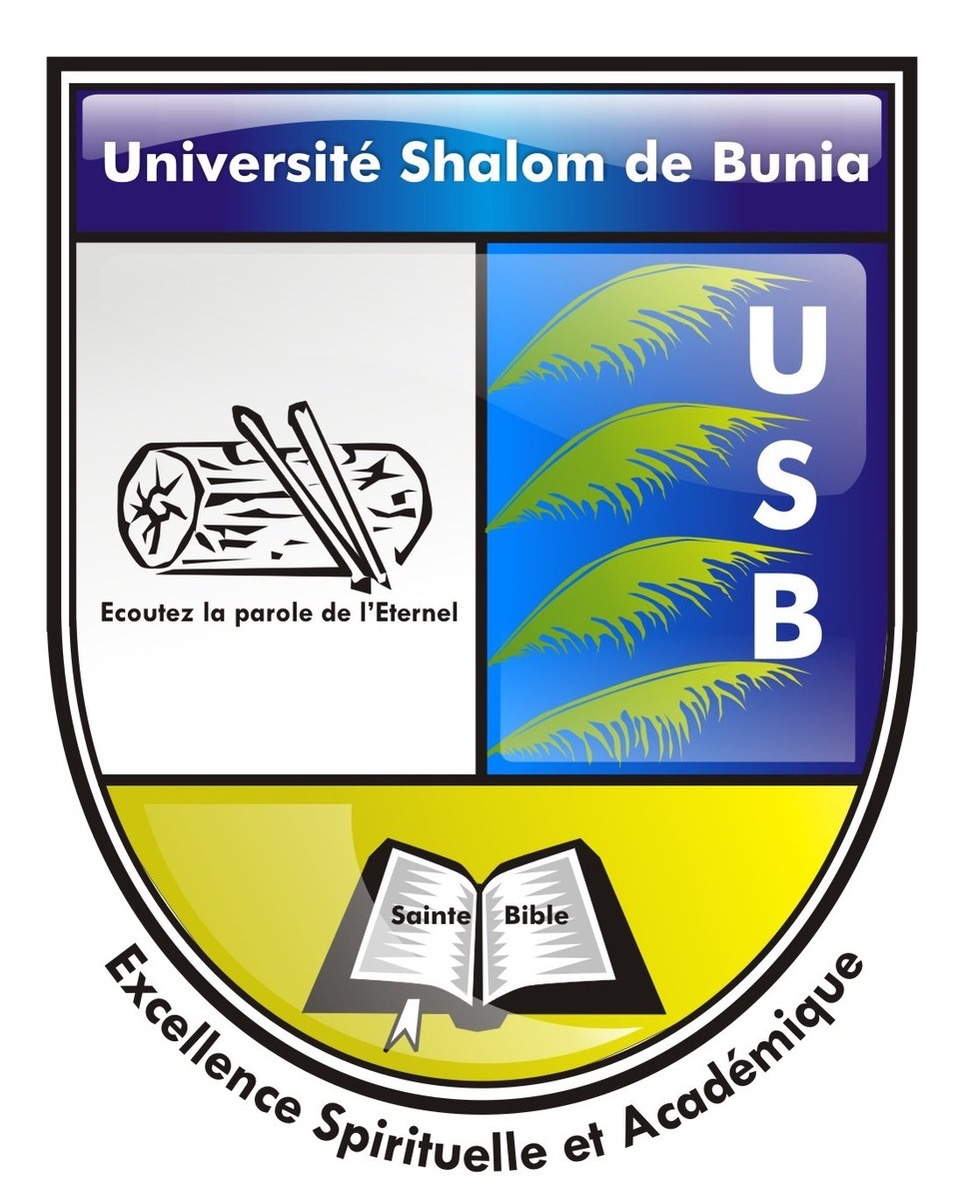
- Other name: USB
- Motto: Excellence Spirituelle et Académique pour la Transformation de la Société par Christ
- Motto in English: Spiritual and Academic Excellence for the Transformation of Society by Christ
- Type: Private
- Religious affiliation: Protestant Evangelical
- Rector: George Pirwoth Atido (since 2018)
- Students: 1100
- Location: Bunia, Ituri, Democratic Republic of Congo; 1.5534°N 30.2452°E
- Colors: Blue and yellow
- Website: unishabunia.org

Shalom University of Bunia (French: Université Shalom de Bunia), also known as USB, is a private Christian university located in the city of Bunia, in the Democratic Republic of Congo (DRC). With an enrolment of over 1100 students for the 2019–2020 academic year, it is one of the largest universities in the city of Bunia, along with Bunia University (UNIBU). It currently has six faculties offering 35 majors. It is one of 11 universities authorized to offer doctoral studies in the DRC.

== Campus ==
Shalom University is made up of two campuses. The main campus, Campus Southard, is 12 hectares (30 acres) located in the center of the city of Bunia. Campus Langford is 38 hectares (94 acres), located to the west of Bunia near the Bunia airport. Shalom's 58 buildings and numerous annexes provide 44 classrooms, 26 staff houses, 66 student apartments, a nursery, primary and secondary school complex of 2500 students, and one medical clinic.

== History ==
Shalom University was originally established as a theological institute in 1959 called Theological School of Northern Congo (École de Théologie au Congo du Nord - E.T.C.N.). In 1961 it opened its doors in Banjwade 65 kilometers north of Kisangani. Three years later it had to temporarily interrupt its operations and was forced to relocate to Bunia because of the 1964 Simba rebellion. In 1967 the school moved to the current location of its main campus.

The university continued to develop and in 1973 it changed its name to Institut Supérieur Théologique de Bunia (ISTB). It launched its first master's degree in theology in 1986. During the violent tribal fighting in Bunia during the Ituri Conflict, ISTB was seen as a neutral ground where warring tribes could meet and talk.

Then, in 2007, the school took its current form as Shalom University of Bunia, offering five faculties. The name Shalom (peace) was chosen because of the role the university played in the Ituri Conflict peace process.

In 2011, Shalom University began offering its first doctorate program within the School of Evangelical Theology, and in 2015 Shalom University launched its sixth faculty, the Faculty of Medicine.

In February 2018, violence reignited in the territory of Djugu, just north of Bunia. Armed militias burned 70 villages to the ground, killed hundreds, and displaced over 100 000. Shalom University again played an active role in diffusing hostilities by hosting a public debate production put on by Radio Okapi that involved local politicians and humanitarian workers addressing the violence and how to bring it to an end.

== Partnerships and accreditations ==
Shalom University is accredited and recognized by presidential decree by the government of the DRC. Its theological programs are also accredited by the Association for Christian Theological Education in Africa (ACTEA).

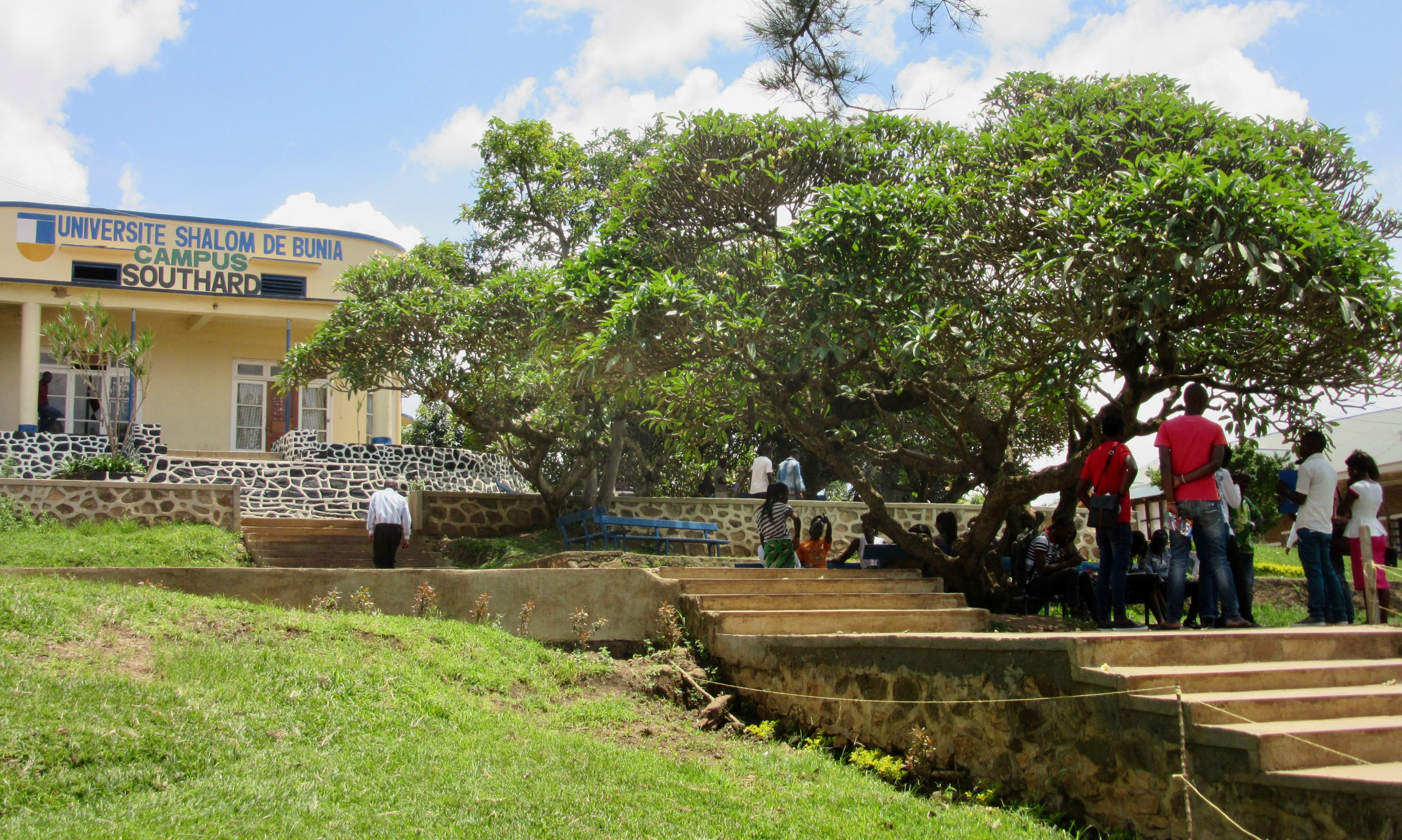
Campus Southard

Shalom University is the creation of five denominations in DRC: Emmanuel Community (founded by CMML), the Community of Baptist Churches of Eastern Congo (founded by WorldVenture), the Evangelical Community in the Center of Africa (founded by AIM International), the Evangelical Community of Christ in the Heart of Africa (founded by WEC International) and the Nation of Christ in Africa Community (founded by Crossworld and UFM Worldwide). These five denominations are full members of the university providing members for the board of directors.

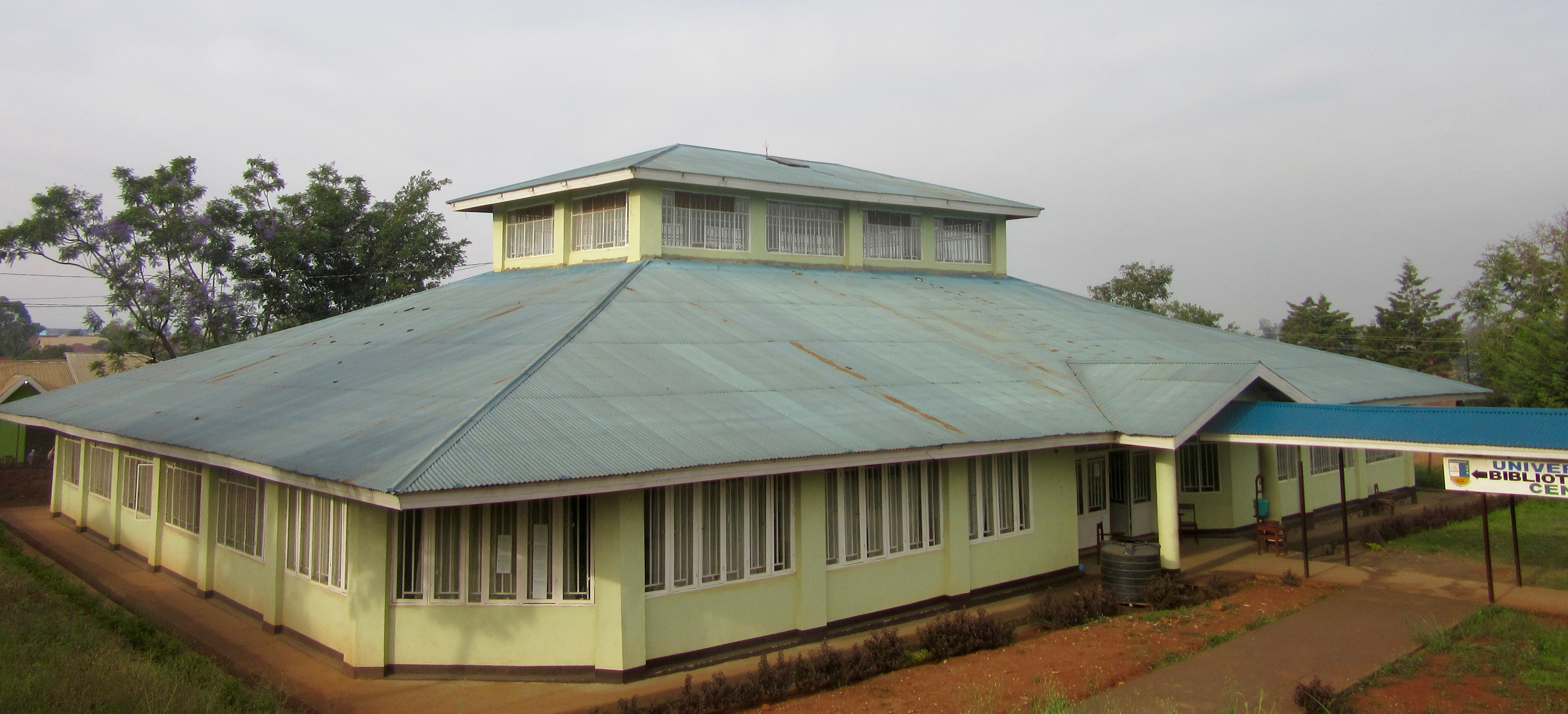
Alo Library

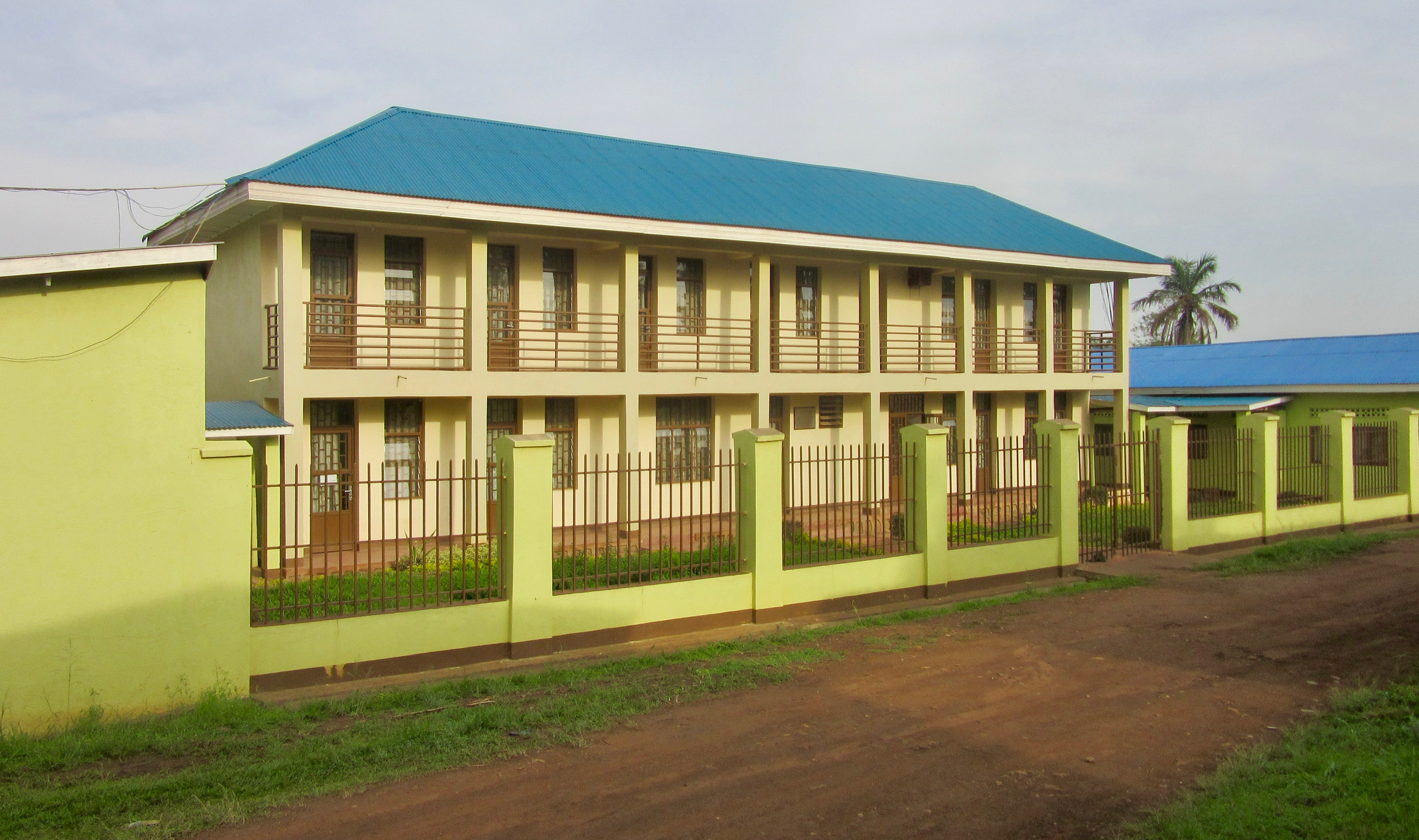
Muchmore Doctoral Center

In addition the following organizations partner with Shalom University: Langham Partnership, URCO, ACTEA, SIL International, SIM, Hilfe für Brüder, Development Associates International (DAI), TEEAL (The Essential Electronic Agricultural Library), Overseas Council, Christliche Fachkräfte International, and Engineering Ministries International. Shalom collaborates with SIL International for its major in Bible Translation. It collaborates with Development Associates International for its Master of Arts in Organizational Leadership, with the Agricultural Association for Development for its faculty of Agriculture and faculty of Development, and with Centre Médical Évangélique (CME) for its faculty of Medicine.

== COBAC ==
With its library of 47, 000 volumes, the largest library in Bunia, Shalom University spearheaded the development of the “Consortium of Academic Libraries of Congo” which was officially launched in June 2015. This consortium of 12 universities is the first of its kind in the Democratic Republic of Congo.

== Faculties ==
- Faculty of Agronomy
- Faculty of Medicine
- Faculty of Development Studies
- Faculty of Environmental Sciences
- Faculty of Evangelical Theology
- Faculty of Management and Administration

== See also ==
- List of universities in the Democratic Republic of the Congo
- Education in the Democratic Republic of the Congo
