= Christian Bilingual University of Congo =

University in Beni, Congo

Coordinates: 0°31.813′N 29°29.496′E

- Université Chrétienne Bilingue du Congo
- Other name: UCBC
- Motto: Love, Work, Faithfulness
- Established: 2006; 20 years ago
- Academic affiliations: Congo Initiative
- Rector: David Kasali
- Dean: Honore Bunduki
- Students: 300
- Location: Beni, Democratic Republic of Congo
- Website: ucbc.org

UCBC (French: Université Chretienne Bilingue du Congo, English: Christian Bilingual University of Congo) is a Christian bilingual university in development in the town of Beni, Democratic Republic of the Congo.

== Organization ==
The development of UCBC is supported the Congo Initiative (CI-UCBC), a Christian charity in Wisconsin.

== Educational activities ==
=== Preparatory year ===
CI/UCBC aligns preparatory year with its academic program. The curriculum focuses on teaching English as means of communication and medium of instruction; computer skills are taught to bring students into the modern world of computer literacy for research and communication; general courses, work methodology, and CI-UCBC philosophy and values are also taught to prepare students for studies at UCBC.

== See also ==
- List of universities in the Democratic Republic of the Congo
- Education in the Democratic Republic of the Congo
