= Mulungwishi =

Coordinates: 10°47′S 26°38′E

Mulungwishi is a community in Haut-Katanga province of the Democratic Republic of the Congo. It is located 100 miles northwest of Lubumbashi. Bishop John M. Springer and his wife established a mission station there in 1918. The United Methodist Church founded the Mulungwishi Seminary in 1951.
