= African Institute for Future Studies =

Research institution in the Congo

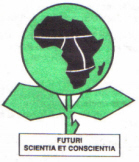
- Other name: INADEP
- Motto: Observatoire et Laboratoire du Futur Africain
- Type: Public
- Established: 1989; 37 years ago
- Head: Mgr. T. Tshibangu Tshishiku, died 29 December 2021 ; Director of Continuity : Bilolo wa Kaluka, Mubabinge
- Location: Kinshasa, Congo
- Campus: Gombe-Lingwala in Congo and Freising/Munich in Germany

The African Institute for Future Studies, also known as Panafrican Institute for Future Studies or INADEP, is a research institution and university founded in 1989 by the President of Zaire (present day Democratic Republic of the Congo) (Ordinance 89–287 of 9 November 1989). It is located in Kinshasa, Congo and it has an International Campus in Marzling-Freising, Germany. In addition to subsidiary departments that are funded for the future studies or for the exploration of the future, INADEP has funded a Centre for the exploration of the past (for Retrospective Studies), named Diop's Center for Egyptology.

INADEP is a member of the National Research Council of Congo and one of the National Government Organizations devoted exclusively to scientific research and to the training of new researchers.

== Origin ==
In 1976, the United Nations, through its Economic Commission for Africa (EGA) launched the idea of founding an African Institute for Studies of the Future. In 1977, the IXth Conference for ECA ministers defined the objectives of the institute. In 1980, Professor Mahdi Elmandjra conducted a feasibility study entitled Report on the Desirability and Feasibility of Establishing an African Institute for Advanced public Policy Analysis and Future Studies. In 1981, the OAU summit held in Nairobi approved the idea of founding an Institute for decolonising the future. In 1982, the Conference for EGA Ministers approved the idea of establishing the institute. In 1987 the book Reconquering the Future was published at the request of UNDP.

== Foundation ==
In 1985, the International Symposium on Africa and its Future thinks it is appropriate to start an African Centre for Studies of the Future. President Mobutu Sese Seko agrees to the idea and offers to provide initial infrastructural facilities in Kinshasa.

Ordinance 89–287 of 9 November 1989 prescribed the foundation of a public institution called Institut Africain d'Etudes Prospectives (INADEP) , and in 1990 the Center for Egyptology was added. The chairman of the Centre for Egyptology is Mubabinge Bilolo.

== Objectives ==
The institute is an Africa-oriented study centre and, as such, pursues the following main objectives:

- Provide institutional facilities for long-term research on international, political, cultural, economic, sociological, and technical modifications to the African or world situation in the present or in the future
- assess strategies, indicate the various options available, and offer a just and balanced picture of the future as well as propose directives for a planned realisation of the objectives proposed

== Support ==
The INADEP receives support and encouragement from international institutions such as UNDP, OAU, EGA, UNESCO, UNICEF, ABDA, ABD, EEC, and the World Bank. It also receives support from specialised centres in France, Great Britain, Germany, the United States, Scandinavian Countries, Japan, and the Soviet Union.

== Programme ==
=== Immediate actions ===
The programme includes a campaign for the cohesion of African countries and for obtaining of assistance expected from international organisations.

=== Departments of the institute ===
- "Département de Prospectives et de Recherches sur l'Intégration Africaine" /DPRIA with 10 Research Units
- "Centre C.A. Diop d'Égyptologie et du Devenir des Civilisations Africaines" /CDEDCA with 6 Research Units
- "Centre de Formation et d'Initiation à la Culture, aux Prospectives-Rétropspectives et aux Défis de l'Avenir"
- "Chaire T.T. Tshibangu pour l'Étude de la Religion Africaine et le Pilotage des Espaces Multiculturels"
- Documentation and basic equipment department
- Centre for E-Learning and computerised data

== Activities ==
- Prospective Studies, Evolution of the African Union,
- Monitoring of the African Integration Progress
- Retrospective Studies: Egyptology and African Cultures
- Geopolitical Studies
- Analysis and definition of Main Directions of development
- Bibliologie
- "Centre de Documentation sur l'Intégration Africaine"
- Training by means of conferences, retraining and in-service sessions, short courses, and other means
- Organisation of colloquia and symposia
- Publication of "Publications Universitaires Africaines" /PUA and Editions Universitaires Africaines /EDUAF
