= University of Kisangani =

Public university in Kisangani, DRC

Coordinates: 0.5138°N 25.1762°E

- Université de Kisangani
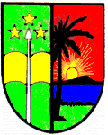
- Motto: Scientia splendet et conscientia
- Type: Public
- Established: 1963; 63 years ago
- Rector: Prof. Dr. Faustin Toengaho Lokundo
- Faculty: 381 (2007)
- Students: 6,058 (2007)
- Location: Kisangani, Democratic Republic of the Congo
- Website: www.unikis.ac.cd

The University of Kisangani (UNIKIS) is located in the city of Kisangani in the Democratic Republic of the Congo. It was founded in 1963 by Protestant missionaries as the Free University of the Congo (French: Université libre du Congo, ULC); it was transformed into part of the National University of Zaire in 1971, and in 1981 was separated from that National University, along with the University of Kinshasa and the University of Lubumbashi, assuming its present identity as the University of Kisangani. Its president is Professor Dr. Toengaho Lokundo.

== History ==
The University of Kisangani was founded in 1963, by the Congo Protestant Council, a coalition of Protestant churches operating in the Congo. The university's original name was the Free University of the Congo, and began with 50 students and six full-time professors.

Early critics accused the founders, a small group of American Protestant missionaries, of trying to create a counterweight to Belgian and Catholic Church influence in the new country. The university did receive some funding from various Protestant groups, but the new Congolese government and the governments of West Germany and the Netherlands also contributed.

In February 2019 it was reported that UNIKIS students had rioted and attacked academic staff and local authorities.

== Faculties and divisions ==
There are eight faculties at the University:

- Faculty of Arts and Humanities
- Faculty of Law
- Faculty of Economics and Management
- Faculty of Social Sciences Policy and Administrative
- Faculty of Sciences
  - The following subjects are available to study in the Faculty of Science: mathematics, biology, chemistry.
- Faculty of Psychology and Educational Sciences
- Faculty of Medicine and Pharmacy
  - The following subjects are available to study in the faculty of medicine: biological medicine, public health, pharmacy.

== See also ==
- List of universities in the Democratic Republic of the Congo
- Education in the Democratic Republic of the Congo
