= Refugee Law Project =

Non-governmental organization

- Formation: 1999-02-26
- Website: https://www.refugeelawproject.org/

The Refugee Law Project (RLP) is a human rights organization and NGO that was established in 1999 as an outreach project of the school of Law of Makerere University to address refugee rights in Uganda.

Its creation was as a result of an extensive research project that observed that despite Uganda's good ratings as one of the best host countries for refugees, refugees did not fully enjoy their rights as enshrined in domestic and international law. Thus RLP roots for all people to enjoy their human rights irrespective of their legal status.

RLP empowers asylum seekers, refugees, deportees, IDPs and host communities to enjoy rights and lead dignified lives.

== Focus ==
RLP focuses on the promotion of protection, wellbeing and dignity of forced migrants and their hosts. It also empowers migrant communities and forced migrants to fight against injustices in policy law and practice.

It furthermore influences international outlook on issues that concern forced migration, justice and peace.

Additionally, it addresses the civil and criminal issues that vulnerable refugees confront in their stay with their Ugandan host. It roots for human advancement, social healing, access to justice, conflicts documentation, and advocacy for Youth and women participation.

== Geographical reach ==
The Refugee Law Project is active in the districts of Adjumani, Lamwo, Kiryandongo, Kitgum, Pader, Gulu, Omoro, Amuru, Arua, Kumi, Luwero, Kasese, Bundibugyo, Kampala, Hoima, Mbarara, Isingiro, and Kabarole districts.
