= Education in the Democratic Republic of the Congo =

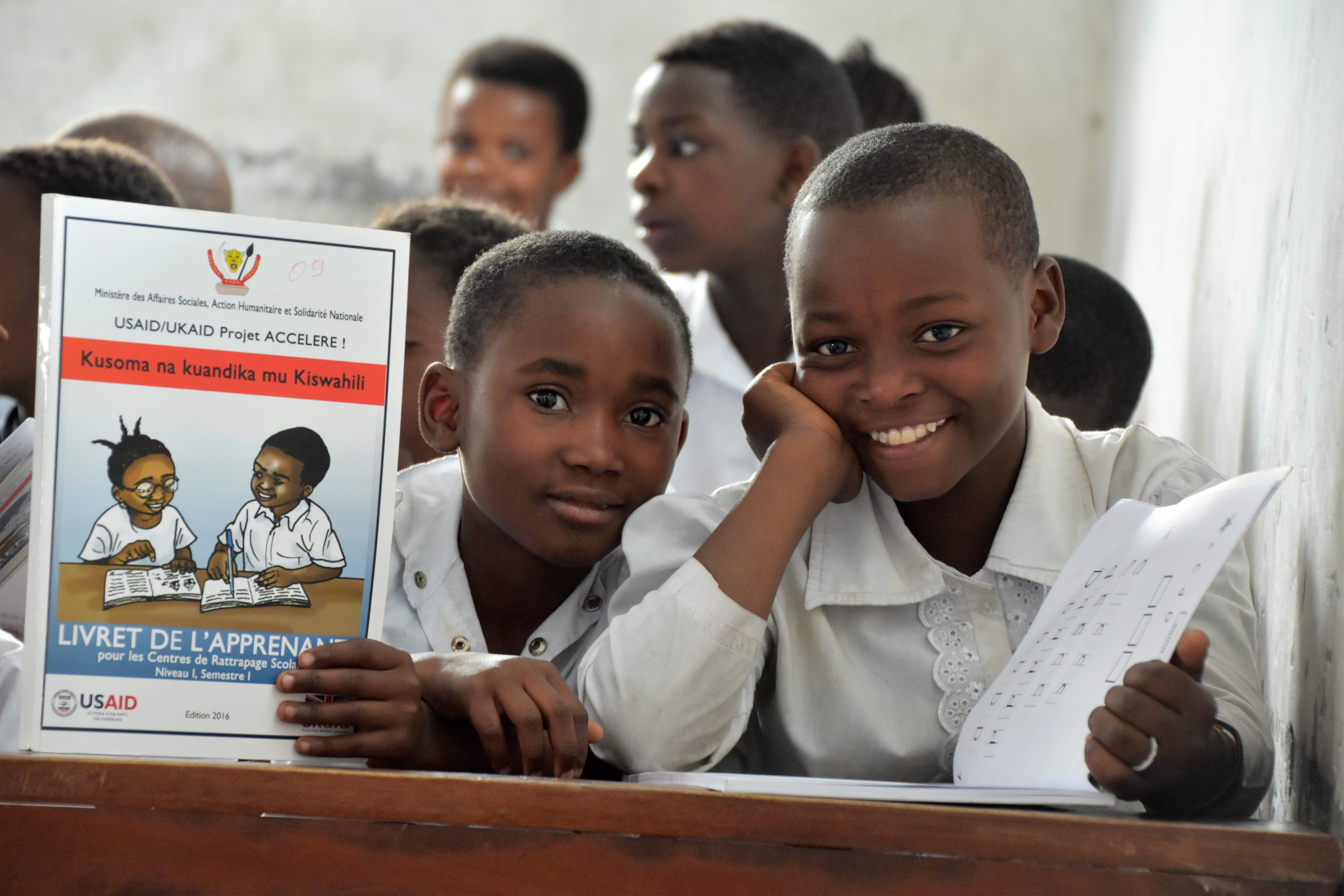
Classroom in Goma

Education in the Democratic Republic of the Congo is administered jointly by two ministries — the Ministère de l'Enseignement Primaire, Secondaire et Professionnel (MEPSP) and the Ministère de l'Enseignement Supérieur et Universitaire (MESU) — which oversee primary and secondary education, higher education, and social and vocational training.

The education system comprises six years of primary education followed by six years of secondary education, culminating in the Diplôme d'État, equivalent to the French baccalauréat, which grants access to higher education. Tertiary education follows a tiered progression — Graduat, Licence, and doctoral studies — offered through public universities, higher pedagogical institutes (Instituts Supérieurs Pédagogiques), and technical institutes (Instituts Supérieurs Techniques). The administration involves a hybrid partnership between the state, religious networks, and parents. Religious organizations, mainly Catholic, Protestant, Kimbanguist, and Islamic, play a key role in managing schools under state supervision, collectively accounting for nearly 80% of primary and 75% of secondary institutions.

In September 2019, the Congolese government introduced a landmark policy guaranteeing free public primary education nationwide.

== Historical background ==
=== Colonial period ===
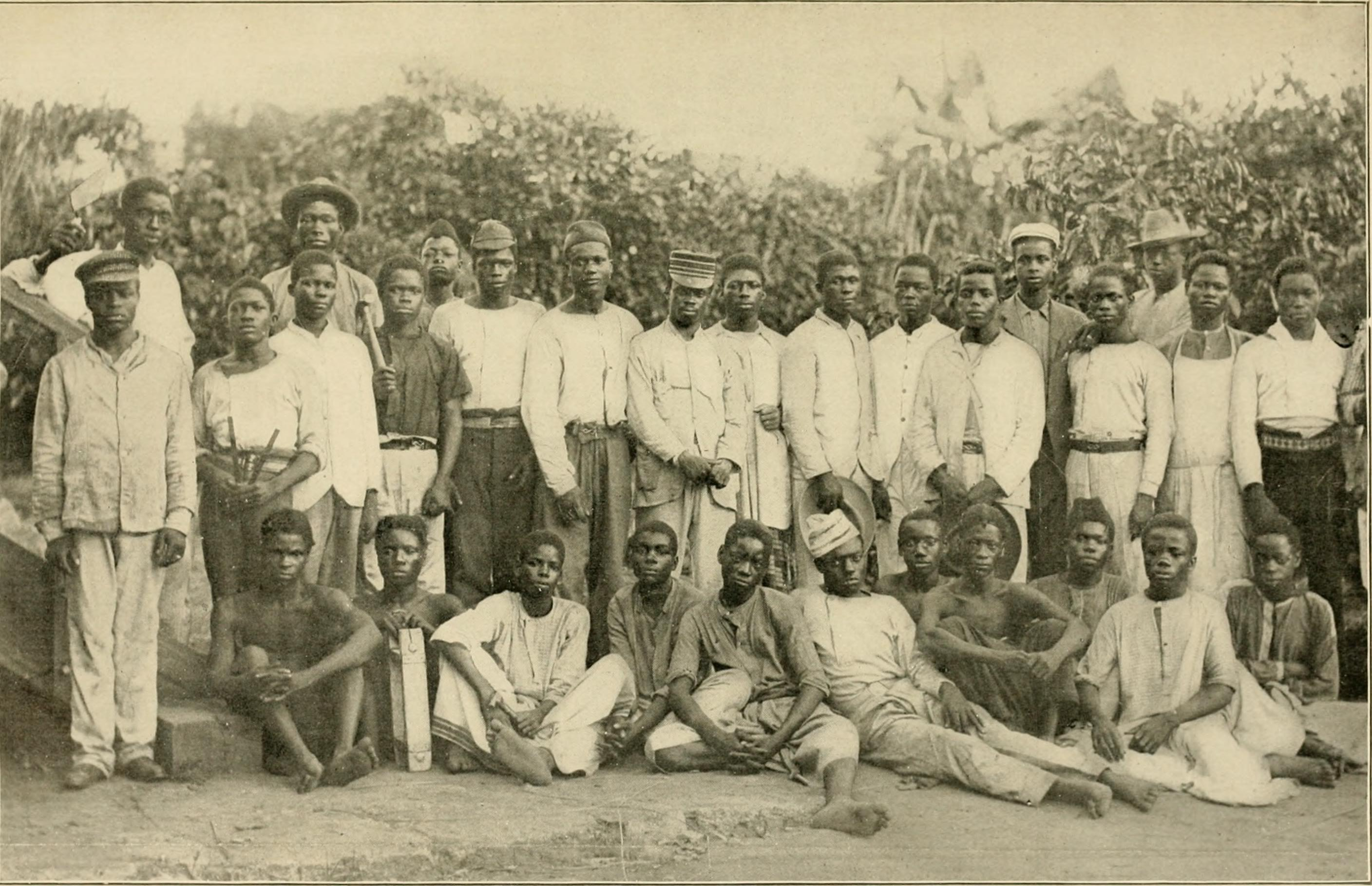
Group of Congolese students and workers at a mission station, photographed in 1897, Congo Free State

The first organized attempt to provide education to Congolese children was initiated by Abbé Van Impe, director of the Saint Louis de Gonzague Institute. On 15 July 1888, he communicated to Edmond van Eetvelde, the administrator of foreign affairs of the Congo Free State, his intention to personally finance the education of two Congolese children. On 12 July 1890, King Leopold II of Belgium signed a decree establishing the first schools in Mulueba (Tanganyika) and Boma (Kongo Central). A subsequent decree, dated 4 March 1892, authorized religious and philanthropic associations to admit abandoned children under the guardianship of the State for their training. These institutions, known as school colonies, resembled military schools due to the involvement of public officers who oversaw physical education and discipline. In 1895, missionaries, particularly from the Jesuit Order, established farm-chapels or chapel-schools to provide religious, agricultural, and vocational instruction alongside these school colonies.

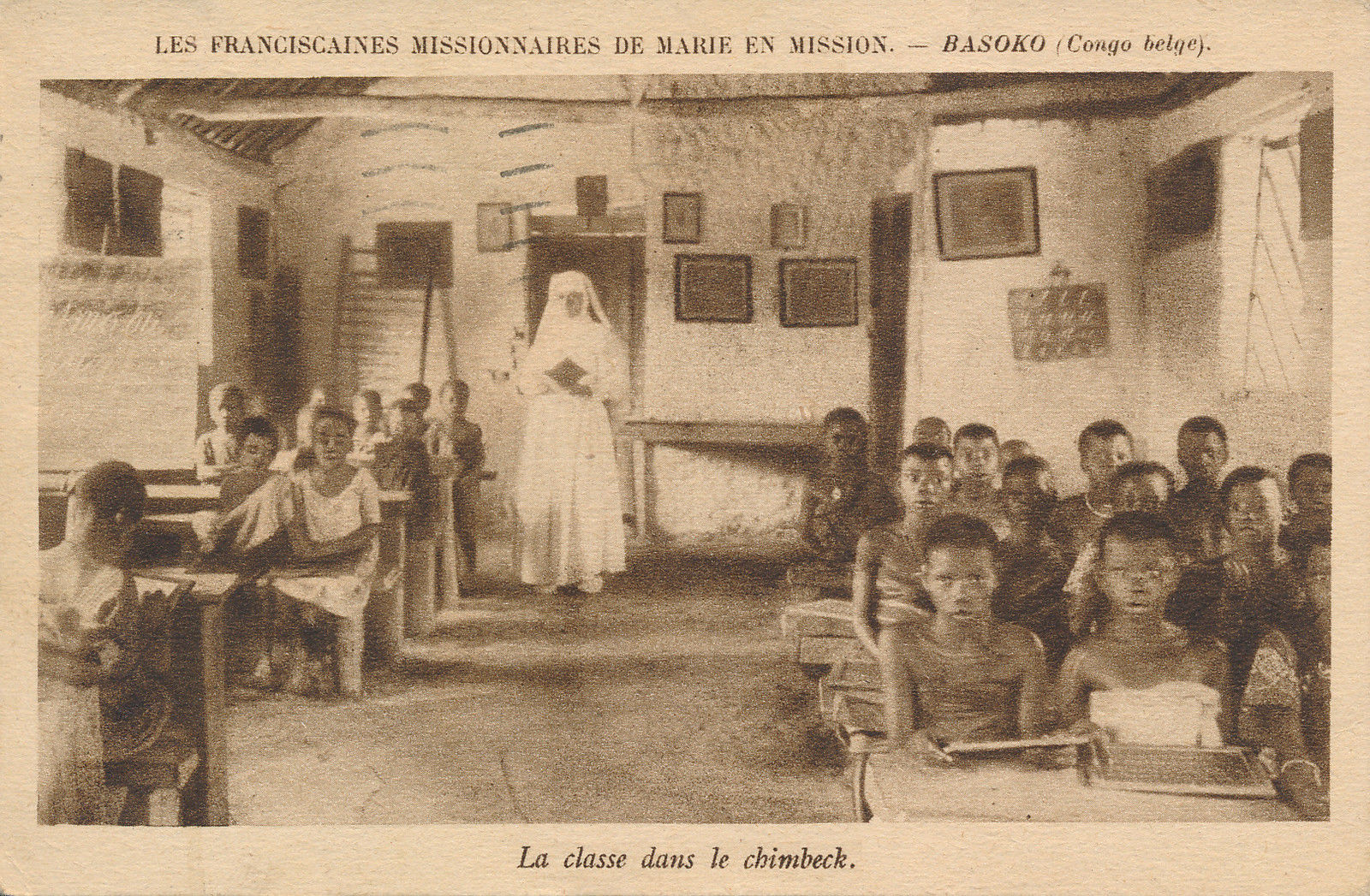
A classroom scene in Basoko, Belgian Congo, led by the Franciscan Missionaries of Mary, around 1930.

On 18 October 1908, Congo was formally annexed as a Belgian colony. This period saw the progressive establishment of official congregational schools. At that time, the organization and legislation of schools were governed by conventions and charters, which granted freedom of education to all, resulting in the emergence of institutions referred to as school groups. Following World War I, the colonial State began to regulate education. In 1924, the regulation titled Projet de l'organisation de l'enseignement libre au Congo belge avec le concours des missions nationales ("project for the organization of free education in the Belgian Congo with the participation of national missions") was enacted, defining objectives, types of schools to be created, curricula, and the organization of school facilities. A subsequent reform in 1938 sought to standardize school types and durations, distinguishing between boys' schools, which lasted six years, and girls' schools, which lasted five years. However, implementation was interrupted by World War II. In 1948, the regulation Organisation de l'enseignement libre subsidié pour les indigènes avec le concours des sociétés de missions chrétiennes ("organization of subsidized free education for indigenous people with the participation of Christian missionary societies") was introduced, aiming "to prepare the indigenous population to strengthen their environment, interests, and community, and to select students capable of forming an intellectual elite".

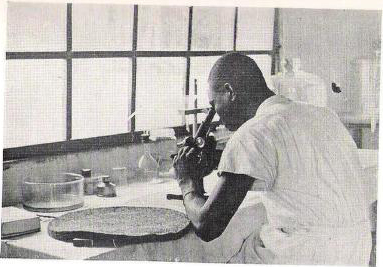
A Congolese medical student in training, Belgian Congo, 1943

In 1954, the Minister of Colonies, Auguste Buisseret, established official schools for Congolese children, known as athénées or secular schools. These institutions were distinct from those previously created by Robert Godding in 1945 and 1948, which admitted only white children. Buisseret's initiative provoked what became known as the "school war", as Protestant and Catholic schools united to defend their programs and improve teachers' working conditions. In response, Catholic missionaries founded Lovanium University in Kinshasa. In 1956, Buisseret imposed the Belgian curriculum on official primary schools and established the Official University of the Congo (now University of Lubumbashi) in Lubumbashi to compete with Catholic institutions. In 1963, Protestant missionaries founded the Free University of the Congo (now University of Kisangani) in Kisangani.

=== Post-independence ===
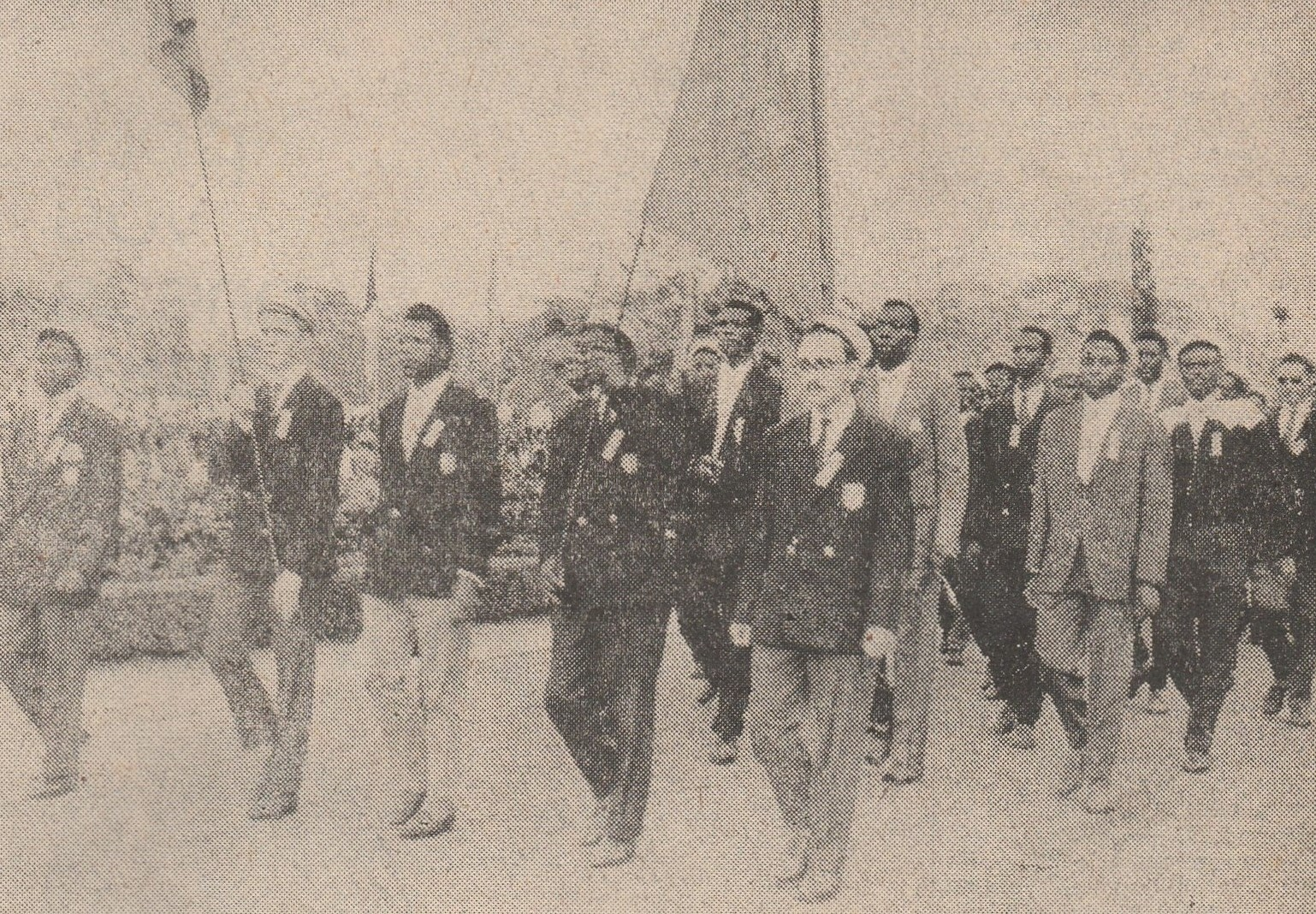
Lovanium University students marching during the Independence Day celebration on 30 June 1960.

Following independence on 30 June 1960, education in the Democratic Republic of the Congo experienced significant expansion. At independence, public expenditure on education was high, representing roughly 30 percent of total public expenditure. In 1960, an estimated 68% of adults in developing countries had never attended school, a figure that fell to 37% by 2000. The newly independent Congolese authorities faced considerable challenges in organizing a national educational system, as the existing Belgian framework was considered overly rigid and inflexible.

In 1971, universities in the country were consolidated into the National University of Zaire. On 26 February 1977, a management agreement for national schools was signed between religious institutions and the State, represented by the State Commissioner for National Education. The organization and legislation of schools were subsequently codified in the Framework Law on National Education of 22 September 1986. By the 1990s, the country faced a severe education crisis. In 1991, Zaire convened the Sovereign National Conference (Conférence Nationale Souveraine), held from 7 August 1991 to 6 December 1992, which established a commission to examine issues related to education.

In 1993, following the paralysis of the Zairean government, the responsibility for paying teachers was transferred entirely to parents. Despite ongoing challenges in the quality and quantity of education, demand for schooling remained high. Parents seeking improved educational opportunities for their children, in collaboration with school administrators, adopted a system of payments referred to as "teacher bonuses", distinguishing these contributions from salaries, which were formally the responsibility of the State.

== System structure ==
=== Educational stages ===
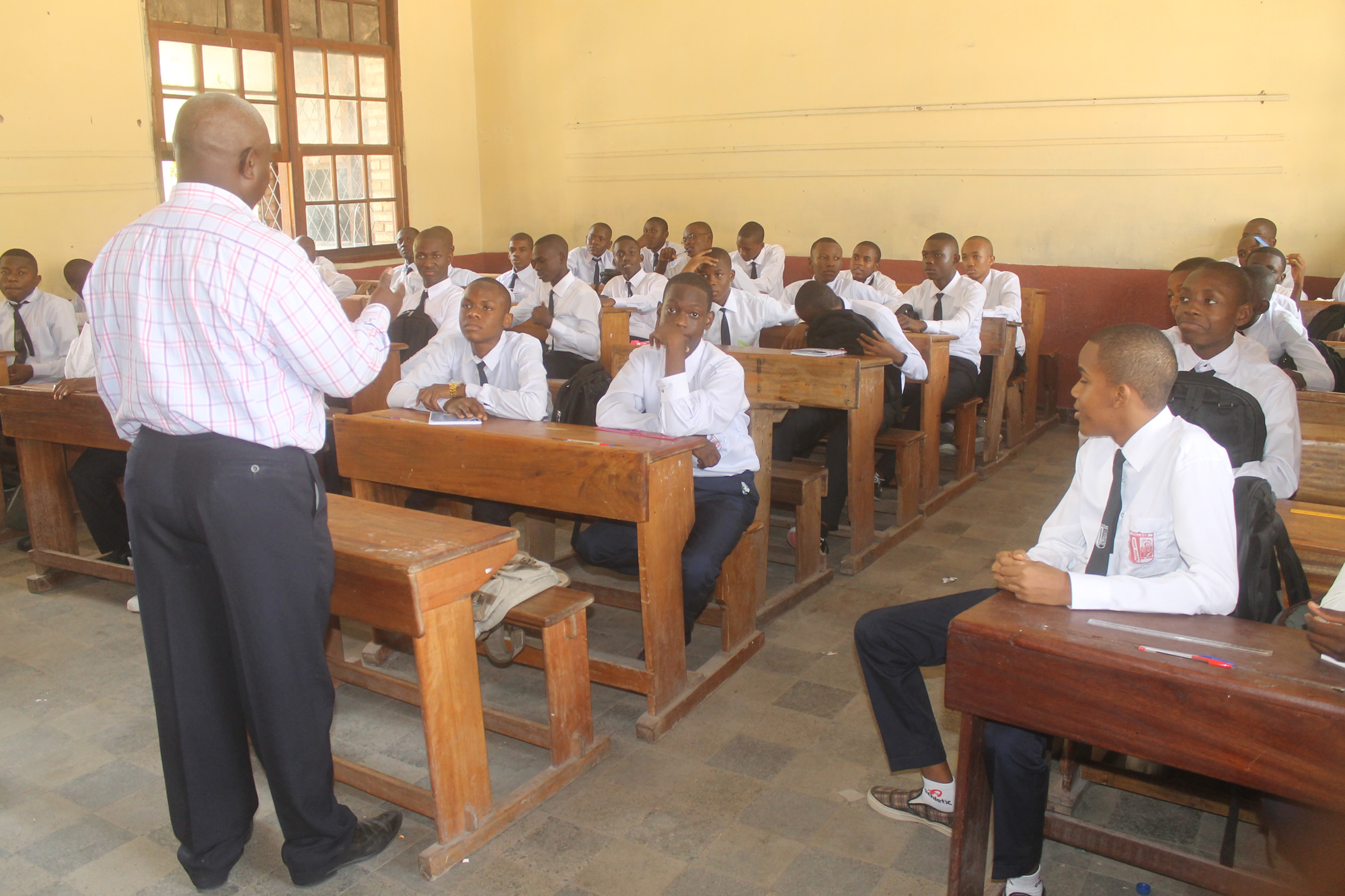
A view of a classroom at the Collège Saint-Joseph in Gombe, Kinshasa.

The educational system is largely modeled on the colonial Belgian system, with six years of primary education followed by six years of secondary education. Primary education typically spans the ages of six to twelve and concludes with the Certificat d'Études Primaires (CEP). Secondary education is organized into lower and upper cycles and divided into tracks, including general humanities (classical or modern), technical, commercial, and vocational studies. Completion of secondary education awards the Diplôme d'État (State Diploma), equivalent to the French baccalauréat, which permits access to either non-university higher education programs or university studies. Higher education follows a tiered structure, beginning with the Graduat (three years), followed by the Licence (two additional years), and postgraduate studies, including the DEA (Diplôme d'Études Approfondies) or doctoral programs.

Level of study	Type of Institution	Theoretical age (years)	Minimum entry requirement	Duration (years)	Certificate/diploma awarded
Primary	Primary	6–11	None	6	Primary school certificate
Secondary	General	12–17	Primary school certificate (Certificat d'études primaires)	6	State diploma of secondary education (Diplôme d'Etat d'études secondaires du cycle long, long cycle) (Note: Students graduating from normal schools (short cycle) obtain the Brevet d'Institut ("teaching certificate"), while those from the long cycle obtain the State Diploma in Pedagogy, which qualifies them to teach in primary school.)
	Normal				
	Technical				
	Vocational	12–16		5	Professional skills certificate/Certificate of professional aptitude (Brevet/Certificat d'aptitude professionnelle)
University	University	18–20/22	Diplôme d'État (long cycle)	1st cycle — 3 years	Bachelor's degree (Graduat)
				2nd cycle — 2 years	Master's degree (Licence) (Note: In human and veterinary medicine, this cycle lasts three years and leads to the title of Doctor of Medicine/Doctor of Veterinary Medicine.)
				3rd cycle — 2 years	Postgraduate diploma/Doctorate (Diplôme d'Études Supérieures)
			Higher Education Diploma (Diplôme d'études supérieures)	4–7 years	Doctorate
Higher Education	Higher Pedagogical Institute (Institut Supérieur Pédagogique; ISP)	18–20/22	Diplôme d'État (long cycle)	1st cycle — 3 years	Bachelor's in applied pedagogy (Graduat en pédagogie appliquée) (Note: Qualified to teach in the last two years of secondary education.)
				2nd cycle — 2 years	Master's in applied pedagogy (Licence en pédagogie appliquée)
	Higher Technical Institute (Institut Supérieur Technique; IST)	18–20/22	Diplôme d'État (long cycle)	1st cycle — 3 years	Technical engineer (Ingénieur Technicien)
				2nd cycle — 2 years	Engineer (Ingénieur)

In principle, primary education enrolls children aged 6–11; the first cycle of secondary education includes students aged 12–13; the second cycle consists of those aged 14–17; and the first cycle of higher education includes students aged 18–20. Repeating a grade is legally permitted only once at each two-year level.

=== Administration of primary and secondary education ===
==== Central government and the Ministry of Education ====
From 1997 to 2003, the DRC had a single Ministry of Education overseeing three subsectors, each led by a Secretary-General: Primary and Secondary Education (Enseignement Primaire et Secondaire; EPS), Higher and University Education (Enseignement Supérieur et Universitaire; ESU), and Scientific and Technological Research (Recherche Scientifique et Technologique). In 2003, the ministry was split into two separate entities: the Ministry of Primary, Secondary, and Vocational Education (Ministère de l'Enseignement Primaire, Secondaire et Professionnel; MEPSP) and the Ministry of Higher Education and University Research (Ministère de l'Enseignement Supérieur et Universitaire; MESU). MEPSP became the primary authority responsible for coordinating policies, curricula, teacher qualifications, and overall administration of primary and secondary schools.

At the central level, MEPSP oversees school standards, teacher deployment, examinations, and payroll systems. One of its key administrative services is the Teacher Payroll and Control Service (Service de contrôle et de la paie des enseignants; SECOPE), created in 1985 to regularize the teacher payroll system. SECOPE manages personnel, maintains a comprehensive database of teachers and schools, monitors standards, and can propose school closures or sanctions.

==== Provincial ====
The provincial administration has an important but sometimes restricted role in education. Each province is headed by a governor responsible for general administrative oversight across sectors, including education. The provincial Secretary-General is represented by a Provincial Division Chief (Proved), who reports to MEPSP on technical matters but operates under the governor's administrative control. Below the provincial level, the Proved is represented by Subdivision Chiefs (sub-Proved), whose departments cover personnel, finances, pedagogy, and planning. In practice, these departments often lack adequate staffing and resources, which limits their effectiveness in managing education.

Provincial authorities have the power to coordinate school operations and oversee budgetary allocations to provincial offices. However, in practice, central-level expenditures, especially teacher salaries, dominate financial control. This often places real authority over many schools, teachers, and examinations in the hands of the central administration rather than in those of local or provincial entities.

==== Religious networks ====
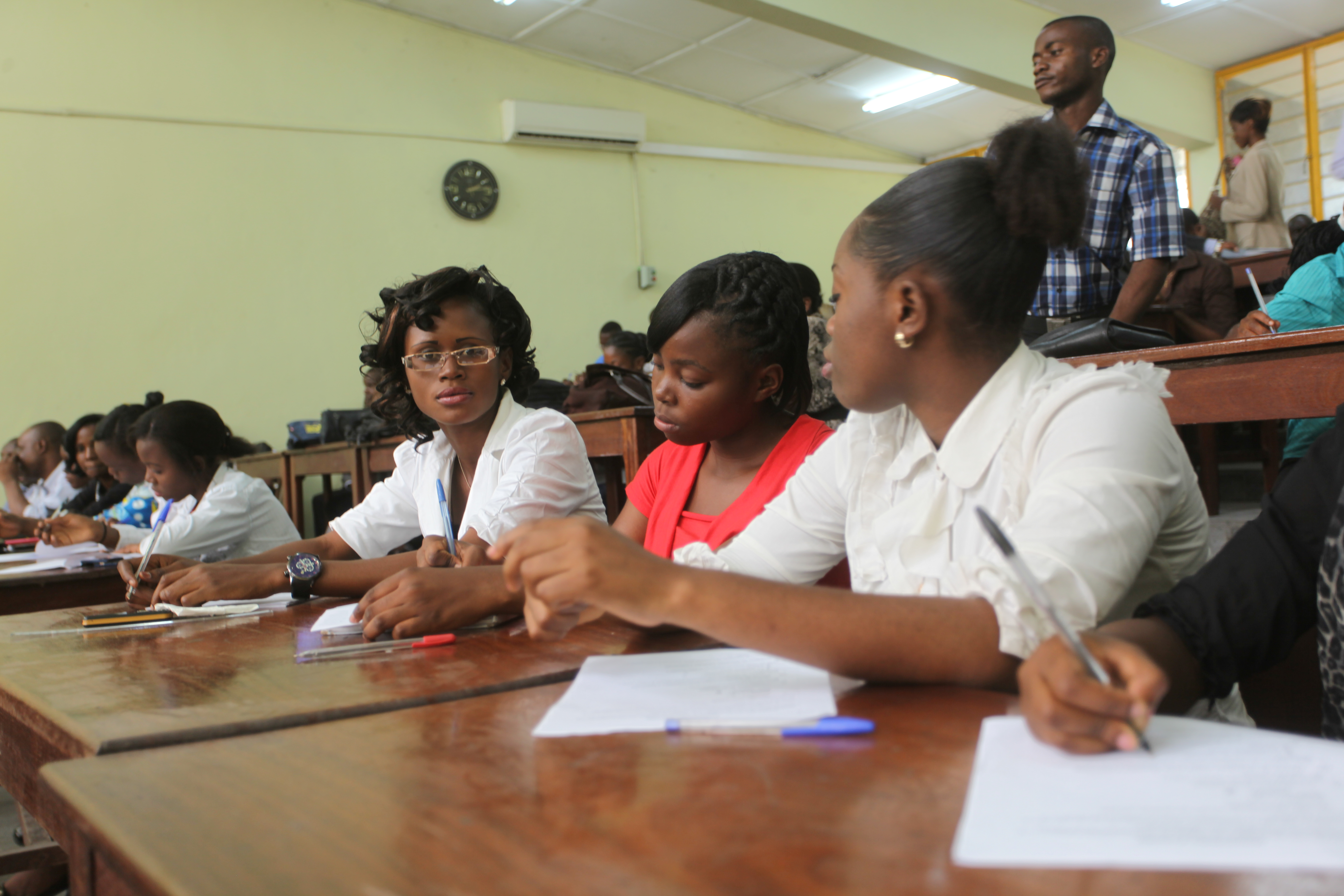
Faculty of Economics and Development students at the Catholic University of Congo

Religious congregations are the second major player in education administration. The division of responsibilities between the State and the Churches has been a longstanding source of ambiguity. Following the nationalization of private schools in 1974, many religious schools were returned to Church control in 1977. At that time, the State signed agreements with the four main religious congregations: Roman Catholic, Protestant, Kimbanguist, and Islamic, mandating that these schools follow government directives on curricula, class sizes, teacher qualifications and salaries, and the national evaluation system. Although the schools remained State property, their daily management was entrusted to the Churches, creating a shared responsibility in which the State acted as the organizing authority while the Churches handled operations on the ground. In 1986, the legal framework shifted further when the Ministry of Education was given overarching authority to coordinate all educational institutions, without specific mention of Church networks. To ensure formal coordination, the government and the Church networks established the National Education Council (Conseil National de l'Education) as a platform for dialogue and oversight. Despite these reforms, internal Church administrative structures remained in place, resulting in a complex hierarchy at the national, provincial, and local levels.

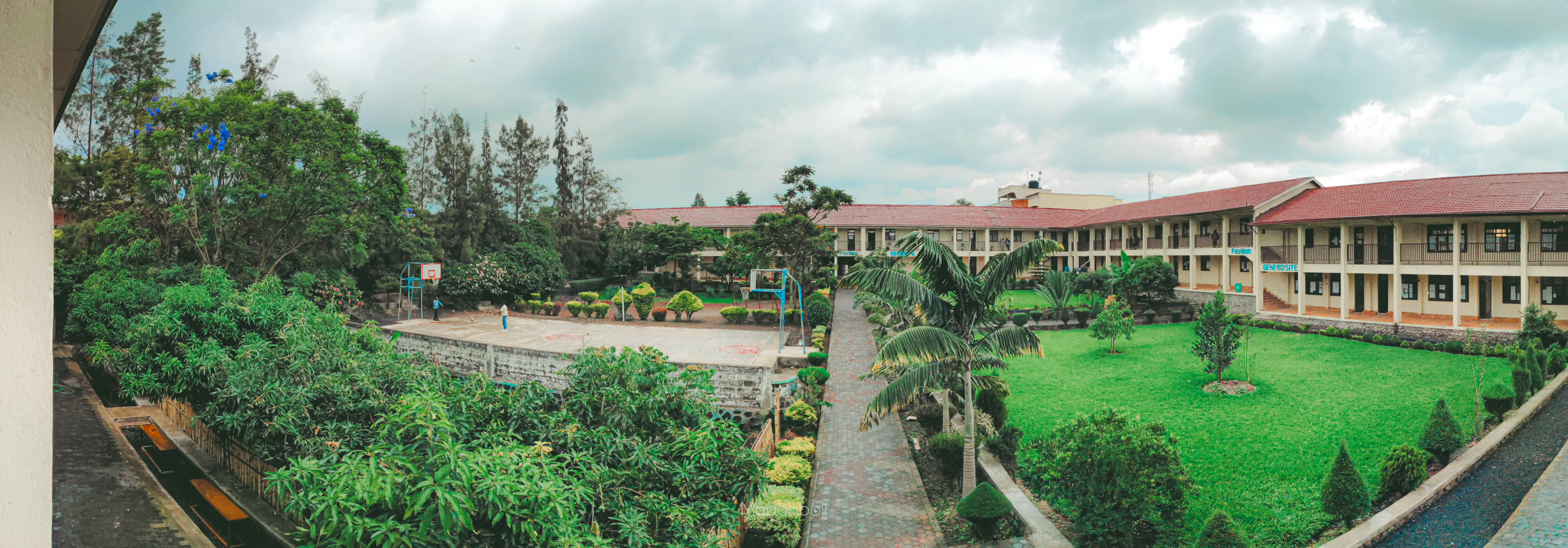
Université Catholique la Sapientia de Goma

Each religious network has its own administrative structure, often modeled on the State system but adapted to the organization of each Church. For example, the Protestant Church manages its schools through the National Coordination Office (Bureau de Coordination National), which oversees overall management and liaises with the State. Provincial offices supervise all Protestant schools in a given province, while local coordination offices manage schools within the denomination. The World Bank reported in 2005 that the Protestant Church runs 66 coordination offices nationwide. A congregation can establish a provincial office if it oversees at least 40 schools in a province, and may appoint a resident adviser for provinces with at least 15 schools. These offices handle personnel matters (recruitment, transfers, promotions), financial management, and pedagogical issues. As a result, a single territorial unit may have six to ten levels of education administration, all nominally under the authority of MEPSP. Provincial and local coordinators are proposed by the Churches, appointed by the Ministry, and funded through student contributions, with a portion allocated to administrative offices according to ministerial standards. At the top, national coordinators of each religious network communicate directly with the Ministry.

==== Parental involvement ====
Parents are the fourth major actor in the administration. They are represented, from the local to the national level, by parent committees in schools, communal and provincial committees, and several national parent organizations, the oldest and most important of which is the National Association of Parents of Pupils and Students of Congo (Association nationale des parents d'élèves et étudiants du Congo; ANAPECO), which advocates for schooling and supports administrative activities. At the school level, parent committees collaborate with management councils to determine the use of "motivation fees", parental contributions primarily used for teacher salaries. Parents also increasingly fund school construction. A portion of these parental fees is set aside for the national organization; however, declining household incomes and reduced school revenues have made these payments to higher-level parent associations less consistent.

==== School level ====
Schools are managed by a head of institution (principal for primary schools, prefect of studies for secondary schools) and a management council. The head of the institution oversees pedagogy, administration, finances, staff management, and all school income and expenses. The management council, composed of the head of the institution, the director of studies, the educational advisor, the discipline director, the teacher representative, and the parent representative, decides on the allocation of funds from operating fees and motivation fees. In subsidized schools, these decisions are made in consultation with religious coordinators, while in non-subsidized schools, administrative officials play this role. Teachers and religious coordinations exercise substantial control over locally generated resources, whereas parental involvement remains marginal, despite their financial contributions.

==== Funding and resource allocation ====
The education system relies heavily on two contributors: parents and the central government. Parents finance the bulk of teacher salaries and school construction, while the government, despite limited resources, controls teacher deployment and examination administration. Contributions from Decentralized Administrative Entities (Entités Administratives Décentralisées; EADs) and churches are modest. Legal ambiguity exists over the ownership of subsidized schools, particularly those built by churches or returned to them after nationalization. The uncertainty surrounding property ownership affects responsibility for investments in infrastructure, although in practice, communities often contribute to construction.

=== Administration of higher education ===
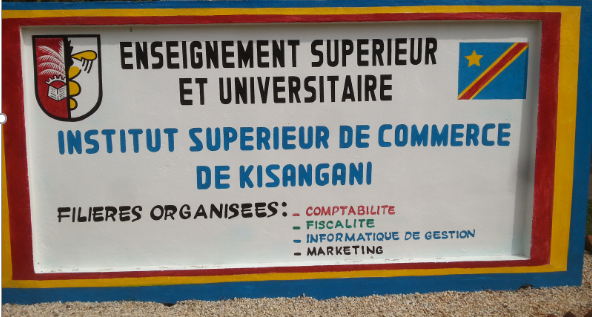
A signboard of the Institut Supérieur de Commerce de Kisangani (ISC–Kisangani), operating under the Enseignement Supérieur et Universitaire (ESU).

Higher education in the country is centrally managed by the Ministry of Higher and University Education (Ministère de l'Enseignement Supérieur et Universitaire, MESU), which oversees the administration, regulation, and supervision of public universities, higher pedagogical institutes (instituts supérieurs pédagogiques), and higher technical institutes (instituts supérieurs techniques). Governance at the national level is structured around three boards of directors, each representing one category of institution: universities, pedagogical institutes, or technical institutes, and tasked with developing institutional policy, setting academic priorities, approving new study programs, and determining curricular frameworks and schedules, with members representing institutions, government, and private-sector employers, all appointed by the central government. Within each institution, administrative authority is exercised through a Council (University or Institute Council), a Management Committee, faculties, and departments, with the Council, Management Committee, Rector, and Directors of Institutes appointed by the central government. The Council serves as the top decision-making body, coordinating academic policies in accordance with board directives and comprising the Rector (for universities) or Director General (for institutes), deans, department heads, and representatives from faculty, administrative staff, and students. In practice, institutional independence is constrained, as boards meet infrequently to approve program modifications, which must then be reviewed by the Ministry's Permanent Commission for Studies (Commission Permanente des Études) and formally enacted through a ministerial decree. While universities can implement unofficial programs independently, official degree-granting programs are subject to complex bureaucratic procedures that do not necessarily guarantee quality.

=== Public and private schools ===
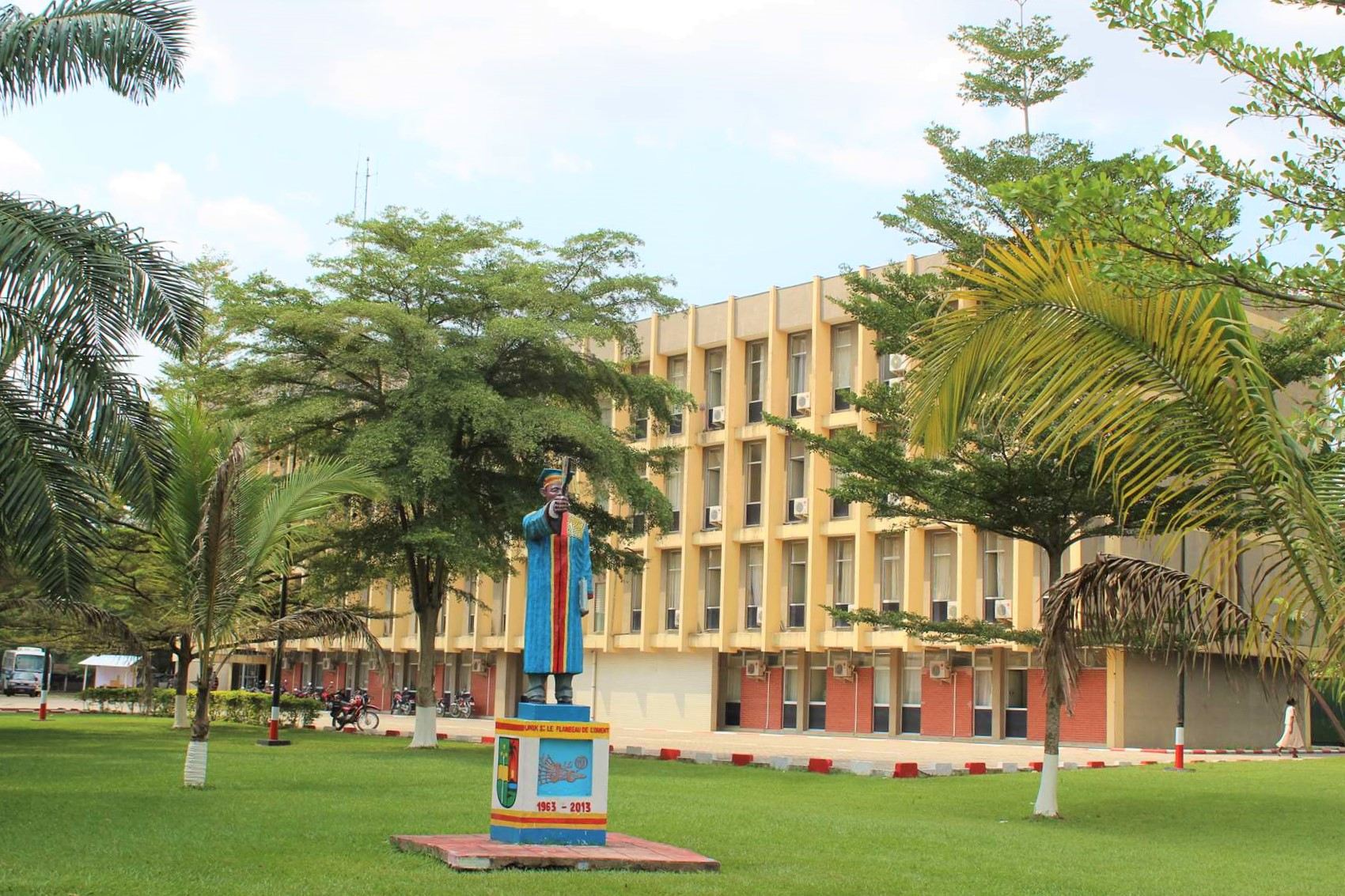
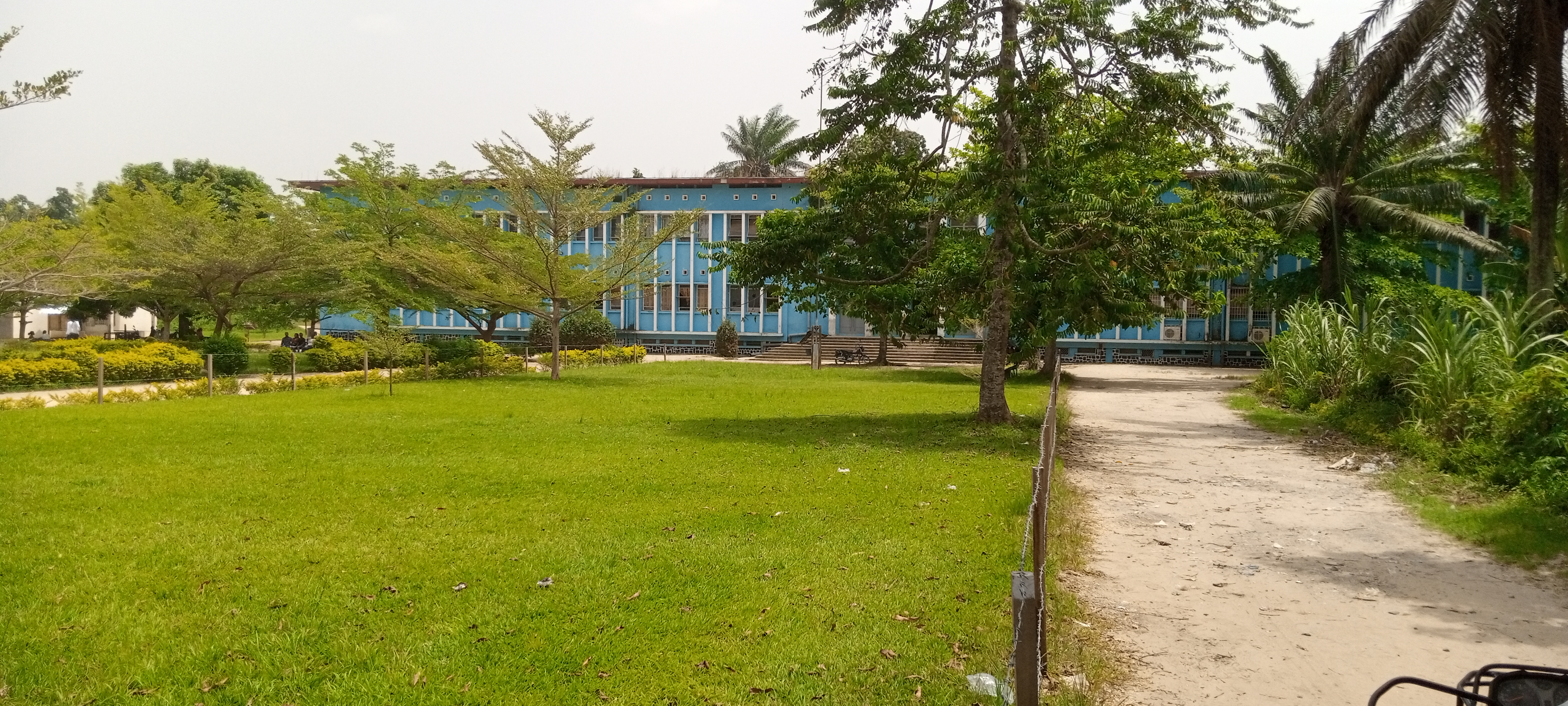
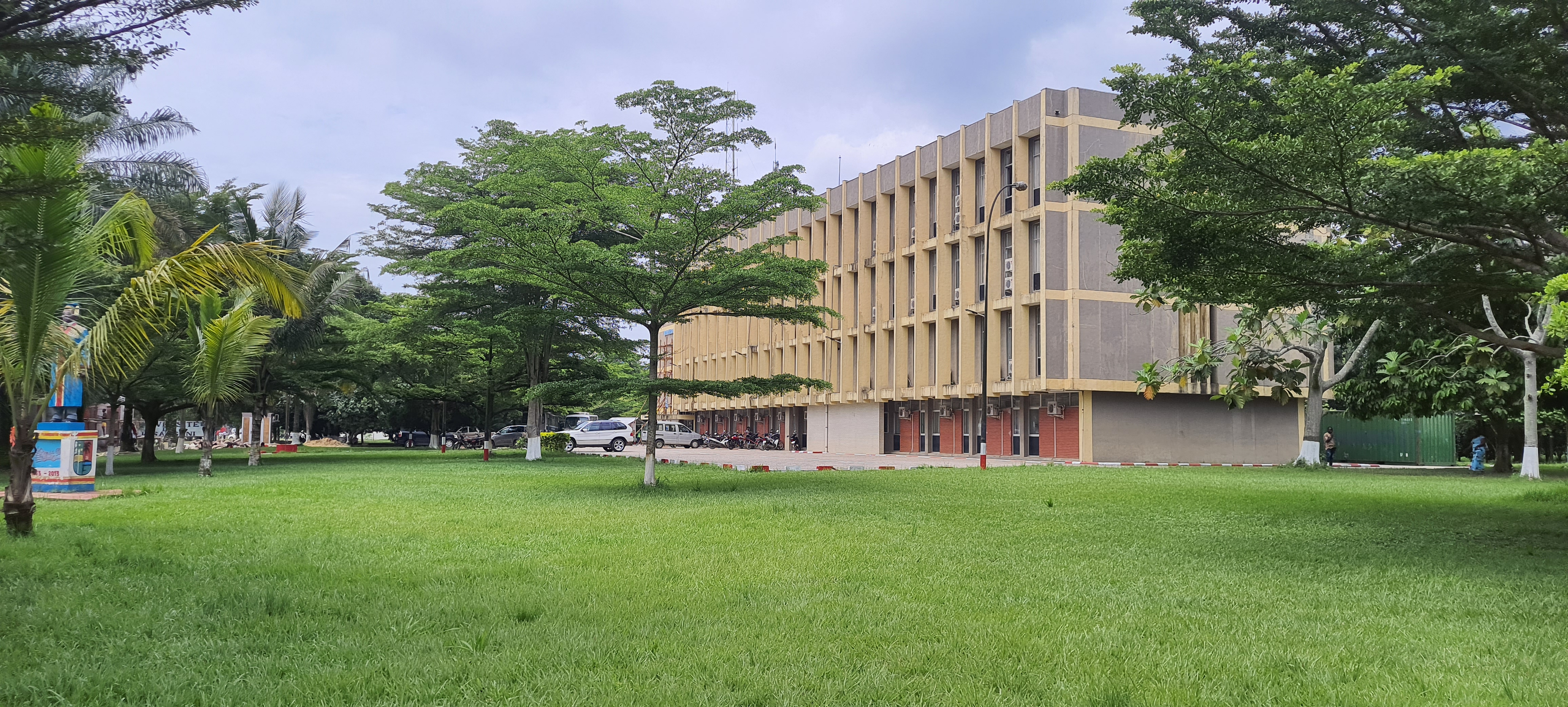
University of Kisangani

The public system is subdivided into non-contracted public schools and contracted public schools. Non-contracted public schools are managed either directly or indirectly by public authorities, or by private entities that have a mandate according to the terms established by a school agreement, an agreement through which the State entrusts the management of a public school or schools to a partner, whether an individual or an organization, based on negotiated and jointly signed provisions. Management of public institutions is considered direct when public authorities ensure their operation using their own human, material, and financial resources. It is considered indirect when public authorities enter into a management agreement with a private entity, individual, or organization, as part of an educational partnership adopted as a strategic management approach. Meanwhile, contracted schools are managed by communities or religious denominations. Among these, Protestants lead with 28.7%, followed by Catholics at 25.8%, non-contracted public schools at 21.3%, private schools at 16.5%, and Kimbanguists at 4.4%. Other contracted public systems (Salvationists, Islamic, fraternities) range between 0.3% and 1%. Catholic, Protestant, and non-contracted public schools collectively account for approximately 80% of primary schools and 75% of secondary schools, while private schools constitute about 12% of all schools, although they represent 65% of preschools.

School type (English)	School type (official French classification)
Unsubsidised schools	Écoles non conventionnées
Catholic schools	Écoles Conventionnées Catholiques
Protestant schools	Écoles Conventionnées Protestantes
Kimbanguist schools	Écoles Conventionnées Kimbanguistes
Islamic schools	Écoles Conventionnées Islamiques
Salutist schools	Écoles Conventionnées Salutistes
Brotherhood schools	Écoles Conventionnées de la Fraternité
Others	—

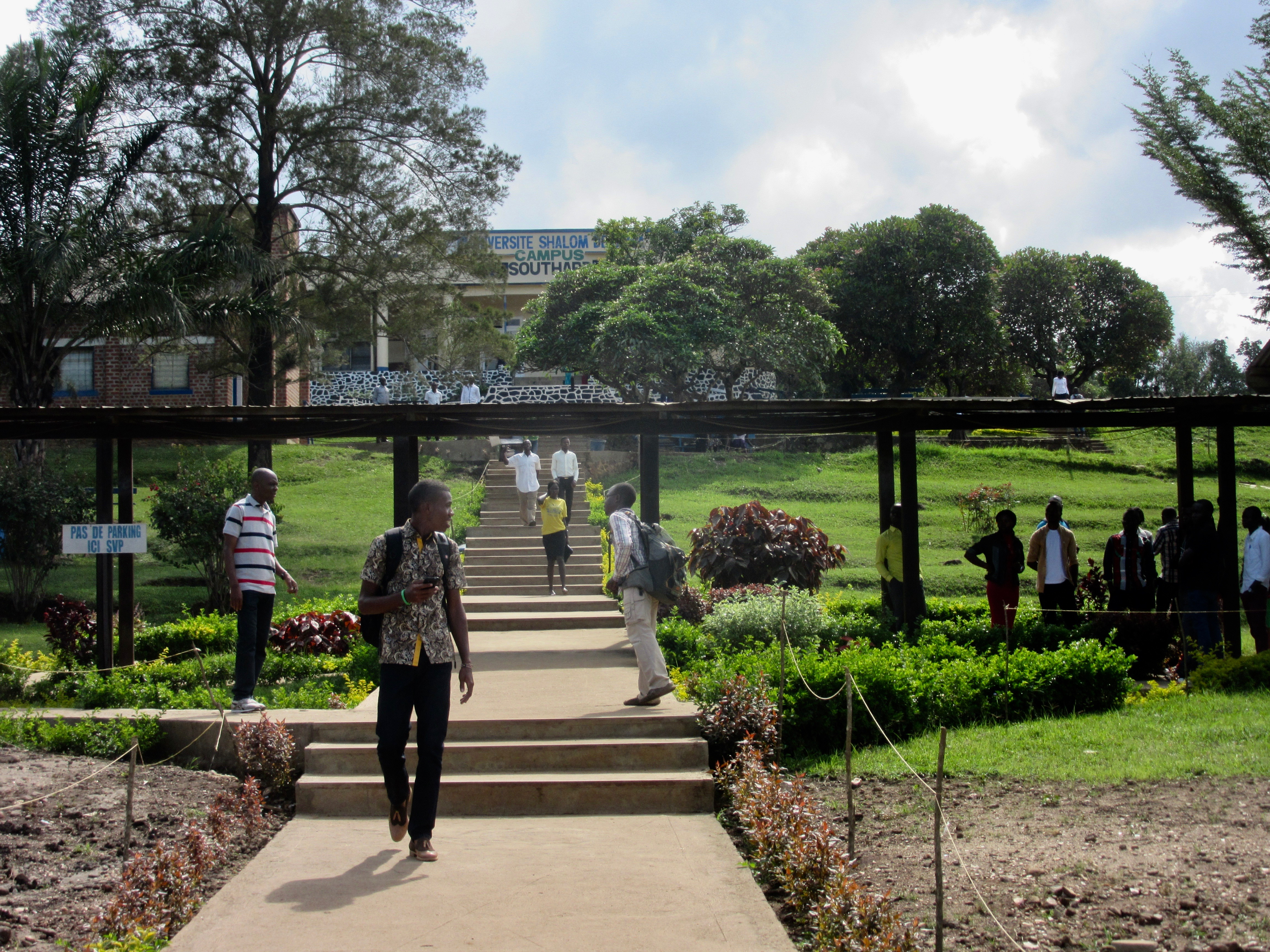
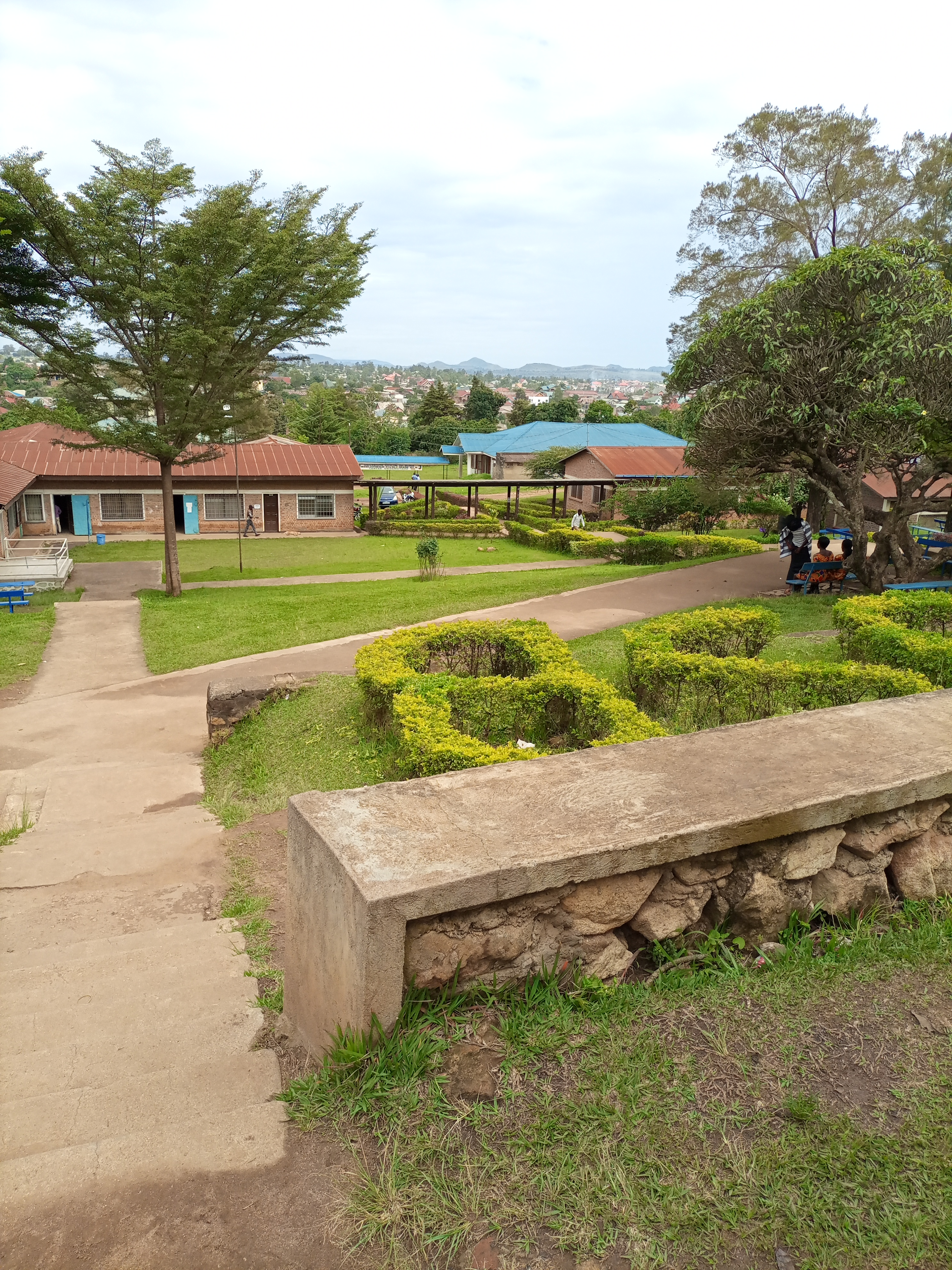
University Shalom of Bunia

Until 2019, public primary education was not universally free. Fees, initially introduced in the 1980s to cover teacher salaries and school operating costs, became a formalized source of household financing in the 1990s, which allowed the system to continue functioning despite recurrent teacher strikes and state collapse. In 2014, per-student expenditure was estimated at USD 50, roughly one-fourth of the average expenditure across Sub-Saharan Africa. Quality deficits were evident in teacher shortages, inadequate infrastructure, limited access to textbooks, and low teacher qualifications. In September 2019, the government introduced a flagship policy offering free primary education, which represents an annual investment of over US$1 billion in human capital. The World Bank supported this initiative through its largest-ever primary education operation in the country, a four-year, US$800 million results-based financing program aimed at education governance reforms, systems strengthening, and long-term sustainability.

Approved private schools (écoles rivées agréées) are founded by individuals or organizations and operate under official state regulations that govern accreditation, academic programs, supervision, and teaching assessments. These schools do not receive subsidies from the State, meaning that parents cover all expenses. A large number of them are part of National Association of Approved Private Schools (Association Nationale des Écoles Privées Agréées; ASSONEPA), while others are affiliated with the Collective of Approved Private Schools of Congo (Collectif des Écoles Privées Agréées du Congo; CEPACO). The private education system has undergone considerable expansion over time. During the 2001–2002 school year, there were 2,195 primary and 1,205 secondary private schools, compared to only 378 and 109, respectively, in the 1986–1987 school year.

== Examinations ==
An exam is held annually to certify the completion of primary education. The exam consists of three subjects: French, mathematics, and general knowledge, and is called the National Test for the End of Primary Education (Test national de fin d'études primaires; TENAFEP), and is developed and administered at the provincial level, which means its results are only comparable within individual provinces, not across time periods, although there are guidelines to maintain content consistency. For instance, in Kinshasa in 2002, the exam included only 25 questions across the three subjects, with a minimal focus on reading comprehension and geometry, and just one question on vocabulary. Most of the questions focus on factual knowledge rather than assessing skills or the ability to apply knowledge. Additionally, the exam primarily consists of multiple-choice questions, where students can guess and score 25 percent by chance. There is no centralized database for TENAFEP results; only unreliable provincial summaries exist, which are calculated manually and cannot be used for cross-provincial or longitudinal comparisons.

The State Exam (Examen d'État), commonly referred to as the EXETAT, is an examination session typically held over four days for students in the 4th year of secondary humanities (formerly the 6th year) across all sections at the end of the school year.

== Data sources ==
Education data are compiled through an established statistical collection system. The primary official source of data on the school system is the Statistical Yearbook (Annuaire statistique), a publication that presents figures by province and by year of study for various indicators. Throughout the 1990s, information was still gathered and processed manually, but publication ceased. Between 1998, during the Second Congo War, and the most recent academic year, data were collected only in regions under government control. Consequently, enrollment statistics from 1990 to 2000 are largely estimative and prone to wide errors. From 2000–2001 onward, data from provinces at least partly under government control became fairly dependable, though missing reports from some schools, often due to transport issues, required data corrections. After the 2001–02 peace accord, the nationwide collection of education statistics was reinstated.

A second annual data source for the education system is SECOPE, which operates a computerized database covering teachers, schools, and students. SECOPE's figures generally align with those in the Statistical Yearbook. The third source is a UNICEF household survey that provides insights into primary school enrollment for the years 1999–2000 and 2000–2001. The fourth source, derived from RESEN (Rapport d'état du système éducatif national) studies, includes surveys conducted among public and private schools, as well as parents.

== Enrollment and attendance ==
School enrollment and attendance remain significant challenges, as over 5.2 million children were left without schooling due to the six-year First and Second Congo Wars. Despite this, student numbers have increased across all educational levels, with higher education experiencing the most substantial expansion. From 1986–87 to 2001–02, university enrollment rose 3.7 times (a 270% increase), and the number of higher education institutions grew ninefold, reaching about 358 students per 100,000 people. In secondary education, the number of schools increased by 90% and enrollment by 75%, while primary schools grew by 65%, with student numbers rising by 31%.

Level/indicator	Gross enrollment ratio (GER)	Completion rate	Dropout/repetition	Transition rate	Notes/inequalities
Primary (2001–02)	64% overall 56% girls 72% boys	29%	50% of students drop out before 6th year Only 20% reach 6th year without repeating	85% to secondary	GER varies by province (46–80%). Poor households' GER 2/3 of richest 20%. Very low among forest dwellers, Pygmies, riverine children, street children, orphans, child soldiers, refugees
Secondary (2001–02)	__	__	50% repeat a grade	Transition to higher education: 65% (up from 50% before 1990)	Mainly wealthiest children reach secondary completion
Higher education (2001–02)	__	18% obtain degree without repeating	50% dropout in 1st year, 35% in 2nd year	Transition from first to second cycle very high	Internal efficiency 50%

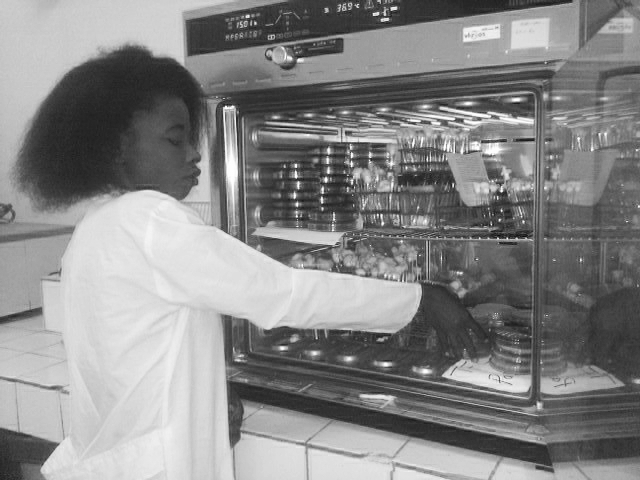
A University of Kisangani student placing test tubes in an incubator for her research.

The gross enrollment rate in primary education climbed from below 90% in 2007 to over 107% by 2014, mainly due to the gradual rollout of free education beginning in 2010. This policy significantly improved access, especially for children from low-income families who previously could not attend school. By 2014, the national primary completion rate stood at 70%. However, about 44% of first-grade students were above the official entry age of six, and 11% were repeaters. Since 2006, more than 80% of students have passed the national primary school leaving exam. According to the 2014 RESEN assessment, only half of the tested students passed the reading comprehension test, and just 36% succeeded in writing. Meanwhile, at the secondary level, first-year enrollment has stayed steady at around 48% since 2006. The proportion of students in private schools more than doubled during the 2010s, climbing from 11.2% to 24.2% in 2012, as many shifted to public schools after the introduction of free education. The share of out-of-school children at the lower secondary level is lower than at the primary level. Enrollment in upper secondary education increased by 47% between 2006 and 2012, with general and teacher training programs growing by 55% and 52%, respectively, while vocational and arts programs saw declines of less than 8% and 24%. The overall gross secondary enrollment rate was 38.3% in the 2012–2013 academic year. Boys were more likely to be enrolled (47.2%) than girls (29.3%). Enrollment rates also varied regionally, with Kinshasa at the highest rate (59%) and the Orientale Province at the lowest rate (24.6%). In 2013, 14% of secondary students graduated with less than 60%, 25% scored between 55% and 59%, and 61% scored below 55%.

Higher education expanded rapidly in the 2010s in terms of institutions and student population. Enrollment more than doubled between 2006 and 2012, from 239,914 to 512,322, and was unevenly distributed across provinces: Kinshasa hosted 33.5% of students, Katanga 22.8%, and Maniema just 1.5%. Over one-third of students were in entry-level classes, and only 17% were in their final year, with high dropout and repetition rates, particularly in the initial stages. Non-formal education has also grown since 2010. The illiteracy rate remains high at 27.1%, with women (39%) far more affected than men (14%). Rural areas report an illiteracy rate of 38% compared to 11% in urban areas. Literacy levels vary by location: in Kinshasa, 91% of women and 97% of men were literate, while in Équateur, only 51% of women could read and write, and in North Kivu, male literacy stands at 80%.

== Lists ==
=== Schools ===
- American School of Kinshasa
- Institut de N'Djili

=== Research centers and institutes ===
- Centre régional d'études nucléaires de Kinshasa (CREN-K)
- Centre d'études égyptologiques Cheik Anta Diop de l'INADEP -formation et recherche
- Centre d'Études des Religions Africaines (CERA)
- Institut Congolais pour la Conservation de la Nature, ICCN
- Institut Africain d'Études Prospectives - INADEP
