= Communes of the Democratic Republic of the Congo =

The communes of the Democratic Republic of the Congo are administrative divisions of both cities and territories. They are led by government appointed burgomasters (fr. bourgmestres) and are further divided into quarters (fr. quartiers) and embedded groupings (fr. groupements incorporé).

== List of city and territory communes ==
=== City communes ===
The 34 cities of DR Congo are divided into 139 communes:

Commune	City	Province
Babade	Buta	Bas-Uélé
Dobea	Buta	Bas-Uélé
Finant	Buta	Bas-Uélé
Tepatondele	Buta	Bas-Uélé
Mbandaka	Mbandaka	Équateur
Wangata	Mbandaka	Équateur
Kikula	Likasi	Haut-Katanga
Likasi	Likasi	Haut-Katanga
Panda	Likasi	Haut-Katanga
Shituru	Likasi	Haut-Katanga
Annexe	Lubumbashi	Haut-Katanga
Kamalondo	Lubumbashi	Haut-Katanga
Kampemba	Lubumbashi	Haut-Katanga
Katuba	Lubumbashi	Haut-Katanga
Kenya	Lubumbashi	Haut-Katanga
Lubumbashi	Lubumbashi	Haut-Katanga
Ruashi	Lubumbashi	Haut-Katanga
Dimayi	Kamina	Haut-Lomami
Kamina	Kamina	Haut-Lomami
Sobongo	Kamina	Haut-Lomami
Kupa	Isiro	Haut-Uélé
Mambaya	Isiro	Haut-Uélé
Mendambo	Isiro	Haut-Uélé
Mbunya	Bunia	Ituri
Nyakasanza	Bunia	Ituri
Shari	Bunia	Ituri
Dibumba I	Tshikapa	Kasaï
Dibumba II	Tshikapa	Kasaï
Kanzala	Tshikapa	Kasaï
Mabondo	Tshikapa	Kasaï
Mbumba	Tshikapa	Kasaï
Kananga	Kananga	Kasaï-Central
Katoka	Kananga	Kasaï-Central
Lukonga	Kananga	Kasaï-Central
Ndesha	Kananga	Kasaï-Central
Nganza	Kananga	Kasaï-Central
Bipemba	Mbuji-Mayi	Kasaï-Oriental
Dibindi	Mbuji-Mayi	Kasaï-Oriental
Diulu	Mbuji-Mayi	Kasaï-Oriental
Kanshi	Mbuji-Mayi	Kasaï-Oriental
Muya	Mbuji-Mayi	Kasaï-Oriental
Bandalungwa	Kinshasa	
Barumbu	Kinshasa	
Bumbu	Kinshasa	
Gombe	Kinshasa	
Kalamu	Kinshasa	
Kasa-Vubu	Kinshasa	
Kimbanseke	Kinshasa	
Kinshasa	Kinshasa	
Kintambo	Kinshasa	
Kisenso	Kinshasa	
Lemba	Kinshasa	
Limete	Kinshasa	
Lingwala	Kinshasa	
Makala	Kinshasa	
Maluku	Kinshasa	
Masina	Kinshasa	
Matete	Kinshasa	
Mont Ngafula	Kinshasa	
Ndjili	Kinshasa	
Ngaba	Kinshasa	
Ngaliema	Kinshasa	
Ngiri-Ngiri	Kinshasa	
Nsele	Kinshasa	
Selembao	Kinshasa	
Kabondo	Boma	Kongo Central
Kalamu	Boma	Kongo Central
Nzadi	Boma	Kongo Central
Matadi	Matadi	Kongo Central
Mvuzi	Matadi	Kongo Central
Nzanza	Matadi	Kongo Central
Cinq Mai	Kenge	Kwango
Laurent Desire Kabila	Kenge	Kwango
Manonga	Kenge	Kwango
Masikita	Kenge	Kwango
Mavula	Kenge	Kwango
Basoko	Bandundu	Kwilu
Disasi	Bandundu	Kwilu
Mayoyo	Bandundu	Kwilu
Kazamba	Kikwit	Kwilu
Lukemi	Kikwit	Kwilu
Lukolela	Kikwit	Kwilu
Nzinda	Kikwit	Kwilu
Kabondo	Kabinda	Lomami
Kabuelabuela	Kabinda	Lomami
Kajiba	Kabinda	Lomami
Mudingayi	Kabinda	Lomami
Bondoyi	Mwene-Ditu	Lomami
Musadi	Mwene-Ditu	Lomami
Mwene-Ditu	Mwene-Ditu	Lomami
Dilala	Kolwezi	Lualaba
Manika	Kolwezi	Lualaba
Bonse	Inongo	Mai-Ndombe
Mpolo	Inongo	Mai-Ndombe
Mpongonzoli	Inongo	Mai-Ndombe
Alunguli	Kindu	Maniema
Kasuku	Kindu	Maniema
Mikelenge	Kindu	Maniema
Bolikango	Lisala	Mongala
Mongala	Lisala	Mongala
Gbadolite	Gbadolite	Nord-Ubangi
Molegbe	Gbadolite	Nord-Ubangi
Nganza	Gbadolite	Nord-Ubangi
Beu	Beni	North Kivu
Bungulu	Beni	North Kivu
Mulekera	Beni	North Kivu
Ruwenzori	Beni	North Kivu
Bulengera	Butembo	North Kivu
Kimemi	Butembo	North Kivu
Mususa	Butembo	North Kivu
Vulamba	Butembo	North Kivu
Goma	Goma	North Kivu
Karisimbi	Goma	North Kivu
Ewango	Lumumbaville	Sankuru
Wembo-Nyama	Lumumbaville	Sankuru
Kabondo	Lusambo	Sankuru
Lupembe	Lusambo	Sankuru
Lusambo	Lusambo	Sankuru
Tusuanganyi	Lusambo	Sankuru
Bagira	Bukavu	South Kivu
Ibanda	Bukavu	South Kivu
Kadutu	Bukavu	South Kivu
Gbazubu	Gemena	Sud-Ubangi
Labo	Gemena	Sud-Ubangi
Lac-Ntumba	Gemena	Sud-Ubangi
Mont Gila	Gemena	Sud-Ubangi
Nzulu	Zongo	Sud-Ubangi
Wango	Zongo	Sud-Ubangi
Kalemie	Kalemie	Tanganyika
Lac	Kalemie	Tanganyika
Lukuga	Kalemie	Tanganyika
Kabondo	Kisangani	Tshopo
Kisangani	Kisangani	Tshopo
Lubunga	Kisangani	Tshopo
Makiso	Kisangani	Tshopo
Mangobo	Kisangani	Tshopo
Tshopo	Kisangani	Tshopo
Boende	Boende	Tshuapa
Tshuapa	Boende	Tshuapa

=== Territory communes ===
There are 174 communes in the 145 territories of DR Congo. Each administrative center of a territory is a commune and in most cases has the same name as the territory.
