= Kenya, Lubumbashi =

Kenya
- Commune
- Location within Democratic Republic of the Congo
- Coordinates: 11°40′S 27°28′E
- Country: Democratic Republic of the Congo
- Province: Haut-Katanga
- City: Lubumbashi
- Founded: 1929

Government
  - Bourgmestre (Mayor): leader_name = Kazadi Mumba (since 2023)
- Time zone: UTC+2 (CAT)

Kenya is a commune of the city of Lubumbashi in the Democratic Republic of the Congo (Haut-Katanga Province). Located south of the city center, it is among the earliest municipalities established in Lubumbashi and most densely populated municipalities in the city.

The commune is historically significant as a former cité indigène (indigenous quarter) created during the colonial era. It is home to the Stade Frédéric-Kibasa-Maliba (formerly Stade de la Kenya), the third-largest stadium in the country.

== History ==
The commune of Kenya was established in 1929 by the Belgian colonial administration. It was created as an extension of the Quartier Albert (now the commune of Kamalondo) to accommodate the growing African workforce attracted by the mining activities of the Union Minière du Haut-Katanga (UMHK).

Designed with a grid layout typical of colonial urban planning, it was originally designated as a "Cité Indigène" (native city), strictly separated from the European quarters by a zone neutre (neutral zone).

== Geography and administration ==
The commune is located to the south of Lubumbashi's city center. It is bordered by the communes of Kamalondo, Katuba, and Kampemba.

It is divided into several neighborhoods (quartiers), named after rivers in the region, including:

- Lualaba
- Luapula
- Luvua
- Brondo

=== Governance ===
As of 27 January 2023, the Bourgmestre (Mayor) of the commune is Kazadi Mumba, and the Deputy Bourgmestre is Pashil Nyembo Monga.

== Economy ==
The local economy of Kenya is largely driven by informal commerce, small-scale retail, and market activities centered around the Marché de la Kenya. These activities support a significant portion of the commune’s population and play a key role in Lubumbashi’s urban economy.

== Demographics ==
Kenya is characterized by a high population density. While exact recent census data is variable, it is historically cited as one of the most densely populated areas in Lubumbashi. Some academic studies have estimated population densities reaching up to 42,000 inhabitants per km², largely attributed to plot subdivision and informal housing.

== Landmarks ==
- Stade Frédéric-Kibasa-Maliba: This 35,000-seat stadium is the home ground of FC Saint Éloi Lupopo. The stadium was successively known as Stade Albert, Stade Mobutu, and Stade de la Kenya before being renamed Stade Frédéric-Kibasa-Maliba.
- Basilique Sainte-Marie: A historic red-brick Roman Catholic basilica built in the 1940s, serving as a major religious landmark for the community.
- Marché de la Kenya: One of the principal local markets, known for its informal trade and "micro-commerce," playing a central role in the local economy.
