= Free University of the Great Lakes Countries =

Christian university in the Democratic Republic of the Congo

- Université Libre des Pays des Grands Lacs
- Former name: Institut Supérieur de Théologie Protestante (ISTP)
- Motto: Foi, Science, Action (Latin)
- Motto in English: "Faith, Science, Action"
- Type: Private
- Established: 1985; 41 years ago
- Religious affiliation: CBCA; CEBCE; CELPA; CADAF; EAC; CLMC
- Academic affiliations: Agence universitaire de la Francophonie
- Rector: Joseph Wasso Misona
- Students: Over 3,800 (2025-2026)
- Location: Goma, North Kivu, Democratic Republic of the Congo
- Campus: Urban
- Colors: Red, blue and yellow
- Website: https://ulpgl.net/

The Free University of the Great Lakes Countries (French: Université Libre des Pays des Grands Lacs, colloquially referred to by its acronym ULPGL), is a private Christian educational institution located in Goma, in the North Kivu province of the eastern region of the Democratic Republic of the Congo. ULPGL was founded in 1985, as a result of the Institut Supérieur de Théologie Protestante and was granted university status by the government in 1991. It is sponsored by six Protestant denominations, including two Baptists (CBCA and CEBCE), two Pentecostals (CELPA and CADAF), one Anglican (EAC), and one Methodist (CLMC).

With a vision to provide quality education and research tailored to the needs of the African Great Lakes Region, ULPGL consists of six academic faculties and other educational institutions, such as a nursery and primary school (EMP Kauta) and a secondary school (Metanoïa Institute). The university mainly attracts students from the Great Lakes region, which includes countries such as DRC, Rwanda, Burundi, and occasionally Uganda and Tanzania.

== History ==
The establishment of ULPGL's lineage traces back to the collaborative endeavors of six Protestant ecclesiastical communities, including two Baptist entities (Communauté Baptiste au Centre de l'Afrique; CBCA and Communauté des Églises Baptistes du Congo-Est; CEBCE), two Pentecostal congregations (Communauté des Églises Libres de Pentecôte; CELPA and Communauté Assemblée de Dieu à l'Est du Congo; CADAF), one Anglican denomination (Afrique and Église Anglicane du Congo; EAC), and one Methodist association (CLMC). Initially founded in 1985 as the Institut Supérieur de Théologie Protestante (ISTP), the university underwent a significant transformation on 16 August 1991, when it was officially established as the Université Libre des Pays des Grands Lacs (ULPGL) as ordained by Order N°ESU/CABMIN/0188/91.

This pivotal juncture heralded the university's expansive educational scope, incorporating the Faculty of Protestant Theology and Faculty of Law. The accreditation of ULPGL's academic credentials was solidified by Order N°ESURS/CABMIN/0108/92, dated 5 February 1992, and further augmented by Ministerial Order N°ESURES/CABMIN/A5/0022/96 of 31 January 1996, endorsing the university's establishment. Prime Ministerial Decree No. 0016 of 27 May 1996, granted ULPGL with legal personality, elevating it to the status of a "Public Utility Establishment". The ultimate imprimatur was consecrated by Presidential Decree No. 06/0106 of 12 June 2006.

In its commitment to expanding access to education, ULPGL embarked on the establishment of two campuses in Bukavu (South Kivu) and Butembo (North Kivu) in 2001. These campuses evolved into autonomous universities, namely ULPGL-Bukavu and ULPGL-Butembo, alongside the original ULPGL-Goma, also known as the mother university.

== Campuses ==
The ULPGL has three campuses in the eastern region of the Democratic Republic of the Congo: Goma, Bukavu, and Butembo.

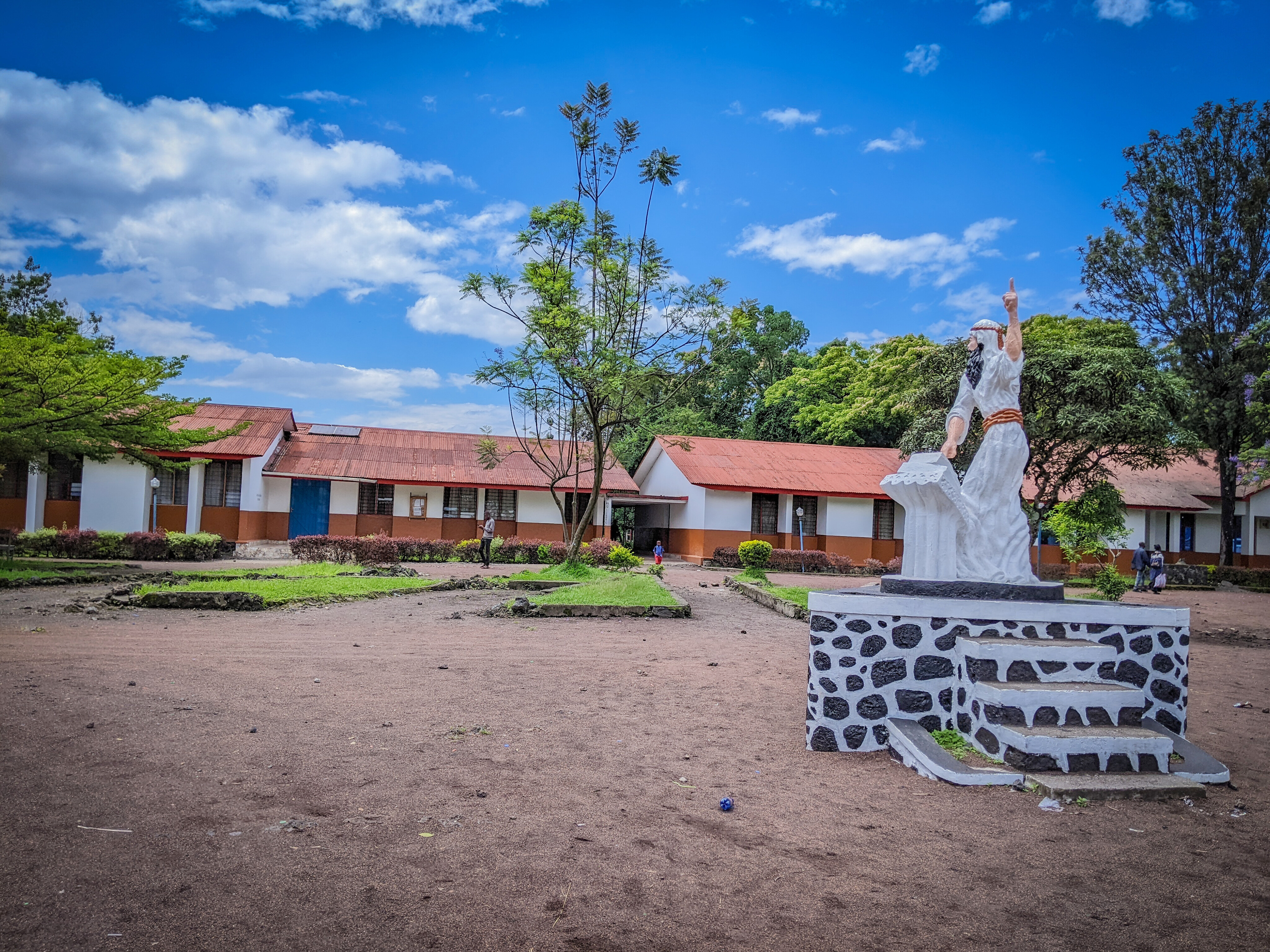
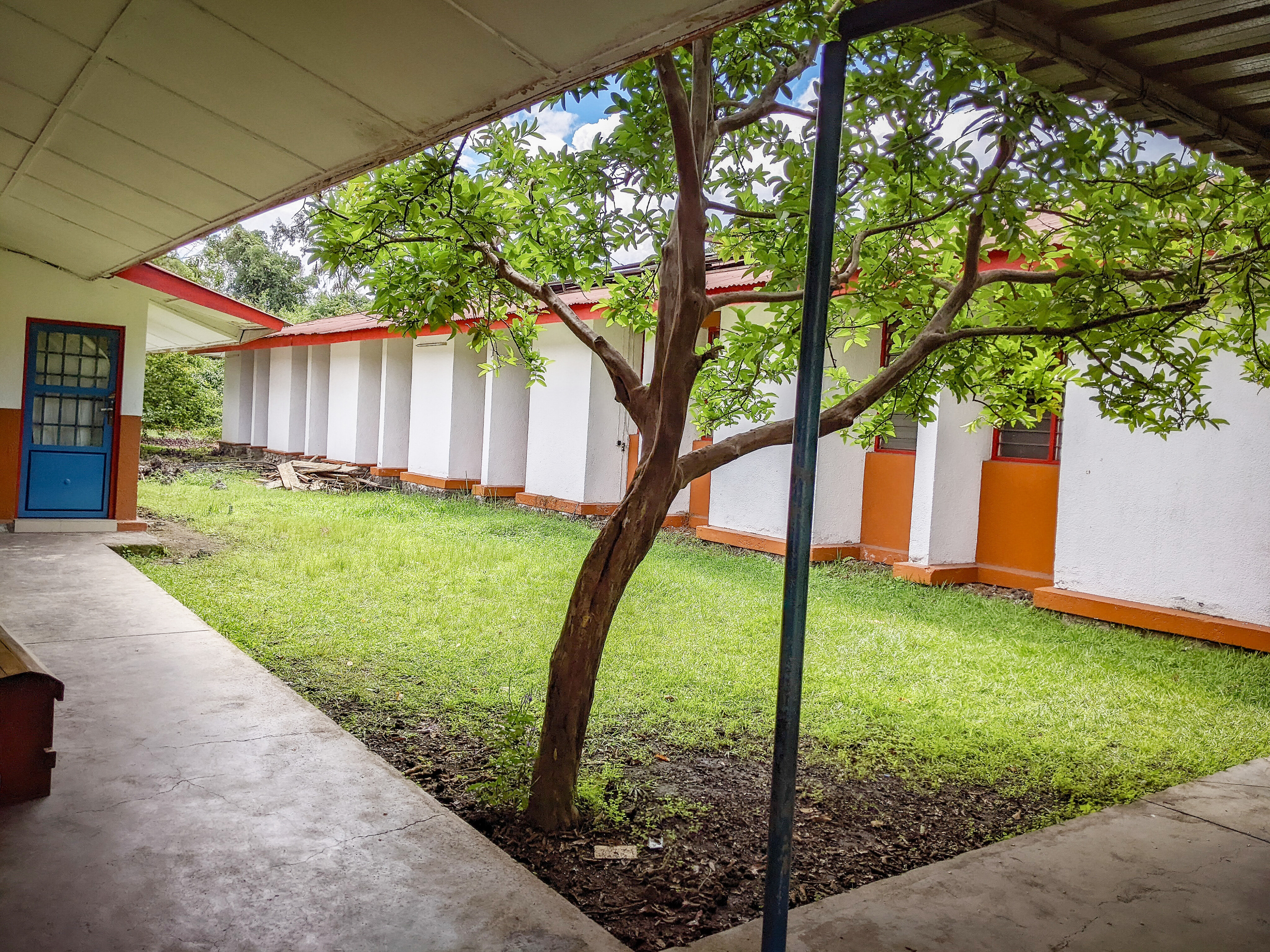
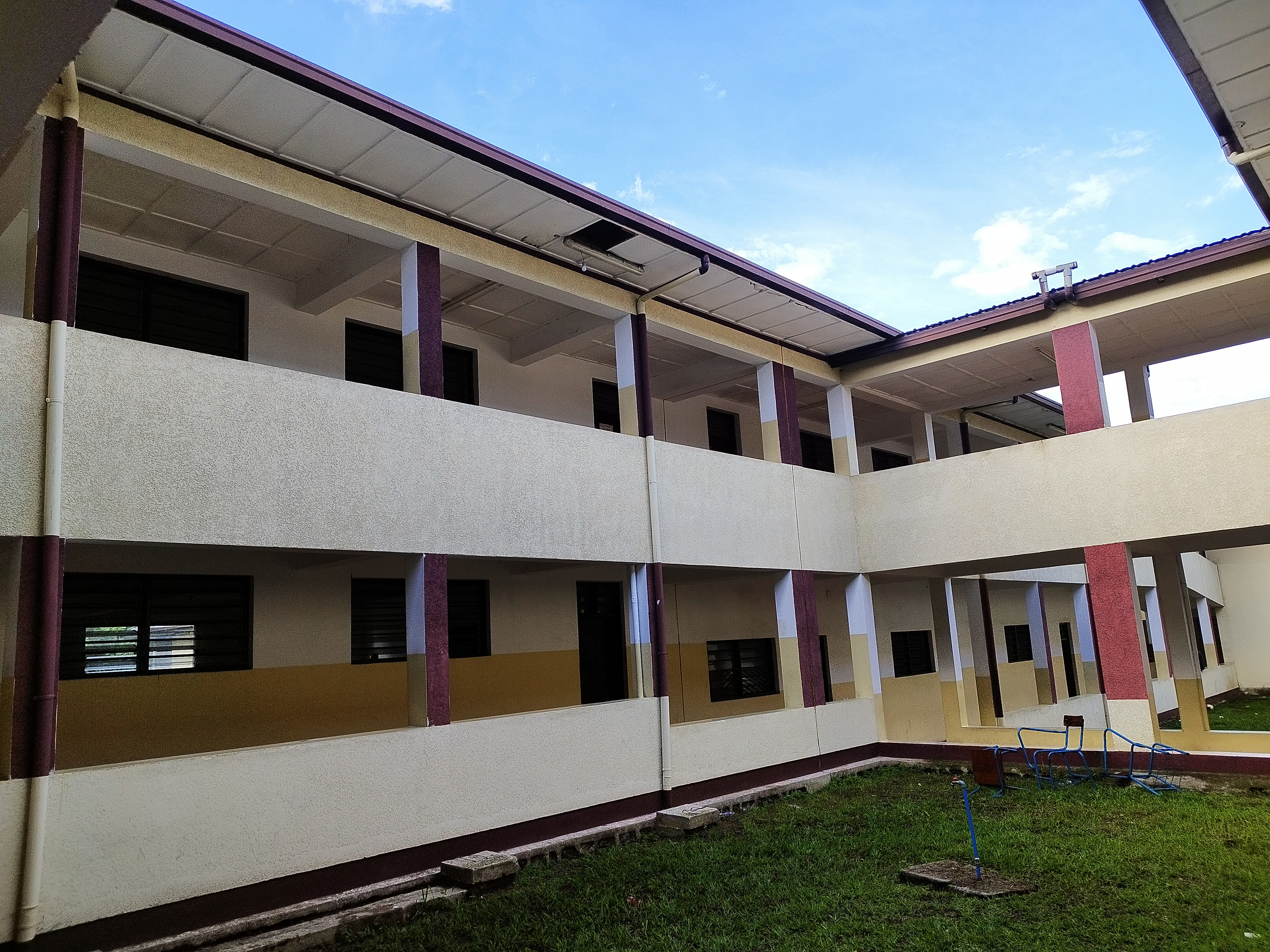
Moïse campus, Goma, North Kivu, November 2023

=== ULPGL-Goma ===
Goma hosts two campuses of ULPGL: Moïse and Salomon. The Moïse Campus, comprising the Faculty of Theology, student residences, and scholarly lodgings for professors, was erected by MEU, while CPFP from Hamburg, facilitated the development of the Salomon Campus, housing faculties such as Law, Economics, Science of Education, and accommodations for male students and visiting professors.

=== ULPGL-Bukavu ===
In Bukavu, ULPGL operates with a variety of faculties including Theology (FT), Economic Sciences and Management (FSEG), Community Health and Development (FSDC), and Psychology and Sciences of Education (FPSE). Despite minimal reception infrastructure, the university has secured land in the commune of Ibanda, in Kasihe, for future expansion.

=== ULPGL-Butembo ===
In Butembo, ULPGL operates four faculties: Theology, Economic and Management Sciences, Community Health and Development, and Psychology and Educational Sciences. Building projects are currently in progress on two sites, one situated in Makoma, Katwa, and the other in Kinyatsi, to expand the university's academic programs and facilities.

== Governance and organization ==
The ULPGL is governed by a combination of its Board of Directors, a university council, a scientific council, and a management committee led by a Rector. The university is organized around six faculties:

=== Theology ===
The Faculty of Theology aims to critically examine contemporary societal values and norms from a Christian perspective. It offers intellectual and moral training while contributing to the spiritual fulfillment of the community. Through services like the Chaplaincy and the Polyvalent Center for Vocational Training (Centre Polyvalent pour la Formation Professionnelle; CPFP), the faculty provides diverse educational avenues.

=== Law ===
With a mission to combat legal underdevelopment and ignorance of the law within the community, the Faculty of Law undertakes research, hosts consultation frameworks, and operates programs like the Legal Clinic for the Protection of Victims of Sexual Violence. These initiatives aim to promote human rights and facilitate legal assistance for vulnerable individuals.

=== Economic Sciences and Management ===
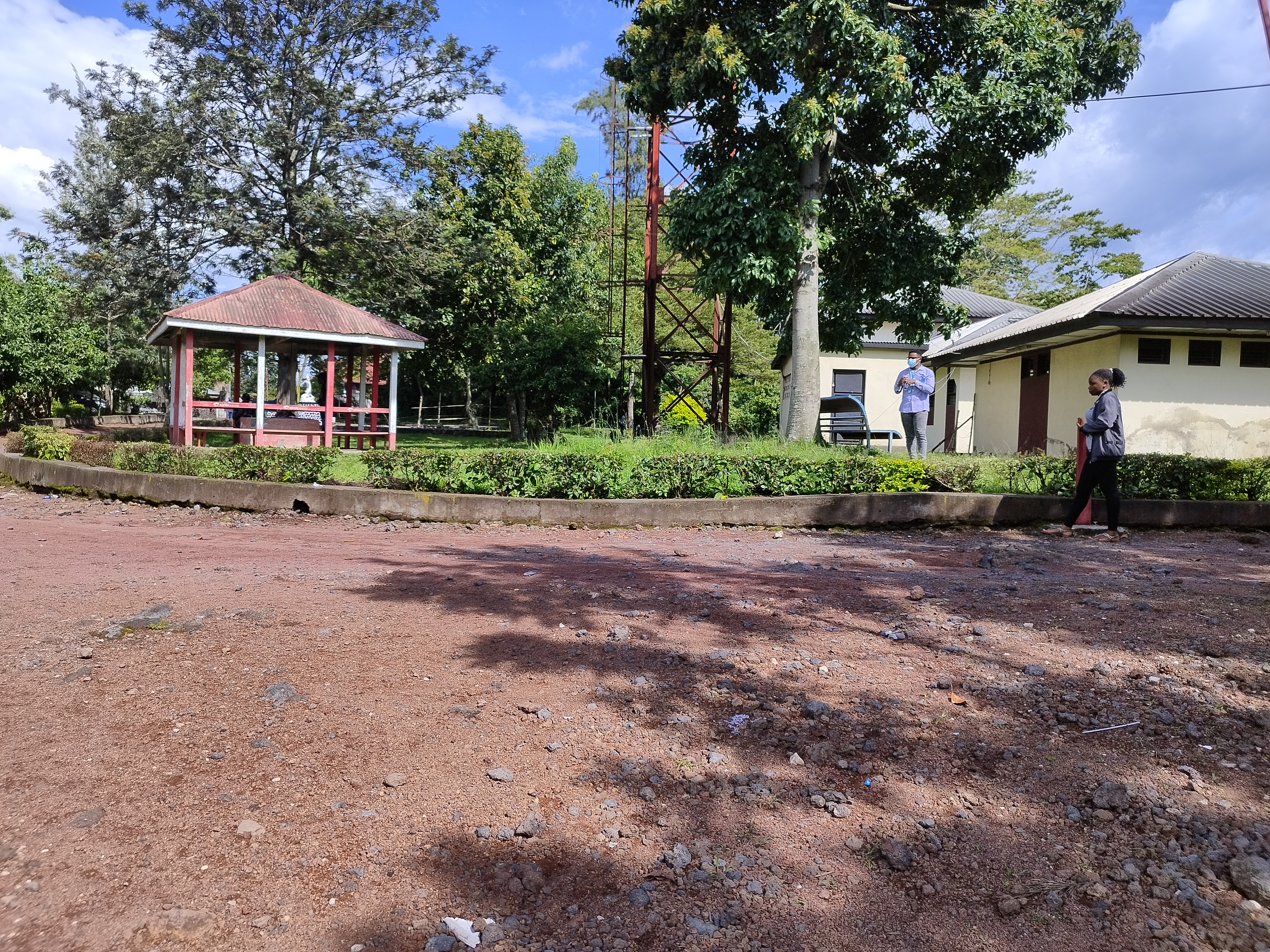
ULPGL seen from the entrance

This faculty supports local development initiatives by providing technical support and training people capable of creating and managing businesses sustainably. Through actions such as supporting cooperatives, microfinance, and offering professional IT training via the Computer and Business Management Center (Centre Informatique et de Management des Entreprises; CIME).

=== Health and Community Development ===
Focused on equipping learners with the knowledge and skills to improve community health and integral development, Faculty of Health and Community Development fosters partnerships with communities and implements projects such as education on malaria prevention and evaluating social reintegration programs.

=== Psychology and Educational Sciences ===
Trains educators and administrators, conducts research for educational improvement, and offers services to enhance learning quality.

=== Science and Applied Technology ===
This faculty provides technical support for local development initiatives and trains individuals to introduce appropriate technologies while considering ecological preservation. It aims to empower people to implement sustainable development practices in their environment.

== Academics ==
=== Educational institutions ===
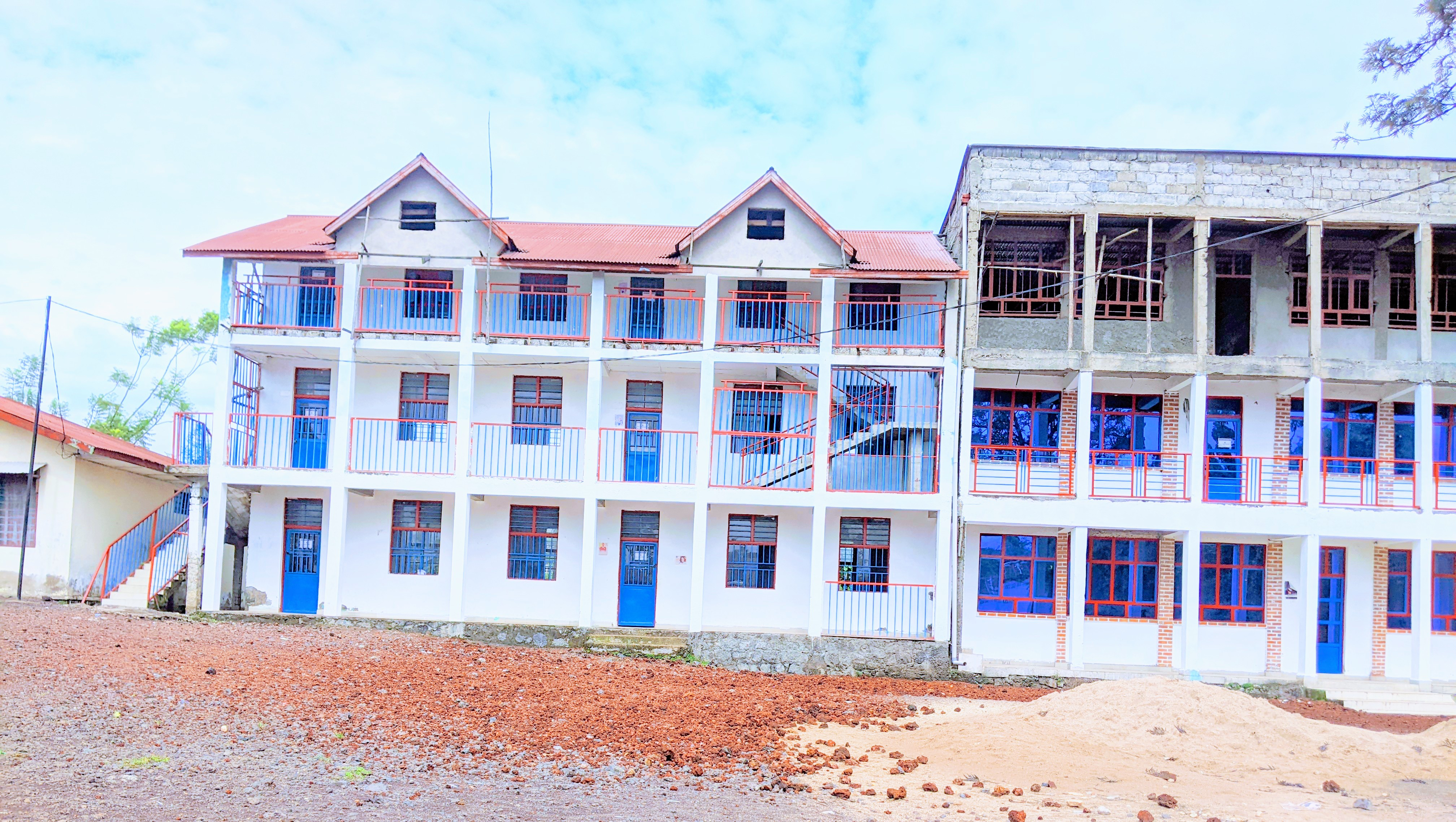
Kauta Primary School, Goma, commune of Goma.

==== EMP Kauta ====
EMP Kauta is a prominent nursery and primary school named after one of the first CBCA pastors in the city. Initially, it only catered to the children of married ISTP students, but its stellar reputation has drawn students from all over the city.

==== Metanoïa Institute ====
Established in 2001, the Metanoïa Institute is a ULPGL-accredited private secondary school situated in the Himbi neighborhood within the commune of Goma. Founded at the initiative of Prof. Samuel Ngayohembako, then ULPGL's rector, the institution was conceived as a preparatory school for university education and as a model facility for the Faculty of Education. At its inception, the school operated with four classes, comprising three first-year sections enrolling 88 students and one second-year section with 37 students. Over time, the institution expanded progressively, adding new classes each academic year. By 2024, it had grown to encompass 25 classes, distributed across five academic sections: Commerce and Management, Literary Studies, Pedagogy, Science, and Construction. It offers four academic tracks: Commercial and Administrative, Chemistry–Biology, Latin–Philosophy, and General Pedagogy.

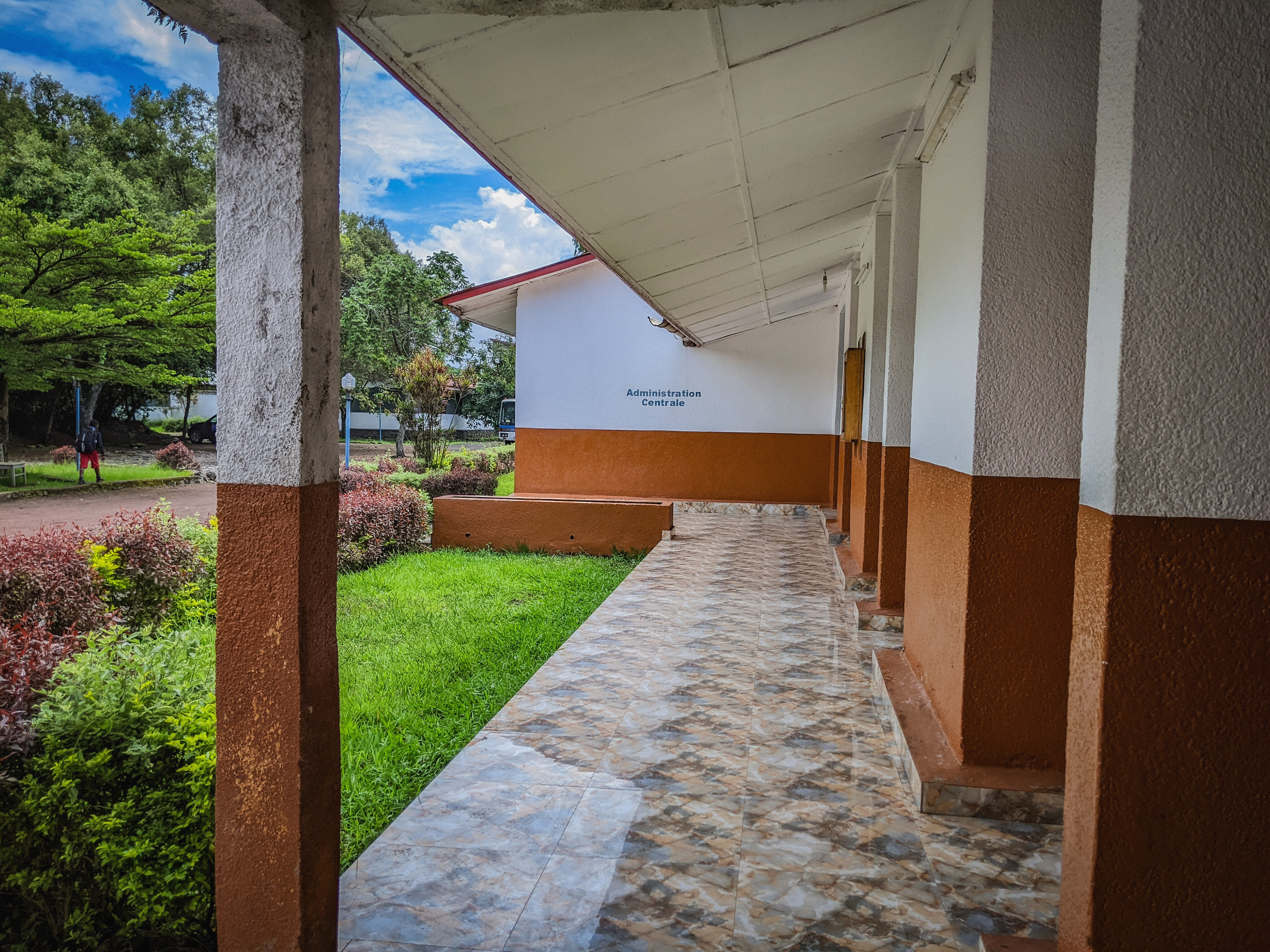
Side view of Central Administration (Administration Centrale) building on Moïse Campus.

=== Research centers ===
- Polyvalent Center for Vocational Training (Centre Polyvalent pour la Formation Professionnelle; CPFP)
- The Center for Computer Science and Business Management (Centre Informatique et de Management des Entreprises; CIME)
- The African Center for Research and Education for Peace and Democracy (Centre Africain de Recherche et d'Education à la Paix et à la Démocratie; CAREPD)
- Legal Clinic
- University Hospital Center (University Dispensary)

=== Library ===
The ULPGL has a library with approximately 10,000 books and five scientific journals, including The Bulletin of Theological and Sociological Research (Le Bulletin de Recherches Théologiques et Sociologiques; BRTS), L'Analyste Topique, The Annals of the Faculty of Law, the database of the Faculty of Economics and Management Sciences, and the database of the Faculty of Health and Community Development, as well as a Research Ethics Committee.

== See also ==
- List of universities in the Democratic Republic of the Congo
- Education in the Democratic Republic of the Congo
