= Nyiragongo Cement =

Congolese cement company

- Company type: Public
- Industry: Building materials
- Headquarters: Bujovu, Karisimbi, Goma, North Kivu, Democratic Republic of the Congo
- Key people: Tana Twagira (General Manager)
- Products: Cement

Nyiragongo Cement (abbreviated as NC) is a cement manufacturing company based in Goma, North Kivu, in the eastern Democratic Republic of the Congo. Established on 1 April 2014, the company is headquartered in the Bujovu neighborhood of Karisimbi. Its cement production site is situated at the foot of Mount Nyiragongo, in the town of Kanyaruchinya, where its mining square is located. The company was inaugurated by Julien Paluku Kahongya, then governor of North Kivu, marking it as the province's first cement manufacturer.

== History ==
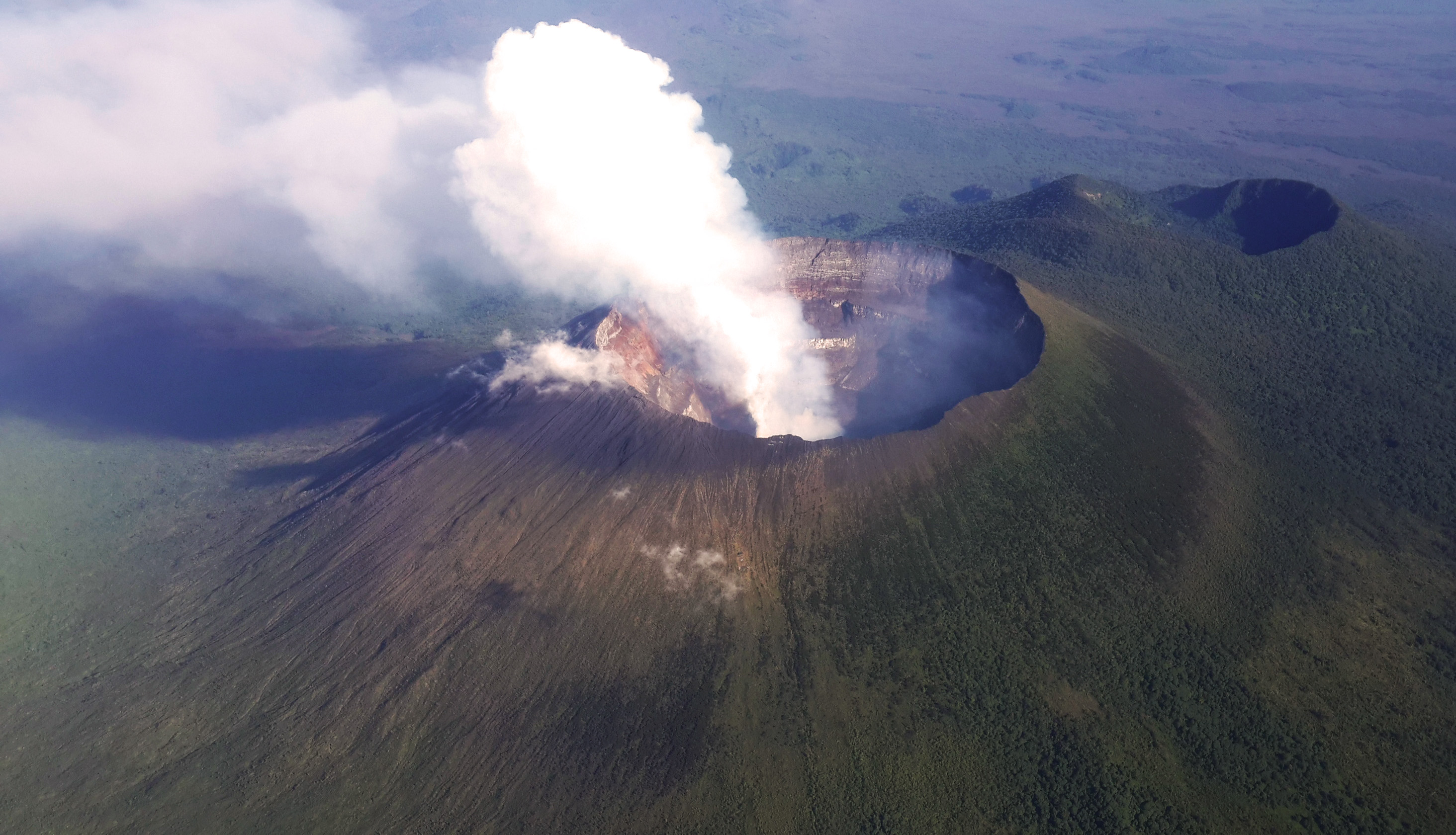
An aerial view of the towering volcanic peak of Mount Nyiragongo

Nyiragongo Cement was established as part of an initiative to utilize volcanic lava stones from Mount Nyiragongo for cement production. The project was conceived by Congolese entrepreneur Tana Twagira. According to International Cement Review, Nyiragongo Cement was officially launched on 1 April 2014 in a ceremony presided over by North Kivu Governor Julien Paluku Kahongya. It became the province's first cement manufacturer. However, alternative sources contend that the official inauguration transpired on 30 July 2015. The initiative received support from the Industry Promotion Fund (Fonds de la Promotion de l'Industrie, FPI), which backed Tana Twagira's vision for industrial development. The provincial government emphasized the project's potential to create employment opportunities and deter youth from joining armed groups. Governor Paluku also acknowledged the role of then-President Joseph Kabila in facilitating such economic ventures in North Kivu.

== Production ==
Nyiragongo Cement specializes in the production of Portland gray pozzolan cement, offering two quality grades: 32.5R and 42.5R. The company incorporates 5% limestone in its manufacturing process to enhance product quality. Initially, NC produced 7 tonnes of cement per day, but with the installation of new machinery, it aims to expand its daily output to 50 tonnes. Its "Made in Goma" products have already garnered commercial interest among North Kivu's local construction stakeholders. The plant operates using two generators, with capacities of 700 KVA and 500 KVA, to sustain its production needs.
