= Mapendo Lenganaiso =

Mapendo Lenganaiso is a women's rights activist in the Democratic Republic of the Congo.

She is head of the Beni branch of the NGO Solidarity of Women's Associations for the Rights of Women and Children (SAFDF), an organization receiving UNHCR support.
