= Katindo =

- Neighborhood
- Quartier Katindo
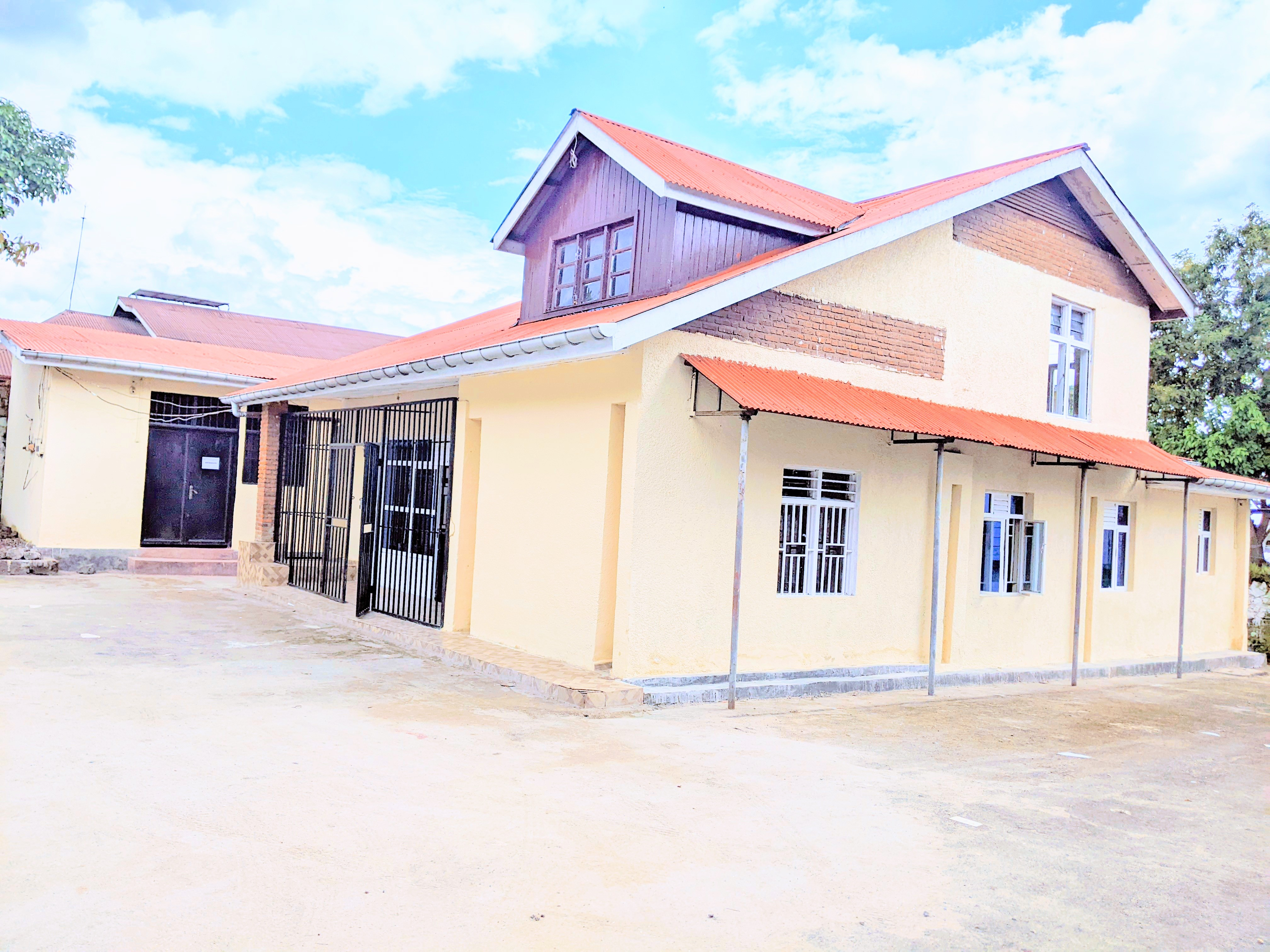
- The MESP office in Katindo, Goma, Goma
- Country: Democratic Republic of the Congo
- Province: North Kivu
- City: Goma
- Commune: Goma

Population (2014 est.)
  - Total: 50,860
- Official language: French
- National language: Kiswahili

Katindo is a neighborhood in the Goma commune of Goma, located in North Kivu, Democratic Republic of the Congo. Strategically located in the northern region of the city, it had an estimated population of 50,860 as of 2014. The neighborhood is situated north of the Goma-Sake road and south of Lake Kivu, with Les Volcans neighborhood to the east and Himbi to the west. Administratively, Katindo is divided into three cells and eight avenues.

== Government ==
Katindo is governed by a neighborhood chief, who is supported by two deputies—one male and one female—along with an administrative secretary and two census officials. Katindo is divided into three cells (cellule), each further subdivided into avenues, which are composed of multiple Nyumba Kumi (ten-house units). Introduced in 1997 by the Alliance of Democratic Forces for the Liberation of Congo (AFDL) and inspired by a similar model in Rwanda, the Nyumba Kumi system is overseen by appointed representatives under the supervision of the neighborhood chief. Each unit is responsible for managing ten households.

The neighborhood's administrative divisions are as follows:

Cell of 20 Juillet:

- Lake Avenue
- Masisi Avenue
- Maniema Avenue

RVA Cell:

- Beni Avenue
- Carmel Avenue

Golfe Cell:

- Bunagana Avenue
- La Frontière Avenue
- Ishasha Avenue

== History ==
Katindo was officially established on 22 May 1989, following Order No. 089-127, which reorganized and subdivided the urban area of Goma after the creation of North Kivu Province in 1988. Initially part of the former Mont Goma neighborhood, Katindo was formed alongside Himbi as a result of administrative restructuring based on geographic size. It subsequently became one of the 18 officially designated neighborhoods constituting the broader Goma city.

== Economy ==
Most residents engaged in trade and small businesses. The neighborhood is home to three informal marketplaces, collectively referred to as Limanga, strategically situated at Bitumingi (Beni Avenue), Carmel (Carmel Avenue), and Babanjabuka (Lake Avenue). Retail trade thrives through numerous boutiques, kiosks, hardware stores, food shops, carpentry workshops, sewing ateliers, and mills. Additionally, Katindo hosts savings cooperatives, hotels, pharmaceutical dispensaries, gas stations, and other commercial establishments.

The neighborhood also features a branch office of MECRE, a subsidiary of the microfinance institution MECREGO (Mutuelle d'Épargne et de Crédit de Goma).

== Environmental issues ==
Katindo faces waste management challenges. Improper disposal of rubbish is widespread, with waste accumulating along roads and streets due to the lack of adequate disposal sites. While some residents subscribe to private waste collection services such as BSC Sprl and T3S, these services are often irregular, leaving many without proper waste management solutions.

There's also lack of access to clean water, as many households rely on water from Lake Kivu due to the scarcity of standpipes. Although water is available in some avenues, a large portion of the population depends on lake water for daily use. Sanitation conditions are also problematic, with many household toilets poorly maintained. This is particularly evident on Masisi Avenue, where unhygienic conditions have contributed to waterborne diseases such as diarrhea and typhoid fever.
