= Goma Serena Hotel =

Hotel in Goma, North Kivu

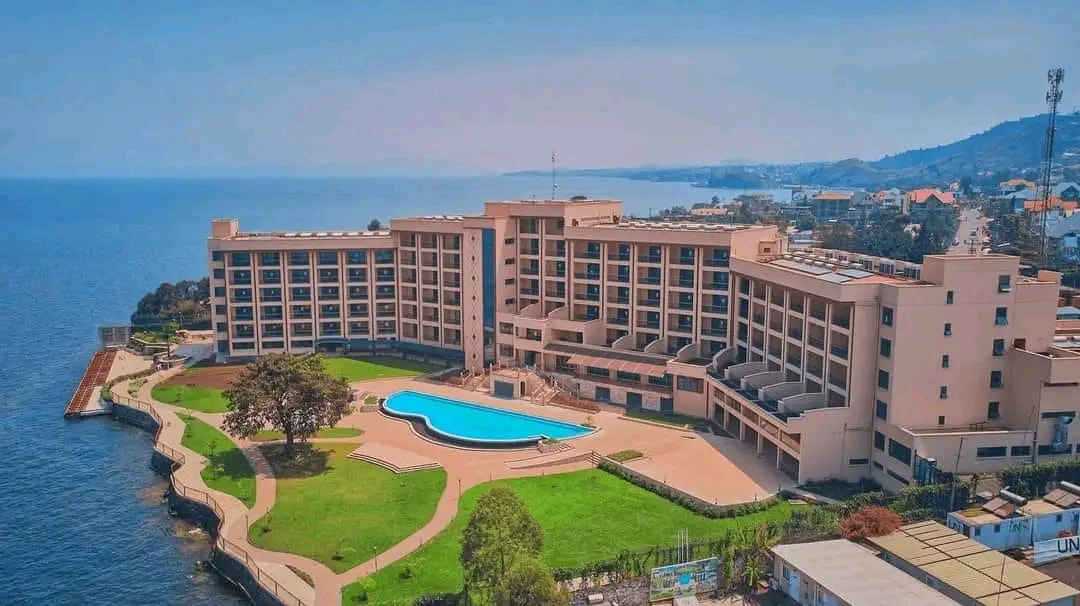
- Goma Serena Hotel in 2023
- Hotel chain: Serena Hotels

General information
- Location: Goma, North Kivu, Democratic Republic of the Congo
- Year built: 2010–2020
- Inaugurated: 15 September 2020; 6 years ago
- Client: Vanny Bishweka
- Owner: The hotel is owned by Congolese businessman Vanny Bishweka and managed by Serena Hotels.

Design and construction
- Awards: World Travel Awards – Democratic Republic of Congo's Leading Hotel (2022, 2023)

Other information
- Number of rooms: 110

Website
- serenahotels.com

Goma Serena Hotel is a five-star hotel in Goma, North Kivu, Democratic Republic of the Congo. Located on the northern shore of Lake Kivu, it is operated by Serena Hotels and was developed by Congolese businessman Vanny Bishweka. The hotel opened in September 2020. Facilities include accommodation, restaurants and lounges, conference and event spaces, a swimming pool, health club and spa. Nearby attractions include Virunga National Park, Kahuzi-Biéga National Park, Mount Nyiragongo and Lake Kivu. In 2022 and 2023, it won the Democratic Republic of the Congo's Leading Hotel award at the World Travel Awards.

== History ==
Congolese businessman Vanny Bishweka was the principal investor in the project, which took approximately ten years to construct. Bishweka also owned the Ihusi Hotel in Goma. Serena Hotels had initially planned to open the hotel in May 2020, but the opening was delayed by the COVID-19 pandemic. The hotel opened on 15 September 2020. The EastAfrican described it as the group's expansion into the DRC. The report identified the hotel as a five-star, lakefront property with 109 rooms, food-and-beverage outlets, a residents' lounge, and conference, meeting and banquet facilities.

Serena Hotels promoted the hotel as a base for attractions including mountain-gorilla trekking in Virunga National Park, excursions to Mount Nyiragongo, and boat trips on Lake Kivu. In September 2020, Goma hosted a regional diplomatic meeting involving the presidents of the DRC, Rwanda, Uganda, Burundi, and Angola at the Serena Hotel. In June 2021, additional bilateral agreements between Congolese president Félix Tshisekedi and Rwandan President Paul Kagame were scheduled to be signed at the hotel. The ninth edition of Liputa Fashion was scheduled to take place at the hotel in June 2023.

== Architecture ==
Its interiors and public areas incorporated references to Congolese culture, natural history and wildlife, with furniture and fittings designed in Nairobi and manufactured in Italy.

The original fact sheet listed 109 rooms: one presidential suite, one diplomatic suite, nine executive suites, nine junior suites, 11 superior deluxe rooms, nine twin deluxe rooms, and 69 king deluxe rooms. Serena Hotels' current website lists 110 rooms.

Food-and-beverage venues include Lac Kivu, an all-day dining restaurant; the Kahuzi-Biega Pool Bar and Terrace; the Bambara Lounge; and Nyiragongo Night Club. The hotel serves Congolese and other African dishes alongside international cuisine.

The Maisha Health Club and Spa has a gymnasium, aerobics studio, sauna, steam room and juice bar. The hotel also has an Olympic-size swimming pool and landscaped outdoor areas.

The hotel's lakefront location provides access to boat excursions and other water-based activities. Guestrooms and public areas overlook Lake Kivu. Other activities available in the area include mountain-gorilla and chimpanzee trekking, excursions to Mount Nyiragongo, water sports and city tours. Goma is near Virunga National Park, while Kahuzi-Biéga National Park is located in neighboring South Kivu.

== Awards ==
Year	Award	Category	Result	Ref.
2022	World Travel Awards	Democratic Republic of Congo's Leading Hotel	Won	
2023	World Travel Awards	Democratic Republic of Congo's Leading Hotel	Won	
