= Vanny Bishweka =

Congolese businessman

- Born: c. 1965; Birere, Goma, North Kivu
- Occupations: Businessman, hotelier
- Known for: Ihusi Hotel, Goma Serena Hotel
- Awards: Honoris causa title, Free University of the Great Lakes Countries (2023)

Vanny Bishweka (born c. 1965) is a Congolese businessman based in Goma, North Kivu. He owns the Ihusi Hotel and a Lake Kivu boat company of the same name, and has been described as the most influential businessman in Goma.

== Biography ==
=== Early life and beginnings ===
Born into a poor family in Birere, Goma's commercial district, Bishweka started out in small trade and transport, owning two of the city's six motorbikes, before building up trade with neighbouring cities and Rwanda. He also worked as a hardware dealer.

=== Career ===
In 1992 he began building the Ihusi Hotel on the shore of Lake Kivu, named after his father's village in South Kivu. Work stopped in 1994 because of unrest in Goma; the hotel was completed in 2001 and opened in 2002. It serves mainly aid organisations and business travellers. In 2016 he was building a second Ihusi hotel in Goma.

His investment made possible the Goma Serena Hotel, the city's first five-star hotel, which opened in 2020 after ten years of construction.

His Ihusi boats link Goma to Bukavu in about three hours, via Idjwi island. He owns two petrol stations and is a partner in the Tunisian firm EPPM, which exploits the lake's methane gas, and holds 20% of Socodee, a company that distributes electricity produced by Virunga Energie, a subsidiary of the Virunga National Park operator. He has said he holds 35% of Sococ, whose director general Modeste Makabuza was sentenced to one year in prison for embezzlement; Bishweka said he did not know whether funds had been misappropriated. He is reputed to be close to former president Joseph Kabila, which he denies. He has also financed buildings, petrol stations, roads and roundabouts in Goma. In 2023 the Free University of the Great Lakes Countries awarded him an honoris causa title. In May 2023 his lawyer issued a statement responding to allegations circulating on social media about his property.
