= Ndosho =

Neighborhood in Kasirimbi, Goma

- Neighborhood
- Quartier Ndosho
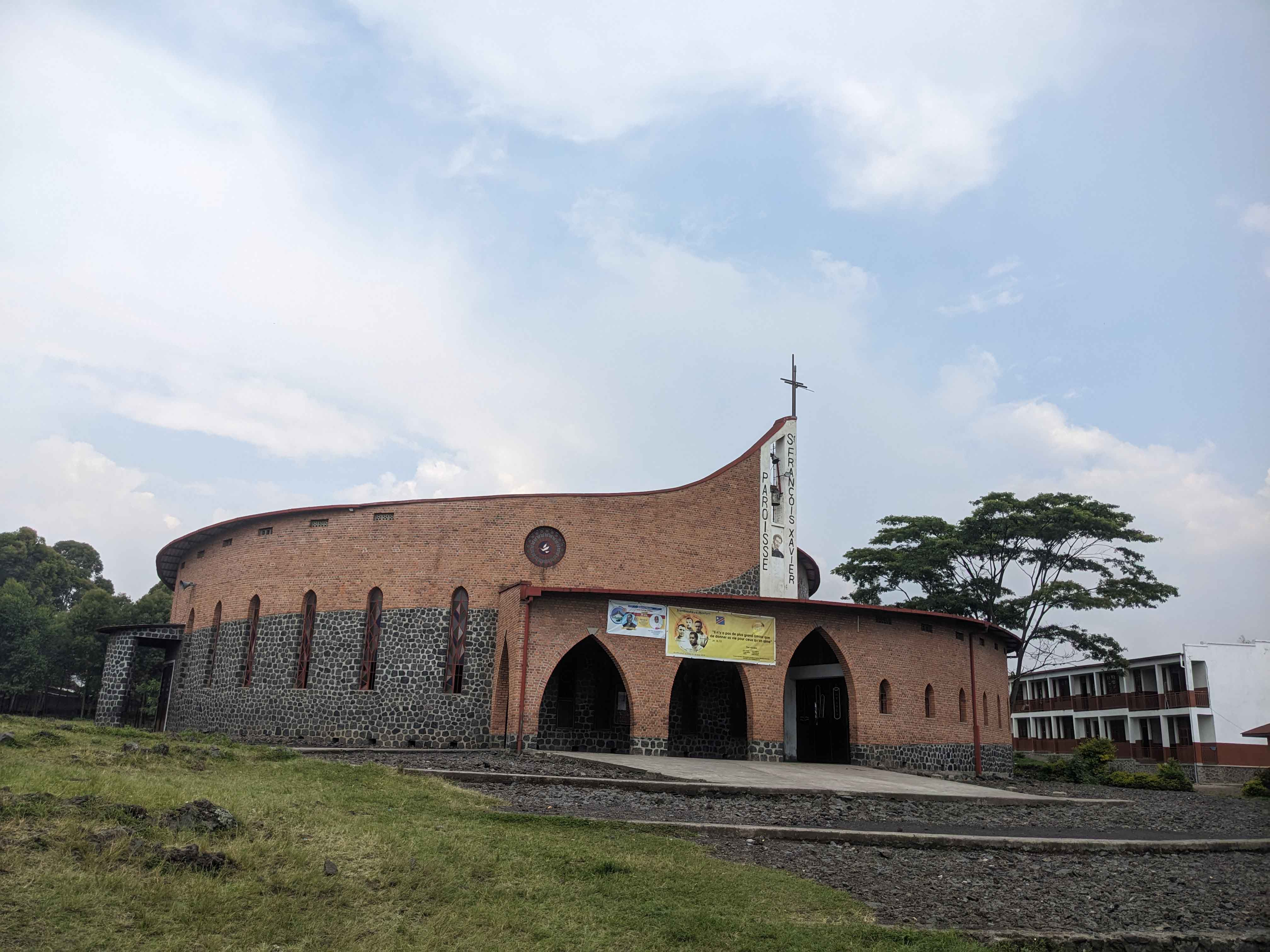
- The Parish of Saint François Xavier de Ndosho
- Country: Democratic Republic of the Congo
- Province: North Kivu
- City: Goma
- Commune: Karisimbi

Government
  - Chef de quartier: Bahati Lugere (since 16 April 2024)

Population (2017 est.)
  - Total: 20,823
- Official language: French
- National language: Kiswahili

Ndosho is a neighborhood in the Karisimbi commune of Goma, North Kivu, Democratic Republic of the Congo. It was historically an integral part of the adjacent Keshero neighborhood before gaining its own distinct administrative identity. The neighborhood is perched atop a hill and derives its name from the term "round stone" found between the villages of Kyeshero and Bugamba. As of 2017, Ndosho had an estimated population of 20, 823. It is bordered to the north by the Mudja groupement of Bukumu Chiefdom, to the south by the Goma-Sake Road and Keshero, to the east by Katoyi, and to the west by Mugunga. Administratively, Ndosho is divided into seven cells and 31 avenues.

== Geography ==
Ndosho experiences an oceanic climate, characterized by cool temperatures in the mornings and evenings, while daytime conditions are typically hot. However, the intense heat is often moderated by a sea breeze originating from Lake Kivu and coursing toward the Virunga volcanic range. The neighborhood's soil is entirely volcanic, shaped by successive eruptions of Mount Nyiragongo. Ndosho is situated at an altitude of 1,550 meters above sea level, with coordinates at approximately 1°41' south latitude and 19°13' east longitude. The area's topography consists of a plain to the east and a sandy hill in the central part of the neighborhood.

=== Administrative division ===
Ndosho is governed by a neighborhood chief, who is assisted by two deputies—one male and one female—alongside an administrative secretary and two designated census officials. This structure ensures organized management and communication within the community. The neighborhood is divided into seven cells, which are further subdivided into 31 avenues. Each avenue comprises multiple Nyumba Kumi (ten-house units), a local governance system introduced in 1997 by the Alliance of Democratic Forces for the Liberation of Congo (AFDL). Inspired by a similar administrative model in Rwanda, the Nyumba Kumi system is managed by appointed representatives under the supervision of the neighborhood chief, with each unit overseeing ten households.

==== Cells and avenues ====
1. Munanira Cell (5 avenues):
  - Cinq Chantier Avenue
  - Rulenga Avenue
  - Mutwanga Avenue
  - Garamba Avenue
  - Kito Avenue
2. Écoles Cell (4 avenues):
  - Mitumba Avenue
  - Carrière Avenue
  - Kako Avenue
  - Avenue of Democracy
3. Ndebo Cell (5 avenues):
  - Luapula Avenue
  - Ubangi Avenue
  - Rengaa Avenue
  - Itimbiri Avenue
  - Kiwandja Avenue
4. CAJED Cell (5 avenues):
  - Lulua Avenue
  - Ngungu Avenue
  - Orphelinat Avenue
  - Minova Avenue
  - Kalima Avenue
5. Salama Cell (4 avenues):
  - Kabasha Avenue I
  - Kabasha Avenue II
  - Bugamba Avenue
  - Muhabura Avenue
6. Ndihira Cell (5 avenues):
  - Rwasama Avenue
  - Ileo-Songo Avenue
  - Kalondji Avenue
  - Kasavubu Avenue
  - Kanyamuhanga Avenue
7. Okapi Cell (3 avenues):
  - Kisasu Avenue
  - Avenue Maendeleo
  - Lusuli Avenue

== History ==
The neighborhood traces its roots to an expansion of the adjacent Keshero neighborhood, with its name stemming from a term meaning "round stone", a nod to the geological formation on which it sits. Historically, Ndosho developed as a result of the merging of the villages of Keshero and Bugamba, forming a settlement within the larger Mudja groupement of Bukumu Chiefdom. Ndosho's administrative status underwent a significant alteration after Presidential Decree No. 89-127 of 22 May 1989, which redefined Goma's territorial organization and formally designated Ndosho as an independent neighborhood, independent from its previous connection to Keshero.

== Demographics ==
As of 2017, Ndosho has a population of 20, 823 residents. The neighborhood is ethnically diverse, with the majority of its population belonging to Bantu-speaking groups. Notable ethnic communities include the Hutu, Nande, Shi, Nyanga, and Tembo, among others.

=== Health ===
Ndosho is home to one of Goma's main healthcare facilities, the CBCA Hospital, operated by the Community of Baptist Churches in Central Africa (CBCA). Malaria is the most prevalent parasitic disease in the area and remains a significant health concern. According to a study by the malaria control program in North Kivu, 1,142,282 cases of malaria were reported in 2010, with 7,963 pregnant women affected. The disease led to 1,498 deaths, representing a mortality rate of 0.06%. Additionally, 63,647 insecticide-treated mosquito nets were distributed to combat malaria. In the period between 2014 and 2015, 1,358 cases of malaria were recorded in Goma, with a population of 20,192, resulting in a prevalence rate of 6.7%. A slight decrease was noted in 2016, with 1,247 cases reported out of a population of 20,823 inhabitants.

== Economy ==
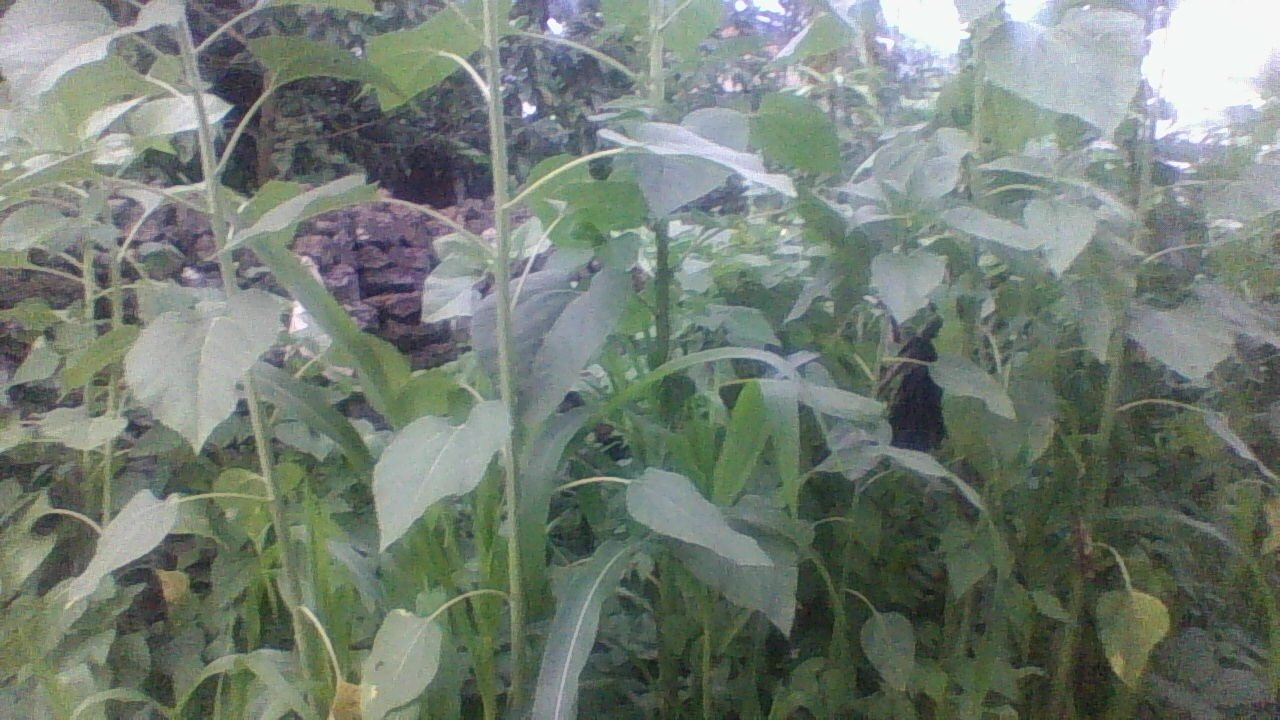
A garden in Ndosho

The neighborhood relies on small-scale trade, agriculture, livestock farming, and stone breaking. Ndosho has two markets that serve as central hubs for the exchange of manufactured goods. Many residents rely on small trade for their livelihoods, with prices being relatively well-controlled. Agriculture and livestock breeding are also key economic activities, with local farmers engaging in the cultivation of crops and raising animals. Some residents are also involved in stone breaking and masonry. Ndosho is home to the Mecre Ndosho cooperative.
