= Ruwenzori =

Ruwenzori may refer to:

- Rwenzori Mountains in Uganda and the Democratic Republic of the Congo
- Ruwenzori (commune), part of the town of Beni, Nord-Kivu, Democratic Republic of the Congo
