= Karisimbi =

Karisimbi may refer to:

- Mount Karisimbi, an inactive volcano in the Virunga Mountains
- Karisimbi (commune), an administrative division of Goma, Democratic Republic of the Congo
