= Goma (commune) =

Commune in Goma, North Kivu

Coordinates: 1.6933°S 29.2252°E

- Commune
- Commune de Goma
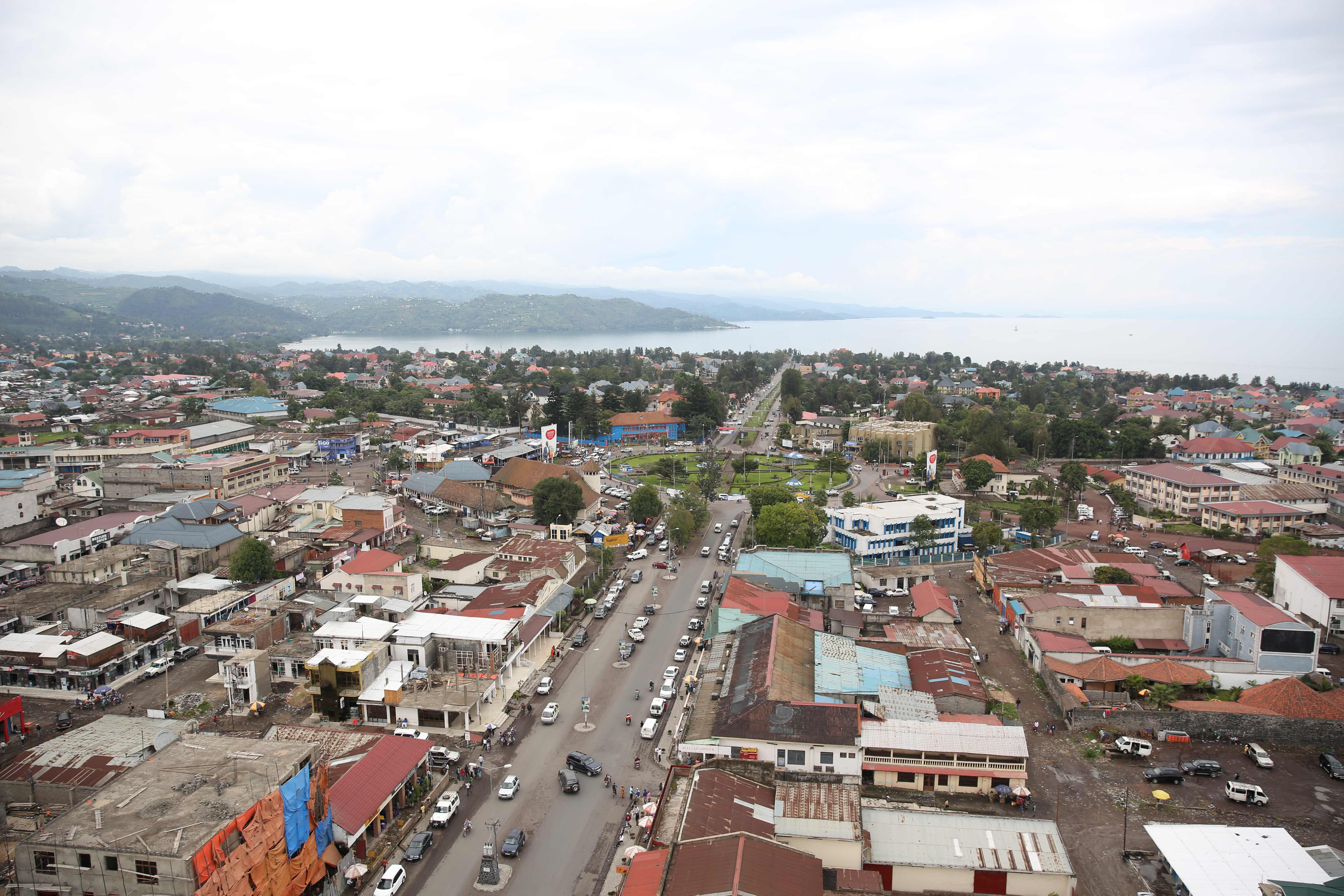
- Interactive map of Goma
- Country: DR Congo
- Province: North Kivu
- City: Goma

Population (2018 est.)
  - Total: 333,727
- Official language: French
- National language: Kiswahili

Goma is a commune located in the city of Goma, within North Kivu Province in the eastern Democratic Republic of the Congo. Covering an area of 33,245 square kilometers, it forms the southernmost part of the city while also including sections of its eastern and western regions. As of 2018, the commune's population was estimated at approximately 333,727 residents. Goma is bordered by Lake Kivu to the south, the Republic of Rwanda to the east, Karisimbi commune to the north, and Masisi Territory to the west.

Administratively, it is divided into seven neighborhoods—Mikeno, Mapendo, Les Volcans, Katindo, Keshero, Himbi, and Lac Vert—which are further subdivided into 24 cells and 125 avenues. Serving as a political and administrative hub, the commune hosts nearly all of Goma's governmental and administrative activities.

== Geography ==
Goma commune is geographically delineated by Karisimbi commune to the north, Lake Kivu to the south, the Republic of Rwanda to the east, and Masisi Territory to the west.

=== Administrative subdivision ===
The commune of Goma was officially established through Ordinance Law No. 89-127 on 22 May 1989. In accordance with the law, both the city and commune are recognized as decentralized administrative entities vested with legal personality, while neighborhoods within them function as "administrative entities without representation or legal personality" (Article II, Ordinance Law No. 82-006). Furthermore, the neighborhoods are divided into smaller units, including avenues, cells (cellules), and nyumba kumi (groups of ten houses overseen by an individual appointed by the neighborhood chief).

The commune is subdivided administratively into seven distinct neighborhoods:

1. Les Volcans: Established under Ordinance Law No. 82-066 on 25 February 1982, in alignment with the territorial, political, and administrative organization of the Republic of Zaire, as outlined in Articles 4 and 5 of the same law, and further reinforced by Ordinance Law No. 88-176 on 15 November 1988. It shares boundaries with Murara neighborhood to the north, Lake Kivu to the south, the Mapendo and Mikeno neighborhoods, Rwanda to the east, and Katindo neighborhood to the west. This neighborhood is partitioned into three cells and 36 avenues.
2. Lac Vert: This neighborhood was constituted by Ordinance Law No. 89-127 on 22 May 1989. Prior to its formal creation, Lac Vert was part of Masisi Territory, located explicitly within the Kamuronza groupement under the Bahunde Chiefdom in the North Kivu sub-region. Geographically, it is situated to the west of Goma, approximately 18 kilometers from the city center, along the Goma-Sake Road. It is bounded by Sake Road to the north, Lake Kivu to the south, Keshero neighborhood to the east, and Virunga National Park to the west. Lac Vert is subdivided into five cells and 15 avenues.
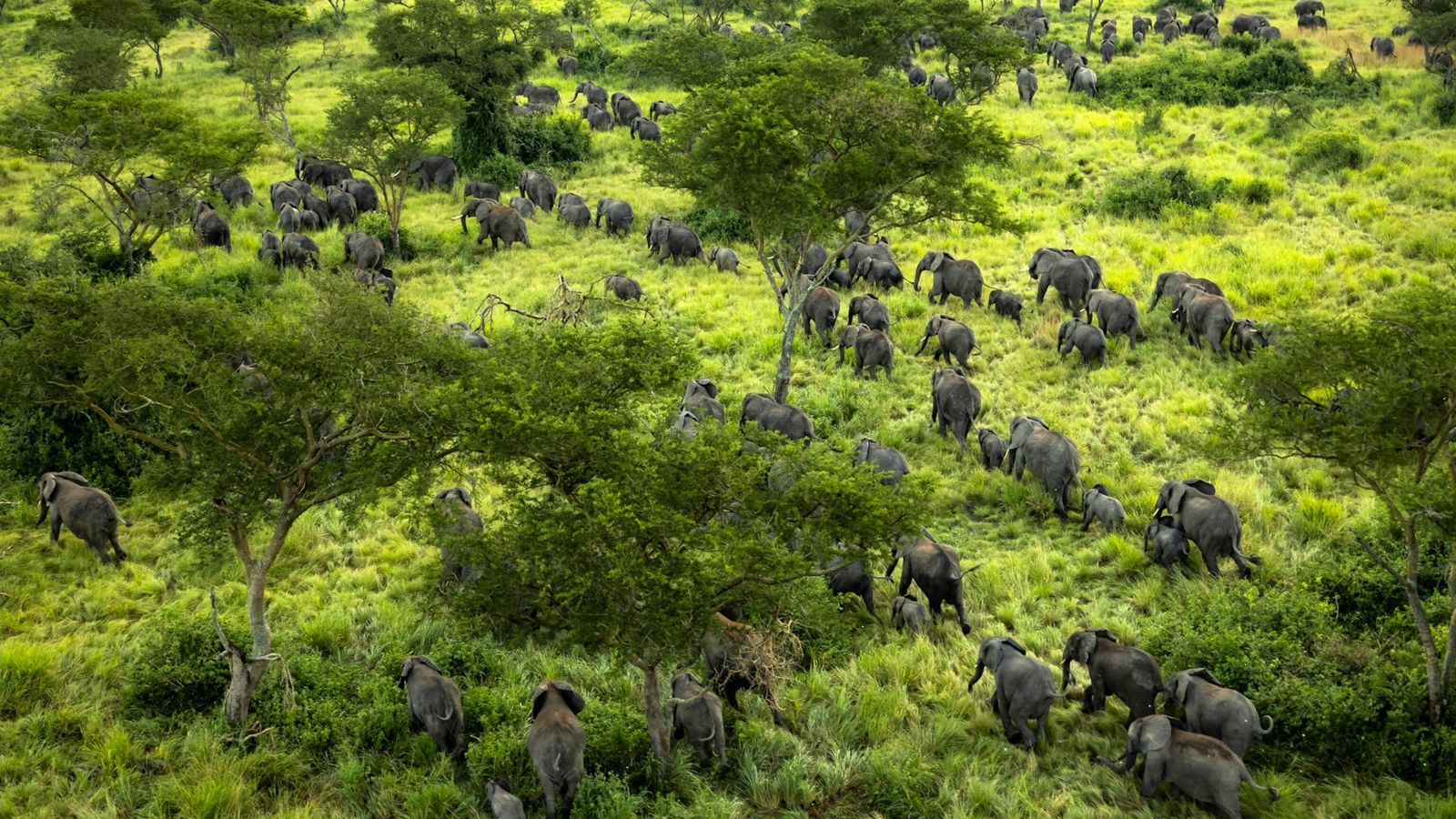
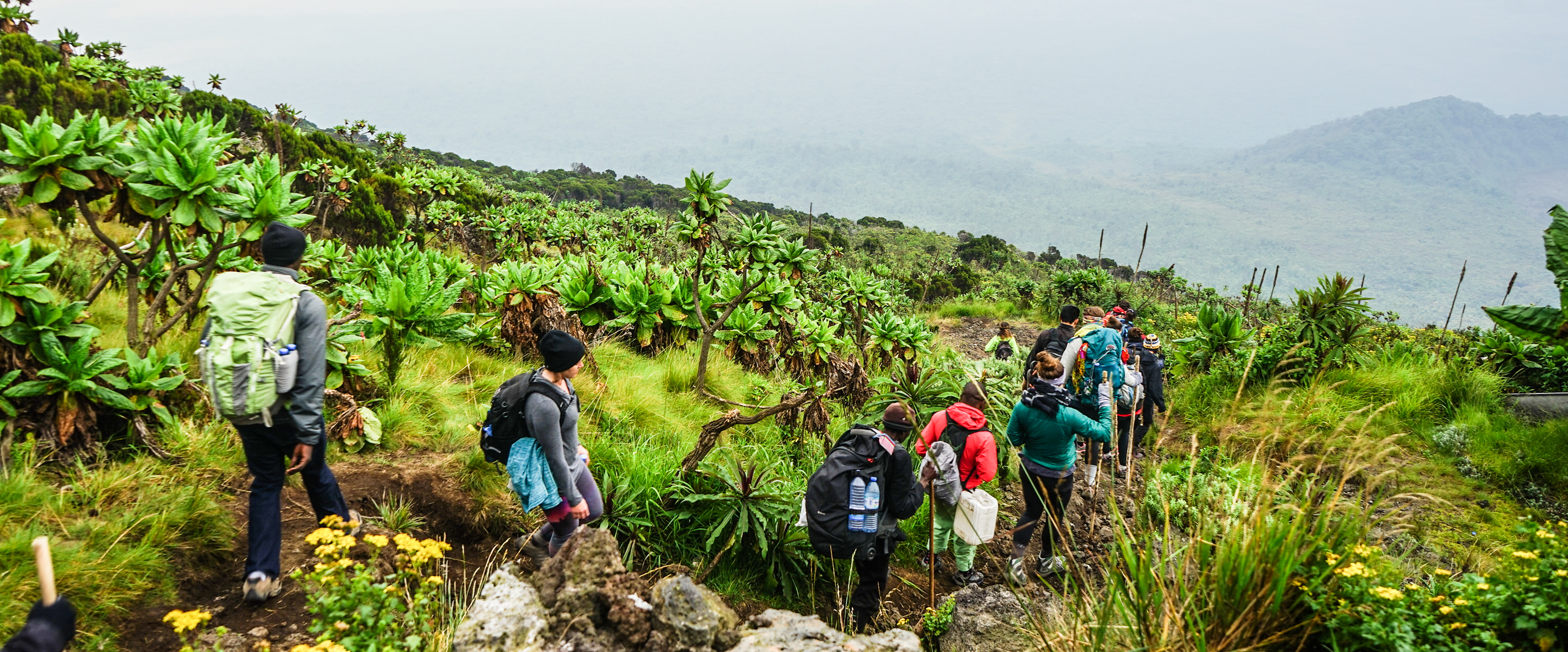
  Virunga National Park
3. Katindo: This neighborhood lies north of the Goma-Sake road, south of Lake Kivu, east of Les Volcans neighborhood, and west of Himbi neighborhood. It comprises three cells and eight avenues.
4. Mapendo: The Mapendo neighborhood consists of two cells and eleven avenues.
5. Mikeno (or Birere): Established through Ordinance Law No. 89-127 on 22 May 1989, Mikeno was initially referred to as localité Mikeno prior to the administrative reconfiguration of Goma in 1989. In November 1998, during the rise of the Rally for Congolese Democracy (RCD), Mikeno was further divided, leading to the creation of the adjacent Mapendo neighborhood. Mikeno is bounded north by the Murara and Kahembe neighborhoods and south by the Les Volcans neighborhood. It is divided into three cells and nine avenues.
6. Himbi: Himbi neighborhood was established by Decree No. 035 on 11 November 1998. It consists of 3 cells and 11 avenues. Himbi is bordered to the north by Sake Road, to the south by Lake Kivu, to the east by Katindo neighborhood, and the west by Keshero neighborhood.
7. Keshero: Historically known as localité Keshero, this neighborhood functioned under the jurisdiction of the community chief of Bukumu Chiefdom in Nyiragongo Territory. Initially inhabited by the Havu people, Keshero later attracted populations from other areas such as Sake, Masisi Territory, and Rutshuru Territory, particularly around 1954-1955. Keshero was officially recognized through Ordinance Law No. 89-127 on 22 May 1989, with its organizational structure formalized by Order No. 14/07/CAB/GP-NK/2000 on 14 July 2000. The neighborhood is bounded by Goma-Sake Road to the north, Lake Kivu to the south, Himbi neighborhood to the east, and Lac Vert neighborhood to the west. Keshero is subdivided into seven cells and 56 avenues.
