= Lubumbashi (commune) =

Commune in the city of Lubumbashi in the Democratic Republic of the Congo

Coordinates: 11°39′53″S 27°28′46″E

Lubumbashi is a commune of the city of Lubumbashi in the Democratic Republic of the Congo. It is located in the Haut-Katanga Province.
