= Bulengera =

Commune in the North Kivu Province, Democratic Republic of the Congo

- Commune
- Location within Democratic Republic of the Congo
- Coordinates: 0.15°N 29.33°E
- Country: Democratic Republic of the Congo
- Province: North Kivu
- City: Butembo

Bulengera is the most populous commune of the city of Butembo in North Kivu, Democratic Republic of the Congo.

In 2016, the Congolese military accidentally hit a school in the commune with a rocket while fighting against rebels from a local Christian millenarianist sect. In 2026, the commune experienced a wave of mob violence including a lynching of woman accused of witchcraft.

The commune has also occasionally been attacked by Mai-Mai militias as part of the ongoing Kivu conflict.
