= Mangobo =

- Commune
- Location in Democratic Republic of the Congo
- Country: DR Congo
- Province: Tshopo
- City: Kisangani

Mangobo is a commune in western Kisangani, Democratic Republic of the Congo. At the time of the Belgian Congo its name was Belge I (Belgian I). It is located near the Congo and Tshopo rivers.
