= Université Divina Gloria de Butembo =

Private university in Butembo, Democratic Republic of the Congo

- Type: Private university
- Established: 2000
- Rector: Mathieu Kirongozi Bometa
- Location: Butembo, North Kivu, Democratic Republic of the Congo
- Language: French

Université Divina Gloria de Butembo (UDGB) is a private institution of higher education located in Butembo, in North Kivu Province, Democratic Republic of the Congo. Founded in 2000, it is recognised by the country's Ministry of Higher and University Education.

== History ==
UDGB was founded in 2000 and is recognised by the Ministry of Higher and University Education. It is based in Butembo, a city in North Kivu that is home to several universities and higher-education institutions.

== Organisation and leadership ==
The university is headed by a rector, Mathieu Kirongozi Bometa, and a vice-rector, Kakule Mumbere Kasindi.

=== Faculties ===
The university has seven faculties:

- Faculty of Arts and Humanities (English, French, history)
- Faculty of Management and Computer Science
- Faculty of Pharmacy
- Faculty of Psychology and Educational Sciences
- Faculty of Sciences (biology, geology)
- Faculty of Social, Political and Administrative Sciences (administration, political science, social sciences)
- Faculty of Theology

=== Teaching ===
Teaching is in French. Admission requires the State Diploma (diplôme d'État). The academic year runs from October to June in two terms (October–February and March–June). The university awards graduat and licence degrees, notably in management information systems, psychology and theology. It is coeducational.

== Student life and activities ==
UDGB hosts awareness and training activities open to students. In 2024, for example, the MAARIFA GLOBAL network held a discussion session there on the consumption of locally made products, as it did at other universities in Butembo.

== See also ==
- List of universities in the Democratic Republic of the Congo
- Catholic University of Graben
