= Beu, Beni =

Commune of the city of Beni, North Kivu Province, DR Congo

Beu
- Commune
- Location of Beu in the DR Congo
- Coordinates: 0.4885°N 29.4590°E
- Country: Democratic Republic of the Congo
- Province: North Kivu
- City: Beni

Beu is a commune of the city of Beni in North Kivu, Democratic Republic of the Congo. The headquarters of the city's administration and the Urban Coordination of Civil Protection are located in Beu.
