= Mwene-Ditu Airport =

Airport in Democratic Republic of the Congo

- IATA: none; ICAO: FZWE

Summary
- Airport type: Public
- Serves: Mwene-Ditu
- Elevation AMSL: 3,198 ft / 975 m
- Coordinates: 6°58′50″S 23°26′05″E

Map
- Location of the airport in Democratic Republic of the Congo

Runways
Direction	Length		Surface
Direction	m	ft	Surface
16/34	1,100	3,609	Grass
- Sources: GCM Google Maps

Mwene-Ditu Airport (ICAO: FZWE) is an airport serving the city of Mwene-Ditu in Lomami Province, Democratic Republic of the Congo.

== See also ==
- Transport in the Democratic Republic of the Congo
- List of airports in the Democratic Republic of the Congo
