= Kisangani (commune) =

- Commune
- Location in Democratic Republic of the Congo
- Country: DR Congo
- Province: Tshopo
- City: Kisangani

Kisangani is a commune in the center of Kisangani city, the capital of Tshopo province, in the Democratic Republic of the Congo.
