= Bondoyi =

Commune of the city of Mwene-Ditu in the Democratic Republic of the Congo

- Commune
- Location within Democratic Republic of the Congo
- Coordinates: 7°00′S 23°27′E
- Country: Democratic Republic of the Congo
- Province: Lomami Province
- City: Mwene-Ditu

Bondoyi is a commune of the city of Mwene-Ditu in the Lomami Province of the Democratic Republic of the Congo.
