= Zongo, Sud-Ubangi (DR Congo) =

Zongo
- City
- Ville de Zongo
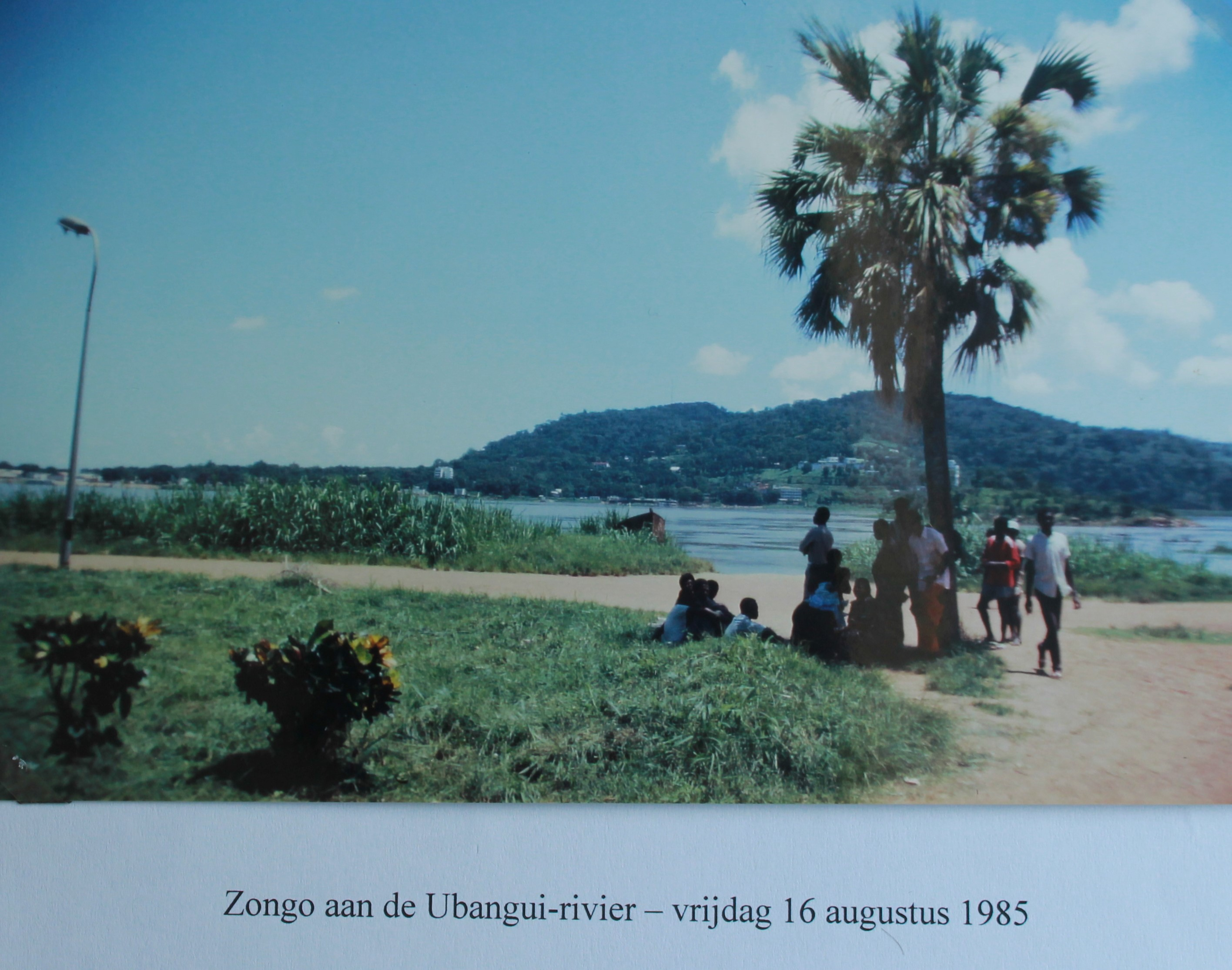
- View on the bank of the Ubangi river, in Zongo, Sud-Ubangi, DRC - (August 16, 1985)

- Location within Democratic Republic of the Congo
- Coordinates: 4°20′36″N 18°35′34″E
- Country: DR Congo
- Province: Sud-Ubangi
- City status: 23 July 1971
- Communes: Nzulu, Wango

Government
  - Mayor: Arthur Nguma

Area
  - Total: 495 km^{2} (191 sq mi)

Population (2007)
  - Total: 53,743
  - Density: 109/km^{2} (281/sq mi)
- Time zone: UTC+1 (WAT)
- Climate: Aw

Zongo is a city in Sud-Ubangi Province in the northwestern part of the Democratic Republic of Congo, lying on the south bank of the Ubangi River, across from Bangui in the Central African Republic. It is linked by ferry to Bangui but has declined in importance as a transport hub since much traffic moved east in the late 1980s.

By the end of the First Congo War, the city was controlled by the Movement for the Liberation of Congo. In 2001 the city saw an influx of refugees from the Central African Republic, the government of which alleged former soldiers among them were behind an attempted coup in Bangui in 2002.

During the 2012-13 Central African Republic conflict, refugees from the Central African Republic capital of Bangui, including many family members of President François Bozizé, fled here after the capital fell to Séléka rebels on 24 March 2013.

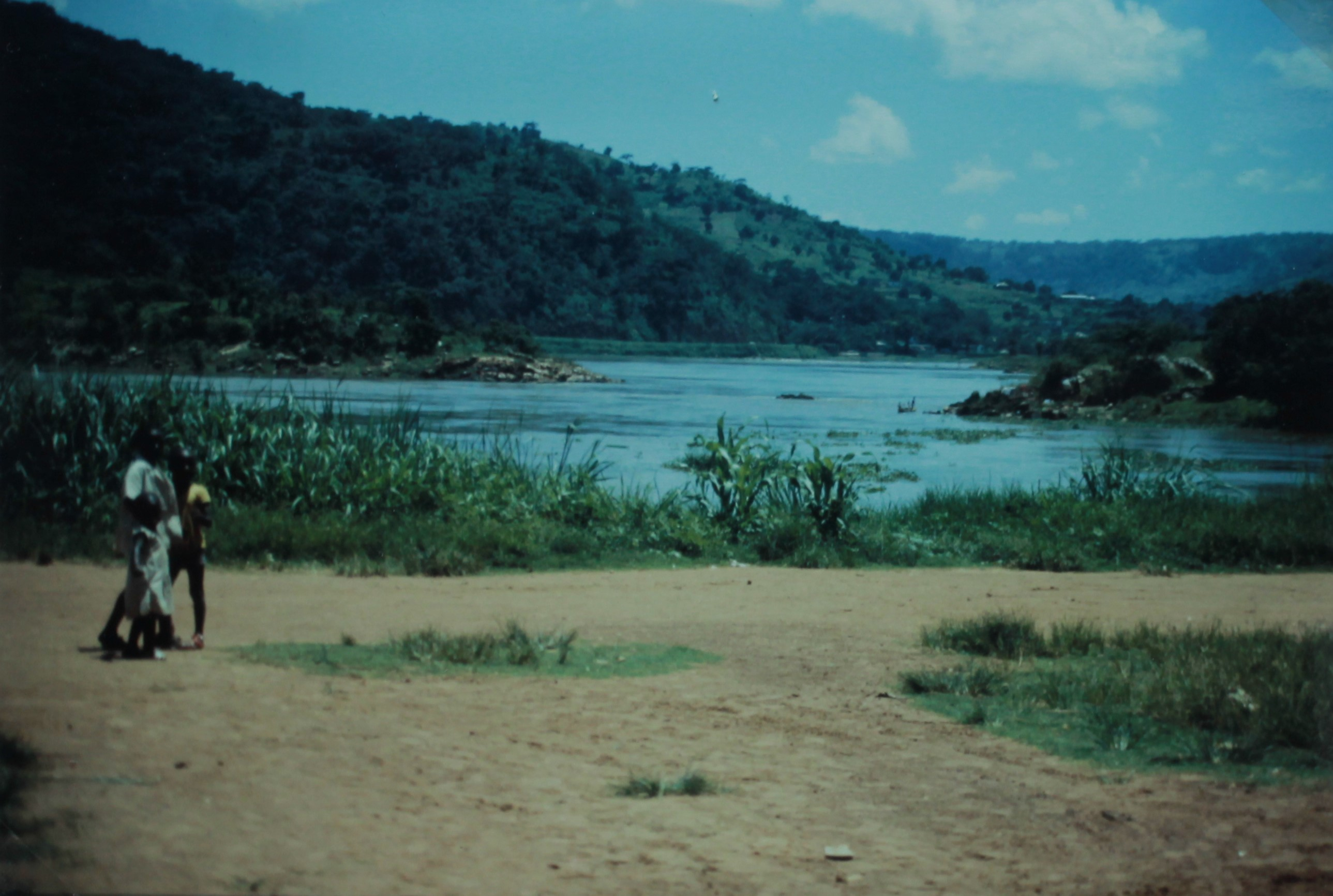
The Ubangi river in Zongo, Province of Sud-Ubangi in the DR Congo - (August 16, 1985).
