= Kabondo, Kisangani =

Kabondo
- Commune
- Country: DR Congo
- Province: Tshopo
- City: Kisangani

Kabondo, formerly commune of Brussels, is a north-eastern commune of the city of Kisangani, the capital of Tshopo province, in the Democratic Republic of the Congo.
