= Annexe, Lubumbashi =

Commune in the Democratic Republic of the Congo

Annexe is a commune in the Democratic Republic of the Congo. It is part of the city of Lubumbashi, in the Haut-Katanga Province. As of 2025, Mireille Kileshie is the mayor of Annexe.
