= AS Makinku =

AS Makinku is a football club in Mwene-Ditu, Democratic Republic of Congo. They play in the Linafoot, the top level of professional football in DR Congo.
