= Nzulu =

- Commune
- Country: DR Congo
- Province: Sud-Ubangi
- City: Zongo

Nzulu is a commune in the city of Zongo in the Democratic Republic of Congo.
