= Ruashi =

Commune in the city of Lubumbashi in the Democratic Republic of the Congo

Coordinates: 11°37′46″S 27°32′46″E

Ruashi (or Rwashi) is a commune of the city of Lubumbashi in the Democratic Republic of the Congo. It is located in the Haut-Katanga Province. It is the location of the Ruashi mine.
