= Makiso =

- Commune
- Location in Democratic Republic of the Congo
- Country: DR Congo
- Province: Tshopo
- City: Kisangani

Makiso, formerly Stanley, is a commune in the center of the city of Kisangani, the capital of Tshopo province, in the Democratic Republic of Congo . It includes a shopping area.
