= Wangata =

- Commune
- Location within Democratic Republic of the Congo
- Country: DR Congo
- Province: Équateur
- City: Mbandaka

Wangata is a commune in the city of Mbandaka, the capital of Équateur province, in the Democratic Republic of Congo.
