= Butembo =

- City
- Ville de Butembo
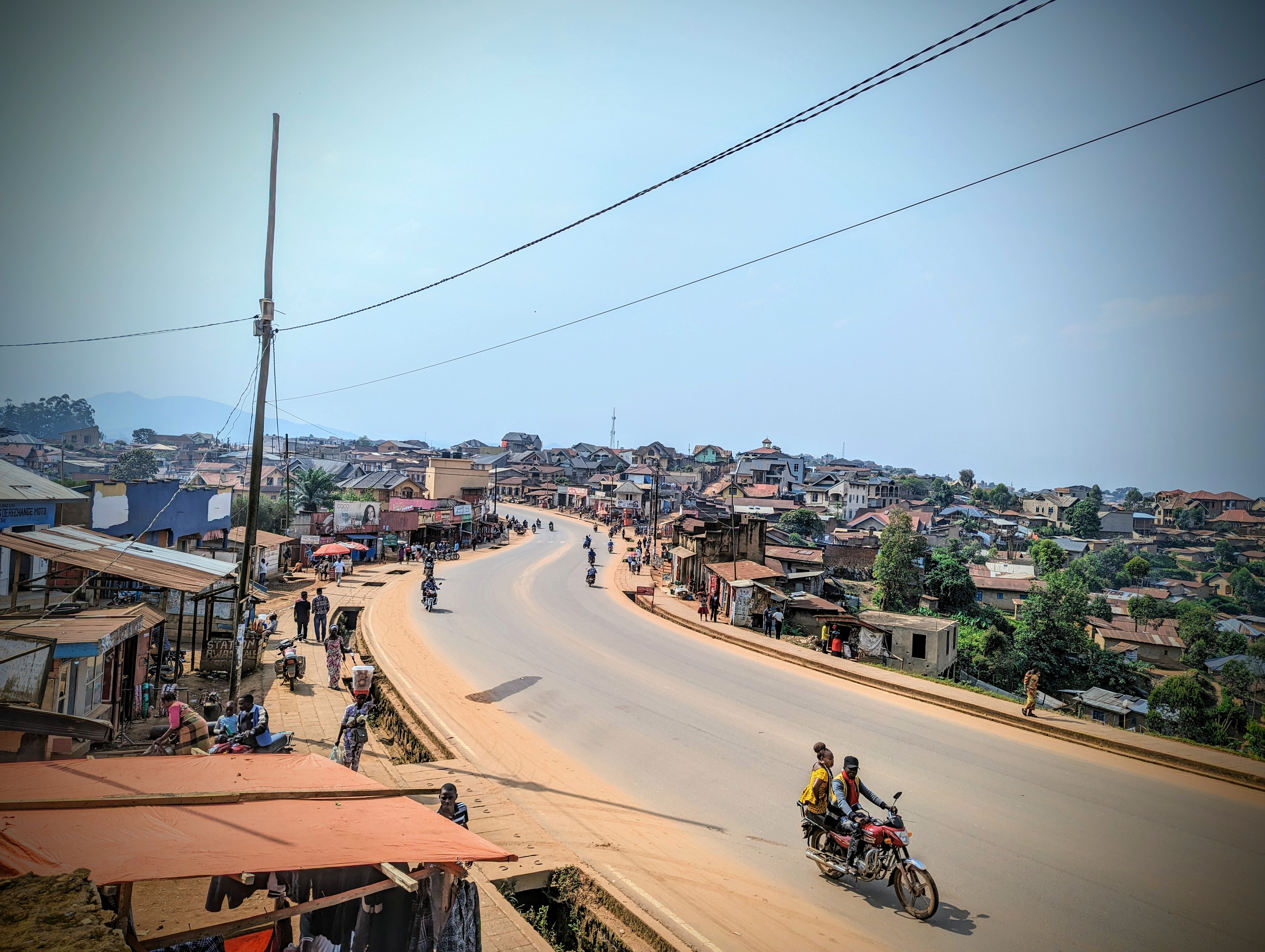

- Location in Democratic Republic of the Congo
- Coordinates: 00°07′40″N 29°17′15″E
- Country: DR Congo
- Province: North Kivu
- City status: 2001
- Communes: Bulengera, Kimemi, Mususa, Vulamba

Government
  - Mayor: Sylvain Kanyamanda Mbusa

Area
  - Total: 190.34 km^{2} (73.49 sq mi)
- Elevation: 1,750 m (5,740 ft)

Population (2026)
  - Total: 404,444
  - Density: 2,124.9/km^{2} (5,503.3/sq mi)
  - Ethnicities: 90% - Banande/Bayira
- Time zone: UTC+2 (Central Africa Time)
- Climate: Cfb

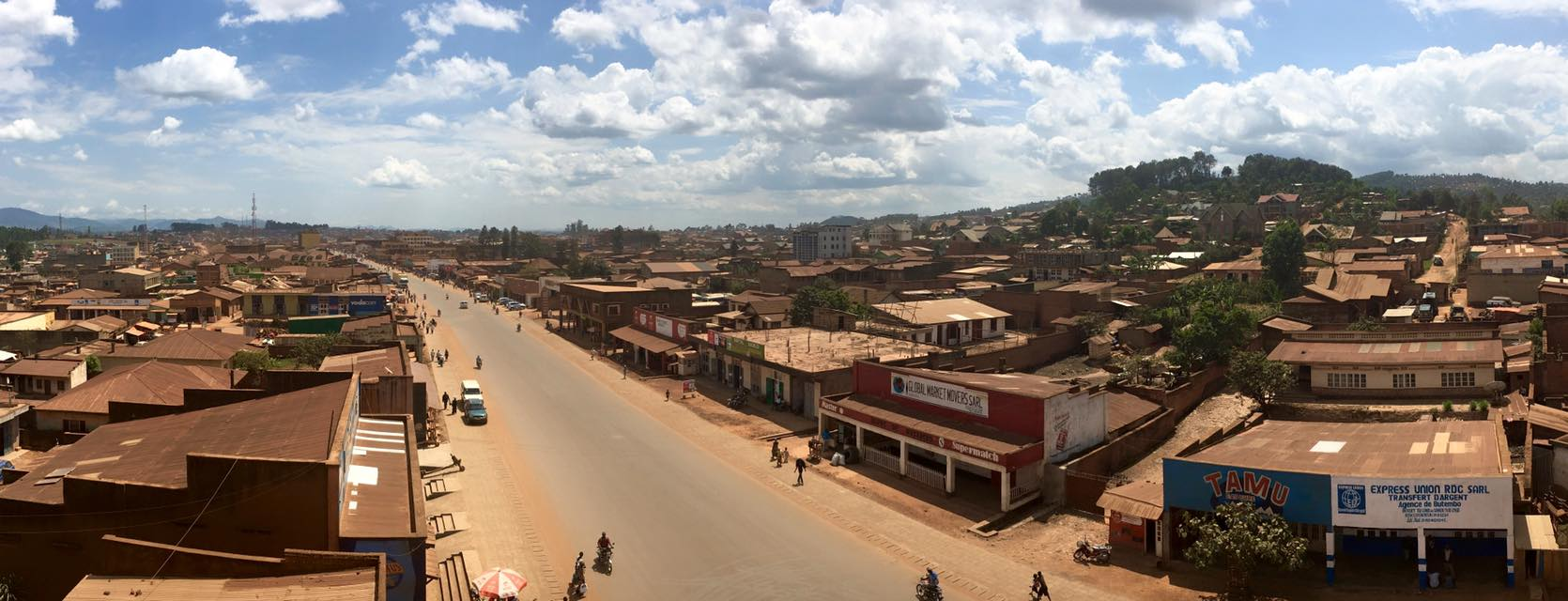
Taken from the Airtel building. This picture was taken before the road was painted with lanes.

Butembo is a city in North Kivu province, in the north eastern Democratic Republic of Congo, on the Rwenzori graben and west of Virunga National Park. The city is an important commercial centre with large markets, a cathedral, multiple large hospitals, and an airport. It is the city where the most prosperous businessmen of the East of the country live. The city is located in a region known for tea and coffee growing. As of 2026 it had an estimated population of 404,444.

== Overview ==
Butembo is 90% populated by the Nande tribe, a community distinguished by ethnic solidarity, conservative moral standards and influential leaders.

The city is home to the 2nd Integrated Brigade of the Armed Forces of the Democratic Republic of the Congo, the Institut Kambali, founded in 1959, the Université catholique du Graben (UCG), founded in 1989, and the Adventist University of Lukanga (UNILUK), founded in 1979.

== Geography ==
A marker indicating the line of the equator is about twenty-five kilometers south of the city.

Area: 190.3 km^{2}, three times larger than the city of Goma.

Population: 2,000,000 inhabitants, mostly from the Nande tribe.

Altitude: 1,381m. Location: 44 km from Lubero, 54 km from Beni and 307 km from Goma.

It straddles the two territories of Lubero (territory) and Beni (territory). The Musienene Special Economic Zone is located 17 km south of the city.

== Demographics ==
French, Swahili and Kinande are all spoken in the city. Butembo is 90% populated by the Nande tribe.

== Administration ==
Administratively, Butembo has four communes: Bulengera, Kimemi, Mususa and Vulamba. Following various flows of displaced persons fleeing the war, the city has seen its population grow rapidly. It has about two million inhabitants, a 2022 estimate.

The city has 28 quarters (fr quartiers), distributed as follows:

1. Bulengera commune has 9 quarters: Kalemire, Kamesi Mbonzo, Kimbulu, Kyaghala, Mukuna, Mutiri, Rughenda, Wayene and Eveché.

2. Kimemi commune has 8 quarters: Biondi, Bwinyole, Commercial, Lumumba, Malende, Ngerengere, Vutetshe and Vutsundo.

3. Mususa commune has 7 quarters: Bwinongo, Katwa, Kitulu, Matanda, Ngingi, Vigholo and Vungi.

4. Vulamba commune has 4 quarters: Congo Ya Sika, Kambali, Matembe and Mukalangura.

Butembo brings together all twelve Yira (Nande) clans, which is why it is considered the extra-customary capital of this people.

== Economy ==
The main activities of its inhabitants are trade, agriculture and livestock. Butembo is built thanks to the dynamism of its inhabitants alone.

Indeed, thanks to the fallout from trade with especially the countries of East Africa, the Middle and the Far East, the city is gradually being endowed with new buildings and charming private residences and it has become the warehouse of goods that supply the cities of Beni (city), Bunia, Kisangani, Goma, Bukavu, Kindu, Isiro, Buta, Bumba, and many others.

The merchants of the city have their own airlines. Butembo has a hundred industries of coffee, cocoa, beverages, sheet metal, tar, candy,...

The surrounding villages are home to tea, coffee, cocoa and cinchona plantations.

== Education ==
Butembo is home to a large number of quality educational institutions recognized in the Great Lakes region.

=== Universities ===
- Université Divina Gloria de Butembo
- Graben Catholic University, founded in 1989
- Africans Bakhita faculties, founded in 2002
- Lukanga Adventist University
- Free University of the Great Lakes Region, founded in 2000
- Official University of Ruwenzori (UOR)
- University of the Assumption in Congo (UAC), founded in 1982
- Kasugho University of Nature Conservation and Development (UCNDK)
- Higher Pedagogical Institute of Muhangi
- Institute of Buildings and Public Works (IBTP)
- Higher Institute of Applied Chemistry (ISCA)
- Higher Institute of Commerce (ISC BUTEMBO)

=== High schools ===
- Malkia Wa Mbingu

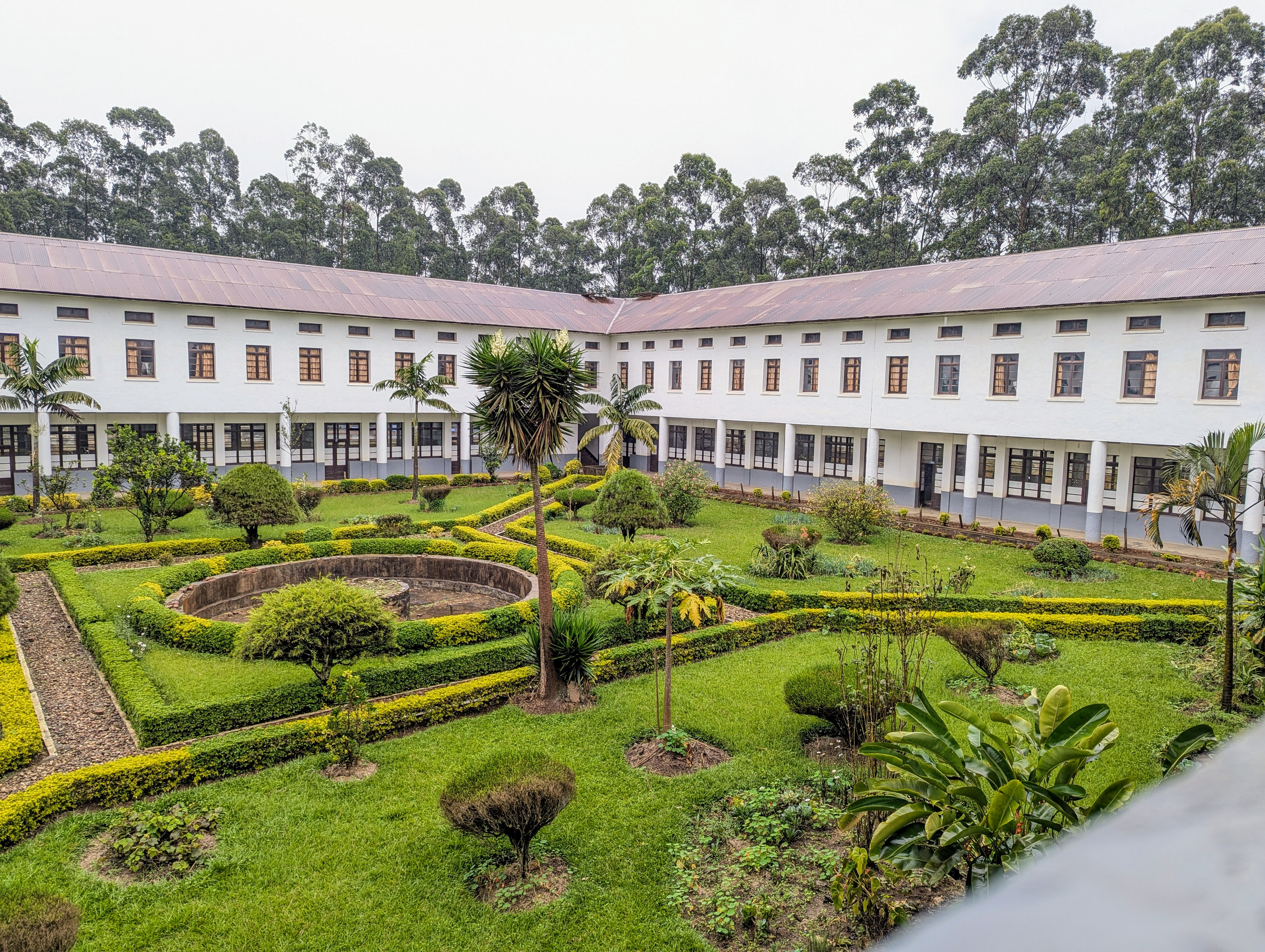

- Kambali Institute (formerly Pie-X)
- Agricultural and Veterinary Technical Institute (ITAV)
- Monseigneur-Kataliko Institute
- Mahamba Industrial Technical Institute
- Oriental Mage School Complex
- Vulindi Major Seminary

== Health ==
Butembo is home to several major hospitals in northeastern DRC, including:

- Katwa General Referral Hospital;
- Matanda Hospital;
- Caritas Hospital;
- Holy Family Hospital in Mukuna;
- Vuhimba Hospital;
- IRIS medical and surgical center.

== History ==
Before 1924, the village of Lusando served as the residence of the Mwami of the Bayora. It was a center dedicated to the trade of salt from Lake Katwe (Uganda), fish and "milumba", beaten bark cloth, from neighboring regions. From 1928 to 1930, the Compagnie Minière des Grands-Lacs (MGL) set up the administrative headquarters of the northern branch of its operations in Butembo, which became the transit and acclimatization center for the workforce located at road junctions. In the 1930s to 1940s, a core of Europeans composed mainly of traders and industrialists settled 1 km south of the MGL headquarters on either side of the Congo-Nile road, the current Route Nationale 2. It is the genesis of an indigenous town between Kambali hill and Ruwenzori avenue.

In the 1943 edition of Codes et Lois du Congo Belge, annotated by Léon Strouvens with Pierre Piron, the name of Butembo was already mentioned in decree no. 47 of August 19, 1937, relating to the urban districts of the province of "Costermansville", future Kivu then fragmented into North Kivu, South Kivu and Maniema. This decree recognized Butembo as a large village. Subsequently, in 1949 by Order No. 21/053 of September 23, 1949 in accordance with the provisions of Ordinance-Law No. 170/AIMO of July 20, 1945 establishing indigenous cities, Butembo was recognized as an indigenous city.

From 1950 to 1959, Butembo then reached the Avenue des écoles, the Congo ya Sika district with respectively 9,653 inhabitants in 1957 and 11,189 inhabitants in 1959. The year 1958 marked the signing of Ordinance No. 97/138 of the May 15, 1956 subjecting Butembo to the regime of the decree of February 21, 1949 relating to town planning. Butembo is therefore recognized as an extra-customary center by Decree No. 221/180 of September 12, 1958. The following decade, the city extended to Goma Avenue, the Vungi cell, Kimemi, Londo, Muhayirwa and Vihya. With a population of 26,065 inhabitants. In 1962, a law was passed by the assembly of Kivu-Maniema to elevate Butembo to the rank of commune. In 1963, Butembo became the capital of the Lake Edward district. In 1965 was the transfer of the bishopric of the diocese of Beni to Butembo. Repeal of the status of urban commune enjoyed by Butembo following the abolition of the province of North Kivu and the District of Lake Edward in 1967. Butembo was still governed according to the local community system until 1970.

Butembo will then be recognized as a city among the cities created by presidential decrees. The years 1970 to 1979, the city of Butembo is composed of 6 districts named Kambali, Matanda, Vungi, Lumumba, Congo ya Sika and President of the Republic. Later it expands east to Kitulu, Kisingiri, south to Kalimbute, Vutetse, Vulumbi, Vulema and Vuhika. The population then numbered 50,921 in 1975 and 69,227 in 1979. In 1980, Butembo became the residence of a sub-regional deputy commissioner, from where he supervised the administration of the Beni and Lubero zones between 1980 and 1985 In 1987: Butembo is registered on the list of 83 cities recognized and/or created in Zaire by presidential decrees n° 87/231 to 87/238 of 29/6/1987. Around the year 1987 when Butembo had 92,932 inhabitants and the period of the 1990s, a neighboring agglomeration, that of Makerere in the chiefdom-community of Bashu developed while in the chiefdom of Baswagha, the localities of Vohakatwa, Mukuna, Ivatama, Malera, Rughenda, Katsya and Vutsundo are experiencing remarkable population growth, bringing the population to 141,707.

In 1988: Opening of the Catholic University of Graben in Butembo with faculties of human and veterinary medicine, agronomy and economics. In 1993: Inauguration of the first private satellite telecommunications station PATELSAT (telephone, television, fax, etc.).

In 1999: The city of Butembo was granted city status by decree n° 01/001 bis/CAB/GP-MK/99 of September 29, 1999, creating the cities of Beni and Butembo in the provinces of North Kivu, by the rebel authorities of the RCD/K-ML who had chosen Beni as the seat of their political institution during the second so-called war of liberation which broke out on 2 August 1999, in the DRC.

In 2001: The president of the RCD/K-ML the Antipas Mbusa Nyamwisi, son of the region, signed decree No. 2001/038 on December 22 on the creation and delimitation of the city of Butembo and its municipalities in the province of North Kivu.

The President of the Republic Joseph Kabila signed Decree No. 042/2003 of March 28, 2003 recognizing Butembo as a city and setting its boundaries. According to this evolution, it can be seen that Butembo has escaped the application of the planning decrees of 1949 and 1957, which affects its urban fabric.

== Ebola ==
Ebola broke out in August 2018 in North Kivu province. A series of attacks on Ebola treatment centers in Butembo led up to the death of a policeman in March 2019 and of a doctor in April 2019. Locals mistakenly believe aid workers brought the virus to the area. More than 102,000 people received an experimental vaccine in this period, but 843 of 1300 confirmed and probable Ebola patients died. Treatment centers were earlier torched in Butembo and Katwa, and medical professionals threatened to strike.

== Climate ==
Climate data for Butembo, elevation 1,840 m (6,040 ft), (1971–2000)
Month	Jan	Feb	Mar	Apr	May	Jun	Jul	Aug	Sep	Oct	Nov	Dec	Year
Mean daily maximum °C (°F)	24.5 (76.1)	24.9 (76.8)	24.9 (76.8)	24.3 (75.7)	24.3 (75.7)	23.8 (74.8)	23.2 (73.8)	23.0 (73.4)	23.5 (74.3)	23.6 (74.5)	23.9 (75.0)	23.6 (74.5)	24.0 (75.1)
Mean daily minimum °C (°F)	9.6 (49.3)	10.0 (50.0)	11.0 (51.8)	11.8 (53.2)	12.1 (53.8)	11.5 (52.7)	11.2 (52.2)	12.0 (53.6)	11.9 (53.4)	11.7 (53.1)	11.1 (52.0)	11.3 (52.3)	11.3 (52.3)
Average precipitation mm (inches)	68.0 (2.68)	94.0 (3.70)	168.0 (6.61)	137.0 (5.39)	110.0 (4.33)	90.0 (3.54)	104.0 (4.09)	166.0 (6.54)	201.0 (7.91)	186.0 (7.32)	134.0 (5.28)	96.0 (3.78)	1,554 (61.17)
Average relative humidity (%)	80	79	82	82	82	82	85	84	85	84	83	84	83
Source: FAO
