= Lubunga =

- Commune
- Location in Democratic Republic of the Congo
- Country: DR Congo
- Province: Tshopo
- City: Kisangani

Lubunga is a commune in the south of the city of Kisangani, the capital of Tshopo province, in the Democratic Republic of Congo. It was known as the Belgian commune II at the time of the Belgian Congo. It is the only commune in the city sited on the left bank of the Congo River.

It houses, in particular, an ONATRA fluvial port and the SNCC station for trains from Ubundu.
