= Wango, Democratic Republic of the Congo =

Wango
- Commune
- Country: DR Congo
- Province: Sud-Ubangi
- City: Zongo

Wango is a commune in the city of Zongo in the Democratic Republic of Congo.
