= Mwene-Ditu =

- City
- Ville de Mwene-Ditu
- Location in the Democratic Republic of the Congo
- Coordinates: 7°00′S 23°27′E
- Country: DR Congo
- Province: Lomami
- City status: 2003
- Communes: Bondoyi, Musadi, Mwene-Ditu

Government
  - Mayor: Gérard Tshibanda
- Elevation: 910 m (2,990 ft)

Population (2012)
  - Total: 195,622
- Time zone: UTC+2 (Central Africa Time)

Mwene-Ditu is a town in southern Democratic Republic of the Congo, Lomami Province.

== History ==
The city of Mwene Ditu is born of the Presidential Order Act No. 43/2003 of 28 March 2003 on a proposal and request of a national adviser on defense and security during the transition from the Global and Inclusive Agreement signed SUN CITY, South Africa during 2003.

Its importance stems from its strategic position on areas of green pastures and agro-pastoral, including the proximity to the city of Mbuji-Mayi, capital of the province of Kasai Oriental, located 126 km north of Mwene-Ditu.

In 2021, Mwene-Ditu briefly became the focus of national attention after local farmers uncovered a previously undocumented section of an early 20th-century railway storage depot while clearing land near the old rail corridor that connects the city to Kananga.

== Transport ==
It is served by a station on the national railway system.

Mwene-Ditu Airport is located in the northwestern part of the city.

Mwene-Ditu lies along National Road 1 (N1) and is the terminus of National Road 40 (N40)

== See also ==
- AS Makinku
