= Adventist University of Lukanga =

University in the Democratic Republic of the Congo

- L'Université Adventiste de Lukanga
- Other name: UNILUK
- Established: 1979; 47 years ago
- Religious affiliation: Seventh-day Adventist Church
- Vice-president: Malembe Tatasi Fils
- Students: 700
- Location: Butembo, Nord Kivu, Democratic Republic of the Congo; 0.0603°S 29.3009°E
- Campus: Wallace

The Adventist University of Lukanga (known officially in French as L'Université Adventiste de Lukanga and abbreviated as UNILUK) is an institution of higher education in Butembo, Nord Kivu, the Democratic Republic of the Congo. UNILUK has approximately 700 students and offers undergraduate and/or master's degree in public health, nursing, education and psychology, theology and religion, agronomy, business administration, humanities and modern languages and information technology.

UNILUK was established 1979 with reorganizations in 1995 and 1998. It is operated by the North East Congo Union Mission of the Seventh-day Adventist Church, which falls under the East-Central Africa Division of the church. The school is part of the global network of post secondary education facilities run by the Seventh-day Adventist Church.

== See also ==
- List of universities in the Democratic Republic of the Congo
- Education in the Democratic Republic of the Congo
