= Gbadolite (commune) =

- Commune
- Location in Democratic Republic of the Congo
- Coordinates: 4°18′N 21°00′E
- Country: DR Congo
- Province: Nord-Ubangi
- City: Gbadolite

Gbadolite is a commune of the city of Gbadolite, the capital of Nord-Ubangi province, Democratic Republic of Congo. It is located in the rainforest, about a dozen kilometers south of the banks of the Ubangi River. Gbado, as it is sometimes called, covers 11.2 km ^{2}. This is one of three communes of the city of Gbadolite.
