= Ibanda, South Kivu =

Ibanda
- Commune
- Country: DR Congo
- Province: South Kivu
- City: Bukavu

Ibanda is a commune in Bukavu, South Kivu, Democratic Republic of the Congo. It corresponds to the city center. It is bounded on the north by Lake Kivu and on the east by Rwanda.
