= Kampemba =

Commune in the Democratic Republic of the Congo

Coordinates: 10°57′54″S 26°43′54″E

Kampemba is a commune of the city of Lubumbashi in the Democratic Republic of the Congo.
