= Mwene-Ditu (commune) =

Coordinates: 7.000000°S 23.450000°E

Mwene-Ditu is a commune of the city of Mwene-Ditu in the Democratic Republic of the Congo.
