= Vulamba =

Vulamba is a commune of the city of Butembo in North Kivu, Democratic Republic of the Congo.
