= Mulekera =

Commune of Beni in North Kivu, the Congo

Mulekera or Muhekera is a commune of the city of Beni in North Kivu, Democratic Republic of the Congo.
