= Bungulu =

Commune of Beni in North Kivu, the Congo

Bungulu is a commune of the city of Beni in North Kivu, Democratic Republic of the Congo.
