= Musadi =

Commune of the city of Mwene-Ditu in the Democratic Republic of the Congo

Musadi is a commune of the city of Mwene-Ditu in the Lomami Province in the Democratic Republic of the Congo. More than a thousand residents fled in 2017 after militias entered the commune during the Kamwina Nsapu rebellion.
