= Kamalondo =

Commune in the city of Lubumbashi in the Democratic Republic of the Congo

Coordinates: 11°41′01″S 27°29′09″E

Kamalondo is a commune of the city of Lubumbashi in the Democratic Republic of the Congo. It is located in the Haut-Katanga Province.
