= Katuba =

Commune of Lubumbashi, Democratic Republic of the Congo

Coordinates: 11°42′42″S 27°27′18″E

Katuba is a commune of the city of Lubumbashi in the Democratic Republic of the Congo.
