= Serena Hotels =

Hospitality company

- Type: Public
- Traded as: KN: TPSE
- Industry: Hospitality, Tourism
- Founded: 1970s in Kenya
- Headquarters: Nairobi, Kenya
- Products: Hotels, lodges, and resorts
- Owner: Tourism Promotion Services Ltd
- Number of employees: 1,969
- Website: serenahotels.com

Tourism Promotion Services (TPS), doing business as Serena Hotels, is a Kenyan hotel chain that operates hotels in East Africa, Southern Africa, Central Asia, and South Asia. It is based in Nairobi.

TPS is listed on the Nairobi Stock Exchange (NSE) and is a subsidiary of the Aga Khan Fund for Economic Development (AKFED).

As of 2024, Serena comprises a collection of 35 hotels, luxury resorts, and safari lodges which are located in East Africa (Democratic Republic of the Congo, Kenya, Tanzania, Rwanda, Uganda, and Mozambique) and Central and South Asia (Pakistan and Tajikistan).

For many years, Serena Hotels was the only international hotel chain that operated in Afghanistan. On 1 February 2025, after nearly two decades of operating, Serena Hotels handed over the Kabul Serena Hotel in Kabul to the Taliban government-owned Hotel State Owned Corporation, which renamed it the Kabul Grand Hotel.

== Properties ==
| # | Hotel Name | Hotel Location | Country |
|---|---|---|---|
| 1 | Amboseli Serena Safari Lodge | Amboseli National Park | Kenya |
| 2 | Arusha Serena Hotel | Arusha | Tanzania |
| 3 | Dar es Salaam Serena Hotel | Dar es Salaam | Tanzania |
| 4 | Dushanbe Serena Hotel | Dushanbe | Tajikistan |
| 5 | Faisalabad Serena Hotel | Faisalabad | Pakistan |
| 6 | Gilgit Serena Hotel | Gilgit | Pakistan |
| 7 | Goma Serena Hotel | Goma | Democratic Republic of the Congo |
| 8 | Hunza Serena Hotel | Karimabad | Pakistan |
| 9 | Islamabad Serena Hotel | Islamabad | Pakistan |
| 10 | Kampala Serena Hotel | Kampala | Uganda |
| 11 | Kigali Serena Hotel | Kigali | Rwanda |
| 12 | Kilaguni Serena Safari Lodge | Tsavo West National Park | Kenya |
| 13 | Kirawira Serena Camp | Serengeti National Park | Tanzania |
| 14 | Lake Elmenteita Serena Camp | Soysambu Conservancy | Kenya |
| 15 | Lake Kivu Serena Hotel | Gisenyi | Rwanda |
| 16 | Lake Manyara Serena Safari Lodge | Mto wa Mbu | Tanzania |
| 17 | Lake Victoria Serena Golf Resort & Spa | Wakiso | Uganda |
| 18 | Mara Serena Safari Lodge | Mara Triangle | Kenya |
| 19 | Mbuzi Mawe Serena Camp | Serengeti National Park | Tanzania |
| 20 | Nairobi Serena Hotel | Nairobi | Kenya |
| 21 | Ngorongoro Serena Safari Lodge | Ngorongoro Conservation Area | Tanzania |
| 22 | Peshawar Serena Hotel | Peshawar | Pakistan |
| 23 | Polana Serena Hotel | Maputo | Mozambique |
| 24 | Quetta Serena Hotel | Quetta | Pakistan |
| 25 | Serena Altit Fort Residence | Karimabad | Pakistan |
| 26 | Serena Beach Resort & Spa | Mombasa | Kenya |
| 27 | Serena Khaplu Palace | Khaplu | Pakistan |
| 28 | Serena Mivumo River Lodge | Nyerere National Park | Tanzania |
| 29 | Serena Shigar Fort | Shigar | Pakistan |
| 30 | Serengeti Serena Safari Lodge | Serengeti National Park | Tanzania |
| 31 | Sost Serena Hotel | Sust | Pakistan |
| 32 | Sweetwaters Serena Camp | Ol Pejeta Conservancy | Kenya |
| 33 | Zanzibar Serena Hotel | Zanzibar City | Tanzania |

== See also ==
- Aga Khan Development Network
