= Ruwenzori (commune) =

Commune of Beni in North Kivu, the Congo

Ruwenzori is a commune of the city of Beni in North Kivu, Democratic Republic of the Congo.
