= Beni, Democratic Republic of the Congo =

Beni
- City
- Ville de Beni
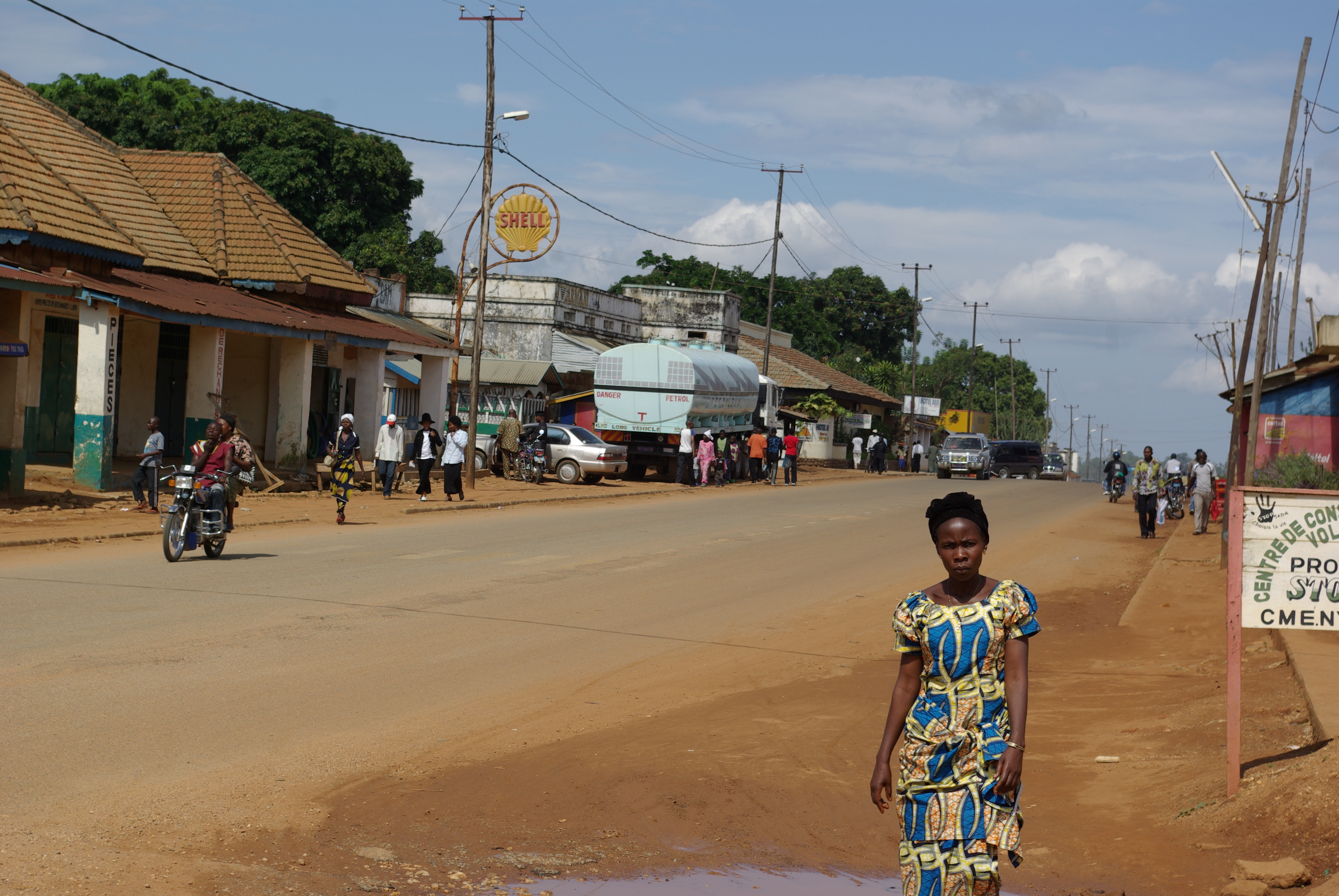
- National Road No. 2 is the main road in Beni
- Interactive map of Beni
- Location in Democratic Republic of the Congo
- Coordinates: 0°30′N 29°28′E
- Country: Democratic Republic of the Congo
- Province: North Kivu

Government
  - Mayor: Nyonyi Bwanakawa Masumbuko

Population (2013)
  - Total: 231,952
- Time zone: UTC+2 (Central Africa Time)
- Climate: Af

Beni is a city in north eastern Democratic Republic of the Congo, lying immediately west of the Virunga National Park and the Rwenzori Mountains, on the edge of the Ituri Forest.

== Overview ==
Beni is home to a market, an airport and the Christian Bilingual University of Congo (UCBC). As of 2013 it had an estimated population of 231,952. Beni contains four communes, or municipalities: Beni, Bungulu, Ruwenzori and Mulekera.

== History ==
The town was the scene of fierce fighting in the Second Congo War around 2001. Beni also has many MONUC bases; elements of the Indian-led North Kivu Brigade are based in the town.

Between October 2014 and May 2016 over 500 people died in a series of attacks on Beni and its surrounding area that have been attributed to Ugandan Islamist rebels. The Beni massacre occurred here in August 2016.

As of December 2018 Beni has been subject to over 200 cases of Ebola virus disease (EVD) according to the World Health Organization. Beni is near Mangina, the epicenter of the 2018–19 Kivu Ebola outbreak.

On the third of June 2019 an attack in the city killed or wounded 25 people. ISIL claimed responsibility shortly afterwards.

In 2020, Allied Democratic Forces (ADF) rebels reportedly orchestrated a prison escape from the Kangbayi prison, and they killed and in many cases beheaded 25 people in the village of Tingwe. The rebels have been accused of 800 deaths.

In 2023, the Makugwe massacre happened in a nearby village. Beni became the temporary provincial capital of North Kivu following the capture of Goma in 2025 by the March 23 Movement.

The 2026 Ebola epidemic struck Beni on 29 May 2026, when confirmed cases were reported in the city, which was an epicentre of the Kivu Ebola epidemic.
