= Karisimbi (commune) =

Commune in Goma, North Kivu

Coordinates: 1.63333°S 29.18333°E

- Commune
- Commune de Karisimbi
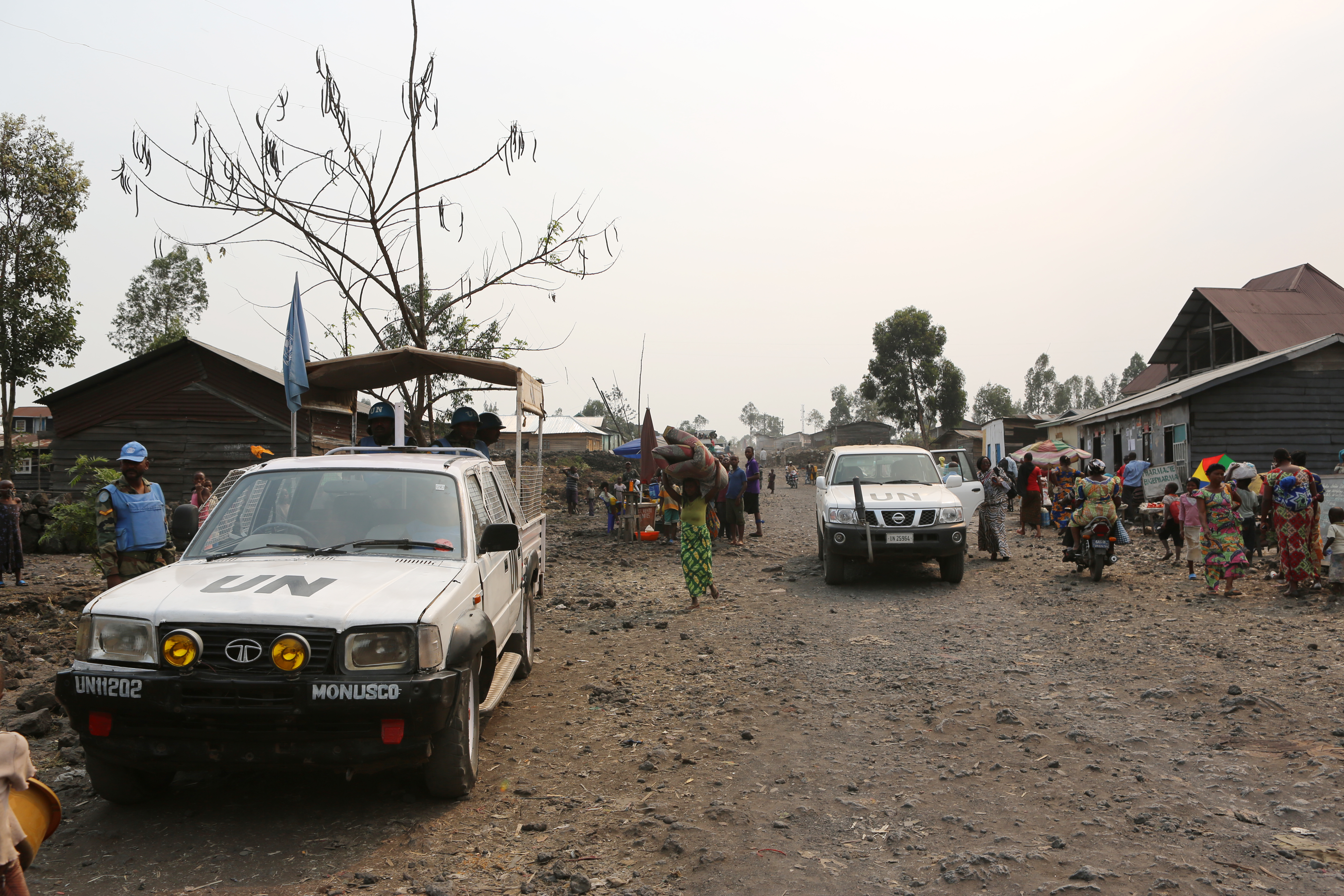
- Interactive map of Karisimbi
- Country: DR Congo
- Province: North Kivu
- City: Goma
- Official language: French
- National language: Kiswahili

Karisimbi is a commune in Goma in the North Kivu Province of the eastern region of the Democratic Republic of the Congo. The commune takes its name from the nearby Mount Karisimbi, a prominent volcano in the Virunga Mountains. Spanning an area of approximately 33,372 square kilometers, Karisimbi extends from Goma International Airport to the outskirts of the Mugunga neighborhood. It is bordered by the Masisi Territory to the south and Rwanda to the east.

Primarily a residential area, Karisimbi hosts limited commercial activity and a structured administrative division. The commune is organized into 11 neighborhoods—Murara, Ndosho, Virunga, Bujovu, Mugunga, Kasika, Mabanga Nord, Mabanga Sud, Majengo, Kahembe, and Katoyi—which are further subdivided into 39 cells and 209 avenues.

== Administrative subdivision ==
Legally, both the city and commune function as decentralized administrative entities endowed with juridical personality, whereas the neighborhoods are merely administrative entities devoid of representation or legal personality (referenced in Article 82-006). Furthermore, each neighborhood is subdivided into smaller entities known as avenues, cells (cellules), and nyumba kumi (a cluster of ten houses overseen by an appointee designated by the neighborhood chief).

The commune is administratively segmented into 11 distinct neighborhoods:

1. Ndosho: Formerly encompassed by the Keshero neighborhood, Ndosho occupies a hill and derives its name from the term "round stone" found between the villages Kyeshero and Bugamba. These villages amalgamated to form the Ndosho locality, extending from the Mudja groupement within the neighboring Bukumu Chiefdom. Presidential Decree No. 89-127 of 22 May 1989, redefined Goma's neighborhoods, transforming this locality into the Ndosho neighborhood. It is geographically delimited to the north by the Mudja groupement, to the south by the Goma-Sake Road and the Keshero neighborhood, to the east by Katoyi, and to the west by the Mugunga neighborhood. Ndosho comprises seven cells and 31 avenues.
2. Mugunga: Situated at Goma's threshold when approaching from the Masisi Territory and South Kivu Province, Mugunga is bordered by Rusayo to the north, Lac Vert to the south, Ndosho to the east, and Virunga National Park to the west. It is subdivided into six cells and 20 avenues.
3. Virunga: Formerly referred to as "Brazza", Virunga was one of the original four neighborhoods constituting the former city of Goma. Decree No. 89-127 officially established its boundaries on 22 May 1989. Bordered by Majengo to the north, Murara to the south, Bujovu and Goma International Airport to the east, and Mabanga-Nord to the west, Virunga is subdivided into four cells and 21 avenues.
4. Murara: Known colloquially as the "Office neighborhood" due to the presence of homes constructed for state officers during the Belgian colonial period, Murara is bounded to the north by the CBCA Virunga General Hospital street, to the south by the Goma-Sake Road and Les Volcans neighborhood, to the east by Goma International Airport, and to the west by Denis Road. Notable landmarks such as the Paluku and Instigo-two lamps road, now referred to as "Un kilomètre témoin", demarcate its division from Mabanga-Nord and Mabanga-Sud. It is subdivided into four cells and 34 avenues.
5. Majengo: Majengo was formally recognized under Presidential Order No. 029/127 on 22 May 1983. It is bordered to the north by the Munigi groupement of the Bukumu Chiefdom, to the south by Virunga and Mabanga-Nord, to the east by Bujovu and Goma International Airport, and to the west by the Kasika and Katoyi neighborhoods. Majengo is partitioned into five cells and 23 avenues.
6. Katoyi: This decentralized administrative entity was formed by Ordinance Law No. 89 on 27 July 1989, and restructured by Order No. 01/103/CAB/GP-NK on 14 July 2000. Katoyi is bounded to the north by the Ngangi II village, to the south by Himbi, to the east by Kasika, and to the west by Ndosho. It is subdivided into four cells and 25 avenues.
7. Kasika: Created by decree No. 1/035/CAB/GP-NK/98 on 11 November 1998, Kasika is bordered by Majengo to the north, Goma-Sake Road to the south, Mabanga-Nord and Mabanga-Sud neighborhoods and the Katindo military camp to the east, and Katoyi to the west. It consists of three cells and 36 avenues.
8. Mabanga Sud: This neighborhood originated from Presidential Order No. 089/197 on 25 May 1989, which outlined Goma's territorial and administrative division. It was later bifurcated into Mabanga-Nord and Mabanga-Sud under a gubernatorial decree. Mabanga-Sud comprises three cells and 17 avenues.
9. Mabanga Nord: Bordered by Majengo to the north, Mabanga-Sud to the south, Virunga to the east, and Kasika and Katoyi to the west, Mabanga-Nord is subdivided into two cells and eight avenues.
10. Kahembe: The Kahembe neighborhood is bordered by the ITIG cemetery to the north, Rue de la Petite Birere Avenue Mont Hoyo to the south, the neutral zone to the east, and Ep Keshero to the west. It is subdivided into five cells and 13 avenues.
11. Bujovu: Originally the Tyazo sub-district within Virunga neighborhood, Bujovu became an independent neighborhood through Ministerial Decree No. 01/037/CAB/GP-NK/98 on 18 November 1989. It is bordered by the Bukumu Chiefdom to the north, Kahembe to the south, the Republic of Rwanda to the east, and Goma International Airport to the west. Bujovu comprises three cells and 13 avenues.
