= Kikwit =

City in Kwilu, DR Congo

- City
- Ville de Kikwit
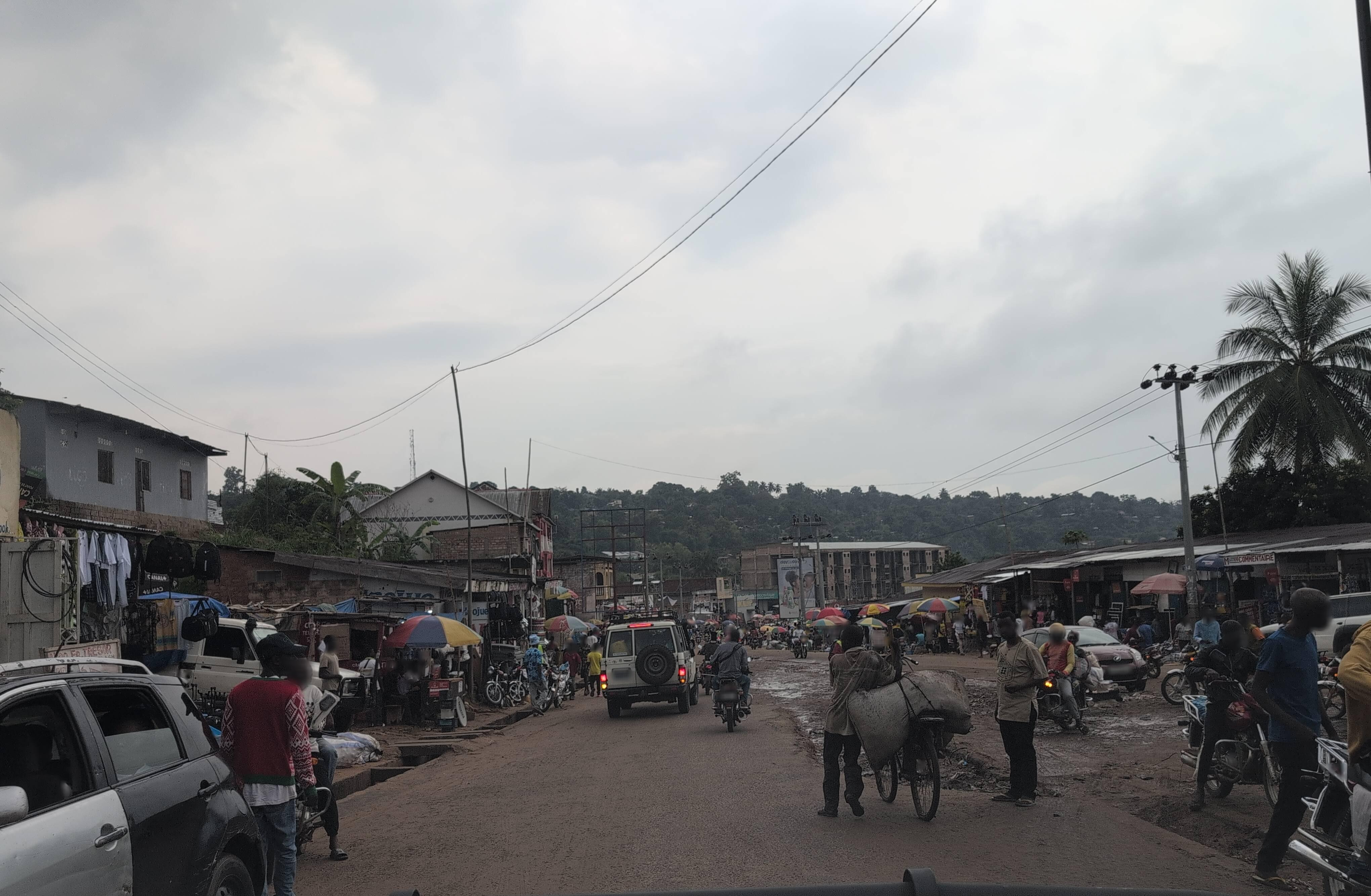
- Kikwit city centre in 2025

- Location in Democratic Republic of the Congo
- Coordinates: 5°02′19″S 18°49′05″E
- Country: DR Congo
- Province: Kwilu Province
- City status: 1970
- Communes: Kazamba, Lukemi, Lukolela, Nzinda

Government
  - Mayor: Abe Ngiama (as of 2026)

Area
  - Total: 92 km^{2} (36 sq mi)
- Elevation: 470 m (1,540 ft)

Population
  - Estimate (2020): 1,336,992
- (official estimate) (Note: Population estimates include 1,336,992 (2020), 800,000 (2022), 500,000 (2023), and 1,200,000 (2023).)
- Demonym: Kikwitois
- Time zone: UTC+1 (WAT)
- Climate: Aw

Kikwit (Note: Pronounced /ˈkiːkwiːt/, KEE-kweet) is the largest city in Kwilu Province, in the southwest of the Democratic Republic of the Congo. Located at the furthest navigable point of the Kwilu River, the urban area of Kikwit is primarily on the river's left bank. With over half a million inhabitants, Kikwit is a secondary city of the country. It is divided into four communes: Kazamba, Lukemi, Lukolela, and Nzinda.

Originating as a small village, Kikwit was developed by Belgian colonists in the late 19th century and became a centre of ivory and rubber trade. After the establishment of the Belgian Congo, Kikwit was granted to the company Huileries du Congo Belge, which established palm oil plantations in the 1910s and 1920s. Kikwit became an administrative centre and the largest producer of palm oil in the Kwilu region. Beginning in 1959, Kikwit was a centre of political activities of the Parti Solidaire Africain. The city was impacted by the Kwilu rebellion of the 1960s, but the city centre was not a conflict zone. Kikwit's economy and infrastructure declined by the 1990s. In 1995, the city saw an outbreak of the deadly Ebola virus.

Kikwit's population includes members of the Pende and Mbala ethnic groups, and the Kongo language is widely spoken. The city has thousands of migrants, including workers from rural areas. About 60% of the population is Catholic, and the city is the headquarters of the Catholic Diocese of Kikwit. Economic activities include agriculture, commercial transport, and informal enterprises. The city has high rates of poverty and of youth unemployment, which contribute to criminal activity, including by Kuluna gangs. The city has poor infrastructure, lacking a municipal water supply system or electrical grid. Kikwit is served by a single highway, National Road 1, as well as Kikwit Airport.

== History ==
=== Colonial development ===
Kikwit was a small village prior to Belgian colonisation. Belgian colonists developed the town with the goal of exploiting plant and mineral resources in the region. Its location at the furthest navigable point of the Kwilu River made it a useful port. Kikwit became a regional centre of the ivory and rubber industries in the late 19th century, under the leadership of the Société anonyme belge pour le commerce du Haut-Congo, a private company. The town received services and infrastructure such as a paved highway and electricity.

The Belgian Congo government was established in 1908 and began making deals with private companies, granting an extensive concession to the Huileries du Congo Belge (HCB). The company received exclusive rights over palm oil farming on this land, which included Kikwit and nearby Leverville (modern-day Lusanga). Palm oil plantations were established around the town in the 1910s and 1920s. The transport of palm oil for export contributed to the development of Kikwit's trade and warehousing activities. In 1912, the town was a centre for the treatment of sleeping sickness.

Religious organisations entered Kikwit as its location enabled missionary expeditions to the interior. The Catholic Church began operating in Kikwit in 1912, when Jesuit missionaries from Belgium established the Sacre-Cœur mission—originally part of the Apostolic Prefecture of Kwango—at a location selected by Prefect Stanislas De Vos. (Note: In addition to the Jesuits, Kikwit would receive Catholic missionaries of the Sœurs de la charité de Namur in 1922, the Sœurs de Sainte-Marie de Namur in 1947, the Soeurs de Saint André de Tournai in 1951, the Suore delle Poverelle di Bergamo in 1952, and the Annonciades in 1966, as well as a local congregation, the Sœurs de Marie au Kwango, in 1937.) Missionaries had travelled eastward from Léopoldville (modern-day Kinshasa), with the goal of increasing the church's presence in the Congo and competing with Protestant presence. Protestant groups were less active than Catholics in the colonial Kwilu region, though the Baptist Mid-Missions established a seminary in Kikwit. A Mennonite mission was also founded near Kikwit in the 1920s by Aaron Janzen, a missionary of the Congo Inland Mission. Religious organisations would become major contributors to education and healthcare in Kikwit.

As a result of the HCB's growth, Kikwit grew as an administrative centre. It first became a district capital in 1935, replacing Banningville (modern-day Bandundu). The town was racially segregated into the cité européenne (European city) and the cité indigène (indigenous city). The Office d'Exploitation des Transports Coloniaux conducted steamboat trips between Kikwit and Léopoldville approximately weekly by 1939. The trip took five days downstream to Léopoldville and ten days in the opposite direction.

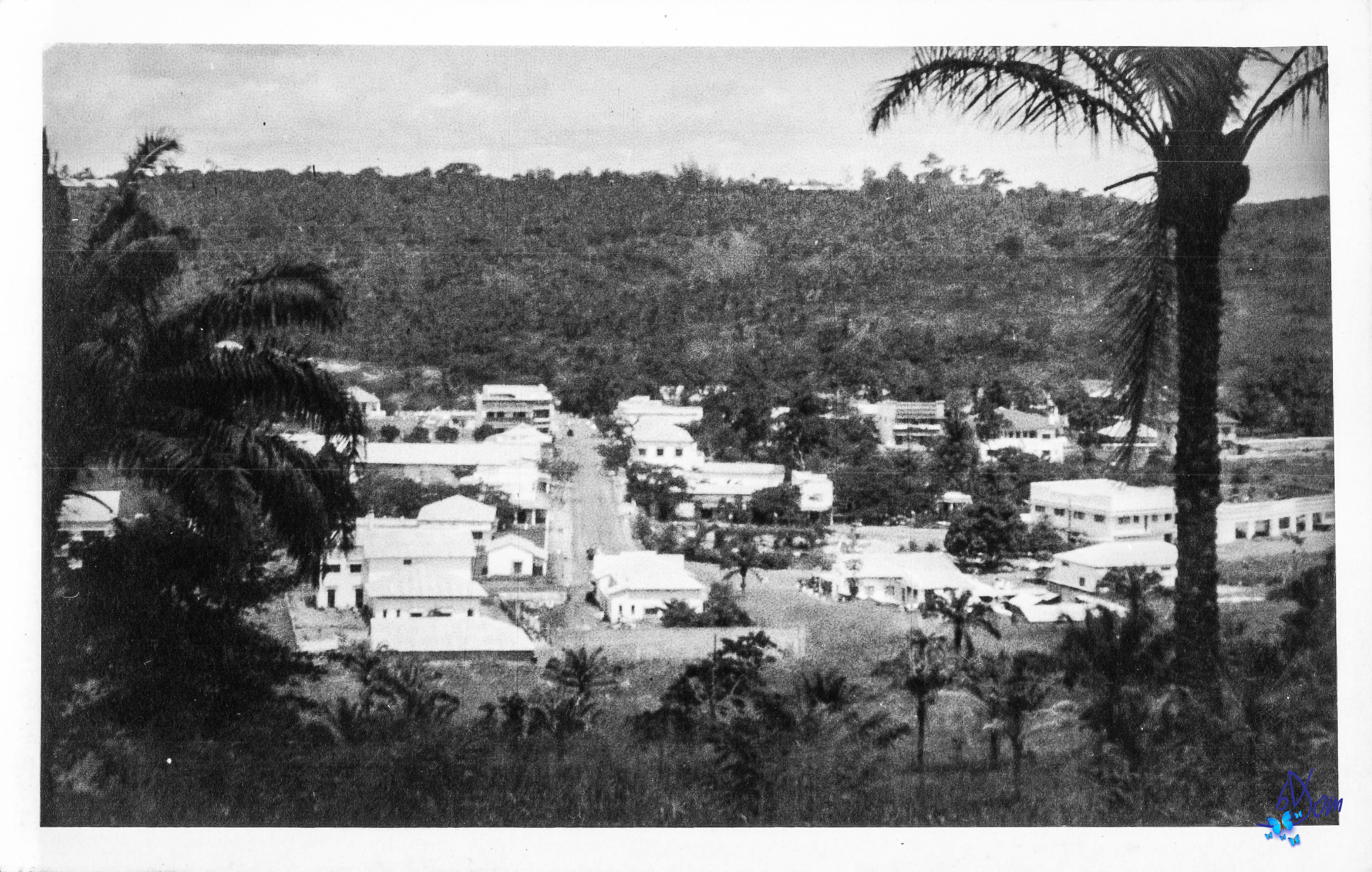
Kikwit in the 1950s

Kikwit was a small town, but it was important to the Kwilu region as a port and administrative centre, as its location on a river in a densely populated part of the region was useful for establishing administrative and military control and communications. It served as the capital of Kwilu District until 1954. Kikwit was the region's leading producer of palm oil, producing 27,483 tons in 1956, and many workers came to the town from nearby Gungu and Idiofa.

A faction of the Kimbanguist religious movement called Dieudonné was founded in Kikwit in 1954 by the eponymous religion scholar, Dieudonné. It was popular in the area until being banned in 1956. Another form of Kimbanguism, the Nzambi-Malembe movement, came to Kikwit in 1956.

=== Independence era ===
The first political party to operate in Kikwit was the Congolese National Movement, when a local organisation was established by Charles de Booth in March 1959. (Note: Another attempt to establish MNC presence was led by labour unionist Placide Penge.) The organisation was short-lived as Kikwitois people did not support de Booth, who was not indigenous and was associated with the Jesuit elite. De Booth led Kikwit's delegation to the Luluabourg Conference of May 1959, which decided to instead represent the Parti Solidaire Africain (PSA). This solidified the importance of the party, which extended its presence in the Kwilu region, gaining the support of the administration and the opposition of Catholic leaders. Although the PSA was based in Léopoldville and had another branch in Kenge, Kwango, Kikwit was the centre of the party's operations.

After the First Congolese Republic gained independence from Belgium in 1960, cities such as Kikwit began to lose financial investment. In December 1960, soldiers raided Kikwit as revenge for the killing of a soldier. This resulted in civilian deaths that strained the city's hospital. Upon the creation of Kwilu Province in 1962, Kikwit was the most densely populated part of the province, and it became the provincial capital the same year. Beginning in January 1963, Kikwit was the centre of labour strikes among plantation workers, supported by the PSA. Kikwit had a population of 44,969 in December 1963.

During the Kwilu rebellion (1963–1965), the rebel militia of Pierre Mulele took over the surrounding region. Mulele's militia expanded into Kikwit after establishing control in Gungu and Idiofa. The conflict led the city to declare a curfew on 4 September 1963. Mulele's militia launched attacks on Catholic missions, including Sacre-Cœur on 7 March 1964. It did not attack the city centre, and Kikwit was otherwise not considered a battle site. The city remained under government control during the Simba rebellion (1964–1967), and it housed many refugees from conflict zones, such as Mukedi, by mid-1965. Upon Mulele's death in October 1968, a celebration was attended by "the whole city of Kikwit", according to a journalist from Le Courrier d'Afrique.

When Kwilu was merged with other provinces to form Bandundu Province in 1966, Kikwit became its capital. However, the national government viewed the city as dissident; although it had not been the centre of Mulele's movement, it was a regional centre of population and intellectual activity. Due to this reputation, and the disfavor of a high-ranking minister, the capital was moved to Bandundu city, which was smaller and less connected than Kikwit. Kikwit lost capital status in late 1969, with all administrative functions transferred by 1970. The population briefly decreased as government employees moved to Bandundu. Kikwit gained city status on 15 March 1970, placing it under an autonomous government. According to urban scholar Deborah Louise Zubow Prindle, this was done to appease those who had wished for the capital to remain in Kikwit. In 1973, the city became its own division of the province. Officials were still appointed by the national government. Though the city was no longer a capital, it received a branch of the chamber of commerce, covering Kikwit and Idiofa.

Kikwit continued receiving European missionaries and investment, but their numbers decreased and local Catholic leaders increased by the late 1970s. The city's private-sector commerce and transport activities were dominated by foreigners until President Mobutu Sese Seko—who renamed the country to Zaire—enacted the nationalist policy of Zairianisation in the 1970s. This policy increased the role of Zairian people in the Catholic Church, and Catholic groups established enterprises and farms in Kikwit to support the community. After a 1973 decree banned anti-government newspapers, a Kongo-language local newspaper, Kimpangi (lit. 'Brotherhood')—which would later merge into Beto na Beto—was founded. By 1979, HCB—then owned by Unilever—had ten plants in Kikwit, which produced 70% of palm oil in the Kwilu region.

The paved highway between Kikwit and Kinshasa was completed in 1977 or 1979, enabling the route to be completed in 7–8 hours. This increased agricultural exports from the region around Kikwit. However, it weakened Kikwit's role as a commercial hub as national funding went primarily to the highway rather than regional roads or river transport. Nearby towns could import and export goods with Kinshasa without middlemen in Kikwit. As road transport became competitive with river transport, the city's port operated far below its capacity. In 1983, shipments by the state-affiliated Office National des Transports from Kikwit to Kinshasa were no more than 1,000 tons monthly, while private palm oil companies loaded their own shipments.

Kikwit was Zaire's eighth-largest city by 1980; the 1984 census reported its population as 160,000. It was the largest city in Bandundu Province, serving as the province's commercial and transport centre and receiving most of its infrastructure investment. The city's growth rate was declining around 1984, experiencing slower population growth than nearby market towns such as Idiofa and Bulungu, but Kikwit continued to experience rapid population growth into the 21st century. The city's education and healthcare services were mostly provided by non-governmental organisations, with 60% of schools being run by church-affiliated organisations in the 1980s.

=== Infrastructure decline ===
Kikwit's economy and infrastructure deteriorated in the late 20th century. As the smaller city of Bandundu was given preference for administrative functions, the economic importance of Kikwit declined. The national government continued to view Kikwit as dissident; it appointed pro-administration officials to positions in the city. The city's electricity and water supplies became overloaded, having relied on diesel power that had become scarce. In the 1980s, these utilities did not accept new connections, only one road was electrified, and 30% of inhabitants had water access. Education was also inadequate; in the early 1980s, six secondary schools and one primary school were shut for paperwork reasons, while no new schools opened.

After Mobutu banned Belgian organisations in 1990, the city's education and healthcare systems became dysfunctional. By 1991, the electricity and water supplies fell into disuse, and the highway was in poor condition. Kikwit was further impacted by a shift in the Congolese economy toward de-urbanisation in the 1990s. During the First Congo War, the AFDL took control of Kikwit in April 1997, shortly before the Battle of Kenge and the AFDL's victory against Mobutu.

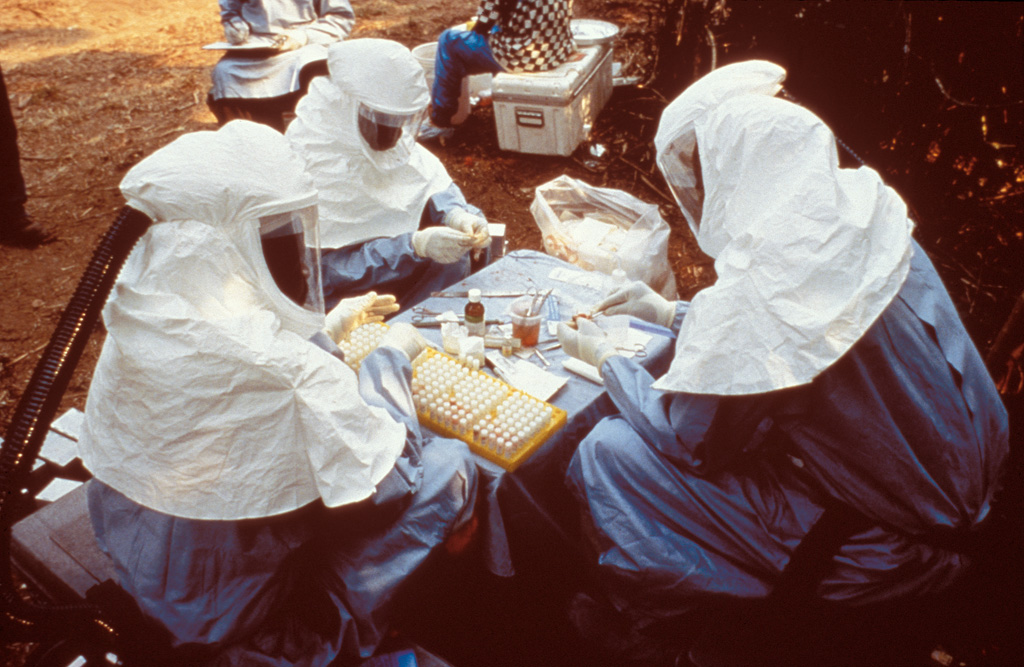
Scientists analysing the Ebola virus during the 1995 epidemic

The 1995 Kikwit Ebola outbreak was the second major outbreak of the Ebola virus. The first death was in January 1995, and the national health officials became aware of the outbreak in April. The following month, the virus was identified as Ebola and international health workers arrived at the city's general hospital while all other hospitals were ordered to close. This was one of the first instances of a hospital treating Ebola. The outbreak solidified local social support for the Catholic Church. The epidemic ended in late 1995, after causing 316 infections and 252 deaths; many were healthcare workers. The city had no local media at the time, causing uncertainty and misinformation among locals. The outbreak received wide attention from international news media and became one of the most studied epidemics. According to anthropologist Trisha Phippard, the epidemic positioned Kikwit as a centre of medicine.

Under a 1998 law, Kikwit's officials were appointed by the president of the DRC, and the mayor was subservient to the governor of Kwilu. A 2006 program of the New Partnership for Africa's Development restored 1,000 hectares of palm plantations, aiming for the industry to be controlled by local enterprises. In April 2014, a tribute concert held in Kikwit to honor King Kester Emeneya, who was born in the city, ended in a stampede, killing at least fourteen people, following the failure of a power generator. The phenomenon of gangs known as Kuluna spread to Kikwit from Kinshasa by 2015. In response, officials in Kikwit launched Operation Mbita Bango in May 2016, following an announcement by military officials. This month-long operation involved the arrest of many youths who refused to leave Kuluna gangs. At a January 2019 protest led by supporters of opposition leader Martin Fayulu, protesting his loss in the 2018 presidential election, security forces killed at least twelve protestors.

== Geography ==
Map of the Kwilu River and its main tributaries in Kikwit.

Kikwit is located in southwestern Democratic Republic of the Congo, at the coordinates 5°02'S 18°48'E, and has an area of 92 square kilometres. Kikwit is on the Kwilu River, part of the Kwango River system within the Congo Basin. It is at the river's furthest navigable point; large ships cannot travel further south due to narrow rapids. The city is in a valley where the river flows north-northwest. At Kikwit, the river has a width of 130 to 200 m (426 to 656 ft), with a water level that varies seasonally. Downstream from Kikwit to Bulungu, the river's bed is rocky, and it is joined by the Kwenge River 24 km (15 mi) downstream of the city, near Lusanga. Kikwit is 320 km (200 mi) upstream from the river's confluence at Bandundu and 690 km (430 mi) upstream from the national capital, Kinshasa. The city drains to the Lukemi and Luimi tributaries of the Kwilu, both within the city.

The elevation of Kikwit is about 470 m above sea level, with a minimum of 350 m and a maximum of 485 m. It is located on the Kwango Plateau and is mostly flat, though some areas have steep slopes. Geologically, the plateau's soil has a high clay content and consists primarily of sandstone and argillite, which cause the formation of regolith and ferralsols. Terraces of iron-heavy rocks were formed during semi-arid periods tens of thousands of years ago. The area is prone to erosion, made worse by urban expansion. The regolith and steep areas of the plateau contribute to the formation of gullies, the largest measuring 40 m deep and 60 m across. These often form parallel to roads, and countermeasures are often ineffective at preventing their formation.

Vegetation on the plateau consists of savanna and steppes, with some forested areas, while vegetation in the valley includes forested savanna, rainforest, and riparian forest. Plant coverage began degrading in the 1970s due to increased population. Contributors to deforestation include agriculture and fuel production.

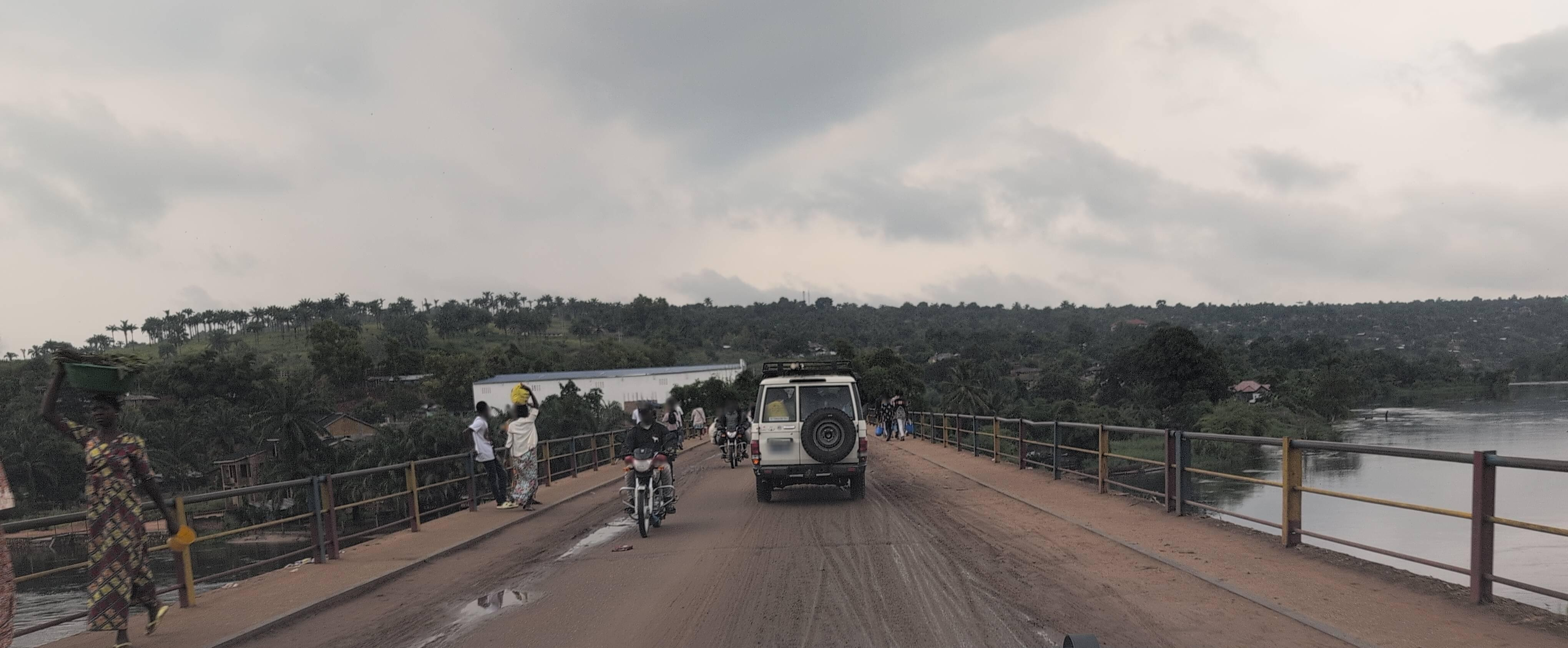
Pont Kwilu crossing the Kwilu River, toward the east bank

Kikwit's city centre is on the left bank of the Kwilu River, containing dense residential and commercial developments including the market. The right bank is rural and is connected to the left bank by only one bridge, Pont Kwilu. Older parts of the city are urban and commercial, while the urban fringe has agricultural households, cultivating fields in or near the city. Most of the city's buildings are single-story, most roads are unpaved, and plots of land are large.

=== Climate ===
Kikwit has a tropical savanna climate (Köppen climate classification Aw), with an average temperature of about 25 °C (77 °F) and average annual rainfall of 1,483 mm. The dry season lasts roughly from May to August, though it fluctuates and may last between 80 and 120 days. Rainfall peaks from October to December, with a secondary peak in March and April. In an average year, rainfall peaks at over 230 mm in October or November, and it is lowest in July, when the maximum is about 5 mm. Rainfall measurements, which began in 1955, indicate that the city has become increasingly dry following an increase in rainfall from 1963 to 1968. The city has a high humidity, with an average of 85%, which peaks during the rainiest months. The highest temperatures occur between April and May and the lowest temperatures between December and February. Daily maximum temperatures occur around 1 or 2 pm. As the city is near the equator, its atmospheric pressure is low, averaging 1,006.2 hectopascals. Winds blow most commonly from the northeast.

== Demographics ==
Population estimates of Kikwit have ranged between 500,000 and over one million in the 2020s. The municipal government reported in 2020 that the city had 1,336,992 inhabitants, including 96 foreign nationals. Despite its large size, Kikwit is considered a secondary city compared to others in the country.

Ethnic groups around Kikwit include the Pende and the Mbala. Kongo is the main language spoken in Kikwit, despite the region not being inhabited by the Kongo people. The language became a lingua franca during the colonial era. Lingala also became a common language in the city's markets by the 1990s. French is spoken in bureaucratic and medical settings.

Kikwit has thousands of rural migrants. Some families seasonally move between residences in urban Kikwit and rural areas. The city also has migrants from Kasaï Province, including those who left the declining diamond industry of Kasaï or were internally displaced by the Kamwina Nsapu rebellion of the 2010s. Refugees from Angola have also come to the city.

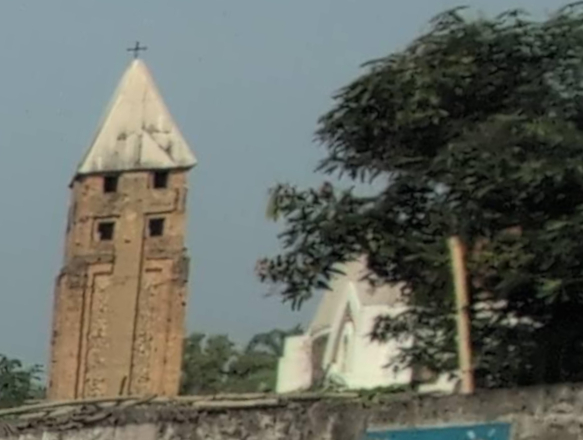
The cathedral of the Diocese of Kikwit

About 60% of Kikwit's population is Catholic, as of 2025. The city is the seat of the Diocese of Kikwit, which was established as an independent diocese in 1959. Its cathedral, built in 1950, is located in the city centre. Catholic orders that operate in Kikwit include the Jesuits, who operate the Sacre-Cœur parish and nearby Kipalu retreat; the Trappists, who operate the Mvanda monastery; and the Annonciades. Catholic organisations conduct education, healthcare, and social and community work.

== Economy and social issues ==
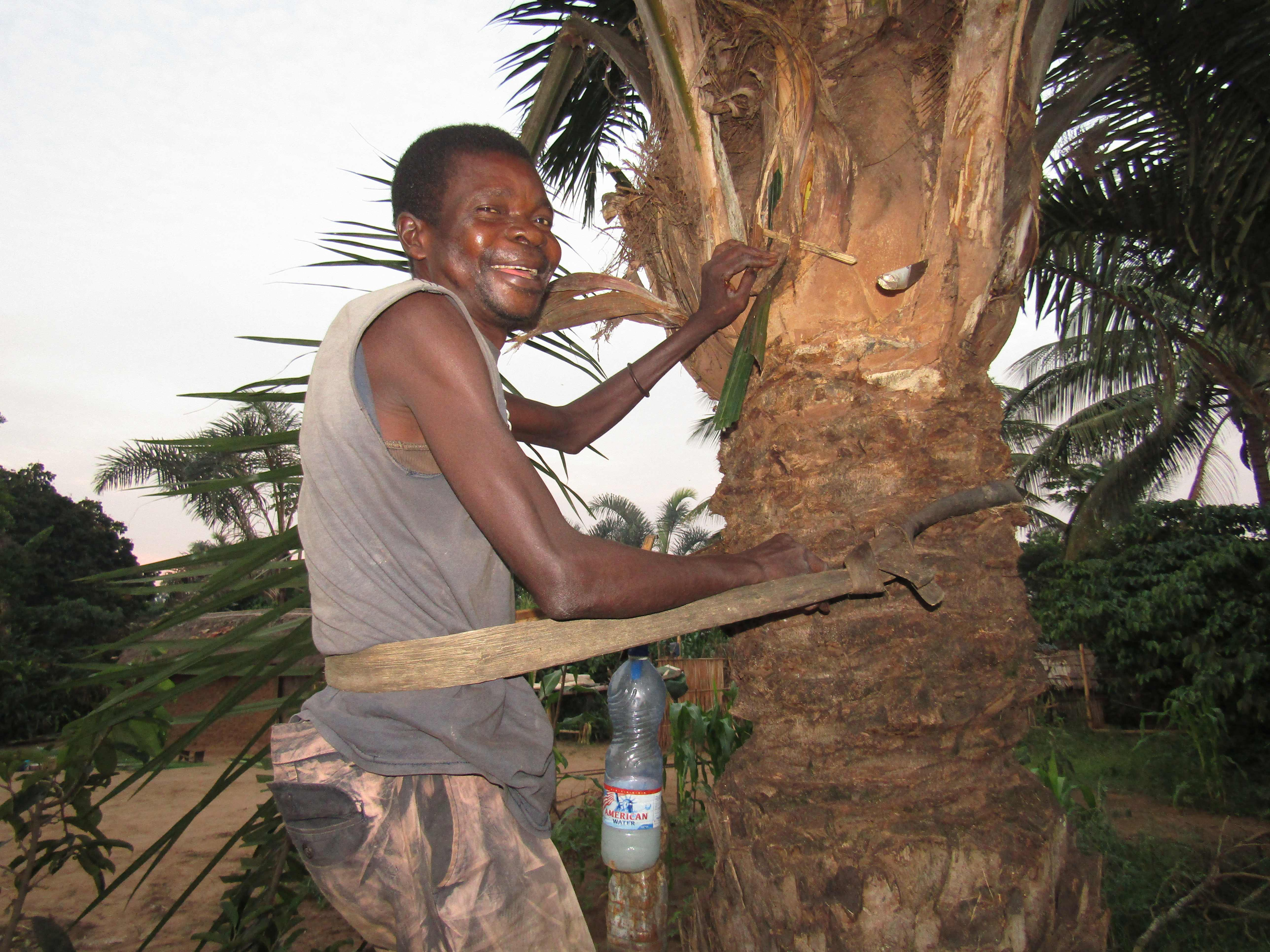
A worker climbing a palm tree

Kikwit is the main economic centre of the Kwilu region, functioning as a centre of commerce and communications, lying at a crossroads connecting areas to its east and south. The city's residents commonly describe it as a "crossroads" (carrefour) connecting the surrounding rural area to Kinshasa and beyond. The city has large-scale trucking businesses that transport products from the nearby region to places such as Kinshasa. Products from Kinshasa are sold in Kikwit by national retailers, then commonly resold in nearby settlements.

Economic activities in Kikwit include agriculture and food processing, with significant farming of crops and livestock within the city itself. Kikwit is a major supplier of cassava and maize to Kinshasa; these products are much cheaper in Kikwit than in Kinshasa due to the cost of shipping. Other exports include palm oil and nuts. Besides food processing, the city has very little industrial activity. The service sector includes urban amenities such as hotels and transport. The city also has many artisan workers, including tailors, shoe repairers, and carpenters; many undergo apprenticeships in the city, while others are trained in Kinshasa or smaller cities.

The country's diamond industry has connections to Kikwit, where Lunda and Chokwe workers are involved in the industry. International diamond smuggling has impacted the local economy; the United States dollar became a common currency by the 1990s as it was used to purchase diamonds. By the 2020s, the exchange rate between the dollar and the Congolese franc contributed to a sharp increase in prices of goods. Prior to the dominance of the diamond industry, the city was a centre of the trade of caterpillars used for wax.

Most companies in Kikwit are small and medium enterprises. As of 2019, the city has 1,926 such businesses. Most of the city's population works in the informal economy. Credit is largely provided through informal financial agreements such as likelemba.

Kikwit has a high rate of poverty. Between 1975 and 2005, housing quality and food consumption remained approximately stagnant, and uptake of technological goods increased at a lower rate than other Congolese cities, while ownership of assets increased sharply. The city also has a high youth unemployment rate, and some youths turn to crime. Kuluna gangs are active amid poor economic conditions, motivated by factors including social instability caused by high migration and a poor job market that leaves youths with unemployed parents. The city has over one hundred Kuluna groups, which are active in every neighbourhood, especially in populous neighbourhoods such as Kanzombi, Malawi, and Vevo. Kuluna are a frequent subject of media attention in the city.

== Governance ==
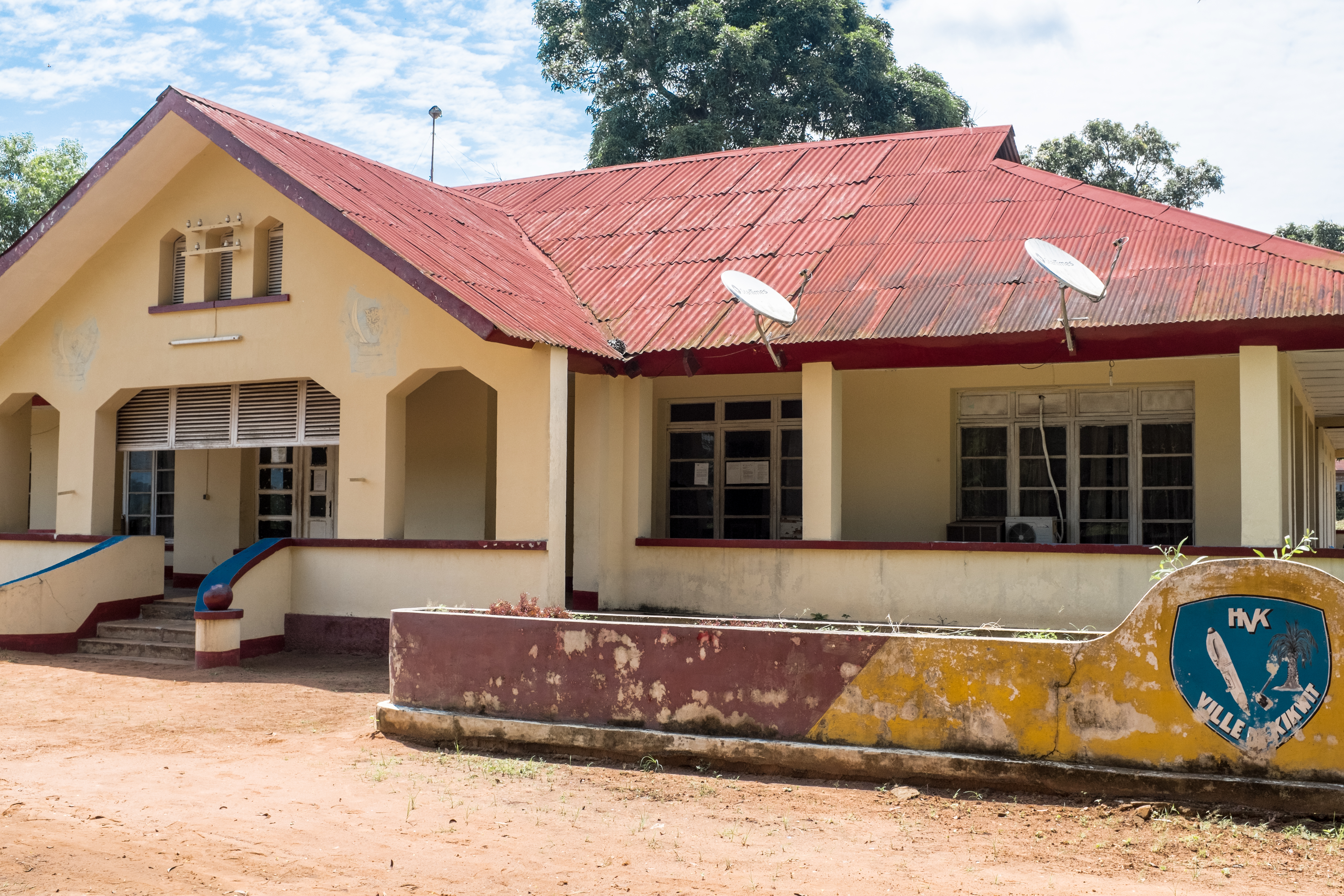
The city hall of Kikwit

Kikwit is administrated as a city, which is divided into decentralised territorial entities (entités territoriales décentralisées, ETD). The city is led by the mayor and the ETDs are led by bourgmestres. The city is also divided into four communes, further divided into 17 quarters. Although a 2008 law organised Kikwit and its communes into elected, decentralised governments, as of 2024, no local elections have taken place in Kikwit and all of its leaders are appointed by the president.

Communes of Kikwit
Commune	Population (2020 est.)
Kazamba	481,651
Lukemi	312,792
Lukolela	311,936
Nzinda	230,517

The city's revenue sources include taxes, permits, and parking fees, but it often underperforms financially as these funds are not adequately collected, resulting in high budget deficits in some years. The duties of the ETDs include tax collection for local development, as regulated by a 2021 city law. The number of people who are taxed varies, and people who lack money are sometimes extra-legally taxed in goods. Activities in the informal economy are not taxed, limiting the tax base. In addition, many people do not pay required taxes out of unfamiliarity with the law or are granted exemptions for reasons that are not always provided by law. Many others commit intentional tax evasion. As of 2026, about 50 taxpayers provide over 70% of tax revenue, though they would only provide 10% if all taxes were correctly received. As is the case in other Congolese cities, the ETDs of Kikwit are ineffective due to a lack of public interest. Embezzlement of government funds is common. Kikwit also lacks a deliberative body to manage budgets.

Courts in Kikwit include the court of the peace and the high court. The juvenile court of Kikwit opened on 15 April 2011. As of 2024, Kikwit does not have an Établissement de Garde et d'Education de l'Etat—a type of state-run social institution for juvenile offenders—so people sentenced by this court are instead sent to the city's prison. Kuluna criminals are active in the absence of security forces. According legal scholar Rossi Pumbulu Kimpasa, many are not punished due to corrupt officials or improper judicial procedures. They are also often subject to arrest without warrant.

Land rights in Kikwit are managed by the conservateur des titres immobiliers (property title registrar), with a division to manage contracts and another to map boundaries. Subdivisions are generally not approved until they are already settled, and land ownership is generally not registered. Disputes over land rights comprised 70% of cases at the city's court of the peace and high court between 2015 and 2021. Governor of Kwilu Serge Makongo announced a government plan to parcel public land in September 2020, but this had not occurred by 2024 due to conflicts with existing settlements.

Kikwit is the headquarters of the 1st Military Region of the Armed Forces of the Democratic Republic of the Congo. The Colonel Ebeya military camp is located in the commune of Kazamba.

== Infrastructure ==
Kikwit has poor-quality infrastructure, including for its electricity, sanitation, and water supply. Due to this, residents commonly refer to it as a "large village", not a "real city", in line with Congolese views on urbanity. On the other hand, it has technologies unavailable in smaller places, leading people to view it as a city.

=== Transportation ===
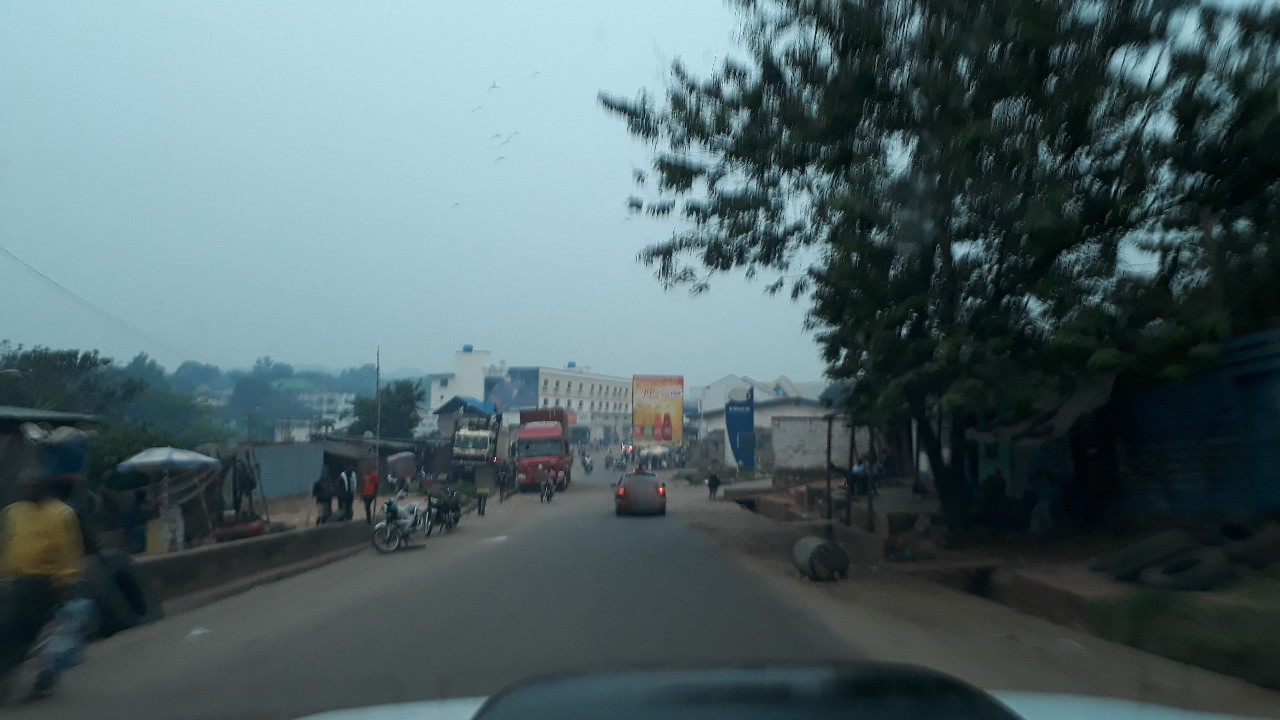
National Road 1 leading into Kikwit from the west

The only highway in Kikwit is National Road 1, which crosses the Kwilu River in Kikwit. It connects the city to Kinshasa, 480 kilometres (300 mi) to the west; Mwene-Ditu, 890 kilometres (550 mi) to the southeast; and Tshikapa, via a crossing of the Loange River. The city is poorly connected to nearby rural areas. The city's main road is the Boulevard National, part of the highway. There are only four paved roads (as of 2023), which are largely unmaintained.

Most residents travel through the city by foot or ride motorcycle taxis (wewa), as a result of the lack of paved roads. Motorcycles are more popular than automobiles; they surged in popularity in the 2010s, mostly inexpensive models imported from China. Most passengers of motorcycle taxis are men, and most are not poor, as automobile taxis are cheaper. Motorcycle crashes are common, especially during the wet season. Public discourse in the city views roads as economically vital yet dangerous, and it views crash victims, known as accidentés, as a consequence of urban life.

Kikwit is one of the main port cities of the Kwilu River. Shipments on the river are transferred to National Road 1 via the city. Though the city's main connection to Kinshasa is by road, some agricultural exports reach Kinshasa by river. Kikwit is also home to Kikwit Airport.

=== Healthcare ===
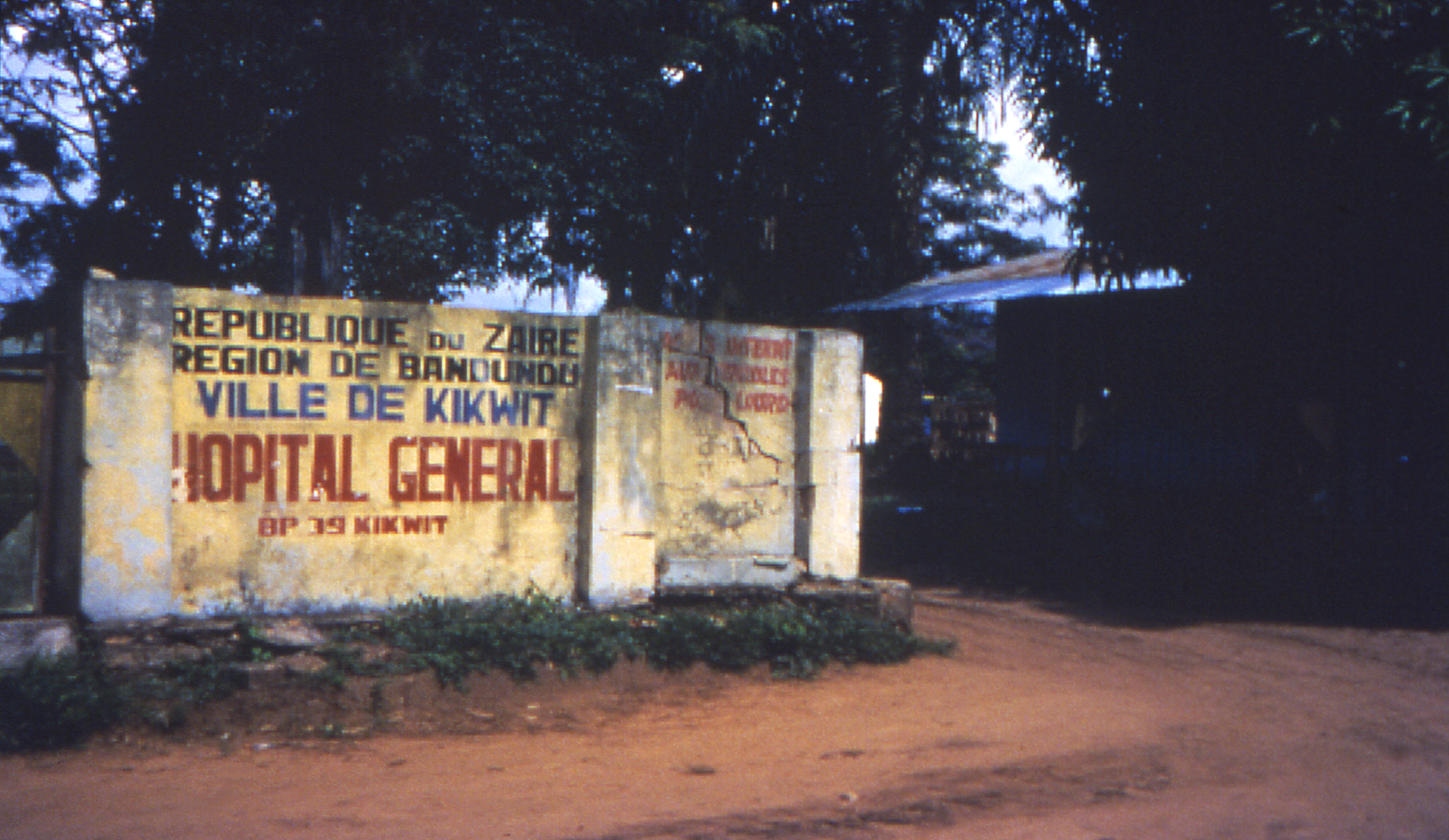
The Hôpital General de Réference de Kikwit in 1995

Kikwit is a major point in the DRC's health infrastructure, although, as a secondary city, its medical supply chain is largely reliant on Kinshasa and abroad. Since the early 20th century, state-run and non-governmental organisations have provided healthcare and medical technology, contributing to the city's reputation as a centre of biomedicine. Hospitals include the Hôpital General de Réference de Kikwit (Kikwit General Hospital; HGR), which is the main healthcare facility serving a 500-kilometre radius. It receives patients from other cities whose general hospitals are inadequately equipped. Kikwit also has well-equipped health centres run by private or religious organisations, competing with the HGR. The HGR and a few other institutions provide X-ray examinations, but the only provider of digital radiography is a religious hospital beyond city limits.

Several kinds of folk medicine exist in the city. These include nganga, or folk healers, which include tradipracticiens, such as bonesetters and herbalists. Spiritual healers are also common. Bonesetters often conduct fracture healing for injuries that are mostly caused by road crashes. Medical products and pharmaceuticals (such as anesthetics and anti-inflammatories) are widely available to folk medicine providers.

Kikwit has had many disease outbreaks. Diarrheal diseases such as cholera, Entamoeba, and Shigella are common, infecting about 30% of the population in 2017. HIV is also common, with the HGR treating 900 cases in January 2024, and the city's medical facilities often have shortages of HIV tests.

=== Utilities ===
Kikwit is not on the national electricity grid. Residents instead receive electricity from generators. They commonly run generators for a few hours in the evening and informally connect cables between houses to sell power to neighbours. Solar panels are also used, mostly imported from China, but they have a low capacity. As of 2019, 96% of households lack electricity. There have been plans for hydroelectric power from the Kakobola dam, beginning in 2011, which remain in the testing stage as of 2024. A power line from the Inga dams runs past the edge of Kikwit but does not connect to the city.

Kikwit does not have a municipal water supply system. Tap water is instead provided by an informal community-run network, which is unreliable and poorly purified. Most of Kikwit's drinking water is acquired from water resources without treatment, contributing to waterborne diseases. The Lukemi and Luini rivers are used for water supply as well as sewage and landfill, causing high pollution.

== Culture and media ==
The Musée National de Kikwit is one of seven institutions of the Institute of National Museums of Congo. Its exhibits include a statue of singer King Kester Emeneya and local archaeological artefacts, but these are poorly maintained as of 2025. Kikwit is a regional centre of painting. It was formerly home to the Théâtre du Petit Nègre, a theatre founded by playwright Nobert Mikanza in 1967. The city's football league is the Entente urbaine de football de Kikwit. Media in Kikwit includes the company Radiotelevision Vénus/Kikwit and the Catholic radio station Radio Tomisa, which runs news and educational programming.

== Education ==
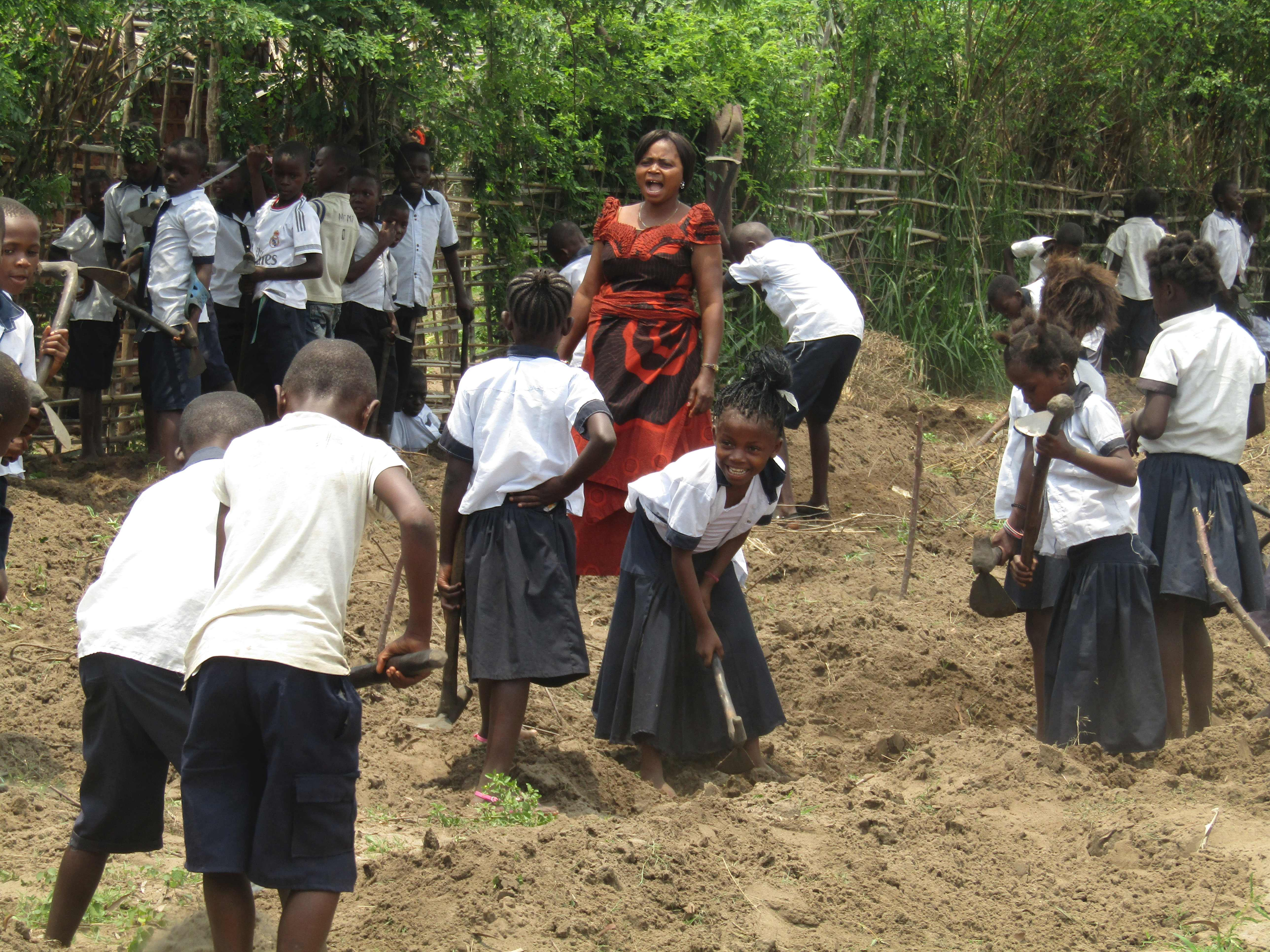
A class of schoolchildren in Kikwit

Kikwit is a regional centre of education. Kikwit is home to the University of Kikwit, a Catholic institution, as well as the Institut Supérieur Pédagogique (Superior Pedagogic Institute), a normal school affiliated with the national university system.

Catholic orders have established several educational institutions. Some schools were moved to Kikwit from rural areas that lacked teachers, such as the Institut de la Fraternité, a secondary school established by a Catholic order known as the Josephite Brothers in the 1960s. Specialised secondary schools include the Institut Professionnel Technique de Kikwit (Professional Technical Institute of Kikwit), a technical school.
