= Kwilu =

Kwilu may refer to

- Kwilu River, a river in Angola and the Democratic Republic of the Congo, tributary of the Kwango River near its confluence with the Kasai River near Bandundu
- Kwilu River, a river in Angola and at the border with the Democratic Republic of the Congo, tributary of the Kwango River near Popokabaka
- Kwilu River, a river in Angola and the Democratic Republic of the Congo, tributary of the Congo River in Mayombe
- Kwilu dynasty, a ruling family in the Kingdom of Kongo
- Kwilu Province, a province of the Democratic Republic of the Congo
- Kwilu Ngongo, a town in the Democratic Republic of the Congo near the Angolan border
- Nsi Kwilu, the region along the Kwilu River
- Kouilou-Niari River, a river in the Republic of the Congo
