= Anthony Swinburne =

British explorer and ivory trader

Anthony Bannister Swinburne
- Born: c. 1858
- Died: 1889 (aged 30); Boma, Congo Free State
- Occupations: explorer and ivory trader

Anthony Bannister Swinburne (c. 1858 – 1889) was a British explorer and ivory trader who served as an assistant to Henry Morton Stanley. He is known for developing the Léopoldville station, later to become the city of Kinshasa.

== Early years (1858–1881) ==
Anthony Bannister Swinburne was the son of a clergyman who died in 1866 and left very little money to his widow, Frances. She struggled to bring up Anthony, living in a series of lodging houses. Stanley first met Swinburne in September 1873. Swinburne was 15 and had just left Christ's Hospital School to work as an apprentice tea broker in the City of London. Stanley, who had never known his father and had a difficult upbringing, developed a paternal feeling to the boy.

At the end of 1873 Stanley was sent to West Africa to report on the Third Anglo-Ashanti War. He took the 16-year-old Swinburne with him as a clerk and valet. Stanley met the journalist G. A. Henty in East Africa, and Henty used the hero-worshipping Swinburne as the model for the character Frank Hargate in his 1884 novel By Sheer Pluck.

Swinburne became one of Stanley's most trusted companions. Stanley wrote in his The Congo and the Founding of Its Free State that in March 1880 Swinburne was one of 14 Europeans at Vivi on the lower Congo River other than Stanley. Swinburne, Sparhawk, Kirkbright and Moore were civilian superintendents and agents of stations. The other ten were the officers and sailors of the steamers Belgique, Espérance, En Avant, Royal and Jeune Africaine. Sparhawk was the only one to understand any local language.

== Léopoldville station head (1881–1886) ==

Stanley established a trading post on the shore of Ngaliema Bay in 1881, and named it Léopoldville in honor of King Leopold II who was Stanley's patron in the International Association of the Congo and later King-Sovereign of the Congo Free State. Stanley delegated the settlement (today called Kinshasa) to Swinburne. Swinburne also established a small station at nearby Nshasha in 1883 at Stanley's request. (Note: The village of Nshasha, about 10 kilometres (6.2 mi) from Léopoldville, was of Teke origin and had been visited by Italian Capuchin missionaries Girolamo da Montesarchio in 1654, then by Luca da Caltanisselta and Marcellino d'Atri in 1698. This name, modified to Kinshasa, replaced the colonial name Léopoldville in 1966. Stanley visited Nshasha in January and March 1882, and from then on the people of Nshasha began to routinely go to Léopoldville to offer ivory.)

Swinburne developed Léopoldville into an important trading station. Swinburne was friendly with the local people of the Congo, learned to speak the local language and lived with a local woman who gave him a child whom he adored. Stanley assigned a Congolese "boy" to Swinburne named Disasi Makulo, a former slave he had bought from Tippu Tip at Stanley Falls. Disasi found that Swinburne was a good person to work for, and conditions in the Kinshasa station were comfortable and interesting. Swinburne quickly developed the station. He had local fruits and vegetables planted, as well as European imports. His 3-bedroom clay house had a grass roof, with the huts of his Zanzibari soldiers behind it.

Swinburne was both brave and tactful. He managed to stop the French explorer Pierre Savorgnan de Brazza from taking over Léopoldville and forcibly establishing French control of the territory south of the Congo River. Brazza crossed the river in May 1884 with four canoes, and offered a higher price to the local chief if he would abandon his treaty with the Belgians. After a cool interview with Swinburne there was a fight with two sons of the chief, and Brazza beat a retreat.

== Ivory trader (1886–1889) ==
King Leopold II of Belgium refused to recognize the great value of Swinburne's work to the Belgian cause, and censored Stanley's 1885 book about the Congo Free State to remove its praise of Swinburne. He felt that the French might respond with anger to the story of Swinburne's confrontation with Brazza and decide to seize Léopoldville. In 1885 Leopold founded the Congo Free State and began to replace non-Belgian members of the Association Internationale du Congo with Belgians. Swinburne was dismissed in 1886 and returned to England, taking his two boys with him. He found work as an ivory trader under Henry Shelton Sanford. He returned later that year, bringing Disasi with him. He found a plentiful supply of ivory on sale in Kinshasa, and at one point had 60 tusks weighing 10 to 50 kilograms (22 to 110 lb). When he had raised enough money he bought a steamer so he could sail upriver and buy ivory at far lower prices.

Stanley was charged with leading the Emin Pasha Relief Expedition, which was to travel up the Congo River and overland to Equatoria rather than take the shorter route from the east coast. He met Swinburne in Paris in late January 1887. Swinburne was returning in the Congo from leave. He explained to Stanley how run down the king's flotilla had become, and hinted that he might lend him the company steamer Florida. When Stanley reached Boma he was told by Louis Valcke that the largest steamer, the Stanley, was damaged, the En Avant had no engine and the Royal was rotten. On 1 April 1887 Swinburne lent Stanley the Florida for use as a barge, despite knowing his boss Sanford would be furious about the loan.

In 1889, less than three years after his trip to Europe, his servant Disasi Makulo was with Swinburne when he contracted gastritis. He got ugly boils on his legs, and his condition quickly worsened. Disasi and a friend made a hammock to carry him to Boma. On the way they stopped at the mission station in Gombe, where the British Baptist George Grenfell took care of the invalid for two weeks. When that did not help, they travelled on to the Dutch factory in Ndunga, where Swinburne died at the age of thirty.

According to Disasi, "The whites we had met at that station immediately began preparing for the funeral. The ceremony was attended by all whites, dressed in fine costumes, and a large group of blacks. That day we thought the world was infinitely bitter, and our thoughts froze, for we did not know if we would ever receive any new support in life." At the age of 18, Disasi Makulo became an assistant to the missionary George Grenfell.

== Sources ==
- "Henry Morton Stanley", Reckless Books
- Jeal, Tim (6 October 2011), Stanley: Africa's Greatest Explorer, Faber & Faber, ISBN 978-0-571-26564-0
- Jeal, Tim (Spring 2017), "The African Shelves in Topography", The London Library Magazine
- Reybrouck, David van (31 August 2012), Kongo (in Swedish), Natur & Kultur, ISBN 978-91-27-13452-2
- Reybrouck, David van (2014), Congo: The Epic History of a People, translated by Sam Garrett
- Shomba Kinyamba, S.; Mukoka Nsenda, F.; Olela Nonga, D.; Kaminar, T.M.; Mbalanda, W. (2015), Monographie de la Ville de Kinshasha (PDF) (in French), Kinshasa – Montréal - Washington: ICREDES
- Stanley, Henry Morton (1885), The Congo and the Founding of Its Free State: A Story of Work and Exploration, Cambridge University Press, ISBN 978-1-108-03131-8
- Trapido, Joe (March–April 2016), "Kinshasa's Theater of Power" (PDF), New Left Review, no. 98
- Van Reybouck, David (2014), "2 "DIABOLICAL FILTH" Congo Under Leopold II 1885–1908", Congo: The Epic History of a People, HarperCollins
