= Nsi Kwilu =

Nsi Kwilu is a modern Kikongo respelling of "Essiquilu" the term used by the Italian Capuchin missionary Girolamo da Montesarchio in 1650 for the territory along the Kwilu River near Matadi in the modern-day Democratic Republic of Congo.

Jean Cuvelier determined this spelling, which means, in Kikongo, "the country of Kwilu". According to Montesarchio, it was in Nsi Kwilu that the first kings of Kongo reigned before they became the rulers of a great kingdom that controlled the northern part of modern-day Angola in the fifteenth century. It was an old religious centre, with rock engravings dating back to the 6th century.
