= Joseph de Munck =

Belgian Catholic Priest

Joseph de Munck was a Belgian Catholic Priest of the Redemptorist Order noted for his historical research relating to the Old Kingdom of Kongo. In many ways de Munck was the successor to Jean Cuvelier, whose work with documents and oral traditions made him one of the great historians of the kingdom. De Munck was particularly fond of the Kikongo languages, at times even keeping his personal notes in that language.

He was very active in doing research in oral traditions, for example, he sent catechists attached to the mission all over the Kikongo speaking parts of the Belgian Congo (and subsequently in the independent Republic of Congo and Republic of Zaire as well as much of northern Angola (both before and after independence) to collect tradition. He published relatively little of his work, the most famous product being the production of a fourth, augmented edition of Nkutama a mvila za makanda (originally compiled by Jean Cuvelier in 1934[1972]) and more significantly Kinkulu kia Nsi eto (Matadi, 1971), which was a short overview of Kongo history from earliest times to independence. Kinkulu kia Nsi eto made use of some of his oral tradition research, especially for the nineteenth century, and thus contains historical accounts which are nowhere else in print.
