= Enteromius chiumbeensis =

Conservation status
- Least Concern (IUCN 3.1)

Scientific classification
- Domain: Eukaryota
- Kingdom: Animalia
- Phylum: Chordata
- Class: Actinopterygii
- Order: Cypriniformes
- Family: Cyprinidae
- Subfamily: Smiliogastrinae
- Genus: Enteromius
- Species: E. chiumbeensis

Binomial name
- Enteromius chiumbeensis (Pellegrin, 1936)

Synonyms
- Barbus chiumbeensis Pellegrin, 1936

Species of fish

Enteromius chiumbeensis is a species of ray-finned fish in the genus Enteromius from the Kasai in the Democratic Republic of the Congo and the Kwango and Kwilu in Angola.

== Footnotes ==
- Froese, Rainer; Pauly, Daniel (eds.). "Enteromius chiumbeensis". FishBase.
