= KKW =

KKW or kkw may refer to:

- KKW, the DS100 code for Köln West station, Cologne, North Rhine-Westphalia, Germany
- KKW, the IATA code for Kikwit Airport, Democratic Republic of the Congo
- KKW, the Indian Railways station code for Kankavli railway station, Maharashtra, India
- kkw, the ISO 639-3 code for Kukuya language, Republic of the Congo
