= Jean Cuvelier =

Belgian missionary and bishop (1882–1962)

Jean Cuvelier C.Ss.R.
- Vicar Apostolic of Matadi
- Church: Catholic Church
- See: Vicariate Apostolic of Matadi
- In office: 28 June 1929 – May 1938
- Predecessor: Joseph Heintz
- Successor: Alphonse Marie Van den Bosch
- Other post: Titular Bishop of Circesium (1930-1962)

Orders
- Ordination: 22 September 1906
- Consecration: 24 August 1930 by Willem Marinus van Rossum

Personal details
- Born: 24 January 1882 Halle, Province of Brabant, Belgium
- Died: 13 August 1962 (aged 80)

Jean Cuvelier (1882–1962) was a Belgian Redemptorist missionary and bishop of Matadi in Belgian Congo from 1930 until his death in 1962. Cuvelier was notable for his interest in the history of the Kingdom of Kongo, which he saw as a route to evangelization in his time. By stressing the Christian nature of the old kingdom, he hoped to increase the attachment of Kongo parishioners to the Catholic Church as opposed to Protestantism or traditional religions.

Cuvelier started the Kikongo language missionary newspaper Kukiele in 1928 with a mixture of missionary news, cultural articles and especially historical accounts of the old kingdom. In his articles, which initially bore the title "Lusansu" Cuvelier began writing a history of Kongo using oral traditions that he collected combined with increasingly detailed historical documentation. His inspiration came from reading a manuscript written in 1913 by two catechists, Mpetelo Boka, and Lievan Sakala Mboku, for Cuvelier's manuscript, "Kongo een vroeger eeuw" (Kongo in earlier centuries) written in 1926 already incorporates their writing as well as citations from well-known 17th-century writers such as Giovanni Cavazzi da Montecuccolo.

In 1928–29, Cuvelier took advantage of his position as inspector of schools to visit mission schools throughout the Diocese of Matadi, and gathered traditions, which he collected in small school notebooks. Typically he called these notebooks "Mvila" from the Kikongo term for a clan or its heraldic motto, the common stuff of Kongo oral tradition. All of this material went into his Kukiele articles, and then into his first French language summary of Kongo history and tradition, "Traditions Congolaises" published in 1930.

In 1934 Cuvelier published the first edition of Nkutama a mvila za makanda which was a catalogue of clan mottos and histories that he had collected, including information on some 500 clans. At the same time he continue further historical work in European archives, especially in Rome.

His biography of King Afonso I entitled L'ancien Congo was published in Dutch/Flemish in 1944 as Het Oud Konigrijk Kongo, and in French 1946 and became a standard interpretation of Kongo history, especially the ethnographic and political appendices and notes that described many aspects of the old kingdoms political and economic structure. Cuvelier continued his publication of source material with a French translation of the writing of Lorenzo da Lucca in 1953, translations of crucial early documents from Roman archives in 1954 (in collaboration with Louis Jadin a canon with the Belgian Institute historique Belge de Rome, and partial translations of the works of Marcellino d'Atri, Luca da Caltanisetta and Girolamo da Montesarchio in the scientific-historical journal Ngonge Kongo in the 1960s. He also contributed many short biographies of Kongo kings and other personages to the colonial reference work Biographie Coloniale Belge in 1955.

Upon his death in 1962, Cuvelier's papers including many unpublished manuscripts, book and article drafts, transcriptions and translations of documentation relevant to Kongo history, and his precious field notebooks went to the Redemptorist archive in Leuven, Belgium, and in 2000 were transferred to the Archives of the Katholieke Universiteit Leuven.

== See also ==
- List of people related to the Democratic Republic of the Congo
