= Nkutama a mvila za makanda =

Kongo-language book published in 1934

Nkutama a mvila za makanda is a "Catalogue of Praise Names of Clans" in the Kongo language compiled and edited by Father Jean Cuvelier comprising a list of about 500 Kongo clans in alphabetical order. The list was compiled by Cuvelier between 1926 and 1934 when he was inspector of schools for the Redemptorist Order in the Belgian Congo. The entries typically give the name of the clan, its praise name or mvila, as well as its traditional itinerary and sometimes additional information drawn from its traditions. Often Cuvelier specified the village where he collected the tradition as well.

Cuvelier's personal papers, now housed at the Catholic University at Leuven (or Louvain) in Belgium, contain a considerable number of his original manuscripts from which the book was published, normally in school notebooks entitled "Mvila".

The book was first published in 1934 at the mission's press, and a second edition was brought out under the same name in the missionary newspaper Kukiele in 1944. This second edition was not complete, but contained information and clan names not found in the original edition. A third edition also appeared, although its location and circumstances are not known. Following Cuvelier's death in 1962, his colleague Joseph de Munck brought out a fourth edition in 1972, which contained all the changes of the earlier ones, as well as a slightly reorganized format.
