= Lukemi =

- Commune
- Country: DR Congo
- Province: Kwilu
- City: Kikwit

Lukemi is a commune in the city of Kikwit, Kwilu province, in the Democratic Republic of Congo.
