= André Giraud Pindi Mwanza Mayala =

Congolese Catholic prelate (born in 1964)

The Most Reverend André Giraud Pindi Mwanza Mayala
- Bishop of Matadi, Democratic Republic of the Congo
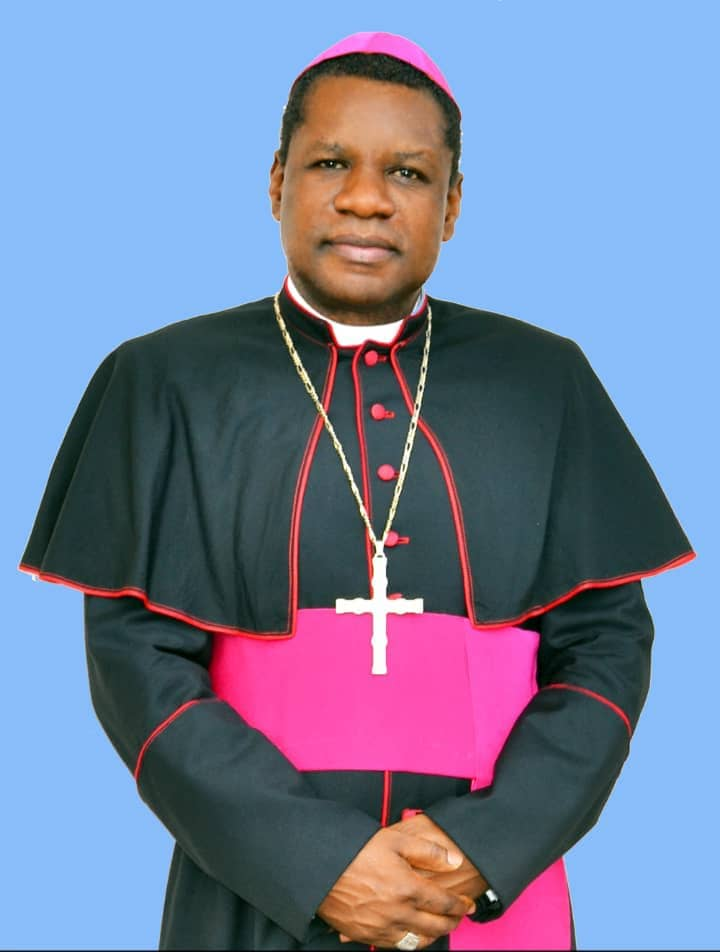
- Church: Catholic Church
- Archdiocese: Roman Catholic Archdiocese of Kinshasa
- See: Roman Catholic Diocese of Matadi
- Appointed: 23 April 2022
- Installed: 16 July 2022
- Predecessor: Daniel Nlandu Mayi
- Successor: Incumbent

Orders
- Ordination: 18 September 1994
- Consecration: 16 July 2022 by Cardinal Fridolin Ambongo Besungu
- Rank: Bishop

Personal details
- Born: André Giraud Pindi Mwanza Mayala; 24 July 1964 (age 61); Kindomingielo, Diocese of Matadi, Kongo Central, Democratic Republic of the Congo
- Motto: "Infunde Amorem Cordibus" (Pour Love Into Our Hearts)

Styles of André Giraud Pindi Mwanza Mayala
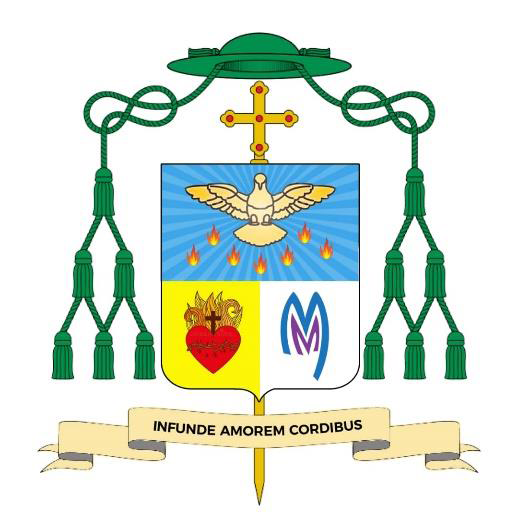
- Reference style: Your Lordship; The Most Reverend
- Spoken style: His Lordship
- Religious style: Archbishop

André Giraud Pindi Mwanza Mayala (born 24 July 1964) is a Congolese Catholic prelate who serves as Bishop of the Roman Catholic Diocese of Matadi, in the Democratic Republic of the Congo, since 23 April 2022. Before that, from 18 September 1994 until he was appointed bishop, he was a priest of the same diocese, in the Metropolitan Province of Kinshasa. He was appointed bishop on 23 April 2022 by Pope Francis. He was consecrated and installed at Matadi, Democratic Republic of the Congo, on 16 July 2022. While a priest, he served as Apostolic Administrator of the Diocese of Matadi from 6 March 2021 until 23 April 2022.

== Background and education ==
André Giraud Pindi was born on 24 July 1964 at Kindomingielo, Diocese of Matadi, Kongo Central, in the Democratic Republic of the Congo. He studied at the Kibula Minor Seminary from 1976 until 1984. He studied Philosophy at Mayidi Major Seminary from 1984 until 1988. He then studied Theology at the Saint Jean XXIII Major Seminary in Kinshasa from 1988 until 1993. He studied at the Catholic University of Congo in Kinshasa from 1994 until 1997. He graduated with a Licentiate in Canon Law from there. Later, he studied at the Pontifical Lateran University in Rome, Italy from 2002 until 2006, graduating with a Doctorate degree In utroque jure (both Cannon Law and Civil Law).

== Priest ==
He was ordained a priest of the Roman Catholic Diocese of Matadi on 18 September 1994. He served as priest until 23 April 2022.

While a priest, he served in various roles and locations including as:

- Studies leading to the award of a Licentiate in Canon Law at the Catholic University of Congo in Kinshasa from 1994 until 1997.
- Lecturer in Law at the Interdiocesan Major Seminary of Mayidi from 1997 until 2002.
- Studies leading to the award of a Doctorate in Utroque Jure at the Pontifical Lateran University in Rome, Italy from 2002 until 2006.
- Fidei donum and parish priest in solidum in the pastoral unit Notre Dame de Compassion from 2006 until 2013.
- Defender of the Bond in the Diocese of Lausanne, Geneva and Friborg in Switzerland from 2006 until 2019.
- Moderator and Dean of the Pastoral Unit of Nyon-Terre Sainte, Diocese of Lausanne from 2013 until 2019.
- Vicar General of the Diocese of Matadi from 2019 until 2021.
- Apostolic Administrator of the Diocese of Matadi from 2021 until 2022.

== As bishop ==
On 23 Apr 2022, The Holy Father appointed Reverend Father Monsignor André Giraud Pindi Mwanza Mayala, previously the apostolic administrator of the diocese, as the new Local Ordinary of Matadi. He was consecrated and installed at Matadi, on 16 July 2022 by the hands of Cardinal Fridolin Ambongo Besungu, Archbishop of Kinshasa assisted by Archbishop Ettore Balestrero, Titular Archbishop of Victoriana and Bishop Dominique Bulamatari Kizayakana, Bishop of Molegbe.

== See also ==
- Catholic Church in the Democratic Republic of the Congo

== Succession table ==
Catholic Church titles
Preceded by Daniel Nlandu Mayi (21 September 2010 - 6 March 2021)	Bishop of Matadi (since 23 April 2022)	Succeeded by Incumbent
