= Kikwit Airport =

Kikwit Airport Aéroport de Kikwit
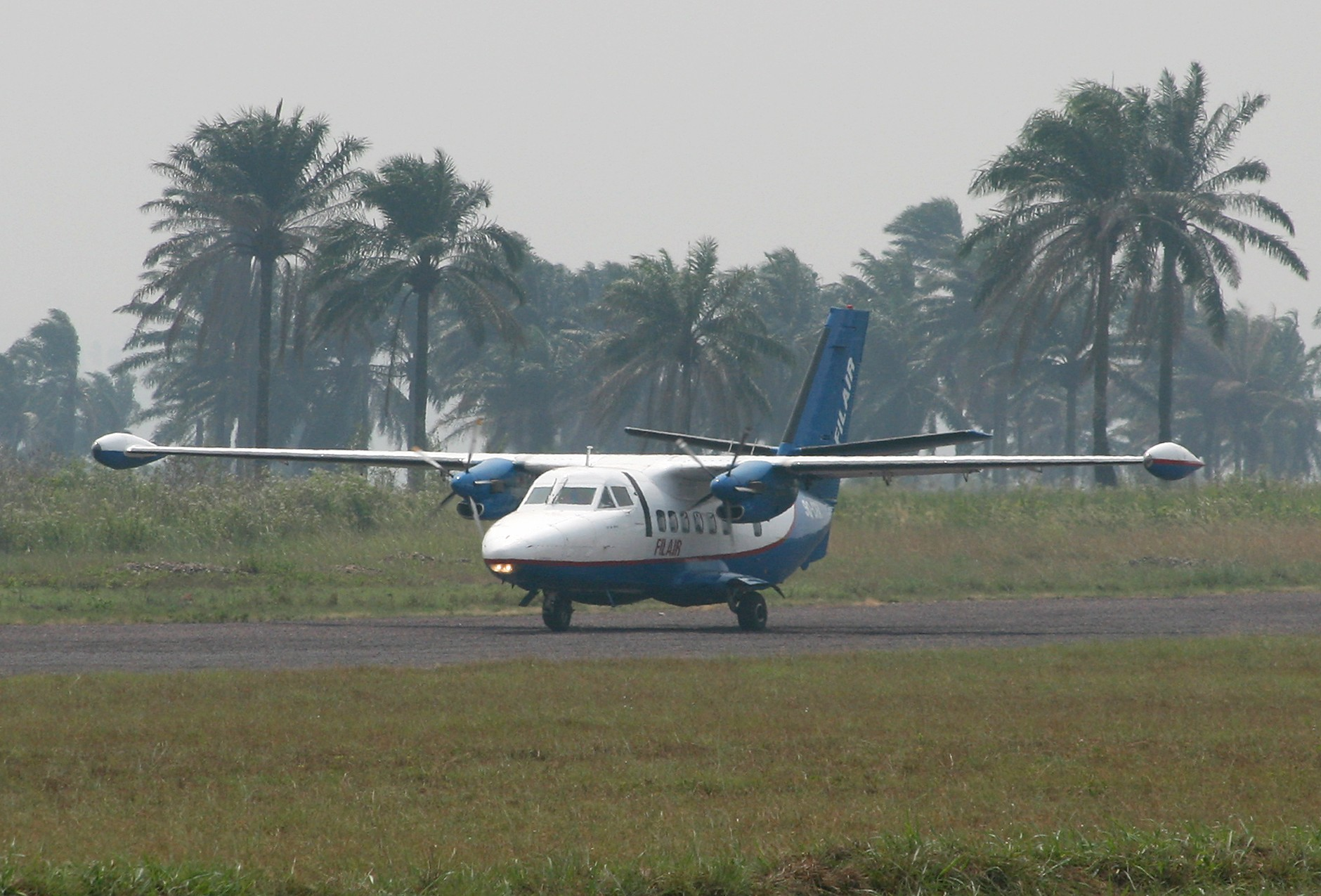
- IATA: KKW; ICAO: FZCA

Summary
- Airport type: Public
- Operator: Government
- Location: Kikwit, Democratic Republic of the Congo
- Elevation AMSL: 1,572 ft (479 m)
- Coordinates: 05°02′09″S 018°47′08″E

Map
- Location in the Democratic Republic of the Congo

Runways
Direction	Length		Surface
Direction	m	ft	Surface
06/24	1,570	5,151	Asphalt
- Source: WAD GCM

Kikwit Airport (IATA: KKW, ICAO: FZCA) is an airport serving the Kwilu River port of Kikwit, the largest city of Kwilu Province in the Democratic Republic of the Congo. The airport is within the city limits.

The airport has one asphalt-paved runway, which is 5151 feet (1570 meters) long and 95 feet (29 meters) wide.

The Kikwit non-directional beacon (Ident: KKW) is located 1.8 nautical miles (3.3 km) east of the airport.

== Airlines and destinations ==
Airlines	Destinations
Kin Avia	Kinshasa–N'Dolo

== See also ==
- Transport in the Democratic Republic of the Congo
- List of airports in the Democratic Republic of the Congo
