= Feronia Inc. =

Multinational corporation

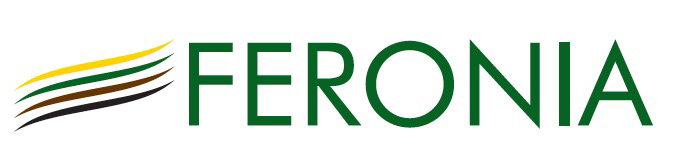
- Type: Public
- Traded as: TSX-V: FRN
- Industry: Agriculture, Agribusiness
- Founded: 1911
- Headquarters: No. 372, Avenue Colonel Mondjiba, Gombe, Kinshasa, Democratic Republic of the Congo
- Key people: Frank Braeken (Chairman), Xavier de Carniere, CEO
- Products: beans, rice, oil seeds, grains, palm oil
- Website: http://www.feronia.com

Feronia Inc. was a multinational corporation that produces palm oil and other agricultural products in the Democratic Republic of the Congo while headquartered in Canada. In operation since 1911 as a large-scale commercial farmland and plantation operator in the Democratic Republic of the Congo (“DRC”), the Company used modern agricultural practices to operate and develop its oil palm plantations and arable farming business division. The company filed for bankruptcy in 2020 and was delisted from the TSX Venture Exchange.

Feronia's oil palm plantations subsidiary is PHC - fr:Plantations et huileries du Congo. Feronia PHC operates in the Équateur, Mongala and Tshopo provinces of DRC and consists of three established plantations together with associated infrastructure. The principal products of Feronia PHC are crude palm oil (CPO) and palm kernel oil (PKO). The CPO and PKO products are transported by barge to the capital city of Kinshasa where they are sold into the local markets with any surplus sold to international markets. The local DRC market currently consists of two refining factories located in Kinshasa which purchase 100% of PHC's production. The refined products which are produced by these factories are sold into the local market in a variety of forms.

Commencing operations in 1911 and founded by W. H. Lever as Huileries du Congo Belge (HCB), later fr:Plantations Lever au Congo, Plantations Lever au Zaire, and ultimately fr:Plantations et huileries du Congo the plantations have been in continuous operation since this time. The operation was started as a division of Unilever and for many years was a key operating subsidiary of the multinational. It later formed the nucleus of the United Africa Company which ultimately came under the control of Unilever. The United Africa Company was the principal supplier to the United Kingdom of several key commodities including palm oil, ground nuts, and cocoa. Each of the plantations are located either adjacent to, or in close proximity to the Congo River. Feronia PHC currently employs approximately 4,000 people making it one of the largest private sector employers in Central Africa.

Local and international organizations have recently voiced criticism of Feronia's operations in the DRC, for carrying out what they characterize as a massive land grab, as well as for operating a brutal system of labour exploitation and community harassment and making corrupt payouts to politically-connected individuals in the DRC. Feronia disputes these allegations and says it is making a huge difference to people's lives in one of the World's poorest places.
