= Kwenge River =

Stream in Bandundu Province, Democratic Republic of the Congo

Coordinates: 4.840404°S 18.721991°E

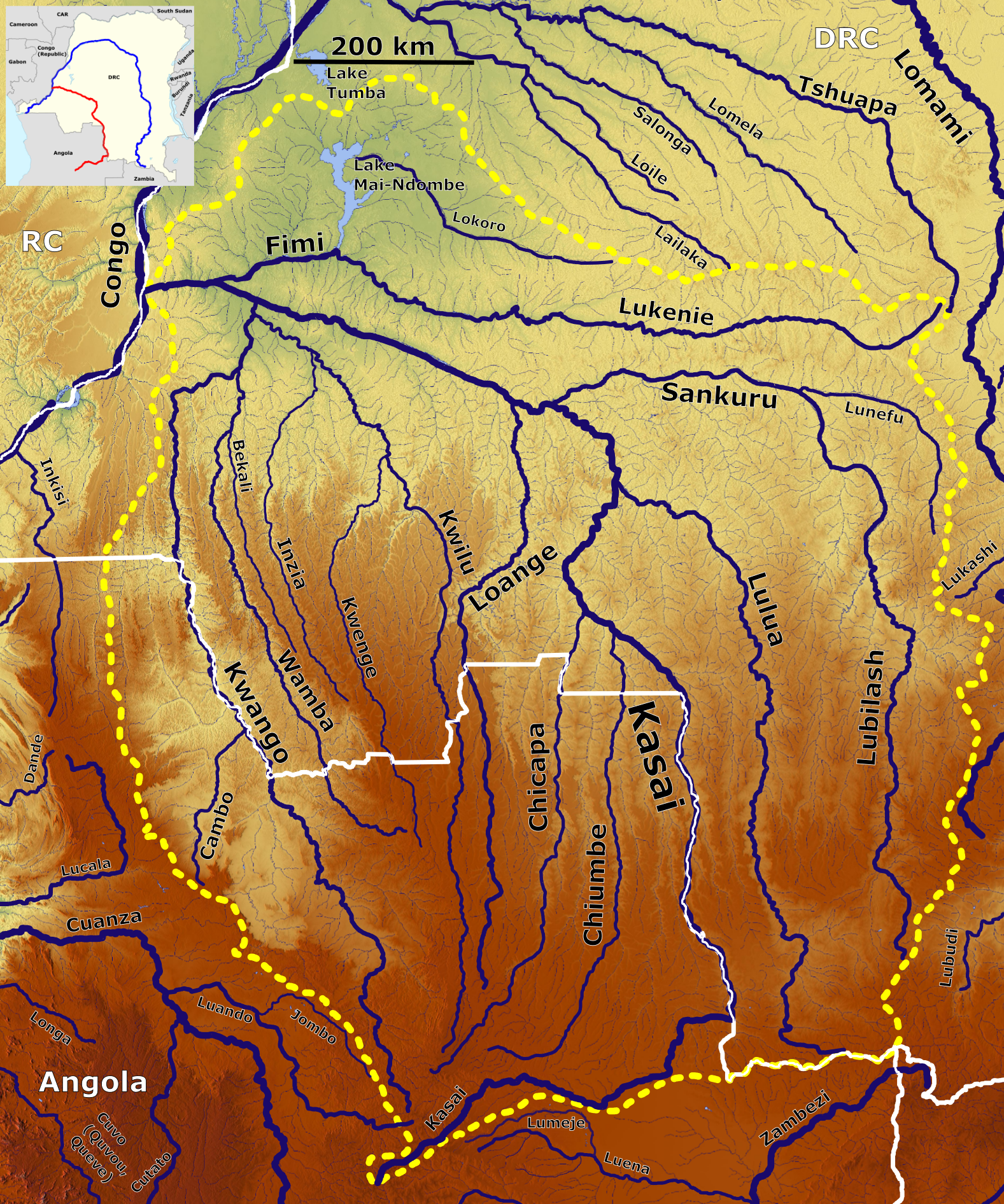
The Kwenge River in the Kasai catchment (center left)

The Kwenge River (French: Rivière Kwenge) is a stream in the Bandundu Province of the Democratic Republic of the Congo.

The river begins in Angola and then for about 6 kilometres (3.7 mi) it forms a short part of the Angola–DRC border. It flows north from the Angola border through the Kwango and Kwilu districts, joining the Kwilu River below Kikwit. Lusanga, formerly Leverville, is at the confluence of the Kwenge and Kwilu rivers.

The land between the Kwilu and the Kwenge was first occupied be the Pende people. The Suku people, who came to the region from the Kwango River valley in the 1800s, live in the savanna region between the upper Bakali and Kwenge rivers. The lowest part of the river valley contains strips of periodically or permanently flooded land.
