= Diocese of Matadi =

Roman Catholic diocese in the Democratic Republic of the Congo

Diocese of Matadi Dioecesis Kisantuensis

Location
- Country: Democratic Republic of the Congo
- Metropolitan: Kinshasa

Statistics
- Area: 31,000 km^{2} (12,000 sq mi)
- Population: Total; Catholics: (as of 2004); 1,750,000; 665,000 (38.0%)

Information
- Rite: Latin Rite

Current leadership
- Pope: Leo XIV
- Bishop: André Giraud Pindi Mwanza Mayala
- Bishops emeritus: Daniel Nlandu Mayi

The Roman Catholic Diocese of Matadi (Latin: Matadien(sis)) is a diocese located in the city of Matadi in the ecclesiastical province of Kinshasa in the Democratic Republic of the Congo.

== History ==
- 1 July 1911: Established as Apostolic Prefecture of Matadi from the Apostolic Vicariate of Léopoldville
- 23 July 1930: Promoted as Apostolic Vicariate of Matadi
- 10 November 1959: Promoted as Diocese of Matadi

== Bishops ==
- Prefect Apostolic of Matadi (Latin Rite)
  - Fr. Giuseppe Heintz, C.SS.R. (1 August 1911 – 1928 or 1929)
  - Jean Cuvelier, C.SS.R. (28 June 1929 - 23 July 1930); see below
- Vicars Apostolic of Matadi (Latin Rite)
  - Jean Cuvelier, C.SS.R. (23 July 1930 - May 1938); see above
- Bishops of Matadi (Roman rite)
  - Alphonse Marie Van den Bosch, C.SS.R. (14 June 1938 - 18 December 1965)
  - Simon N'Zita Wa Ne Malanda (18 December 1965 - 8 March 1985)
  - Raphaël Lubaki Nganga (8 March 1985 - 26 March 1987)
  - Gabriel Kembo Mamputu (21 June 1988 - 21 September 2010)
  - Daniel Nlandu Mayi (21 September 2010 - 6 March 2021)
  - André Giraud Pindi Mwanza Mayala (since 23 April 2022)

=== Coadjutor bishops ===
- Raphaël Lubaki Nganga (1971-1985)
- Daniel Nlandu Mayi (2008-2010)

=== Auxiliary bishop ===
- Simon N’Zita Wa Ne Malanda (1960-1965), appointed Bishop here

== See also ==
- Roman Catholicism in the Democratic Republic of the Congo

== Sources ==
- GCatholic.org
- Catholic Hierarchy
