= Kazamba =

- Commune
- Country: DR Congo
- Province: Kwilu
- City: Kikwit

Kazamba is a commune in the city of Kikwit, Kwilu province, in the Democratic Republic of Congo. It was settled in the 1970s as a neighborhood for veterans. It received official recognition in 2007.
