= University of Kikwit =

Public university in the DRC

- Université de Kikwit (French)
- Former names: Kikwit Center University
- Type: Public
- Established: 27 September 2010; 15 years ago
- Location: Kikwit, Democratic Republic of the Congo; 5.0389°S 18.8221°E
- Campus: Urban
- Nickname: UNIKI
- Website: University website

The University of Kikwit (UNIKI) is a public university in the Democratic Republic of the Congo, located in the province of Bandundu, city of Kikwit. At its creation, it was an Extension of the University of Kinshasa, then called University Centre of Kikwit (CUK). As of 2012, instruction is in French.

== History ==
The University was created as Kikwit Center University (CUK), an extension of the University of Lubumbashi, and became autonomous in 2010 following Ministerial order No. 157/MINESU/CABMIN/EBK/PK/2010 27 September 2010.

== See also ==
- Kikwit
- Bandundu
- List of universities in the Democratic Republic of the Congo
