= Daniel Nlandu Mayi =

Congolese catholic priest (1953–2021)

Most Reverend Daniel Nlandu Mayi
- Bishop of Matadi
- Church: Roman Catholic Church
- Metropolis: Roman Catholic Archdiocese of Kinshasa
- Diocese: Roman Catholic Diocese of Matadi
- Installed: 21 September 2010
- Term ended: 6 March 2021
- Predecessor: Gabriel Kembo Mamputu
- Successor: André Giraud Pindi Mwanza Mayala
- Previous posts: Auxiliary Bishop of Kinshasa (October 1999–2008); Titular Bishop of Cataquas

Personal details
- Born: 19 October 1953 Kinkosi, Belgian Congo
- Died: 12 December 2021 (aged 68) Matadi, Democratic Republic of Congo
- Motto: "Pax Vobis" (Peace to you)

Styles of Daniel Nlandu Mayi
- Reference style: Your Lordship; The Most Reverend
- Spoken style: His Lordship
- Religious style: Archbishop

Daniel Nlandu Mayi (19 October 1953 – 12 December 2021) was a Congolese Roman Catholic prelate. He served as an auxiliary bishop of the Roman Catholic Archdiocese of Kinshasa from 1999 to 2008. He was then appointed the Bishop of the Roman Catholic Diocese of Matadi from 2010 until his early resignation on 6 March 2021, due to declining health.

== Biography ==
Born on 19 October 1953 in Kinkosi, present-day Kongo Central province, Mayi was ordained a Catholic priest in the Archdiocese of Kinshasa in April 1980. In October 1999, he was appointed an auxiliary bishop of Kinshasa and ordained in January 2000. He was simultaneously appointed the titular bishop of Cataquas as well. Mayi later served as the Apostolic Administrator of the Archdiocese of Kinshasa from January 2007 to February 2008 when Bishop Laurent Monsengwo Pasinya was elevated as a Catholic Cardinal.

Mayi was next appointed a coadjutor bishop of the Roman Catholic Diocese of Matadi, located in the port city of Matadi, from November 2008 to 2010. He was named Bishop of Matadi by Pope Benedict XVI on 21 September 2010. He held the position until his resignation was accepted by Pope Francis on 6 March 2021, due to declining health. Bishop André Giraud Pindi was appointed acting Apostolic Administrator of Matadi until a permanent successor could be selected.

On 11 December 2021 Bishop Emeritus Nlandu Mayi celebrated a mass at the Tumba Dia Zayi Institute, a school operated by the De La Salle Brothers. He died the following day, 12 December, at Midema Hospital in Matadi at the age of 68.

Mayi's funeral mass was held at Our Lady of Fatima Catholic Church in Matadi on 21 December 2021. He was buried at Notre Dame Mediatrice Cathedral, the mother church of the Diocese of Matadi.
