= Nzinda =

- Commune
- Country: DR Congo
- Province: Kwilu
- City: Kikwit
- Time zone: UTC+1 (West Africa Time)

Nzinda or Nzida is a commune and a town in the city of Kikwit in the Democratic Republic of Congo.
