= Lukolela, Kikwit =

Lukolela
- Commune
- Country: DR Congo
- Province: Kwilu
- City: Kikwit

Lukolela is a commune in the city of Kikwit, Kwilu province, in the Democratic Republic of Congo.
