= 1995 Kikwit Ebola outbreak =

Ebola outbreak

1995 Kikwit ebola outbreak
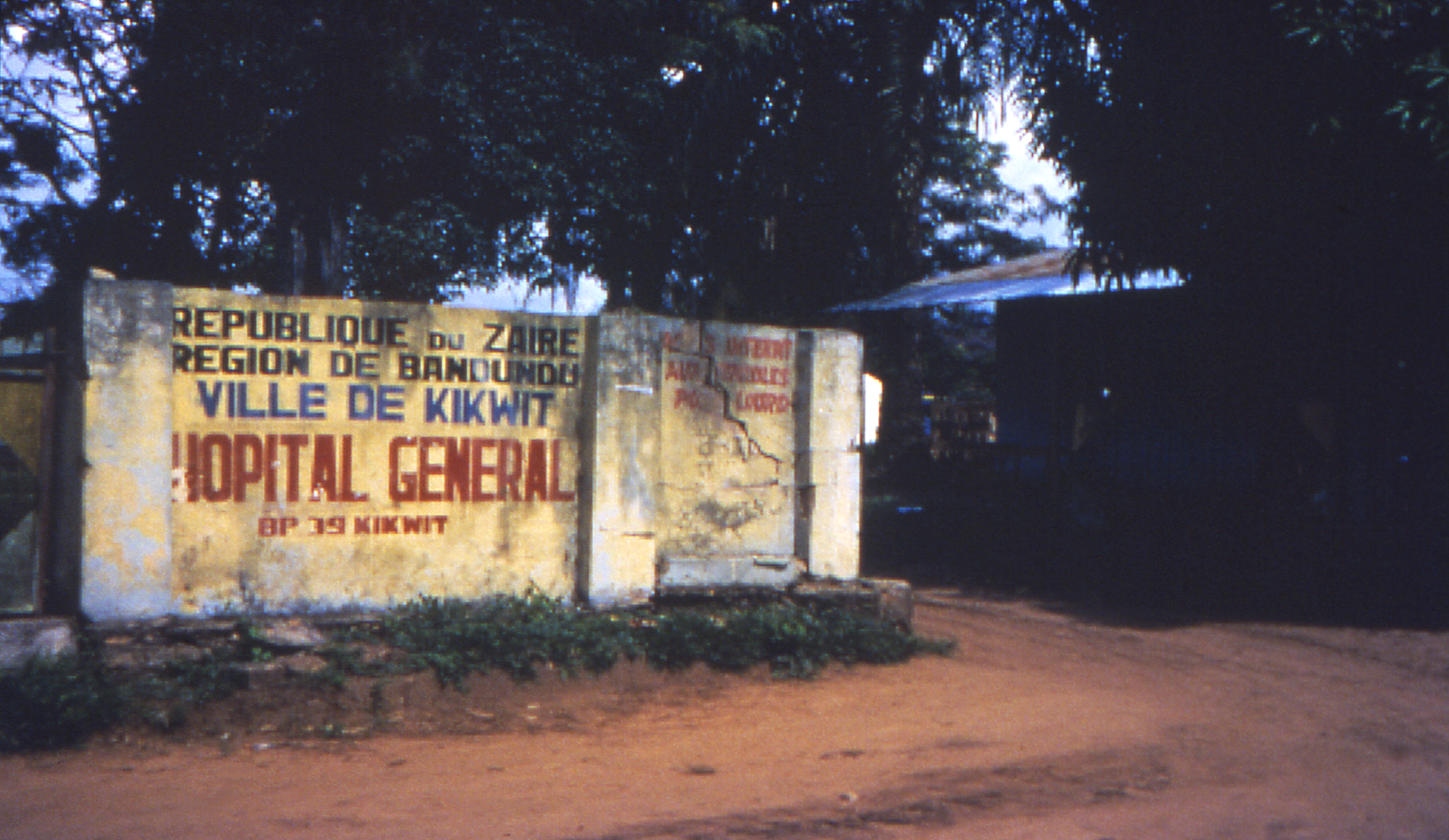
- The entrance to the General Hospital in 1995, which was an area in which the ebola spread
- Reported cases: 315
- Reported fatal cases: 254 (81%)
- Disease: Ebola virus disease
- Species of bacteria involved: Orthoebolavirus zairense
- Duration of outbreak: 7 months
- Time period: January-August 1995

In 1995, the city of Kikwit and its surrounding areas in Bandundu Province, in the Democratic Republic of the Congo (then Zaire), experienced an outbreak of Ebola virus disease, caused by Ebola virus of the species Orthoebolavirus zairense. With the earliest documented case having symptom onset on the 6th January, it led to a total of 315 reported cases, of which 254 (81%) were fatal. (Note: The exact number of cases and fatalities is disputed. These figures are from the CDC.)

== Outbreak timeline ==
The outbreak was retrospectively traced back to 35-year-old Gaspard Menga, who worked in the forest surrounding Kikwit, raising crops and making charcoal. He was admited to the Kikwit General Hospital, on 6th January 1995, where he later died on the 13th. Upon his death, doctors initially mistook the disease to be shigellosis, a diarrhoeal disease caused by bacteria.

The ebola virus spread within the local community, particularly within Menga's family, of whom 13 out of 23 died due to the virus. The virus spread within the General Hospital, in a nosocomial outbreak. In mid-April, the outbreak escalated, following surgeries performed on an infected laboratory technician, which resulted in numerous hospital staff becoming infected. The outbreak continued to spread primarily through families and hospitals.

On 4th May, blood samples from 14 acutely ill patients were sent to the Centers for Disease Control and Prevention (CDC), in Atlanta, Georgia. An isolation unit at Kikwit General Hospital was also established.

On 8th May, secondary hospitals were closed down to prevent the spread of the virus, as the World Health Organisation (WHO) agreed to send medical teams.

On 9th May, the CDC confirmed a diagnosis of Ebola haemorrhagic fever. (Note: Alternative source states May 10th)

Between 10-19th May several international medical teams arrived, including WHO, Doctors Without Borders, and the CDC.

On 11th May, isolation unit standards improved, leading to a dramatic reduction in healthcare providers becoming infected.

On 14th July, the isolation unit closed.

On 31st July, the convalescence unit closed.

On 8th August, Doctors Without Borders, the last international medical team, left. The total length of the outbreak was 7 months.

== Ebola ==
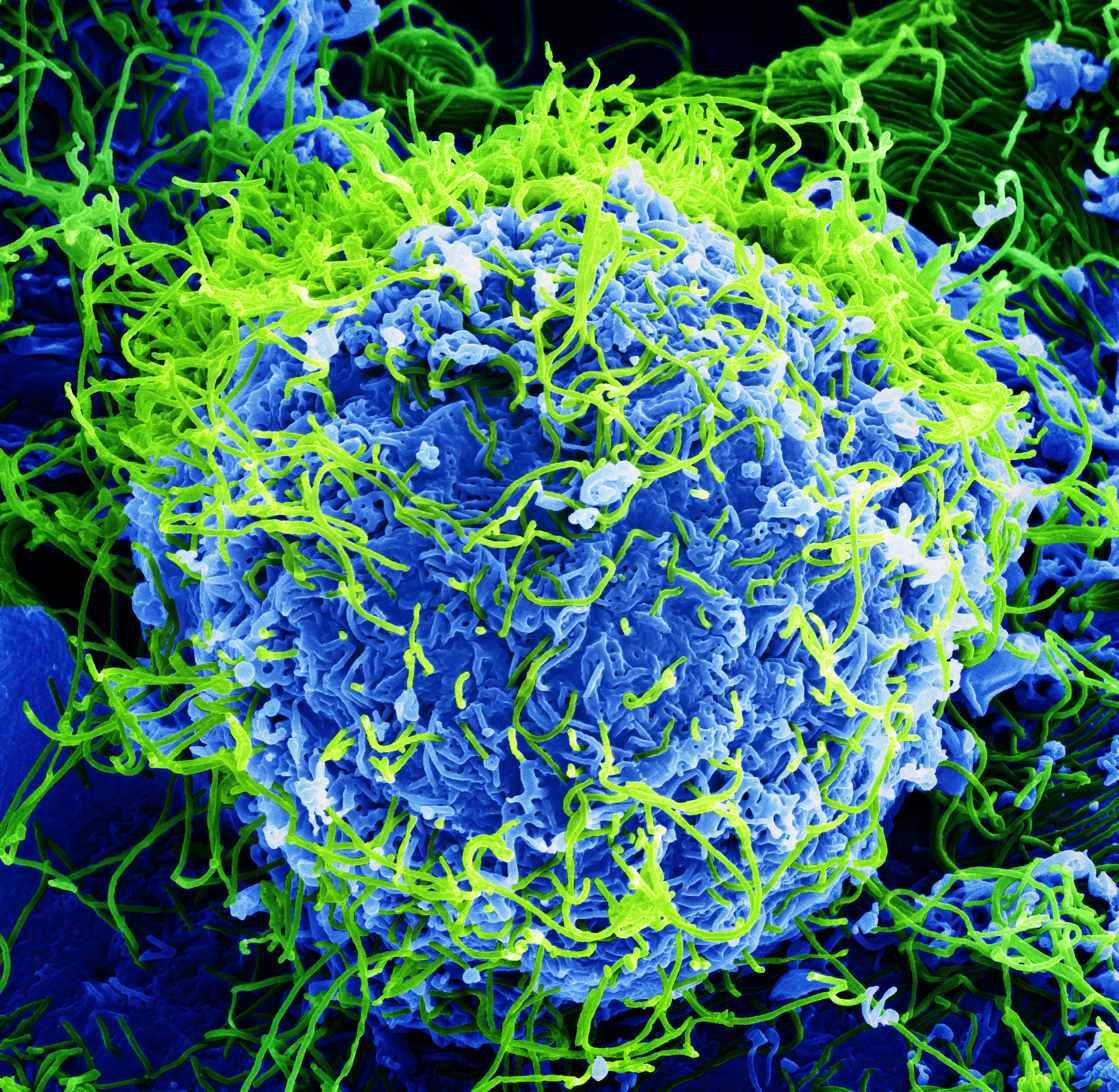
A false colour scanning electron micrograph of an Ebola virus particle

Ebola virus disease (Note: Also known as Ebola or Ebola haemorrhagic fever) is a zoonotic viral haemorrhagic fever in humans and other primates, caused by four of the six known ebolaviruses. Symptoms typically start anywhere between two days and three weeks after infection. The first symptoms are usually fever, sore throat, muscle pain, and headaches. These are usually followed by vomiting, diarrhoea, rash, hepatic and renal dysfunction, at which point some people begin to bleed both internally and externally. Outbreaks of the disease have had a mortality rate of between 25 and 90%, averaging out at approximately 50%. The viral species involved and timing of treatment play a critical role in its prognosis. Death is often due to shock from fluid loss, and typically occurs between 6 and 16 days after the first symptoms appear.

== Response ==
Several disease control measures were undertaken, by different parties.

==== Response of the Zairian Government ====
The Government of Zaire asked the world community for assistance with the outbreak. The government also quarantined the Kikwit area, including closing roads. Additionally, it closed surrounding health facilities near Kikwit, in an attempt to prevent the spread of Ebola.

==== Responses of international organisations ====
The WHO, CDC and Doctors Without Borders helped staff hospitals, provided barrier supplies and disinfectants, improved the isolation unit's effectiveness, assisted in developing safer burial techniques and improved the triage system for sick patients.

==== Responses of foreign governments ====
- The United States government, through USAID's Office of Foreign Disaster Assistance contributed a payment of $25,000 to non-governmental organisations. This was used for the purchase of protective clothing, plasma, body bags and essential medicines.
- The Swedish government initially sent a team of three observers to Kikwit, to assess the scale of the outbreak and determine if assistance was necessary, on May 15th. Following this, Sweden deployed a team of nine people from the Swedish Rescue Services, who arrived on May 28th. Their responsibilities included improving hospital electricity supplies, improving water supplies and improving sanitation and waste disposal. They also supported the activities of other international organisations. Sweden's response was criticised for leaving numerous projects incomplete and poorly documenting the progress of it's activities by the WHO. This outbreak helped Sweden improve its preparedness for future outbreaks of disease.
- The French Government contributed to the international response by mobilising medical experts and sending equipment to Kikwit, including high-protection gowns, masks, disposable gloves and medicines to Kikwit.
