= Lusanga, Kwilu =

Lusanga
- Location within Democratic Republic of the Congo
- Coordinates: 4.832707°S 18.728256°E
- Country: Democratic Republic of the Congo
- Province: Kwilu
- Territory: Bulungu

Lusanga (formerly Leverville) is a town in Kwilu province of the Democratic Republic of the Congo. It is at the confluence of the Kwenge and Kwilu rivers. The town is served by a small airport (IATA Code: LUS).

In the colonial era the town was called Leverville. It was named after William Lever of the Lever Brothers, which started as a soap-making business and grew into the Unilever consumer goods giant. In 1911 Lever signed a treaty with the Belgian government to gain access to the palm oil of the colony, and established the main coordinating base at Leverville. The Huileries du Congo Belge (HCB), a subsidiary of Lever Brothers, established a large palm oil factory at Leverville, one of three in Kwilu.

== See also ==
- Leverburgh
- Port Sunlight, built for Lever workers.

== Sources ==
- Gurney, Peter (1996). Co-operative culture and the politics of consumption in England, 1870-1930. Manchester University Press ND. ISBN 0-7190-4950-4.
- "Lusanga Airport Information". International Air Charter.
- Nziem, Isidore Ndaywel è (1998). Histoire generale du Congo. De Boeck Supérieur. ISBN 2-8011-1174-0.
- Warrington, C.J. (May 1972). "M'Bwa na Basenji" (PDF). The Basenji.
- Marchal, Jules (2008). Lord Leverhulme's Ghosts: Colonial Exploitation in the Congo. Translated by Martin Thom. Introduced by Adam Hochschild (Abridged English ed.). London: Verso. ISBN 978-1-84467-239-4.
