= Marcellino d'Atri =

Capuchin missionary (1659–1716)

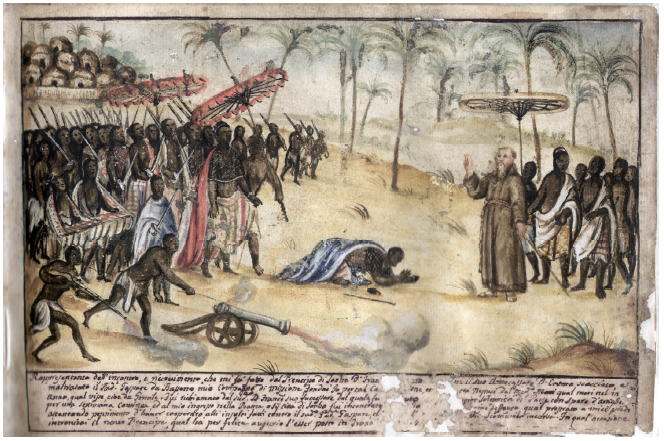
- Reception of a Capuchin missionary by a local ruler in Kongo c. 1740
- Born: Marcellino Canzani; 3 June 1659; Atri, Abruzzo, Kingdom of Naples
- Died: 12 February 1716 (aged 56); Atri, Abruzzo, Kingdom of Naples
- Occupation: Missionary
- Known for: Mission to the Kingdom of Kongo

Marcellino d'Atri (born Marcellino Canzani; 3 June 1659 – 12 February 1716) was a Capuchin missionary from Atri in the Kingdom of Naples who spent several years in the Kingdom of Kongo. His memoirs give much valuable information about the region around the end of the 17th century, although they betray the typical prejudices about Africans of a European at the time.

== Early years ==
Marcellino Canzani was born on 3 June 1659 in Atri, Abruzzo, in the Kingdom of Naples, son of Giuseppe Canzani and Francesca Greco. He received a classical education in the local Jesuit college. He entered the Order of Friars Minor Capuchin on 14 October 1675. He was ordained a priest and at his request was licensed as a missionary on 5 April 1688 after his parents had died. Father Marcellino left Genoa for Lisbon on 7 October 1689, then from Lisbon sailed for the Italian Capuchin mission in the Kingdom of Kongo, in the north of what is now Angola.

== Kingdom of Kongo ==
The Kingdom of Kongo was founded in the 1300s, stretching south from the Congo River over what is now the northwestern part of Angola and the southwestern part of the Democratic Republic of the Congo. The Portuguese reached the kingdom in the 1480s. They did not attempt conquest, but with the king's consent introduced Christianity and engaged in the slave trade, exporting slaves to Brazil. The Capuchin mission, established in 1640, faced many difficulties. The climate was unhealthy to Europeans, the Portuguese claimed the rights of patronage, and the Kingdom of Kongo was in terminal decline. The kingdom had been defeated by the Portuguese in the Battle of Mbwila in 1665, was suffering from the slave trade and was torn by internal conflicts.

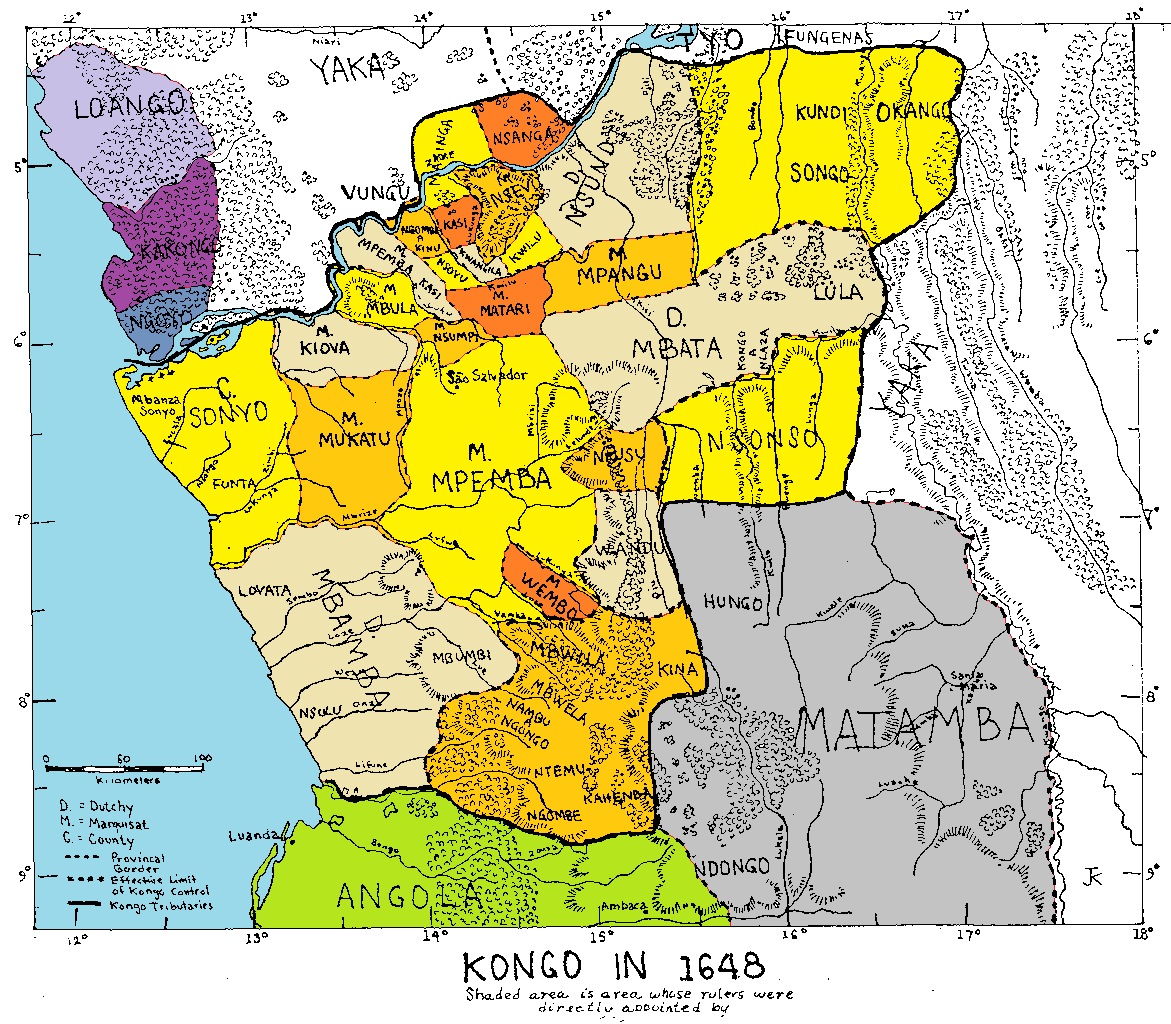
Kingdom of Kongo in 1648

Father Marcellino reached Luanda on 1 August 1690. For the next five years he undertook missionary expeditions punctuated by periods of illness or recuperation. On 25 January 1696 he and Luca da Caltanissetta reached Bambalelo in the Kingdom of Kongo. They travelled extensively through the kingdom, visiting Nsundi, Mpemba, Mpangu, Nkusi, Mbata and Mpumbu. Marcellino d'Atri was present at the coronation of Pedro IV in 1696, a relatively modest ceremony on the site of the former capital of São Salvador. The Portuguese had taken the traditional crown during the 1665 Battle of Mbwila, so the king was wearing a makeshift hat that seemed to have been adapted from a European hat with the royal arms of the Kongo pinned to its front.

In 1698 the missionaries reached the region beyond the Pool Malebo on the Congo River. There they baptized the sovereign, Ngobila, and several hundred of his subjects. They thought he was king of "Mukoko", a kingdom said to extend from Kongo to Abyssinia that did not in fact exist. The Congregation for the Evangelization of Peoples (Propaganda Fide) praised the baptisms and urged Marcellino to continue his missionary work. Between the end of 1698 and 1699 Father Marcellino travelled and preached in the area between Mount Kibangu, Nkusu, Mukondo and Mbwela. The unconverted Kongolese either thought that nobody died, or that when they died they moved on to another world that was much more pleasant than this one. Father Marcellino tried to teach them about Heaven and Hell.

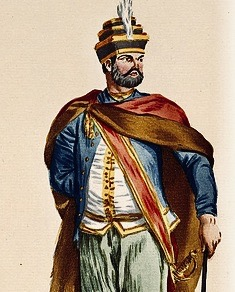
Pedro IV

Father Marcellino attended a ceremony at Kibangu in 1698 where Knights of the Order of Christ accompanied Pedro IV wearing white tunics emblazoned with the red Templar's cross pierced by an arrow, the symbol of their order. During a visit to King Pedro's palace at Kibangu, Father Marcellino was quick to assert the rights of the church. He rejected the quarters offered to him as being inadequate, and instead stayed with a priest from Angola who was there on a commercial trip. The next day Pedro kept the priests waiting a long time before sending a lesser nobleman to conduct them to the court. When Marcellino reached the outer courtyard he stopped and told his escort to tell the king he had arrived and would receive the king there. The escort objected, knowing the king would lose face by coming to the outer courtyard instead of receiving the priest in his inner sanctum. Marcellino insisted, saying this had been done with the Fathers since they first came to the country.

Father Marcellino was appointed head of the Soyo mission, which he reached on 1 June 1702 in very poor health. On 20 November 1702 Luca da Caltanissetta died and Marcellino succeeded him as vice-prefect. He wanted to send a new mission to Ngombela, but was in poor health and could not find missionaries willing to risk a voyage among people they thought to be cannibalistic. Instead he turned over the vice-prefecture to Bernardo da Mazarin and returned to Europe for treatment.

== Return to Europe ==
Father Marcellino left Cabinda on 2 August 1703, and stopped twice in Brazil, where he wrote his memoirs in Portuguese. He reached Lisbon in 1704. He spent a year in the Italian hospice there, then embarked in a Portuguese ship bound for Italy. The French, who were at war with Portugal during the War of the Spanish Succession, captured the ship and held Marcellino in prison in Toulon for seven months. He was released on 1 December 1705 and reached Italy in 1706. In October 1706 he wrote to the Propaganda Fide to ask the Holy See to support Pedro IV in his struggle for recognition as king of Kongo. He left Rome for Naples in December 1706. He saw and described an eruption of Mount Vesuvius on 28 July 1707.

Marcellino reached Abruzzo in October that year, where he spent his time writing his memoirs while waiting for permission to return to Africa, which was always refused because of his recurrent malaria and arthritic pains. Marcellino d'Atri died on 12 February 1716 in the convent of Atri.

== Memoirs ==
Marcellino d'Atri's memoirs were an Italian version of his previous memoirs in Portuguese, which had been lost when his ship was captured on the way to Italy. They give much useful information about the Kongo at that time, although flawed by his lack of understanding of the local cultures. Marcellino wrote an account of a sangamento he had witnessed in 1696. This was a ceremonial martial dance in which the temporal and religious rulers displayed their power and the ordinary people paid homage. He described the political situation and the efforts of the missionaries to help Pedro IV reunify the country. He gave many Kongo language terms, described tropical fruits and medicinal plants, and described the effects of the slave trade. He betrayed typical European prejudice about the African people, who he thought were barbaric, liars, thieves, lustful and ungrateful.

However, Father Marcellino recounted a story he had been told in 1695 by the Kongolese prince Francisco de Menezes Nkanka a Makaya. The prince had been captured by the Portuguese at the Battle of Mbwila and raised in Luanda until he was in his twenties. He told Marcellino he had become too much like the Portuguese, and could never become a king because he would take for himself and not share with others. His people would say "How could we support laws so different from our own, since we are accustomed to eat everything we have in one day, without leaving any for tomorrow?" Marcellino confirmed the truth of what Menezes had said, and that great generosity was considered a high virtue among the Kongolese.

In 1698 Pedro IV gave Marcellino a young woman as a slave. She was the daughter of the king's standard bearer, and had been enslaved to punish her father for losing the royal standard. Marcellino noted that in Africa slaves often served in high positions. They were subject to various limitations, but were not seriously concerned about their status. They were allowed to visit their families and then return to their servitude.

== Sources ==
- Busolini, Dario (2007), "Marcellino d'Atri", Dizionario Biografico degli Italiani (in Italian), vol. 69, Istituto della Enciclopedia Italiana fondata da Giovanni Treccani S.p.A
- Clist, Bernard; Cranshof, Els; Schryver, Gilles-Maurice de; Herremans, Davy; Karklins, Karlis; Matonda, Igor; Steyaert, Fanny; Bostoen, Koen (September 2015), "African-European Contacts in the Kongo Kingdom (Sixteenth-Eighteenth Centuries): New Archaeological Insights from Ngongo Mbata (Lower Congo, DRC)", International Journal of Historical Archaeology, 19 (3), Springer: 464–501, doi:10.1007/s10761-015-0296-3, hdl:1854/LU-5704437, JSTOR 24572800, S2CID 55750316
- Drescher, Seymour; Emmer, Pieter C.; Marques, João Pedro (2010), Who Abolished Slavery?: Slave Revolts and Abolitionism a Debate with Joâo Pedro Marques, Berghahn Books, ISBN 9781845458010
- Fromont, Cécile (2011), "Dance, Image, Myth, and Conversion in the Kingdom of Kongo, 1500–1800", African Arts, 44 (4 Winter), UCLA James S. Coleman African Studies Center: 52–63, doi:10.1162/afar.2011.44.4.52, JSTOR 41330741, S2CID 57565211
- Fromont, Cécile (2017), "Tecido estrangeiro, hábitos locais: indumentária, insígnias Reais e a arte da conversão no início da Era Moderna do Reino do Congo", Anais do Museu Paulista: História e Cultura Material, 25 (2), University of Chicago: 11–31, doi:10.1590/1982-02672017v25n02d01-2
- Heywood, Linda M. (2009), "Slavery and Its Transformation in the Kingdom of Kongo: 1491–1800", The Journal of African History, 50: 1–22, doi:10.1017/S0021853709004228, S2CID 154942266
- Thornton, John K. (1993), "'I Am the Subject of the King of Congo': African Political Ideology and the Haitian Revolution", Journal of World History, 4 (2 Fall), University of Hawai'i Press on behalf of World History Association: 181–214, JSTOR 20078560
- Thornton, John (1998), The Kongolese Saint Anthony: Dona Beatriz Kimpa Vita and the Antonian Movement, 1684–1706, Cambridge University Press, ISBN 9780521596497
