= Kwilu River =

River in Democratic Republic of the Congo

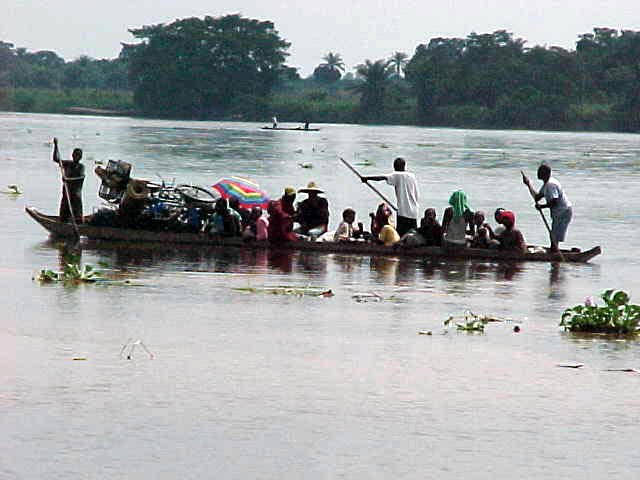
- May, 2003 - Villagers crossing the Kwilu river

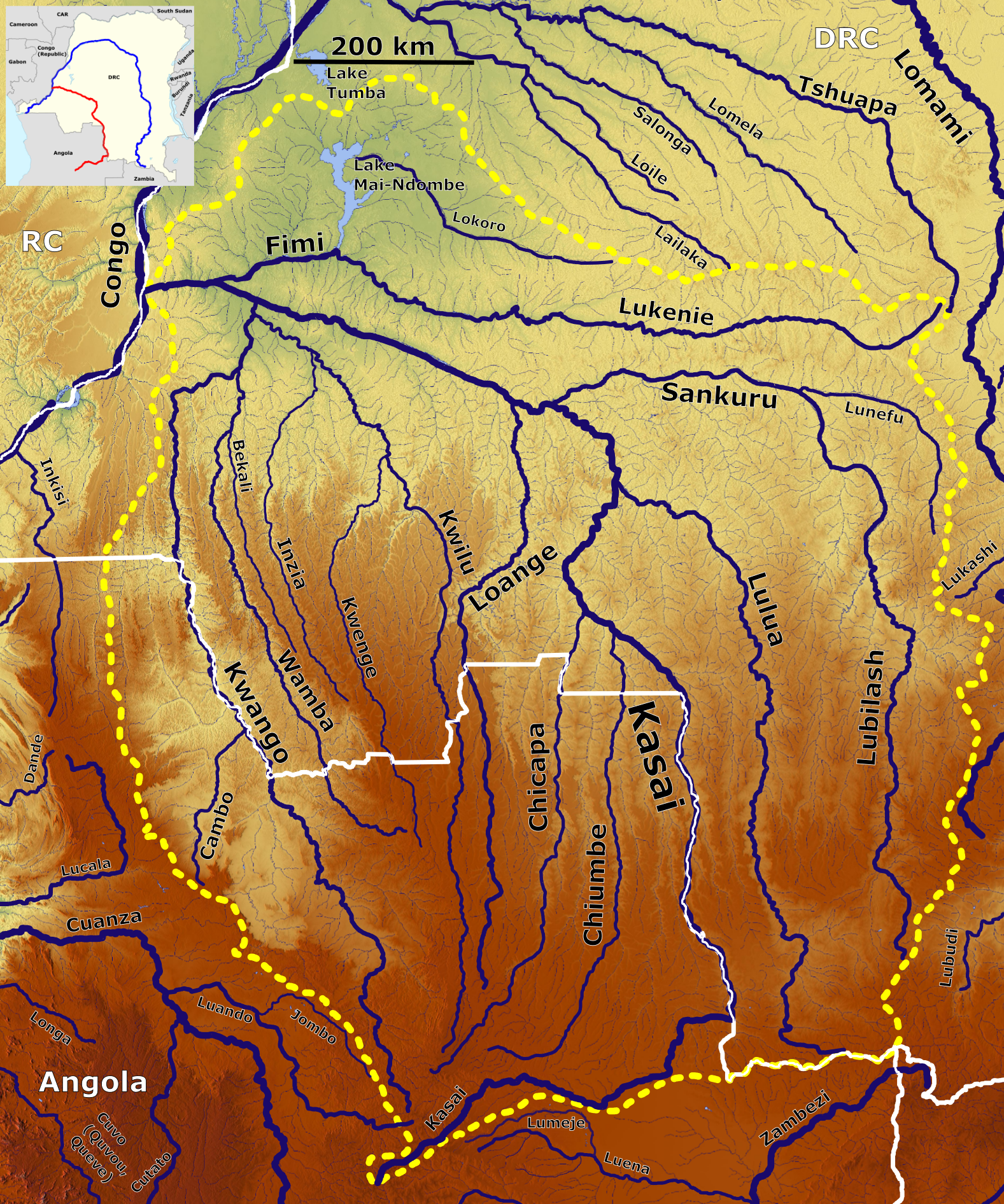
- The Kwilu River in the Kasai catchment (center)

Location
- Countries: Angola; Democratic Republic of the Congo

Physical characteristics
- Mouth
  - coordinates: 3°23′07″S 17°23′04″E
- Length: 965 km (600 mi)

Basin features
- River system: Kasaï River

The Kwilu River (Portuguese: Rio Cuílo; French: Rivière Kwilu; Dutch: Kwilu Rivier) is a major river in both Lunda Norte Province and Lunda Sul Province in Angola as well as Kwilu Province, formerly known as Bandundu province, in the Democratic Republic of the Congo (DRC) to the city of Bandundu, where it joins the Kwango River just before this stream enters the Kasai River. In the DRC the river flows past the towns of Gungu, Kikwit, Bulungu, Bagata, Rutherfordia and Bandundu. Lusanga, formerly Leverville, lies at the location where the Kwenge River joins the Kwilu, between Kikwit and Bulungu.

== Characteristics ==
It is a meandering river. Near its mouth it is 950 meters wide. The bed material is sand. The river is about 965 kilometres (600 mi) long. In the wet season the flooded area covers 1,550 square kilometres (600 sq mi). The headwaters of the river rise at elevations between 1,000 metres (3,300 ft) and 1,800 metres (5,900 ft) in the Angolan highlands. They drop steeply to the flat central Congo Basin at between 500 metres (1,600 ft) and 300 metres (980 ft) above sea level. A 2011 survey found 113 species of fish in 21 families and eight orders.

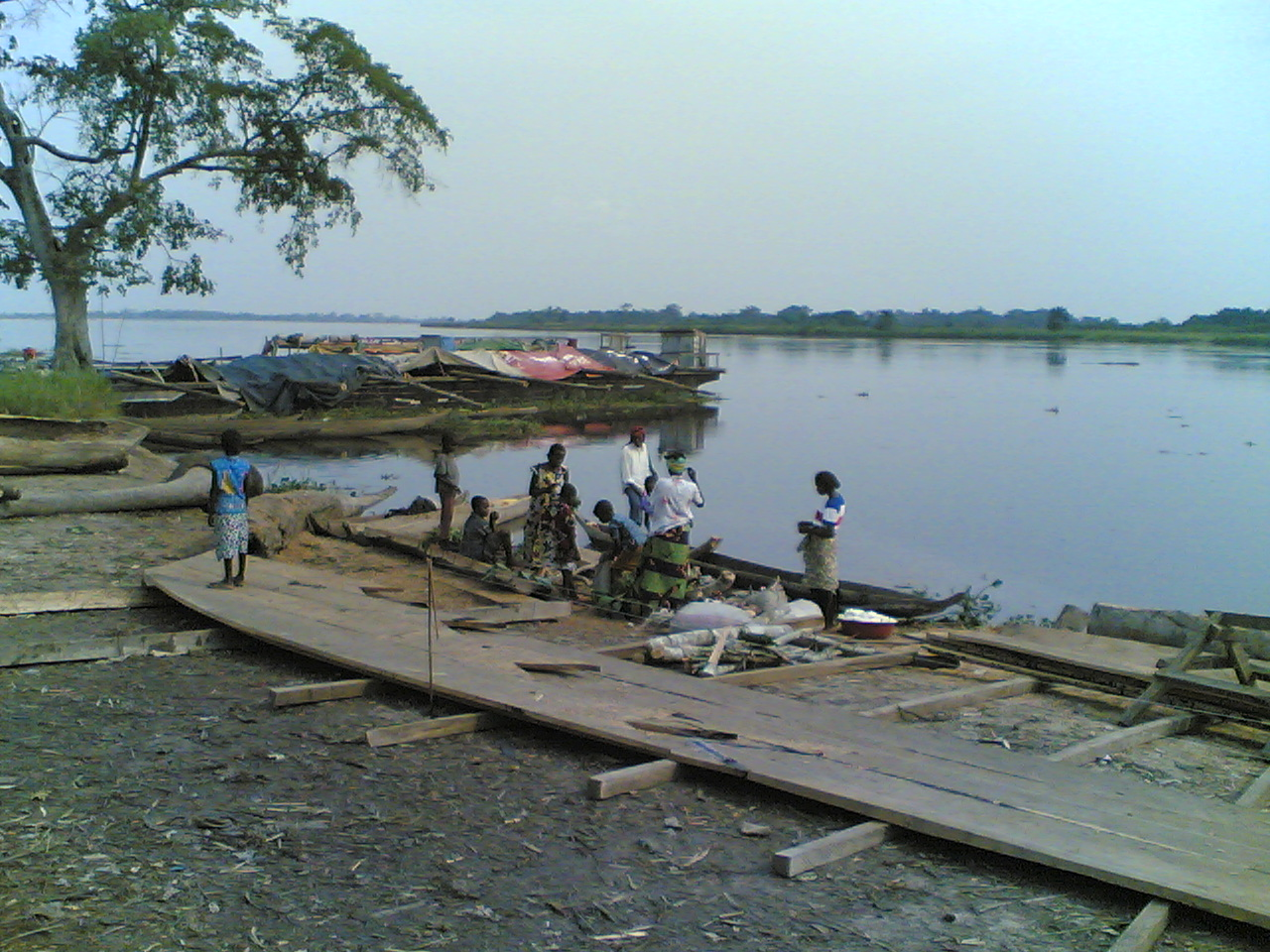
Beside the river at Bandundu, June 2007

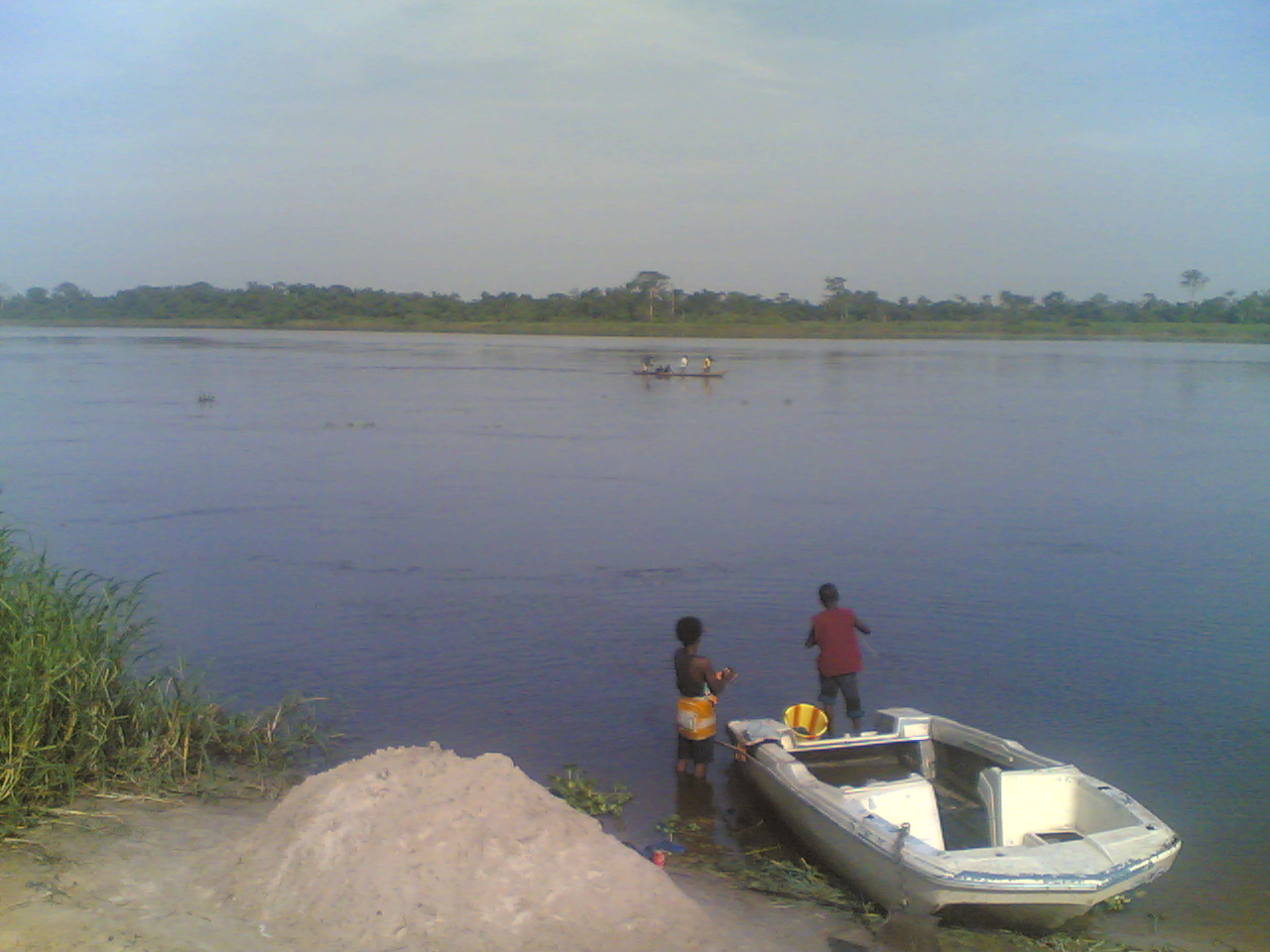
The river at Bandundu, June 2007

== Sources ==
- Blaes, X. (October 2008). "Découpage administratif de la République Démocratique du Congo" (PDF). UNOCHA and PNUD. Archived from the original (PDF) on 2016-08-18.
- Munene, José Justin Mbimbi Mayi; Stiassny, Melanie L. J. (2011). "Fishes of the Kwilu River (Kasai basin, central Africa): A list of species collected in the vicinity of Kikwit, Bandundu Province, Democratic Republic of Congo". Check List. 7 (5): 691. doi:10.15560/7.5.691.
