= Goma =

Goma Mji wa Goma (Swahili)
- Provincial capital and city
- Ville de Goma
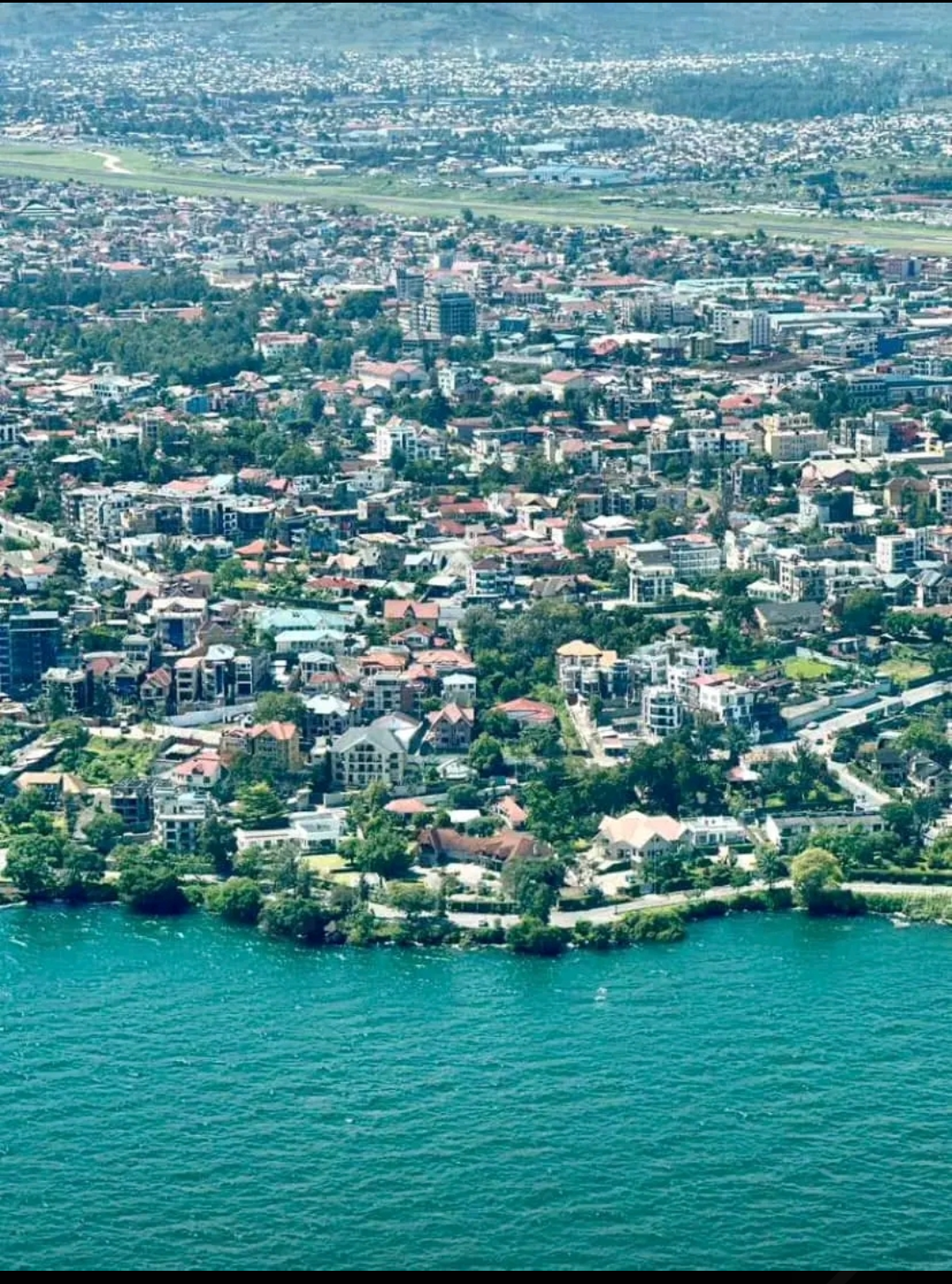
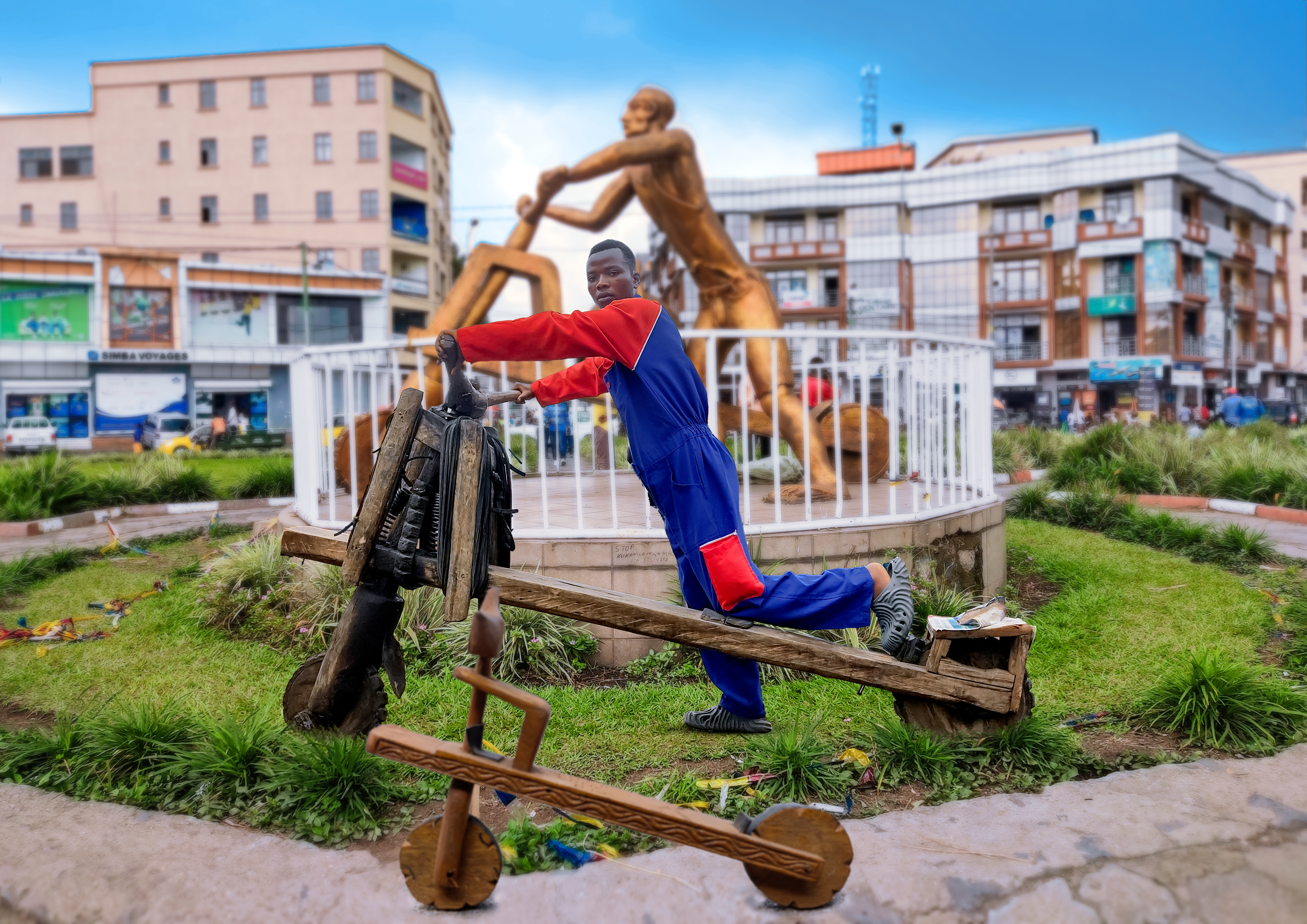
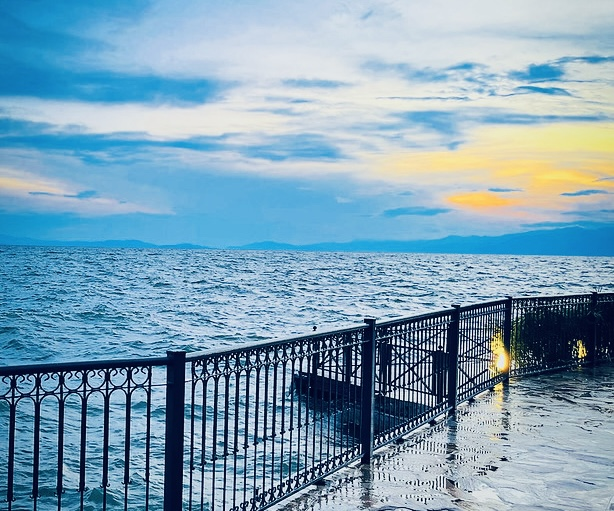
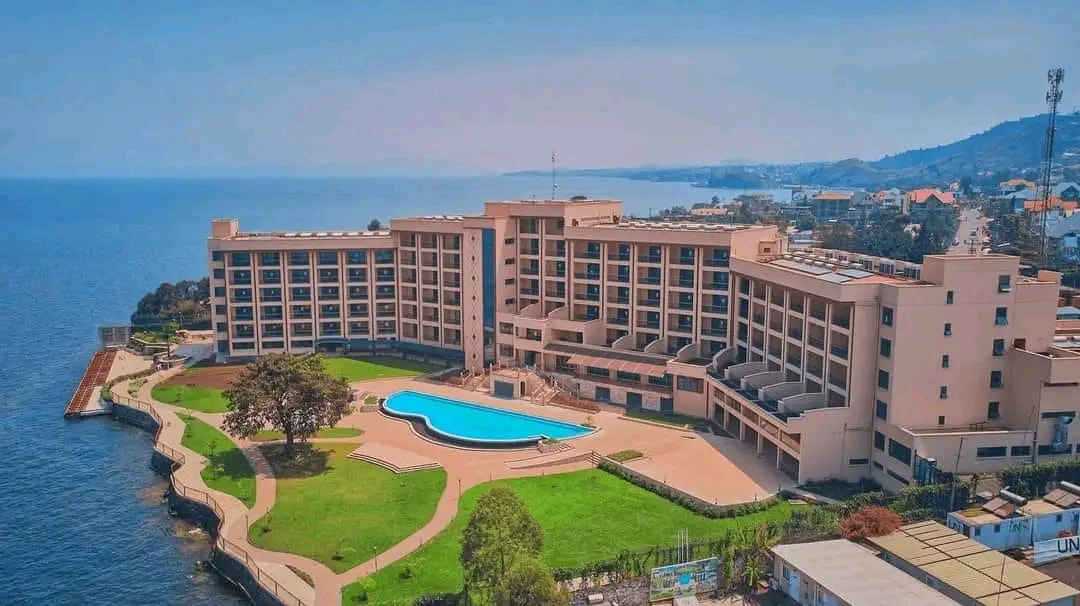
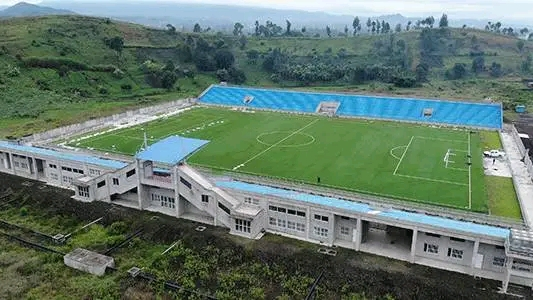
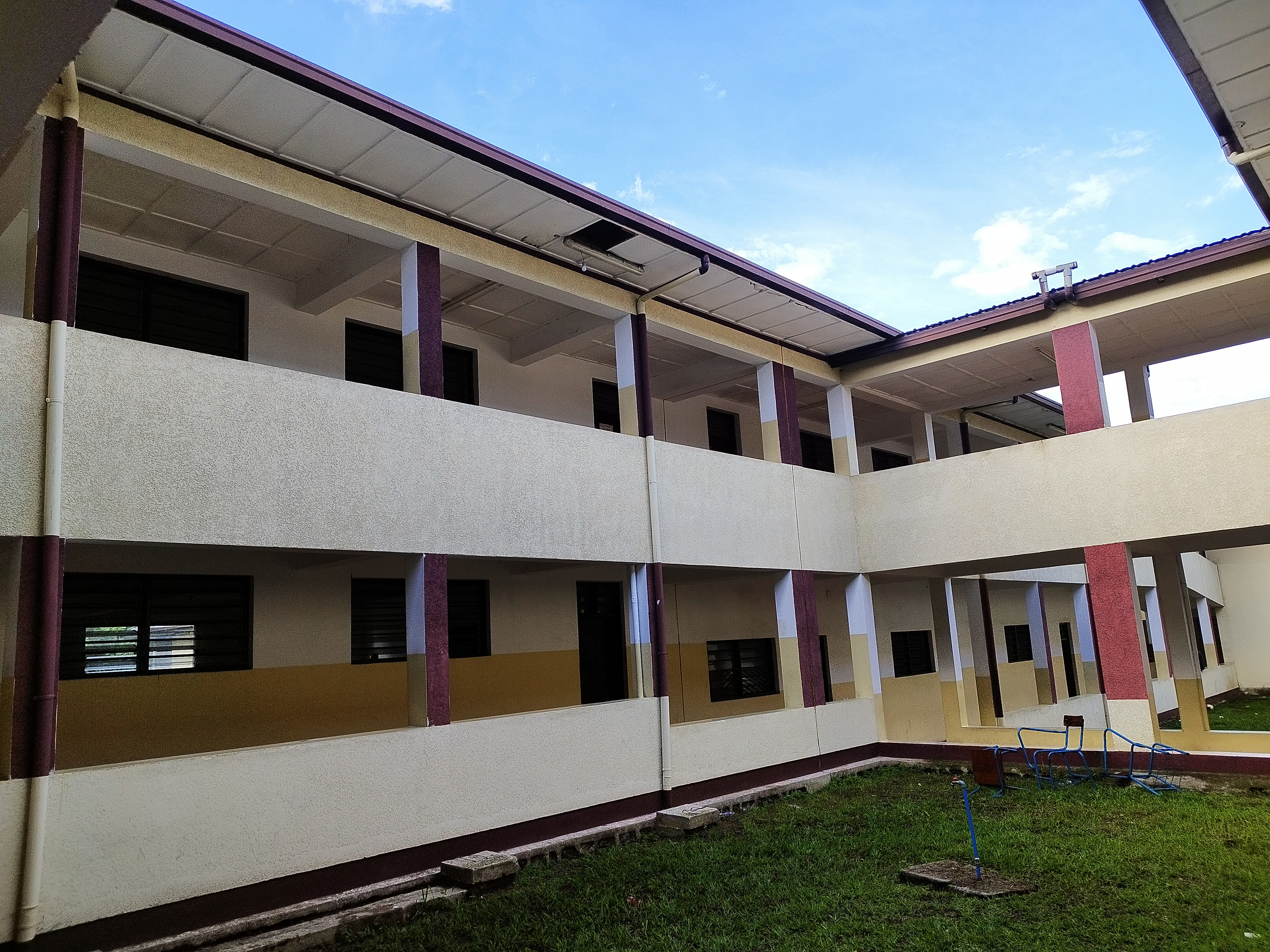
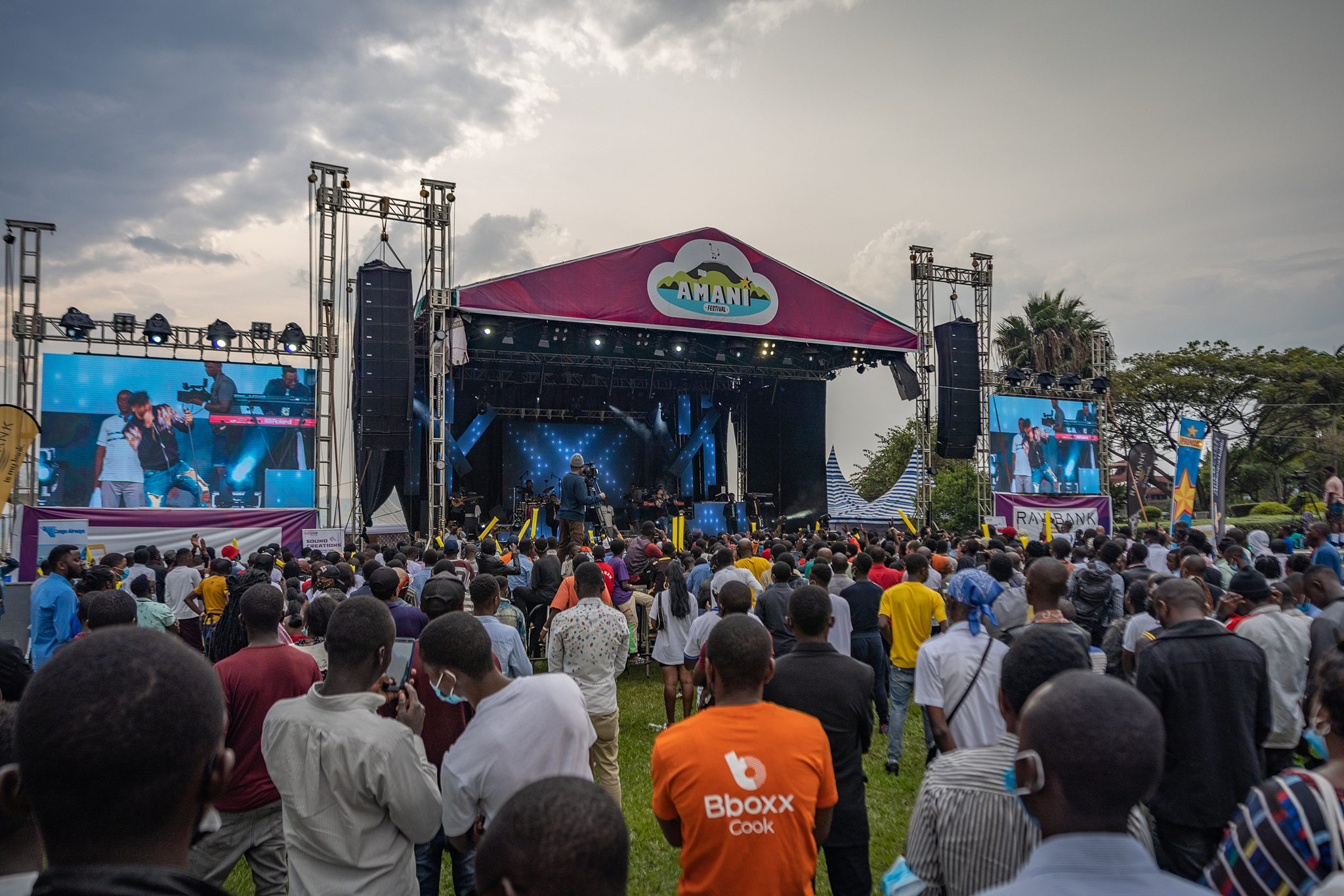
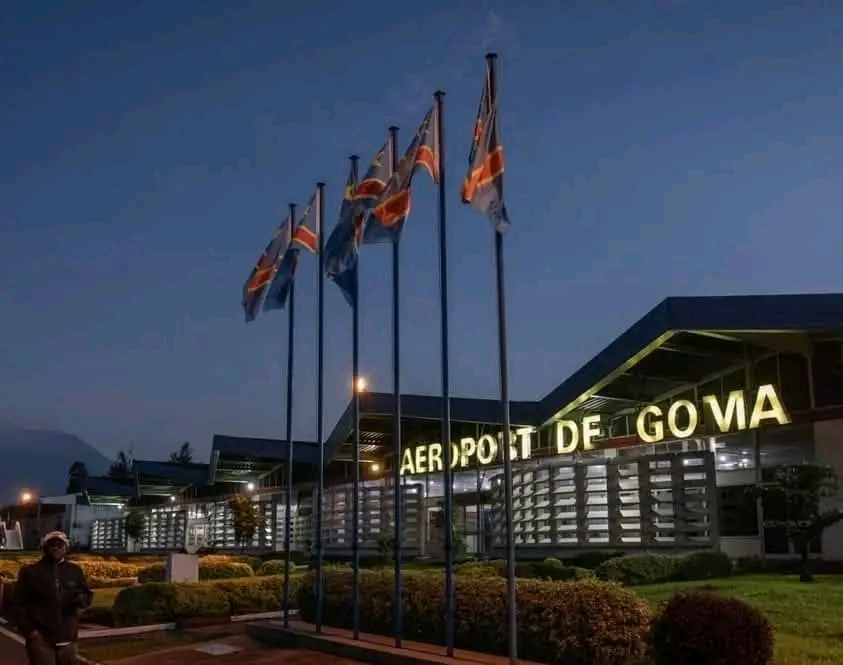
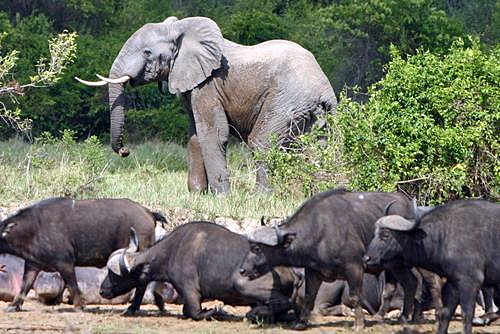
- View over Goma Rond-Point Tcukudu Lake Kivu Goma Serena Hotel Stade de Mugunga Free University of the Great Lakes Countries Foyer Culturel de Goma Goma International Airport Virunga National Park
- Interactive map of Goma
- Location within Democratic Republic of the Congo
- Coordinates: 01°40′46″S 29°14′01″E
- Country: DR Congo
- Province: North Kivu
- Communes: Goma, Karisimbi

Government
  - Mayor: Faustin Kapend Kamand

Area
  - City: 75.72 km^{2} (29.24 sq mi)
- Elevation: 1,460 m (4,790 ft)

Population (2024)
  - Metro: 782,000
  - Ethnicities: Banande; Bahunde; Banyanga; Batembo; Bambuba; Balese; Batalinga; Bapere; Bakano; Bakusu; Bakumu; Batwa (pygmies); Banyarwanda
- Time zone: UTC+2 (CAT)
- National language: Swahili
- Climate: Aw

Goma is the capital and largest city of the North Kivu province of the Democratic Republic of the Congo. It is located in the east of the country on the northern shore of Lake Kivu and shares borders with the Bukumu Chiefdom to the north, Rwanda to the east and the Masisi Territory to the west. The city lies in the Albertine Rift, the western branch of the East African Rift, and is only 13–18 km (8.1–11.2 mi) south of the active volcano Mount Nyiragongo. With an approximate area of 75.72 km^{2} (29.24 sq mi), the city had a population of 782,000 people in 2024, with an additional 500,000 displaced people.

Goma is administratively divided into two communes: Goma and Karisimbi, which are further subdivided into 18 quarters. The city is home to several notable landmarks, including Goma International Airport, the UNESCO World Heritage Site Virunga National Park, the private Christian co-educational school Adventist University of Goma, the University of Goma, and is surrounded by the active Virunga volcanic range, which includes volcanoes Nyamulagira, Nyiragongo, Mikeno, Visoke, Gahinga, Karisimbi, and Sabinyo. Goma hosts the annual Amani Festival, the Free University of the Great Lakes Countries, which supports local development initiatives, and the regional cultural center and art school, Foyer Culturel de Goma.

The recent history of Goma has been dominated by the volcano and the Rwandan genocide of 1994, which fueled the First and Second Congo Wars. In late 2012, the city was captured briefly by rebels of the March 23 Movement during the M23 rebellion and then retaken by Congolese government forces, only to be captured by the AFC/M23 alliance again in January 2025, following a fresh offensive by the group that culminated in the Battle of Goma.

== Etymology ==
The name Goma derived from a modification of ngoma, the city's former designation, a term of profound cultural and linguistic relevance among Bantu-speaking communities throughout Central, Southern, and East Africa. Ngoma is translated as "drum", and is commonly associated with ritual dances and ceremonies in these regions.

This etymological link is believed to allude to the resonant, drum-like sounds emitted during a volcanic eruption that altered the area's historical topography. The eruption led to the destruction of the original village, prompting its inhabitants to disperse and establish three new villages: Ngoma, which evolved into modern Goma; Matcha, contemporary Sake; and Munti, which is now known as Munigi groupement of Bukumu Chiefdom.

Residents of Goma are sometimes referred to as Gomatraciens, though this term is seldom used locally. The suffix "-tracien" has scientific connotation classifications, often associated with the taxonomy of animal species, particularly amphibians, which has led to its perception as artificial and unsuitable for describing human inhabitants. Instead, the term Goméen is favored for its more humanistic and natural connotation.

== Geography ==
Goma is the largest and capital city of the North Kivu Province in eastern Democratic Republic of the Congo. To Goma's north lies Nyiragongo Territory, the Republic of Rwanda to the east, Lake Kivu to the south, and Masisi Territory to the west. Goma is strategically located on the Goma plain, which is composed of volcanic lavas and gradual slopes gently towards Lake Kivu.

The plain is bordered by the Virunga Mountains to the west, which comprises prominent peaks such as Nyamuragira, Mount Nyiragongo, Mount Mikeno, Mount Bisoke, Mount Gahinga, Mount Karisimbi and Mount Sabyinyo. Elevations in the northern part of the plain range from 1,640 to 2,000 m (5,380 to 6,560 ft), with the volcanic fields of Nyamuragira and Nyiragongo exhibiting continuous carbon dioxide degassing. Nyiragongo, in particular, has been active since the early 1900s, featuring an active lava lake and periodic eruptions, including notable events in 1977, 2002, and 2021.

The predominant terrain of Goma is volcanic, with only a small portion consisting of slightly sandy soil. The surface is covered with basalt flows, creating a skeletal soil profile. Hills such as Mount Goma, Mount Ndosho, Mount Mugunga, and Mount Busara punctuate the landscape, although some areas are relatively flat. Mount Goma, an extinct volcano, lies at the public port of Goma. This hill was formed during ancient volcanic eruptions and marks the southeastern limit of the plain.

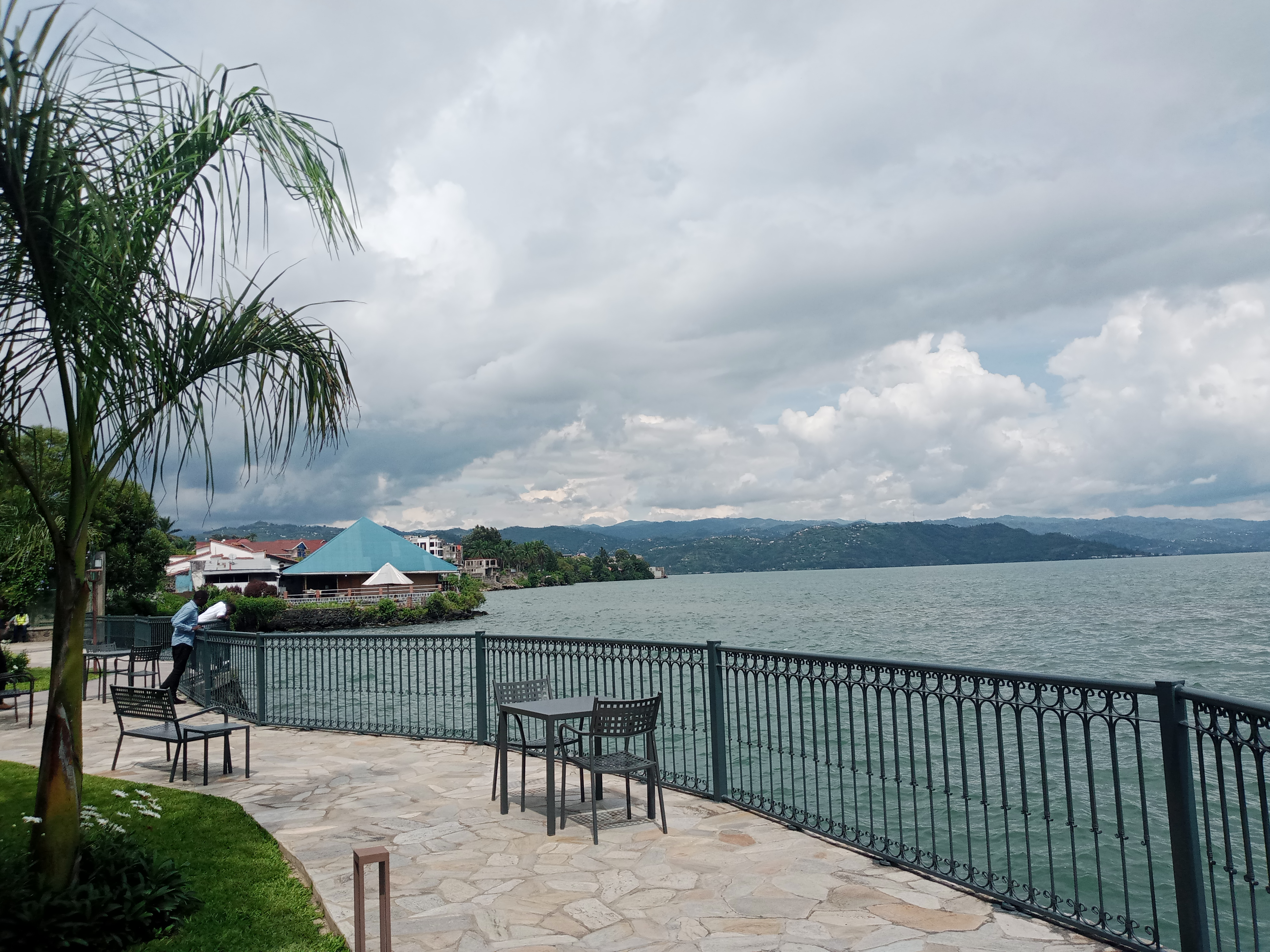
The waterfront on the banks of Lake Kivu in Goma

The vegetation in Goma is predominantly savannah interspersed with bushes. The city's aesthetic appeal is further enhanced by artificial greenery, including trees planted by landowners, which mitigates temperature fluctuations. Hydrographically, Goma benefits from its southern proximity to Lake Kivu and smaller lakes such as Green Lake in Mugunga and Black Lake in Buhimba to the west.

=== Climate ===
The Köppen-Geiger climate classification system classifies Goma's climate as a tropical savanna climate (Aw). Goma is much milder than most climates of its latitude due to the city's high altitude, and sees warm days and pleasant nights year-round.

Climate data for Goma
Month	Jan	Feb	Mar	Apr	May	Jun	Jul	Aug	Sep	Oct	Nov	Dec	Year
Mean daily maximum °C (°F)	25.6 (78.1)	25.7 (78.3)	25.7 (78.3)	25.4 (77.7)	25.3 (77.5)	25.3 (77.5)	25.2 (77.4)	25.8 (78.4)	25.9 (78.6)	25.7 (78.3)	25.3 (77.5)	25.4 (77.7)	25.5 (77.9)
Daily mean °C (°F)	20.0 (68.0)	20.1 (68.2)	20.1 (68.2)	20.0 (68.0)	19.9 (67.8)	19.4 (66.9)	19.7 (67.5)	19.8 (67.6)	19.8 (67.6)	19.9 (67.8)	19.7 (67.5)	19.9 (67.8)	19.9 (67.7)
Mean daily minimum °C (°F)	14.4 (57.9)	14.6 (58.3)	14.6 (58.3)	14.7 (58.5)	14.6 (58.3)	13.6 (56.5)	13.1 (55.6)	13.9 (57.0)	14.0 (57.2)	14.2 (57.6)	14.1 (57.4)	14.4 (57.9)	14.2 (57.5)
Average rainfall mm (inches)	94 (3.7)	84 (3.3)	117 (4.6)	119 (4.7)	108 (4.3)	55 (2.2)	29 (1.1)	70 (2.8)	117 (4.6)	143 (5.6)	138 (5.4)	118 (4.6)	1,192 (46.9)
Average rainy days	16	16	19	22	18	8	6	8	15	20	22	19	189
Mean daily sunshine hours	5	5	5	5	5	6	7	5	5	5	5	5	5
Source 1: Climate-Data.org, altitude: 1,531 metres or 5,023 feet
Source 2: Weather2Travel for rainy days and sunshine

=== Administrative division ===
Goma is administered by a mayor, who is assisted by a deputy mayor responsible for overseeing the commune mayors (bourgmestres). The bourgmestres then supervise the quarter chiefs (chefs de quartiers). Each quartier is then subdivided into avenues, cells, and Nyumba Kumi (literally, "ten houses"), a system in which ten households are overseen by a person appointed by the quartier chief. Introduced in 1997 by the Alliance of Democratic Forces for the Liberation of Congo-Zaire (AFDL), the Nyumba Kumi system was modelled on Rwanda's local governance system.

The city is divided into two communes: Goma and Karisimbi, which are then subdivided into 18 quartiers.

Communes	Quartiers
Goma	Les Volcanoes; Mikeno; Mapendo; Katindo; Himbi; Kyeshero; Lac Vert
Karisimbi	Kahembe; Katoyi; Majengo; Mabanga-Nord; Mabanga-Sud; Kasika; Murara; Virunga; Ndosho; Mugunga; Bujovu

The creation of these 18 quarters was intended to address overcrowding. On 11 November 1998, the governor of North Kivu signed Order No. 01/085/CAB/GP-NK/98, which established quarters in the city. It divided Katoyi into Kasika and Katoyi, and Mabanga into Mabanga-Nord and Mabanga-Sud.

A subsequent order, No. 10/037/CAB/GP-NK/98, established Bujovu quarter in the Karisimbi commune. Bujovu included the Byahi and Tyazo cells, formerly part of Majengo and Virunga quarters, respectively.

== History ==
The village of Ngoma was a port for lake traffic and a crossroads for the overland trade routes between Central Africa and the Indian Ocean. In 1894, the explorer Gustav Adolf von Götzen, following the footsteps of an earlier missionary, was traveling to Rwanda from the eastern coast of Africa and passed through the village, which he recorded as Goma. In 1906, officers of the Congo Free State established Goma post opposite Gisenyi as a military outpost to oversee maritime activities on Lake Kivu, which later transformed into a civil status office. Around 1930, the Goma precinct accommodated camps for laborers of the Eastern Railway (CFE), initially sited along Lake Kivu's eastern shores. By the mid-20th century, Goma had become an essential hub, and served as the endpoint of the Vici Congo road network and a port for the transshipment of agricultural commodities and building materials to and from Bukavu. In 1945, it burgeoned into a state post under Rutshuru Territory's jurisdiction, experiencing a rapid demographic upsurge with approximately 8,600 inhabitants. Goma's prominence as a city grew steadily and earned it the status of an extra-customary center that year. Educational infrastructure developed in tandem, with institutions such as the "École Royale" (now the Goma Institute or INSTIGO) and the École Primaire d'Application de l'institut de Goma (EPAIGO) catering to European settlers. Meanwhile, the native population relied on the Saint André School, later renamed Kyeshero Primary School, for primary education.

The inception of urbanization in Belgian Congo was formalized with the promulgation of a decree on 21 February 1949, which instituted entities responsible for evaluating and issuing building permits, overseeing demolitions, modifying land plots, and making changes to the urban landscape. In 1951, Goma was elevated to the territorial and capital level of North Kivu. This period also witnessed movements advocating for administrative separation between Goma and Rutshuru, leading to the establishment of deliberative and executive bodies in Kirotshe and later in Sake.

The urban sprawl of Goma adhered to the archetypal colonial planning paradigm with the demarcation of separate neighborhoods for Europeans (cité Européenne) and indigenous Congolese (cité indigène). The latter was limited to contemporary Birere, a densely populated quartier abutting the Rwandan border. Meanwhile, the quartiers allocated for European settlers were concentrated within the contemporary city center (quartier les Volcans) and an enclave of the Himbi quartier, which persists as the most urbanized, affluent, and wealthy parts of the city.

On 25 December 1966, North Kivu regained its district status before becoming a region following the constitutional referendum of June 1967. By 10 July 1988, North Kivu attained its regional autonomy, promulgating its status as a sovereign entity within the tripartite division of the Kivu region into provinces: North Kivu, South Kivu, and Maniema. A decree issued on 14 September 1988, outlined critical urban development guidelines, such as construction alignments, the delineation of housing plans and communication routes, and the segregation of sustainable residential districts from native-dominated huts. This marked the onset of a segregationist urban paradigm, in which Congolese cities became characterized by a dichotomy between modern urban centers and native settlements. As a result of Goma's burgeoning urbanization, the city was officially designated as the provincial capital of the newly established North Kivu province under Ordinance Law No. 88-178, issued on 15 November 1988.

=== 1994 Hutu refugee crisis ===
The 1994 Rwandan genocide was executed by the interim Rwandan government against the Tutsi population and Hutu moderates. In response, the Rwandan Patriotic Front (RPF), formed by Tutsi refugees from Uganda, who already held control over significant portions of northern Rwanda after their invasion in 1990 and the ongoing Civil War, overthrew the Hutu government in Kigali, forcing them out. Over two million Hutus fled the country to Zaire and many Tutsis and Hutus were internally displaced within Rwanda. Although Hutu extremists were responsible for the mass killing of Tutsis, scholars like Judi Rever and Filip Reyntjens argue that the main perpetrators of the slaughter were the Tutsi-dominated RPF, led by Paul Kagame. According to Judi Rever, Kagame personally commanded massacres at places like Byumba soccer stadium in northern Rwanda and ordered the pursuit of Hutus in the Zairean forests. They devised ways to dispose of large numbers of bodies by "dissolving them in acid, dumping them in rivers and swamps, or burning them, and established open air crematorium". Various UN missions attempted to establish safe zones and facilitate the movement of refugees. Between 13 June and 14 July 1994, an overwhelming number of refugees, ranging from 10,000 to 12,000 per day, fled across the border to Goma, resulting in a severe humanitarian crisis, as there was an acute lack of shelter, food and water. However, the Zairean government took it upon itself to garner attention for the situation. Shortly after the arrival of nearly one million refugees, a deadly cholera outbreak swept through the Hutu refugee camps near Goma, claiming thousands of lives. RPF-aligned forces, which had fought in the conflict, crossed the border to Zaire and in acts of revenge also claimed several lives

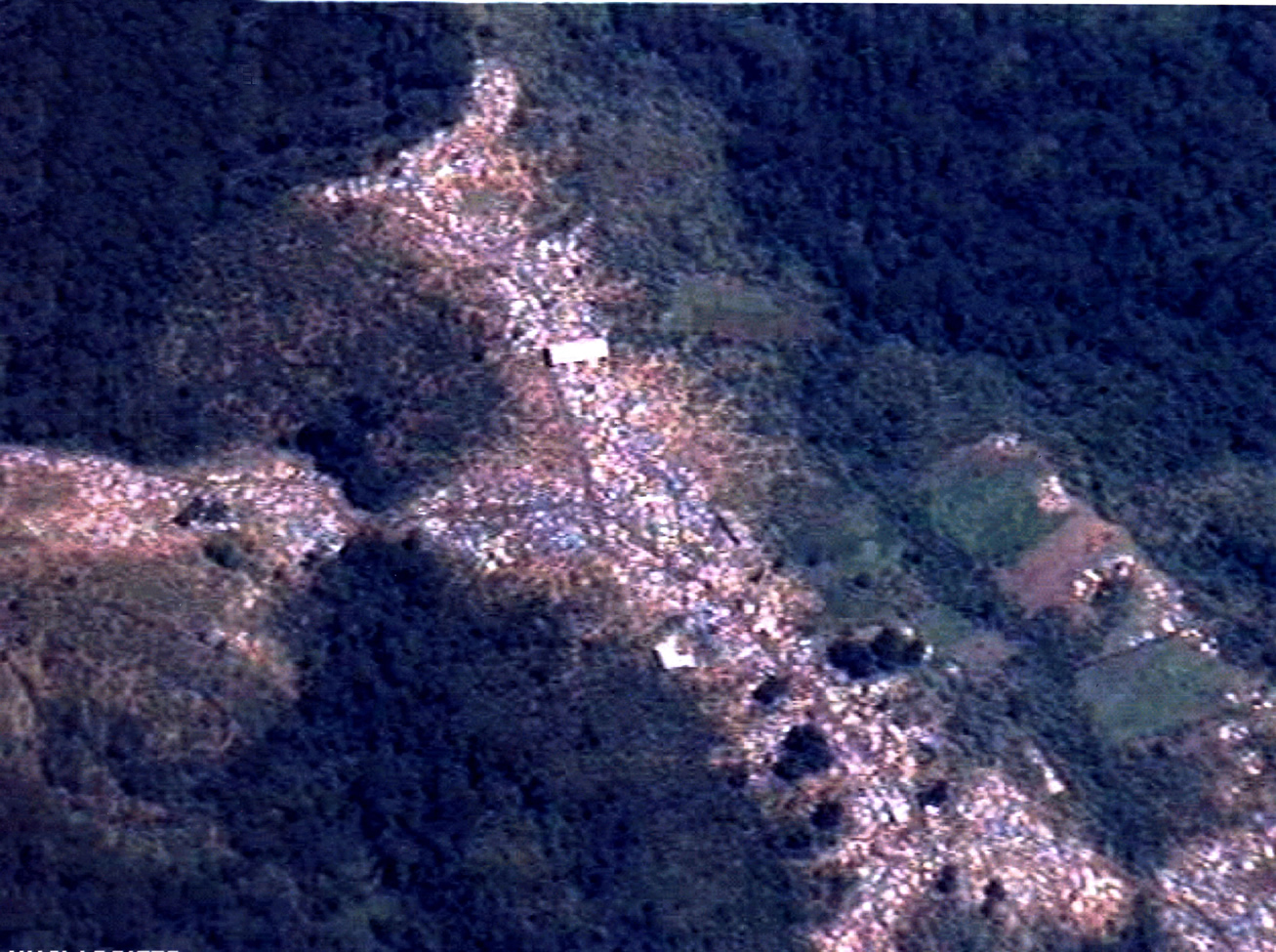
Aerial photograph of the Mihanda refugee camp

=== First Congo War ===
As early as mid-1996, infiltrated units from Rwanda began targeting Hutu refugee camps along the Rutshuru road, even before formal hostilities began. On the evening of 27 June 1996, an infiltrated group allegedly carried out an attack on the Kibumba refugee camp, resulting in casualties among Hutu refugees, soldiers from the Contingent Zaïrois pour la sécurité des camps (CZSC), and Red Cross personnel.

During the First Congo War, from mid-October 1996, Rwandan infiltrations intensified, accompanied by sporadic attacks on refugee camps along the Goma to Rutshuru road by the newly formed Alliance of Democratic Forces for the Liberation of Congo (AFDL), a rebel movement led by Laurent-Désiré Kabila, and Rwandan Patriotic Army (RPA) led by Paul Kagame, who aimed to overthrow Mobutu Sese Seko's regime, accusing him of excluding Tutsis from governance and failing to stop the génocidaires. However, the United Nations Security Council noted that both the RPA and AFDL pillaged Zaire's minerals for nearly two and a half decades and conducted massacres throughout the conflict. The Kibumba camp, situated twenty-five kilometers north of Goma, was the first to fall under assault. On the night of 25–26 October 1996, AFDL and RPA soldiers bombarded the Kibumba camp, resulting in casualties among Hutu refugees and the destruction of the camp's hospital. Subsequently, approximately 194,000 refugees fled Kibumba towards the Mugunga camp. The Katale camp also faced attacks on the same night, but Forces Armées Zaïroises (FAZ)/CZSC soldiers and ex-FAR/Interahamwe units repelled the assailants initially. However, on 26 October 1996, AFDL and RPA forces attacked the Katale camp, resulting in numerous Hutu refugee casualties and the death of a Zairian soldier. They also allegedly killed several Hutu refugees using bladed weapons. Following confrontations with FAZ soldiers and ex-FAR/Interahamwe units from the Katale camp, who offered reinforcement, AFDL and RPA forces seized control of the FAZ military camp at Rumangabo.

By 30 October, refugees from Katale and Kahindo camps began to depart, with some heading towards Masisi via Tongo groupement of Bwito Chiefdom, while others attempted to reach the Mugunga camp through the Virunga National Park. However, AFDL and RPA troops had blocked the road to Goma, complicating the refugees' escape routes. On 31 October 1996, AFDL and RPA soldiers allegedly massacred hundreds of Hutu refugees who remained in the Kahindo and Katale camps. Roberto Garretón, the Special Rapporteur on the violation of human rights in Zaire, estimated the casualties and highlighted the brutality inflicted on the refugees.

In the aftermath of AFDL/RPA offensives in North Kivu, some refugees opted to return to Rwanda, though their numbers remained small. UNHCR reported approximately 900 Hutu refugees returning to Rwanda between 26 October and 31 October 1996. The reluctance of many refugees to return stemmed from both physical and psychological pressures, including fear of reprisals from AFDL/RPA soldiers. There were reports of AFDL/RPA soldiers killing refugees who expressed a desire to return to Rwanda. Determining the exact number of refugees killed by AFDL/RPA soldiers in attacks along the Goma to Rutshuru road was challenging. However, local NGOs involved in burial operations provided insights into the scale of the atrocities. The United Nations Mapping Report team documented numerous alleged incidents, including mass burials and killings in and around refugee camps between November 1996 and April 1997. The violence extended beyond the dismantling of refugee camps; Hutu survivors faced persecution while attempting to flee. In November 1996, AFDL/RPA soldiers reportedly targeted Hutu survivors from Kahindo and Katale camps, executing adult males. These survivors, along with others who resettled in makeshift camps, were subjected to further attacks in the Virunga National Park, resulting in additional casualties. The atrocities persisted for several months, with killings reported well into 1997. Witness testimonies highlighted the grim reality faced by refugees, with bodies discovered daily in former camp sites. On 11 April 1997, AFDL/RPA soldiers allegedly massacred hundreds of refugees near Kibumba village. These refugees, intercepted while attempting to return to Rwanda, were detained and subsequently killed by AFDL/RPA forces.

By the end of 1997, AFDL rebels advanced to Kinshasa, driving out Mobutu and leading to Laurent-Désiré Kabila proclaiming himself president on 17 May, renaming the country the Democratic Republic of the Congo (DRC).

=== Second Congo War ===
Within a year of assuming power, Laurent-Désiré Kabila found himself in conflict with his former allies, and in 1998, the Rwandan government threw its support behind a Goma-based rebel movement known as the Congolese Rally for Democracy (RCD), occasionally denoted as RCD-Goma. The Goma refugee encampments, where Hutu refugees and Interahamwe militants had forged a militia known as the Democratic Force for the Liberation of Rwanda (FDLR), morphed into battlegrounds as Rwandan government forces and the RCD clashed with them to assert dominion.

On 2 August 1998, General Sylvain Buki announced via Radio-Télévision Nationale Congolaise (RTNC) in Goma that a rebellion had erupted within the Congolese Armed Forces (FAC). The 10th Brigade of the FAC mutinied, leading to the swift capture of Goma by the RCD and Rwandan Patriotic Army (RPA), with minimal resistance. Goma remained beyond the reach of the Kinshasa government's forces for nearly three years, save for sporadic barrage. Amidst these conflicts, the RCD's bias towards the local Tutsi community, Rwandan interference in provincial affairs, and the brutality of RCD and RPA troops towards civilians in North Kivu prompted many locals to join Mayi–Mayi armed groups to defend their communities. The Mayi–Mayi militias utilized forested areas and national parks as bases for launching attacks against RCD and RPA forces.

With support from Kinshasa, the Mayi–Mayi and ALiR intensified ambushes and pillaging against RCD/RPA soldiers and civilian populations. Consequently, RCD/RPA control was limited to certain urban areas. In response, they increased search operations in various regions. The Second Congo War was unprecedented in Africa for the loss of civilian life in massacres and atrocities. By 2003, the Rwandan Banyamulenge-supported insurgent factions wearied of the conflict, and discord surfaced between them and Rwanda. In 2002 and 2003, a tenuous negotiated peace ensued among the myriad factions embroiled in the conflict.

=== Ongoing conflict, 2002-present ===
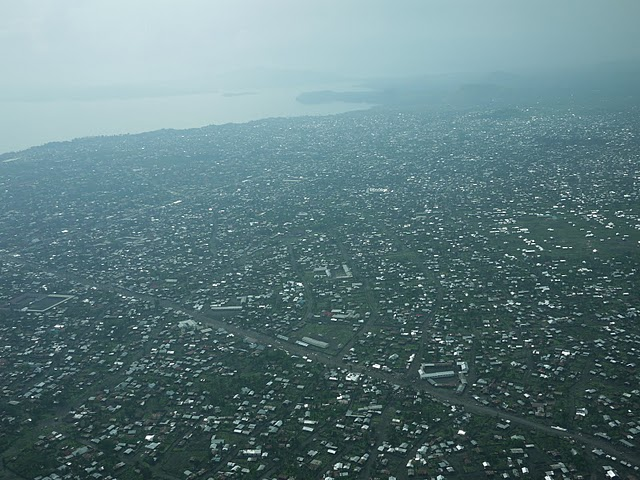
Aerial view of Goma in October 2010

Since the conclusion of the Second Congo War, Goma has been plagued by conflict despite the peace agreements of 2002. In 2006, it became a focal point for the Armed Forces of the Democratic Republic of the Congo's 81st and 83rd Brigades, who remained faithful to Congolese Tutsi military defector Laurent Nkunda, who accused the government of neglecting to assimilate his military faction into the national army and failing to safeguard their interests. Numerous heinous crimes were committed by Nkunda during his reign of terror. In 2002, he sanctioned the massacre of over 150 people in Kisangani. In Bukavu in 2004, his insurgent affiliates, in conjunction with Colonel Jules Mutebutsi, executed widespread atrocities, including sexual violence and arbitrary detentions, predominantly targeting young girls. Human Rights Watch clamored for Nkunda's arrest in February 2006, but it wasn't until June of that year that his military faction made significant territorial gains, capturing localities like Bunagana, located 80 km from Goma.

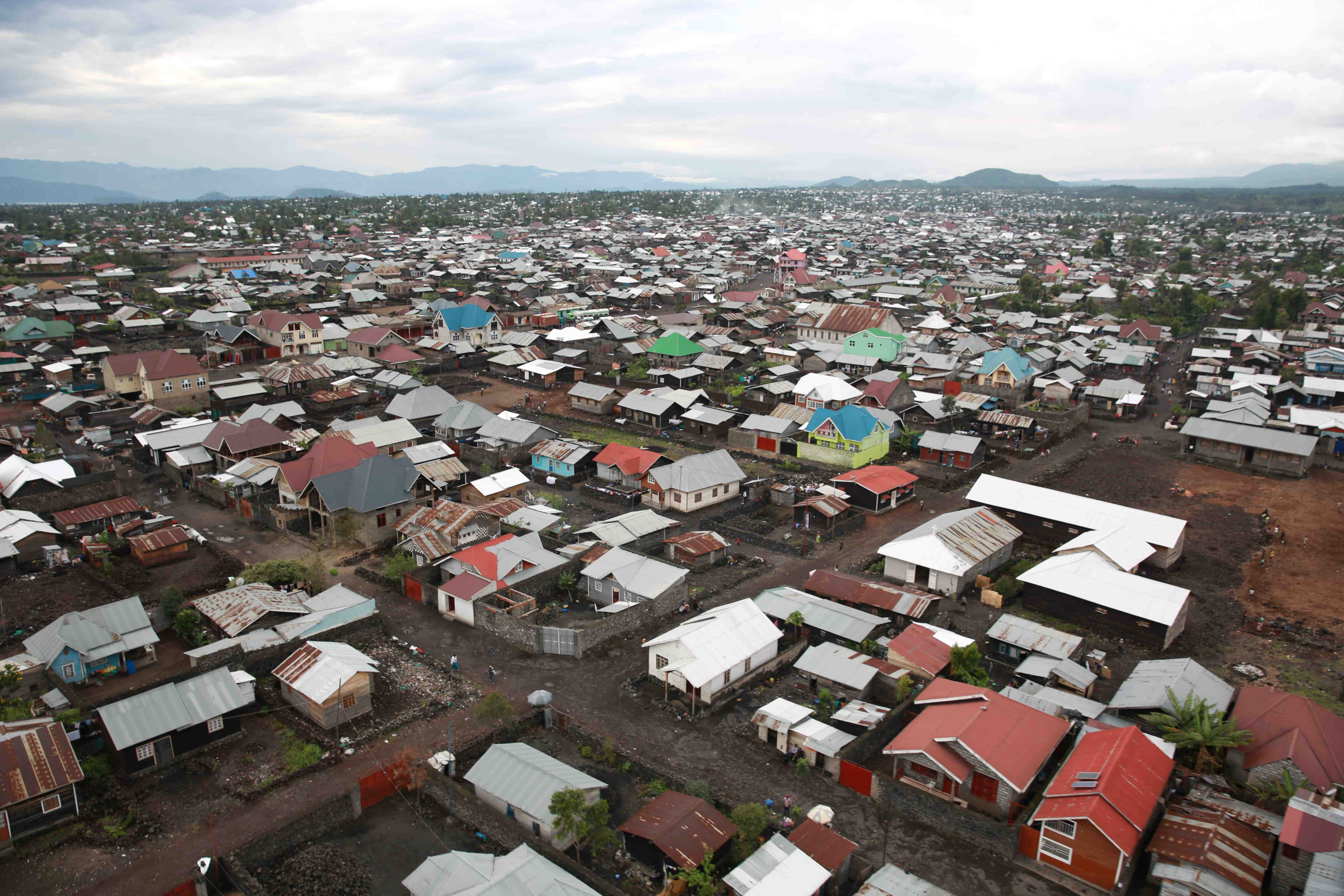
View of houses in Goma, 2014

Despite intermittent losses and counteroffensives by FARDC's 9th Integrated Brigade, Nkunda's forces maintained control over certain areas like Bunagana and Runyoni. By November 2006, reports cited three fatalities and 41 injuries, among them civilians, and by December, the violence had displaced over 80,000 people, many of whom sought refuge on the outskirts of Goma. The conflict escalated further in early 2007, with Goma's healthcare organization, Groupe d'Entraide et de Solidarité Médicale (GESOM), treating an average of three rape survivors daily from both urban and rural sectors. On 17 May, FARDC arrested 14 Rwandan nationals, including members of Nkunda's brigade, as MONUSCO noted that his militia in North Kivu was wearing distinctive Rwandan military uniforms. Later in May, the French Ambassador to the Democratic Republic of Congo, Bernard Prévost, visited the Mugunga displacement camp near Sake and announced that France would allocate over €2.6 million to the World Food Programme to support displaced persons in the eastern DRC. In June 2007, William Lacy Swing, Director General of the International Organization for Migration, expressed profound concern about the escalating conflict, citing rising insecurity, ethnic discord, the swelling numbers of internally displaced persons, and an increase in human rights abuses in North Kivu. Toward the end of June, Rwandan combatants launched a deadly assault on Lake Kivu, resulting in the deaths of four people, including three fishermen and a Congolese naval officer. The attackers also looted valuable fishing equipment and an outboard motor. Initial negotiations with Rwandan officials regarding cross-border security on Lake Kivu ultimately facilitated the partial recovery of the stolen fishing assets in Rwanda.

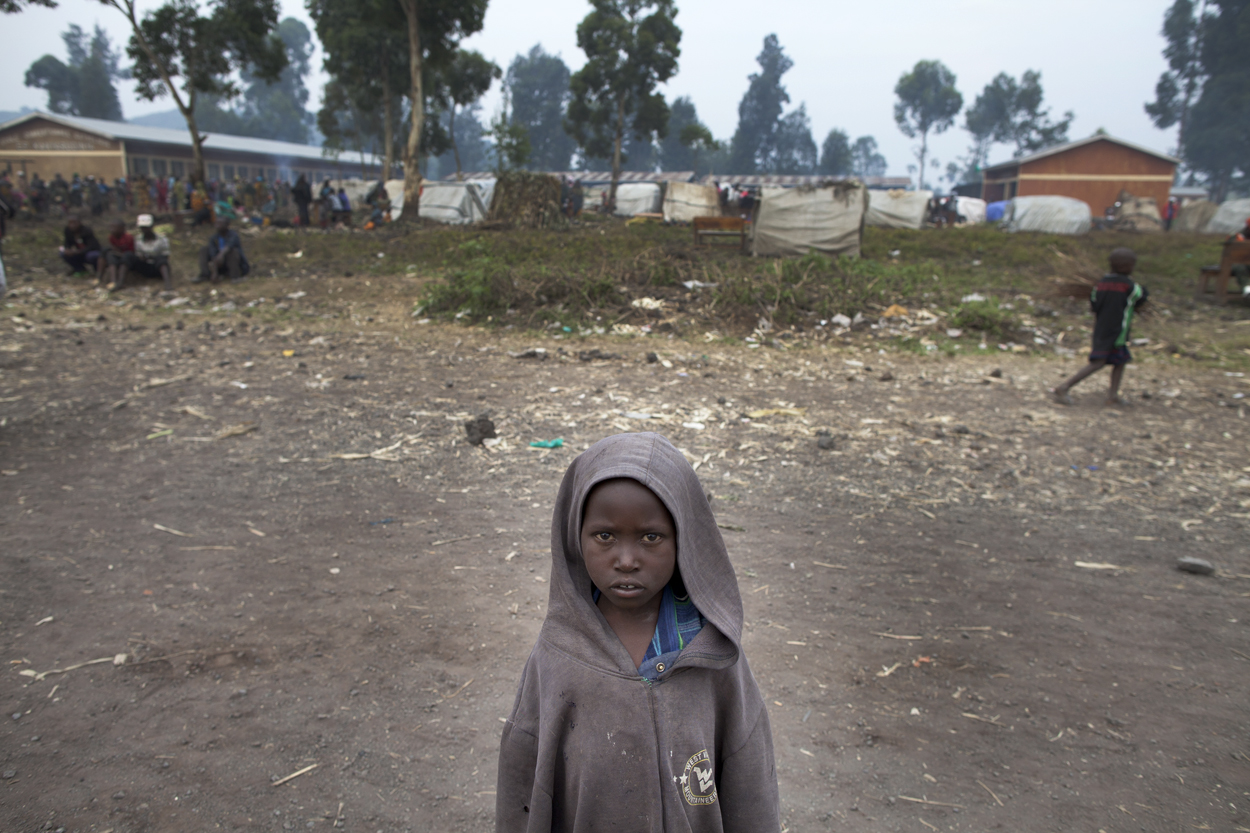
Displaced residents from the Kibumba-Rutshuru axis, fleeing clashes between Armed Forces of the Democratic Republic of the Congo and advancing March 23 Movement rebels, set up camp in Kanyaruchinya, 4 km north of Goma

On 6 September, MONUSCO brokered a ceasefire between the FARDC and forces loyal to Laurent Nkunda. However, the following day saw renewed clashes, with most of the population from Goma's surrounding regions seeking shelter in the Mugunga, Lac-Vert, and Ndosho neighborhoods, as well as Goma Centre, fearing further confrontations between the FARDC and Nkunda's forces. Fighting between Nkunda's forces and the Mai-Mai community-based militia, Congolese Patriotic Resistance (PARECO), which claimed to protect its community from Nkunda's forces, led to the deaths of 5 people in Bitonga in southern Masisi Territory. Nine deceased people were subsequently uncovered in three separate mass graves within Rubare, approximately 12 km from Rutshuru, north of Goma. Two other bodies were discovered in the administrative support post of Kisharo's office, around 20 kilometers from Kiwanja, along the route to Nyamilima and Shasha, within Rutshuru Territory. On 27 October 2008, the Battle of Goma broke out in the city between the Congolese army, supported by MONUSCO, and Nkunda's CNDP rebels; 200,000 refugees fled the town.

On 3 November 2012, there was a clash between Congolese and Rwandan troops on the border just north of Goma. Goma was later seized by the M23 Movement on 20 November 2012. Later that year, the Rwandan-backed rebel group, the March 23 Movement (M23), made significant territorial gains in North Kivu. Fighting began with the FARDC in Nyiragongo Territory, particularly in the Kibumba groupement of Bukumu Chiefdom, resulting in the M23 taking direct control of the entire territory. The territorial administrator and most of his staff fled strategically. As clashes spread to the southern part of the Munigi groupement and surrounding areas, Goma ultimately fell to M23 on 20 November 2012. Under M23 rule, the city's residents experienced terror due to the rebel presence, limited access to drinking water, lack of electricity, deteriorating hygiene and sanitation, sharply rising prices, higher unemployment, restrictions on freedom of expression, and increased social inequality. 13 people were killed, 23 women were sexually assaulted, 17 men were kidnapped, 109 motorcycles were confiscated, and 1,970 laptops were stolen.

On 22 February 2021, the Italian ambassador, Luca Attanasio, was killed in an apparent kidnapping attempt near Virunga National Park. He was part of the U.N.'s World Food Programme (WFP). Two others were also killed.

The M23 campaign, which pitted M23 against the FARDC and other armed groups, has displaced around 1.1 million people, including over 600,000 now confined to overcrowded, unsanitary displacement sites surrounding Goma. Some regional efforts have sought to contain the crisis, including the deployment of Southern African Development Community (SADC) forces and high-level summits aimed at reviving the peace process and securing a ceasefire. On 12 February, South Africa announced the dispatch of 2,900 troops to support the SADC mission in eastern DRC, though the operation suffered losses when two South African soldiers were killed and three wounded by M23 mortar fire on 15 February. Despite these initiatives, prospects for lasting peace remain uncertain, particularly in the absence of direct dialogue between the Democratic Republic of Congo and Rwanda. By January 2025, Goma was again targeted in a renewed M23 offensive, resulting in widespread casualties, looting, infrastructure damage, and mass displacement, with nearly 3,000 people reportedly killed. On 27 January, the city was captured by M23, and more than 4,000 detainees escaped from Muzenze prison amid the fighting, during which hundreds of female inmates were reportedly raped and burned alive. A year later, on 27 January 2026, the Congolese government organized a national commemoration titled Résistance, Résilience et Unité du peuple congolais (meaning "Resistance, Resilience, and Unity of the Congolese People") at the Académie des Beaux-Arts in Kinshasa to honor civilians killed or displaced by the conflict.

=== Coltan conflict-driven crime ===
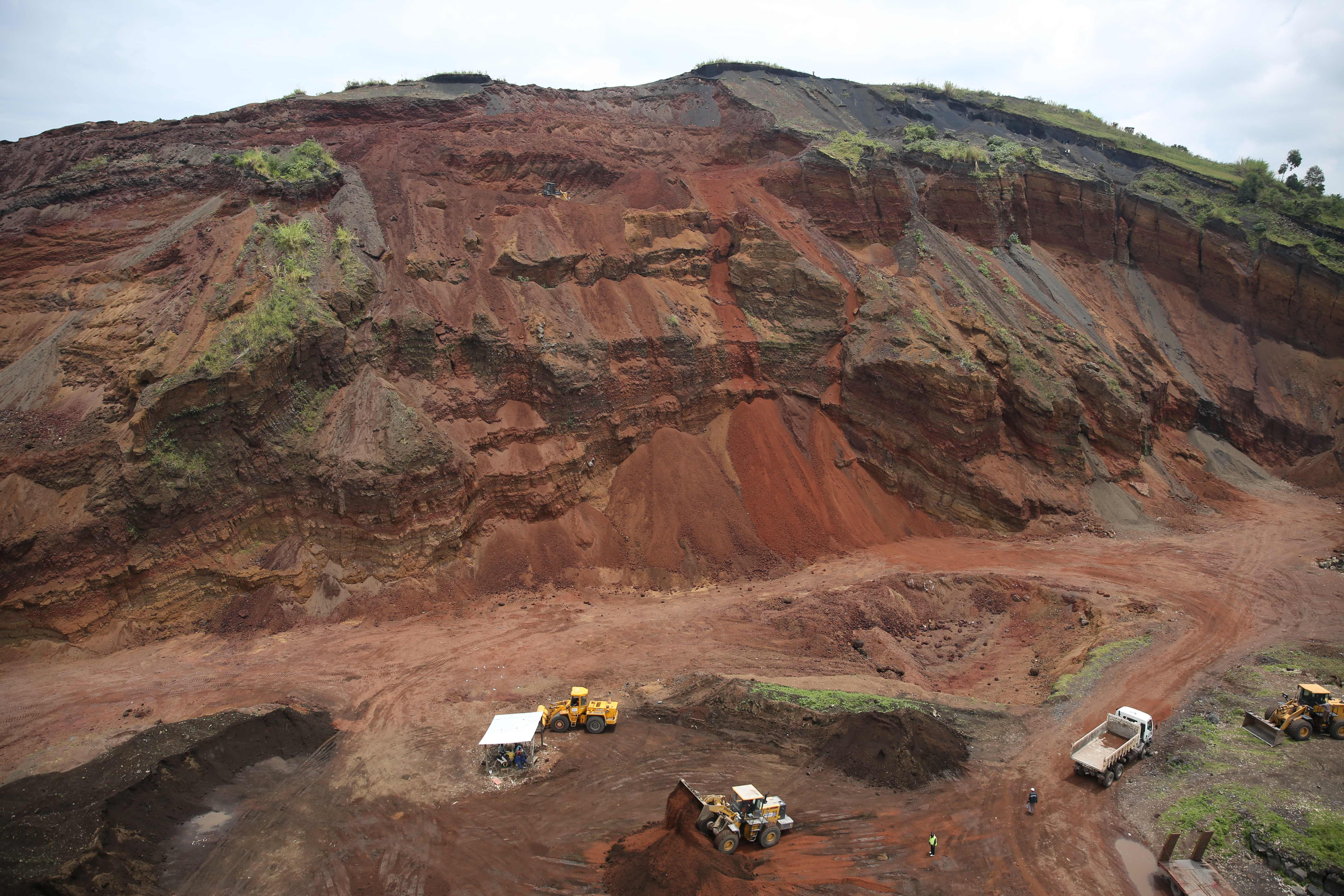
Quarry near Goma

The regional conflict surrounding coltan and other lucrative resources has compounded Goma's challenges with crime. Armed groups, including the Rwandan military, the RCD-Goma, and various opposition factions, have been implicated in the systemic targeting of civilians as they vied for dominion over resource-abundant zones. During 2000 and 2001, RCD-Goma forces reportedly conducted a spate of violent incursions into residences, particularly targeting individuals engaged in the coltan trade. Notably, on 18 November 2000, armed men, including RCD-Goma combatants, attacked the residence of Edouard Kasereka Kahimba, a coltan buyer. The assailants demanded business records and coltan, injuring Kahimba and assaulting his family members. On 29 December 2000, combatants reportedly targeted a coltan trader known as "Safro" Sanvura, ransacking his residence and shooting indiscriminately. Similar incidents persisted into 2001, such as the attack on Pierre Hakizimana on 9 April, in which he was robbed of $3,000 at gunpoint.

On 8 September 2001, unidentified men in uniform conducted an early-morning attack on Sengiyumva, a 41-year-old coltan trader residing in Katoyi. He sustained three gunshot wounds to his leg after being beaten with sticks, with both cash and mineral resources being seized. Subsequently, on 14 October 2001, another trader, Papy, aged 26, endured a violent assault in his home, resulting in two gunshot wounds to the abdomen, allegedly inflicted by RCD-Goma forces. Though Papy survived, he required prolonged hospitalization for recovery.

== Volcanic activity ==
Due to the Great Rift Valley being pulled apart, the area experiences frequent earthquakes and the formation of new volcanoes. Over time, volcanic eruptions have directly impacted Goma, with significant lava flows destroying nearby villages, neighborhoods, and roads north of the city. The 1923 and 1997 eruptions caused significant damage and loss of life, with lava flows encroaching upon Lake Kivu's shores and destroying sections of the city.

=== 2002 Nyiragongo volcano eruption ===
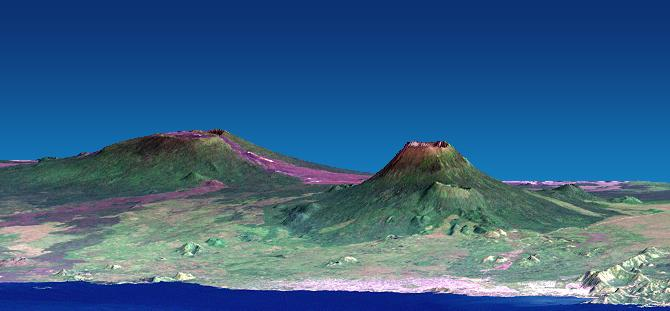
Computer image of Nyiragongo volcano generated from satellite photographs, showing the Goma-Gisenyi conurbation on the lake shore in the foreground. In the background, left, is the Nyamuragira volcano. Note that the vertical scale has been exaggerated.

In January 2002, Nyiragongo erupted, sending a stream of lava 200 metres (219 yd) to one kilometre (1,100 yards) wide and up to two meters (6½ ft) deep through the center of the city as far as the lake shore. Agencies monitoring the volcano were able to give a warning and most of the population of Goma evacuated to Gisenyi. The lava destroyed 40% of the city (more than 4,500 houses and buildings). There were some fatalities caused by the lava and by emissions of carbon dioxide, which causes asphyxiation. The lava also covered over the northern 1 km of the 3-kilometre (9,800 ft) runway of Goma International Airport, isolating the terminal and apron which were at that end. The lava can easily be seen in satellite photographs, and aircraft can be seen using the 2-km (6,500-ft) southern section of the runway which is clear of lava.

In March 2004, emissions from Nyiragongo volcano polluted the surrounding areas of North Kivu, including Rusayo, Bishusha, Birambizo, Tongo, Kitshanga, and Sake with water vapor (H_{2}O) laden with fluorine and carbon dioxide (CO_{2}).

=== 2021 Nyiragongo volcano eruption ===
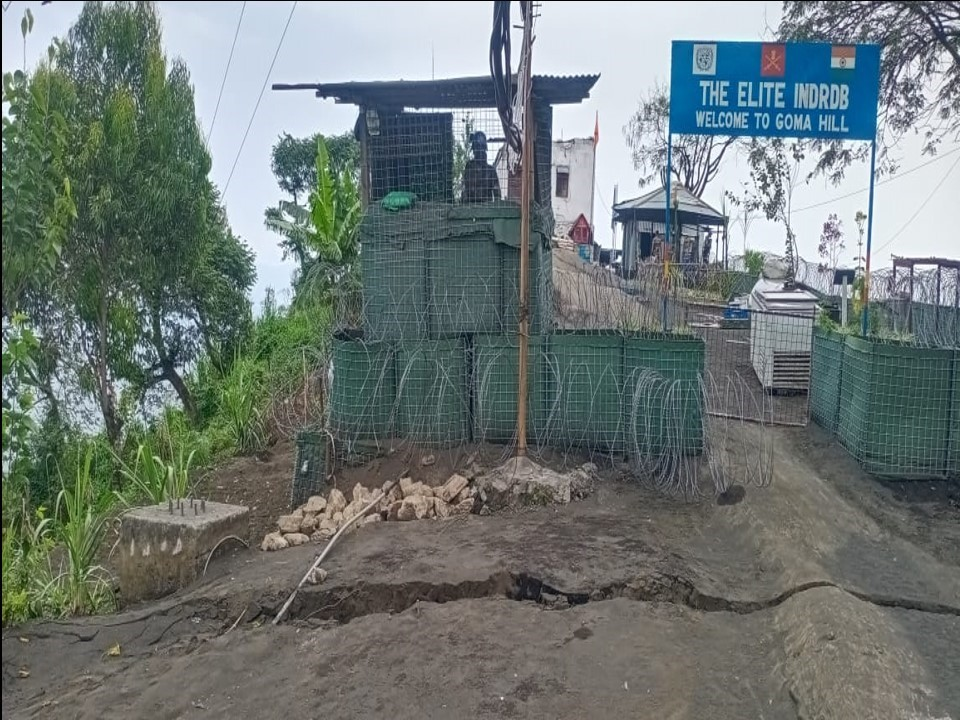
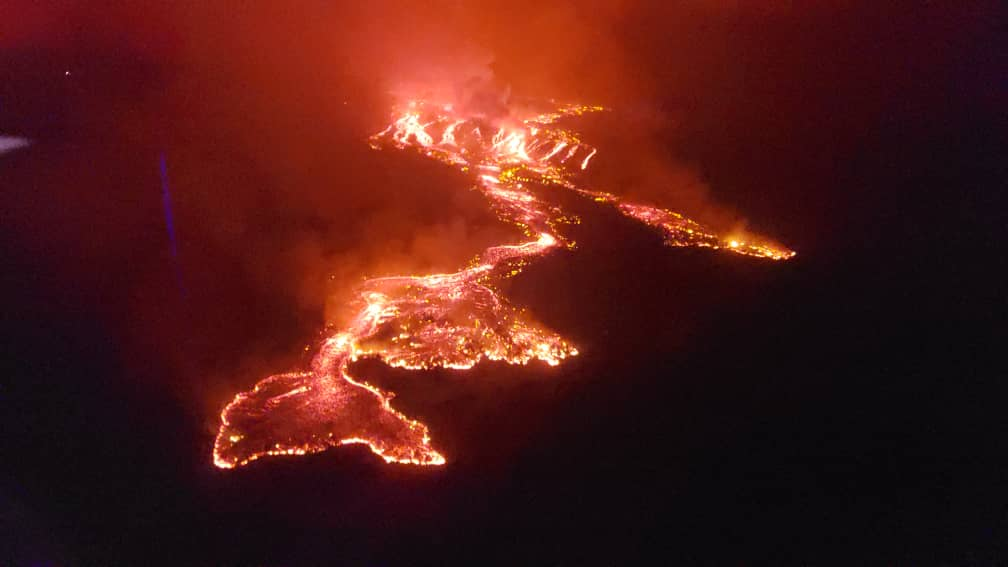
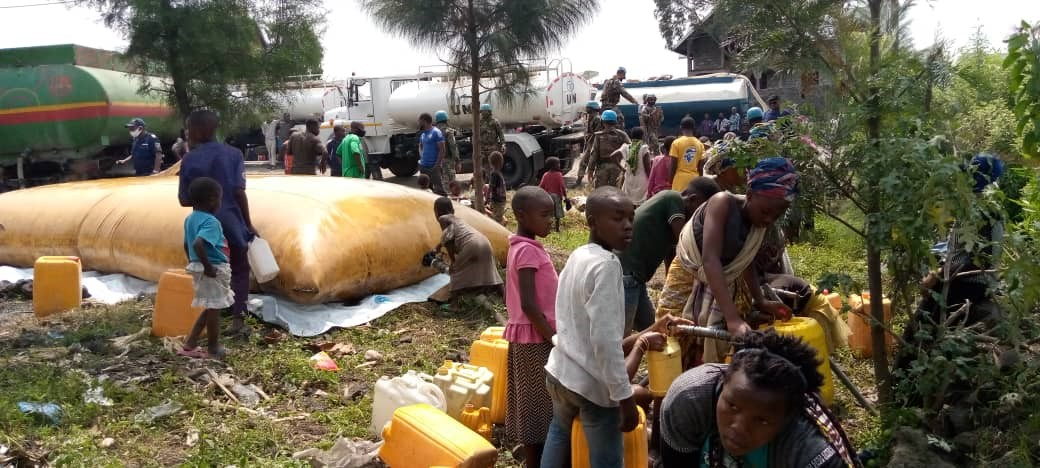
The 2021 Mount Nyiragongo eruption forced many residents to flee their homes in search of safety.

On 22 May 2021, Mount Nyiragongo erupted with lava flows closing a road and reaching the municipal airport. The Buhene quartier, located on the edge of Goma, was engulfed in flames, and more than 500 homes were covered in cooling lava. Parts of Virunga Energies's electricity facilities, which supplied electricity to nearly 15,000 homes in the city, were destroyed. Thousands of people fled to nearby regions, with some boarding boats on Lake Kivu, which lies on the border of the Democratic Republic of the Congo and Rwanda. Around 5,000 people crossed the border into Rwanda, while another 25,000 went northwest towards Sake. The lava stopped flowing around 3 a.m. on 30 May 2021, and the Congolese government ordered the city's evacuation plan to be set in motion. On the same day, residents returned to Goma to check on their homes. However, the United Nations Children's Fund reported that more than 170 children were still missing. The official report on the number of deaths is yet to be released, but the Minister of Communication and Media, Patrick Muyaya Katembwe, said at least 15 people died. Nine people died in a traffic collision, four died while trying to escape from the central prison of Munzenze, and two were calcined by lava.

=== 2023 Nyamulagira volcano eruption ===
On 9 May 2023, lava flows were seen inside the central crater of Nyamulagira volcano. By 17 May, a large glow above the volcano was visible, leading to lava flows in Virunga National Park. While the lava flows do not harm the population, the volcano emits large amounts of gas and fine particles. Thermal radiation over the crater increased sharply on 19 May, indicating an increase in the outpouring of lava, but the activity was still confined to the summit. Effusive eruption increased further on 20 May, forming two large lobes — one outside the caldera to the west and another to the south. Although not visible, satellite images on May 19 and 20 showed that the current eruption at the volcano was emitting enormous amounts of sulfur dioxide (SO_{2}).

=== Threat posed by Lake Kivu ===
Lake Kivu is one of three lakes in Africa identified as having huge quantities of dissolved gas held at pressure in its depths. The other two, Cameroon's Lake Monoun and Lake Nyos, experienced limnic eruptions or "lake overturns", catastrophic releases of suffocating carbon dioxide probably triggered by landslides. Lake Nyos's overturn in 1986 was particularly lethal, killing nearly two thousand people in the area around the lake. Kivu is 2,000 times bigger than Lake Nyos and also contains dissolved methane as an additional hazard – though concentration of carbon dioxide is much lower than in Lake Nyos. Nearly two million people, including the population of Goma, live in the vicinity of Lake Kivu and could be in danger from a limnic eruption triggered by one of the nearby volcanoes and the earthquakes associated with them.

The CO_{2}-rich gas location, known locally as mazuku, caused the deaths of people and animals in 2023.

== Demographics ==
=== Population ===
In 1984, Goma's population was estimated at 80,000. Its population has since grown through natural increase, internal migration, and refugee arrivals. The 1994 Rwandan genocide and the Congo wars of 1996–1997 and 1998–2003 contributed to displacement and migration to the city. Subsequent conflict in the region has continued to influence population movements and urban expansion.

A 2024 estimate put Goma's population at approximately 782,000, although other estimates place it above two million, partly due to migration that is not officially recorded.

Goma is home to several Bantu-speaking ethnic groups, including the Nande, Nyanga, Hunde, Hutu, Tembo, Kumu, Shi, Piri, Kano, Mbuba, Mbuti, and Tutsi. The Hunde speak Kihunde, the Nande speak Kinande (or Kiyira), the Piri speak Kipiri, the Talinga speak Kitalinga, the Kano speak Kikano, the Kusu speak Kikusu, the Kumu speak Kikumu, the Mbuba speak Kimbuba, the Nyanga speak Kinyanga, and the Tembo speak Kitembo. Meanwhile, the Hutu and Tutsi speak Kinyarwanda, and the Mbuti speak Kimbuti.

==== 2011 demography ====
Commune of Goma

Quartiers	Congolese population (H)	(F)	(GA)	(FI)	Tot.	Non-refugee foreign population	Refugee population	Total population
Les Volcans	4,033	3,923	3,085	3,203	14,244	725	0	14,969
Mikeno	6,981	6,916	8,751	8,935	31,583	48	0	31,631
Mapendo	9,501	10,789	11,555	12,305	44,150	48	0	44,198
Katindo	7,196	6,202	7,714	8,358	29,470	61	21	29,552
Himbi	10,862	11,130	10,909	11,509	44,410	17	0	44,427
Kyeshero	10,646	10,100	16,852	17,125	54,723	170	0	54,893
Lac Vert	1,123	1,402	2,324	2,377	7,226	37	0	7,263
Total Goma	50,342	50,462	61,190	63,812	225,806	1,106	21	226,933

Commune of Karisimbi

Quartiers	Congolese population (H)	(F)	(GA)	(FI)	Tot.	Non-refugee foreign population	Refugee population	Total population
Murara	6,906	7,090	10,055	11,131	35,182	6	0	35,189
Kahembe	4,130	5,095	7,055	9,498	25,778	16	0	25,794
Majengo	10,828	12,302	14,717	15,793	53,640	6	0	53,646
Virunga	3,012	3,253	3,030	5,279	14,574	0	0	14,574
Mabanga-Nord	6,995	8,675	10,090	13,570	39,330	13	0	39,343
Mabanga-Sud	20,109	29,005	17,761	18,915	85,790	40	0	85,830
Kasika	10,000	10,677	13,225	13,728	47,630	19	0	47,649
Katoyi	12,042	13,139	17,499	19,150	61,830	14	0	61,844
Ndosho	9,634	10,441	18,814	20,417	59,302	4	0	59,306
Mugunga	2,571	3,241	5,147	5,680	16,639	0	0	16,639
Bujovu	3,535	3,602	6,094	7,064	20,295	237	0	20,532
Total Karisimbi	89,762	106,520	123,487	140,221	459,990	356	0	460,346

Grand total

Congolese population	685,796
Non-refugee foreign population	1,462
Refugee population	21
Total population	687,279

=== Education ===
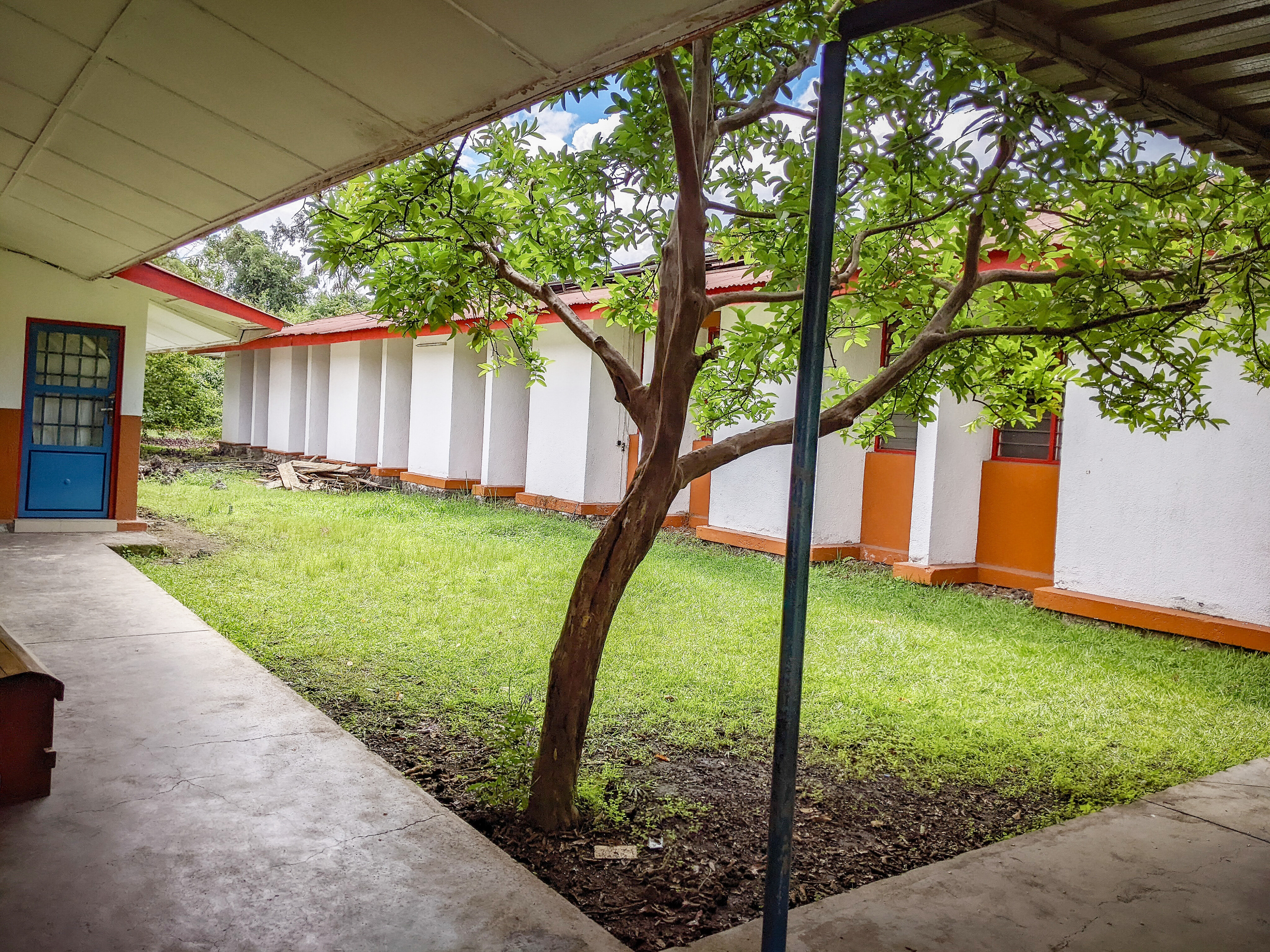
Free University of the Great Lakes Countries

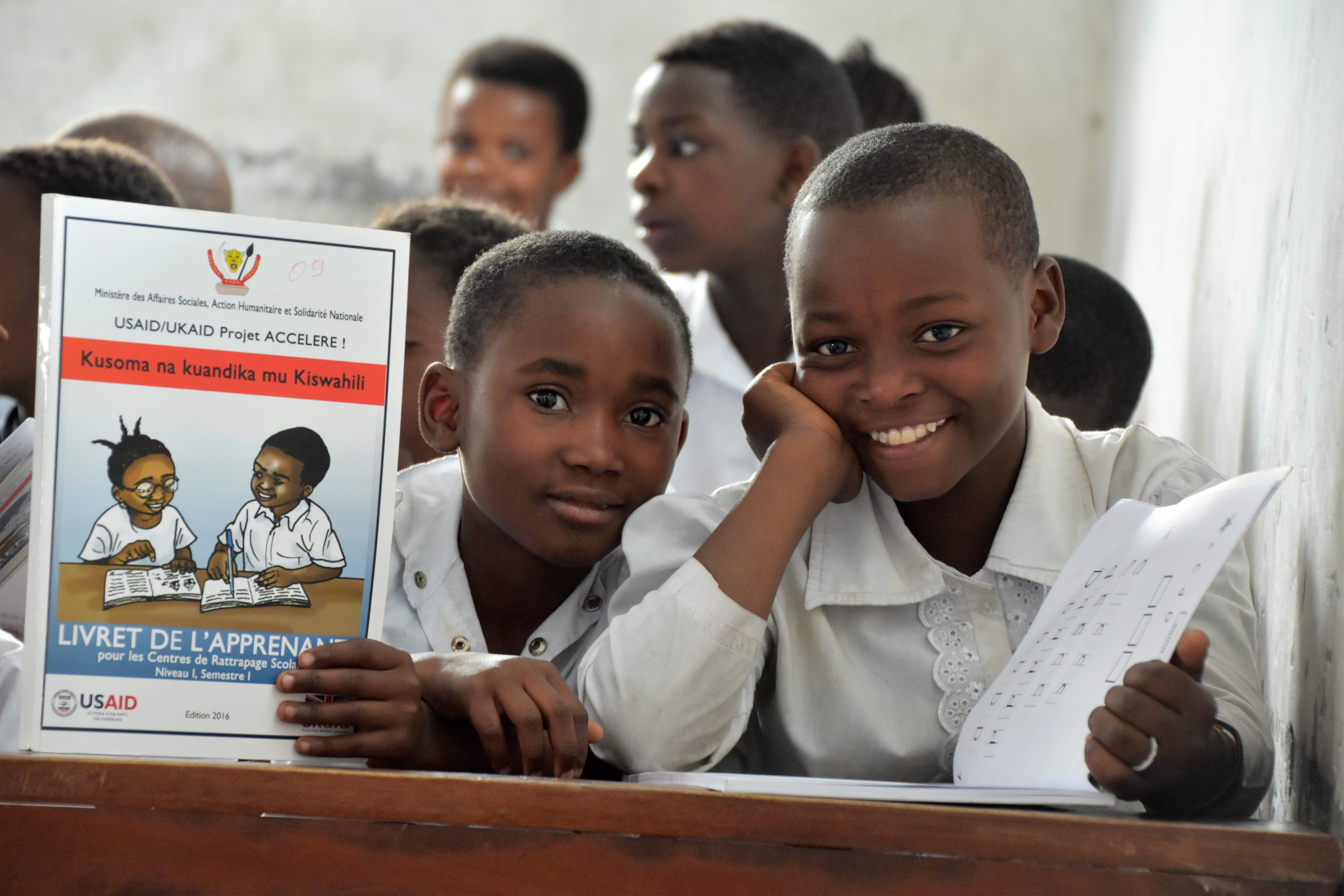
Classroom in Goma

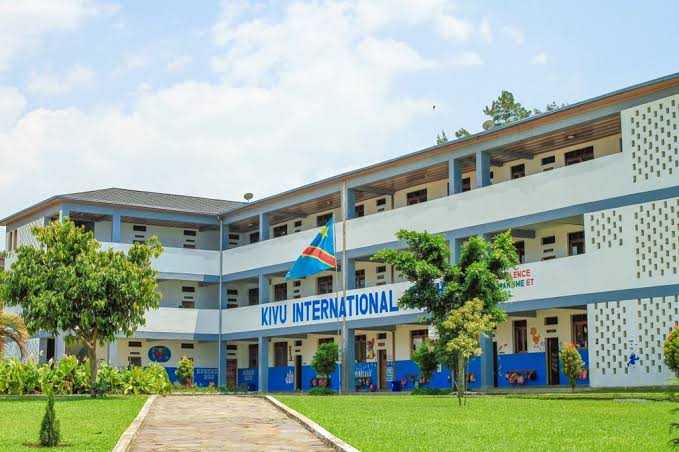
Kivu International School

Education has three levels: kindergarten (ages 3–5), primary school (ages 6–12), and secondary school (ages 12–18). The city also has several higher-education institutions, including the Free University of the Great Lakes Countries (ULPGL) and the University of Goma, which fall under the relevant national higher-education framework.

In 2016, ULPGL ranked second nationally according to International Colleges and Universities and third nationally in the Webometrics ranking, in which it placed 19,099th globally.

Goma is also home to other operational higher education institutions:

No.	Name of the institution
1.	Université de CEPROMAD (UNIC-Goma)
2.	Université Adventiste de Goma (UAGO)
3.	Université Libre des Pays de Grand Lac (ULPGL)
4.	Université de Goma (UNIGOM)
5.	Université du Kivu (UNIKIVU)
6.	Université de la Conservation de la Nature et de Développement de Kasugho (UCNDK-Goma)
7.	Université Libre du Kivu (ULKI)
8.	Institut Supérieur de Formation Bancaire d'Assurance et d'Administration publique (ISABAS)
9.	Université Saint Joseph
10.	Université de la Paix (UNIP-RDC)
11.	Université de l'Afrique Subsaharienne (UAS)
12.	Université Francophone du Congo (UFC)
13.	Université Progressiste des Grands Lacs (UPROGL)
14.	Université des Hautes Technologies de Grands Lacs
15.	Sahel Institut Supérieur de Science et Technologie (SIST)
16.	Institut Supérieur de Commerce (ISC)
17.	Institut Supérieur Pédagogique (ISP-Goma)
18.	Institut Supérieur Pédagogique (ISP-Nyiragongo)
19.	Institut Supérieur Pédagogique (ISP-Machumbi)
20.	Institut Supérieur de Tourisme (ISTOU)
21.	Institut Supérieur de Management de Grand Lac (ISMGL)
22.	Institut Supérieur des Techniques Appliquées (ISTA)
23.	Ecole Nationale de Cadastre
24.	Institut Supérieur de Développement Rural de Grand Lac (ISDR-GL)
25.	Institut Supérieur de Développement Rural (ISDR)
26.	ISTAD
27.	ISTAC
28.	ISPD
29.	ISTD
30.	ISTGEA
31.	ISTG
32.	SDR-Graben
33.	ISESOD
34.	Institut Superieur des Arts et des Métiers (ISAM-Goma)
35.	Institut de Batiment et Travaux Publics (IBTP-Goma)
36.	IBTP-Rutshuru
37.	Institut Supérieur de la Sapientia (ISSA)
38.	Grand Séminaire de Buhimba
39.	Institut Facultaire de Droit (IFAD)
40.	Institut Supérieur d'Administration et de Gestion
41.	Institut Supérieur de Techniques Médicales (ISTM)
42.	Institut Supérieur des Techniques Médicales et de Développement (ISTMD)
43.	Institut Supérieur de Développement Rural (ISDR-Goma)
44.	ISSAGEA
45.	Institut Supérieur de Science de Santé de la Croix Rouge de Goma (ISSSCR-Goma)
46.	Centre Universitaire de Paix (CUP)

==== Community homes and social centers ====
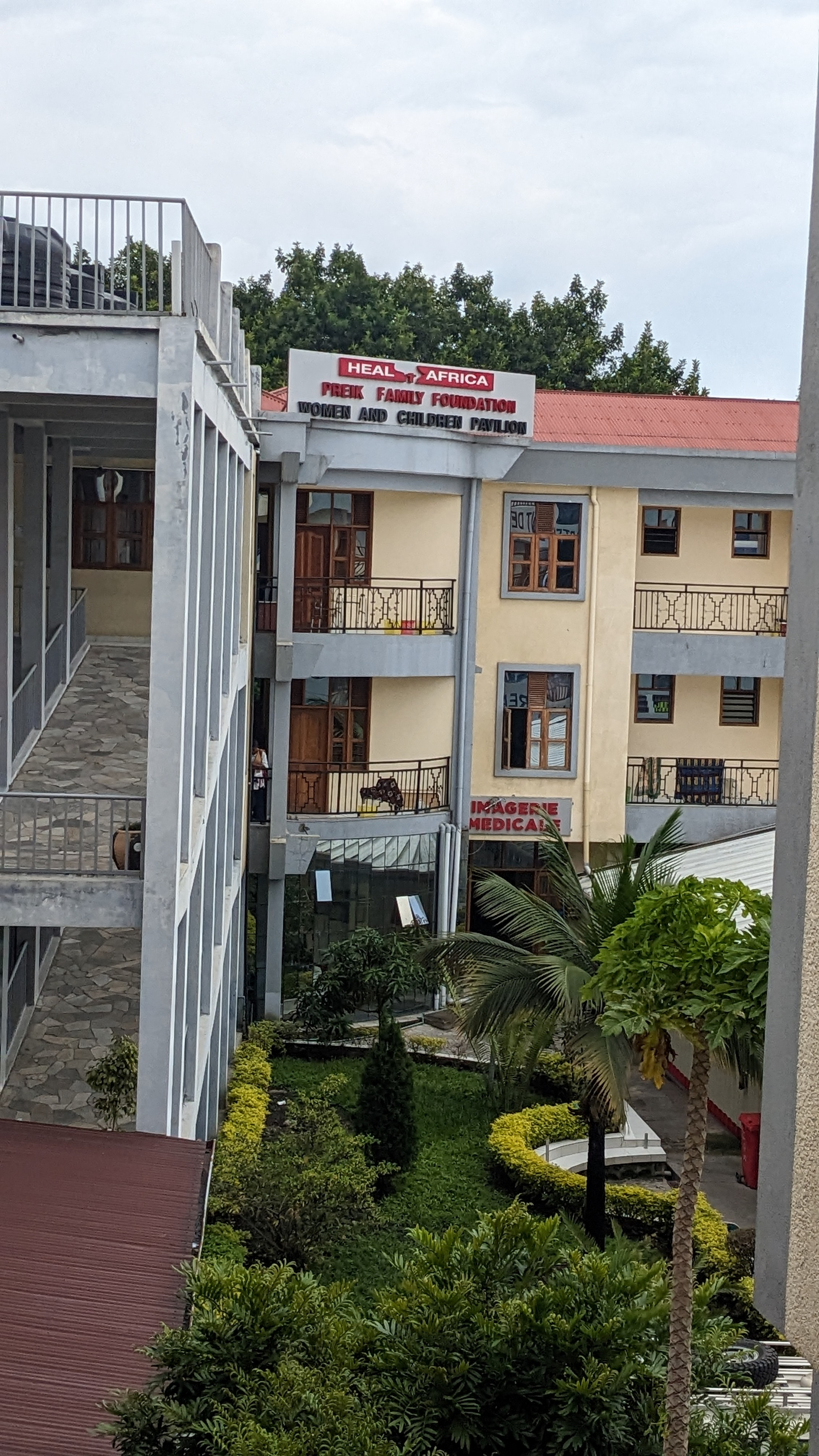
Hospital Heal Africa

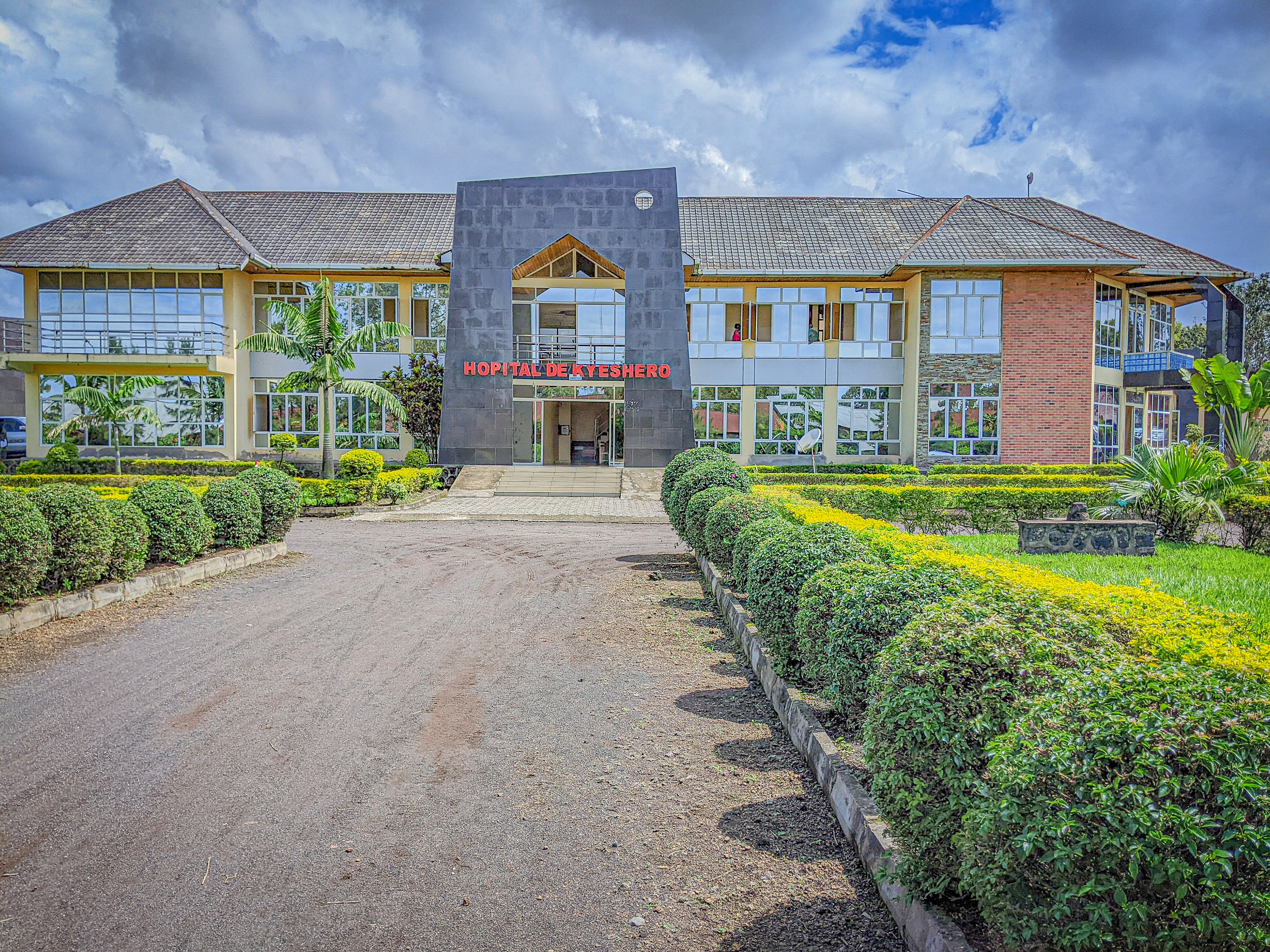
Hospital of Keyshero

Beyond formal schooling, Goma hosts numerous literacy centers that provide vocational training and language education, including community homes and social centers such as the Karisimbi Social Promotion Center (Centre de promotion sociale de Karisimbi; CPS-K), the CBCA-Virunga Social Animation Center (Centre d'animation sociale CBCA-Virunga), and the Center for Physically Disabled People (Centre pour Handicapés physiques); together, these institutions support 3,846 people (2011 estimates), while 1,381 abandoned or street children were registered in 2008 and placed under the care of the Kinyogote Center.

=== Health care ===
A range of medical and health-related training institutions operate throughout the city, including the Goma Provincial Hospital (hôpital provincial de Goma), referral hospitals such as CBCA Ndosho, CBCA Virunga, and Charité Maternelle, as well as private clinics, public health centers and posts, and nutrition centers in areas such as Birere, Notre-Dame d'Afrique, and Mugunga.

=== Religion ===
Goma is home to several Christian churches and temples including the churches of the Roman Catholic Diocese of Goma, Kimbanguist Church, Baptist Community of Congo (World Baptist Alliance), the Baptist Community in the Center of Africa (World Baptist Alliance), Assemblies of God, Province of the Anglican Church of Congo (Anglican Communion), Presbyterian Community in Congo (World Communion of Reformed Churches). There are also Muslim mosques.

Goma hosts a Catholic priest seminary Redemptoris Mater run by the Neocatechumenal Way.

== Economy ==
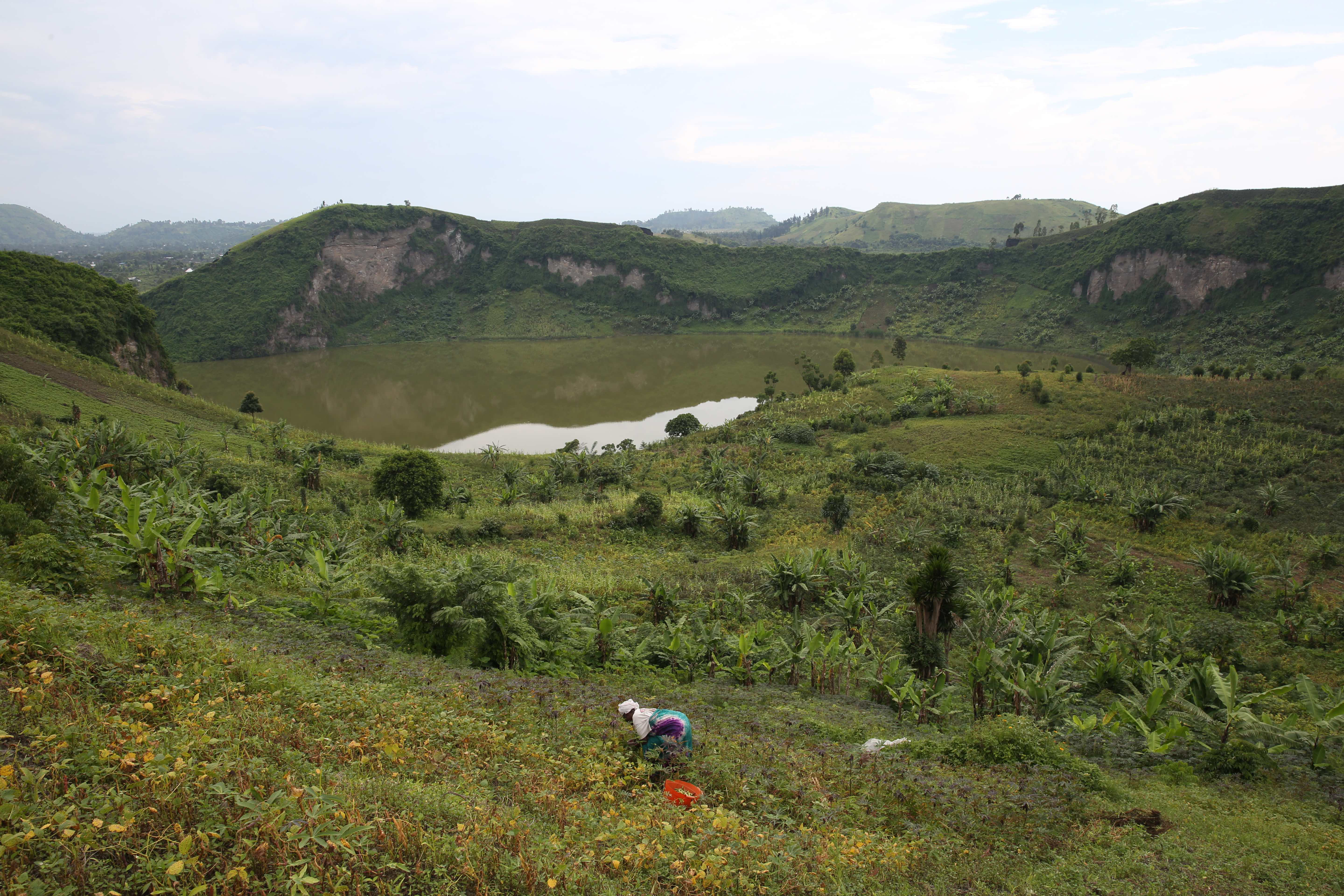
Cassava cultivation on the highlands surrounding the crater lake Lac Vert in the Mugunga quarter

=== Agriculture ===
Goma's economy relies mainly on agriculture, with a significant proportion of its population making a living by buying and selling farm products. Because the local currency is unstable, many transactions are carried out in foreign currencies. Primarily centered on the production of raw materials, including plant agriculture, fishing, hunting, and fish farming, these activities typically employ artisanal methods and old production techniques. Agricultural products are primarily sourced from neighboring Masisi Territory and Rutshuru Territory, along with resources from Lake Kivu, which hosts thriving fish markets along its shores twice a week. Cultivation primarily focuses on garden crops and selected staples such as legumes, maize, and tubers.

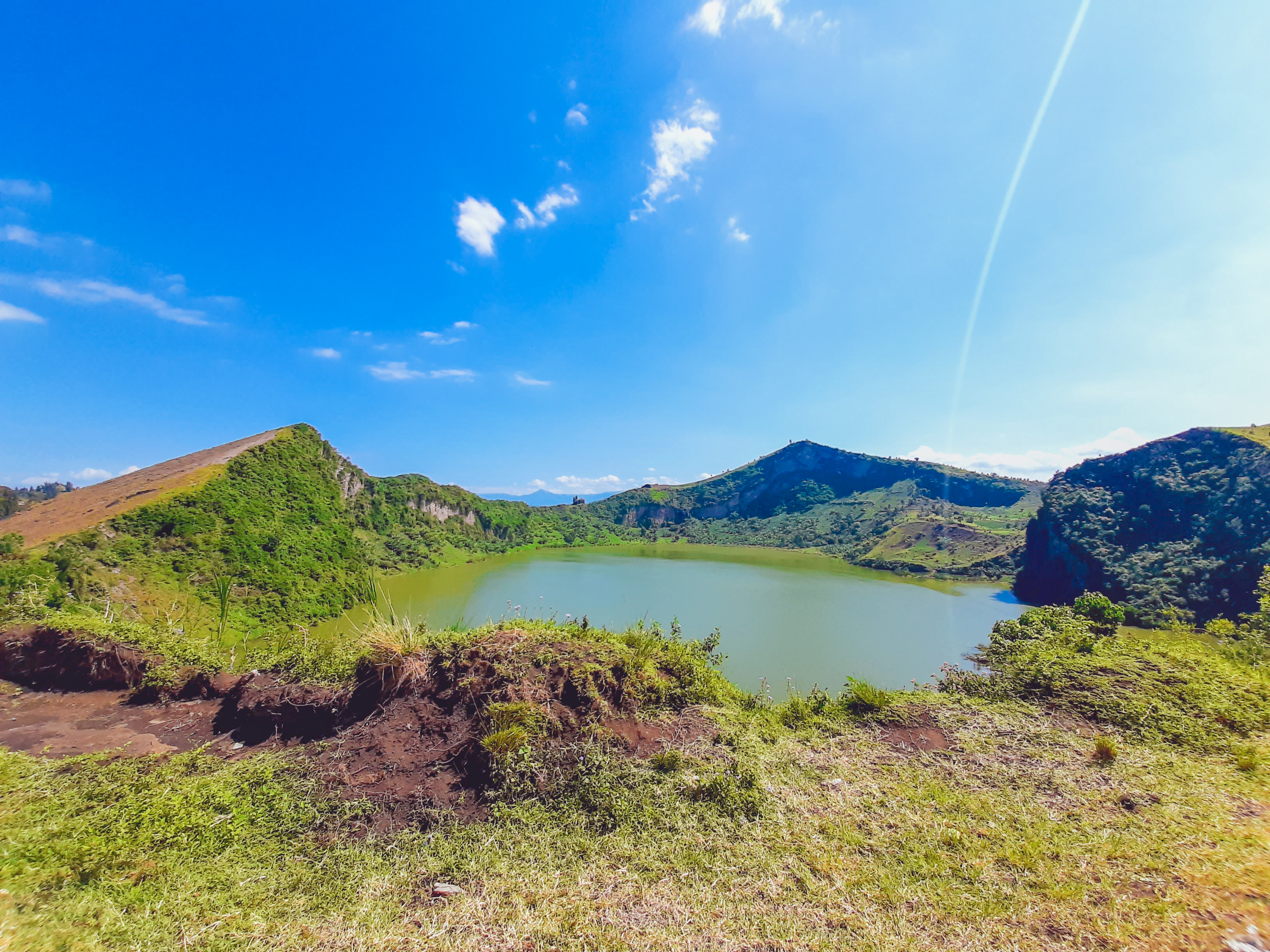
Lac Vert of Mount Mugunga in Goma, situated southwest of the Nyiragongo volcano and northeast of Lake Kivu

During the colonial period, economic development was encouraged through plantation farming in North Kivu's fertile highlands, which established the region as a critical "food basket" for the Belgian Congo. Legislative frameworks, including the Draft Decree and Royal Decree of 12 December 1939, laid the foundation for agricultural oversight. This initiative culminated in the establishment of OPAC (Office des Produits Agricoles de Costermansville) on 4 February 1948, which was subsequently renamed OPAK (Office des Produits Agricoles du Kivu; currently known as Office Nationale du Café, ONC). These agencies oversaw the production and export of cash crops such as Coffea arabica and pyrethrum. At that time, large amounts of food products, including grains, root crops, meat, and palm oil, passed through Goma for redistribution to urban epicenters such as Kinshasa and Kisangani. The construction of a port in Kyeshero, later repositioned nearer to central Goma, augmented trade routes by linking the city to a north–south economic corridor extending through Bunia, Rutshuru, Bukavu, Uvira, and Kalemie. While the colonial economy also invested in resource extraction, North Kivu's mining sector remained underdeveloped relative to mineral-rich regions like Ituri and South Kivu. Consequently, Goma's prominence as a mineral trading hub was relatively subdued until the 1980s, but trade routes connecting Goma to markets in Uganda and Rwanda remained active and continued to support local commerce after independence.

In the post-independence era, these historical trade networks gained significance as the local population increasingly relied on informal and transborder economic activities to circumvent the exploitative practices of the Zairean state. By the 1980s, a substantial portion of agricultural production, including papaya, tea, cinchona, and coffee, was smuggled or exported through informal channels, with Goma International Airport playing a key role in this clandestine commerce. Estimates from 1985–1986 suggest that up to 60% of local coffee production bypassed formal export systems. In 2001, the Compagnie pour la Promotion des Activités Café (COOPAC) was established and headquartered in the Les Volcans quartier of the Goma commune. It has since become a major organization in the coffee sector in eastern Congo and an integrated coffee processing chain, including a hulling facility established in 2004 and a washing station situated along the shores of Lake Kivu. The city is also home to Maizeking, an industrial enterprise specializing in the manufacturing of products derived from corn, sorghum, soybeans, and wheat.

=== Secondary and tertiary sectors ===
The secondary sector is relatively underdeveloped. Notable manufacturing enterprises include the MTC (Master Tabac Congo) conglomerate producing premium-grade cigarettes, coffee processing factories like SOTRAKI and ONC as well as food production companies such as Au Bon Pain and Boulangerie Mont Carmel, which manufacture baked goods. Other industrial entities include Nyiragongo Cement, a cement production facility; Mbinza, a mattress manufacturing company; and La Chocolaterie Lowa, a Congolese chocolate producer. Additionally, the city has a growing bottled water industry and photographic processing facilities, such as Fujicolor.

Financial industry is significant in the city, with banking and non-banking financial institutions serving the population. Banking institutions like Central Bank of the Congo, Banque Privée du Congo, Bank of Africa, Banque Commerciale et de Développement, Banque Internationale de Crédit, Banque Internationale pour l'Afrique Central, Equity Banque Commerciale du Congo, Standard Bank, First International Bank, Trust Merchant Bank, Rawbank, Afriland First Bank, Acces Bank, Eco Bank Democratic Republic of the Congo, and others provide financial services, while non-banking institutions, including 17 microfinance organizations, fortified with credit components cater to various fiscal needs within the city. Notably, microfinance entities like SOMIF/NFT, IMF Hekima, PAIDEK, Sociéte de Microcrédit Congolais, SOMIFI/REJEDE, COOPEC-Imara, COOPEC-Tumanini, and IMF PAIF, as well as NGOs like the Initiative Congolaise pour la Gestion Autonome des Populations (ICGP), the Association of Support for Grassroots Initiatives, Association d'Appui aux Initiatives de Base (APIBA), Organisation des Femmes pour le Développement (OFED), Solidarité et Fraternité dans l'Action, and Association de diabétiques du Congo (ADIC), contribute to economic development by supporting small businesses and entrepreneurial ventures. The city is also home to quasi-public non-bank financial institutions exemplified by Société Nationale d'Assurance (SONAS), Institution Nationale de Sécurité Sociale (INSS), Caisse Générale d'Épargne et de Crédit (CADECO), and Société Congolaise des Postes et Télécommunications (SCPT).

Goma benefits from support organizations like UNDP, UWEKI, and CAFED, which foster entrepreneurship, provide training, and facilitate access to resources for local businesses.

=== Tourism ===
Goma is a popular tourist destination and offers a variety of attractions. Virunga National Park, located north of Goma, boasts more than 3,000 faunal and floral species. Tchegera Island is located southwest of Goma. The intercultural ballet has regularly participated in fairs and cultural events, including the annual Goma Tourist Fair (foire touristique de Goma; FOTOGO), organized by the National Tourism Office (Office National du Tourisme; ONT) since 2007. The troupe has also recently performed at the Goma Agricultural Fair (foire agricole de Goma), where they received the FAGOP award.

== Infrastructure ==
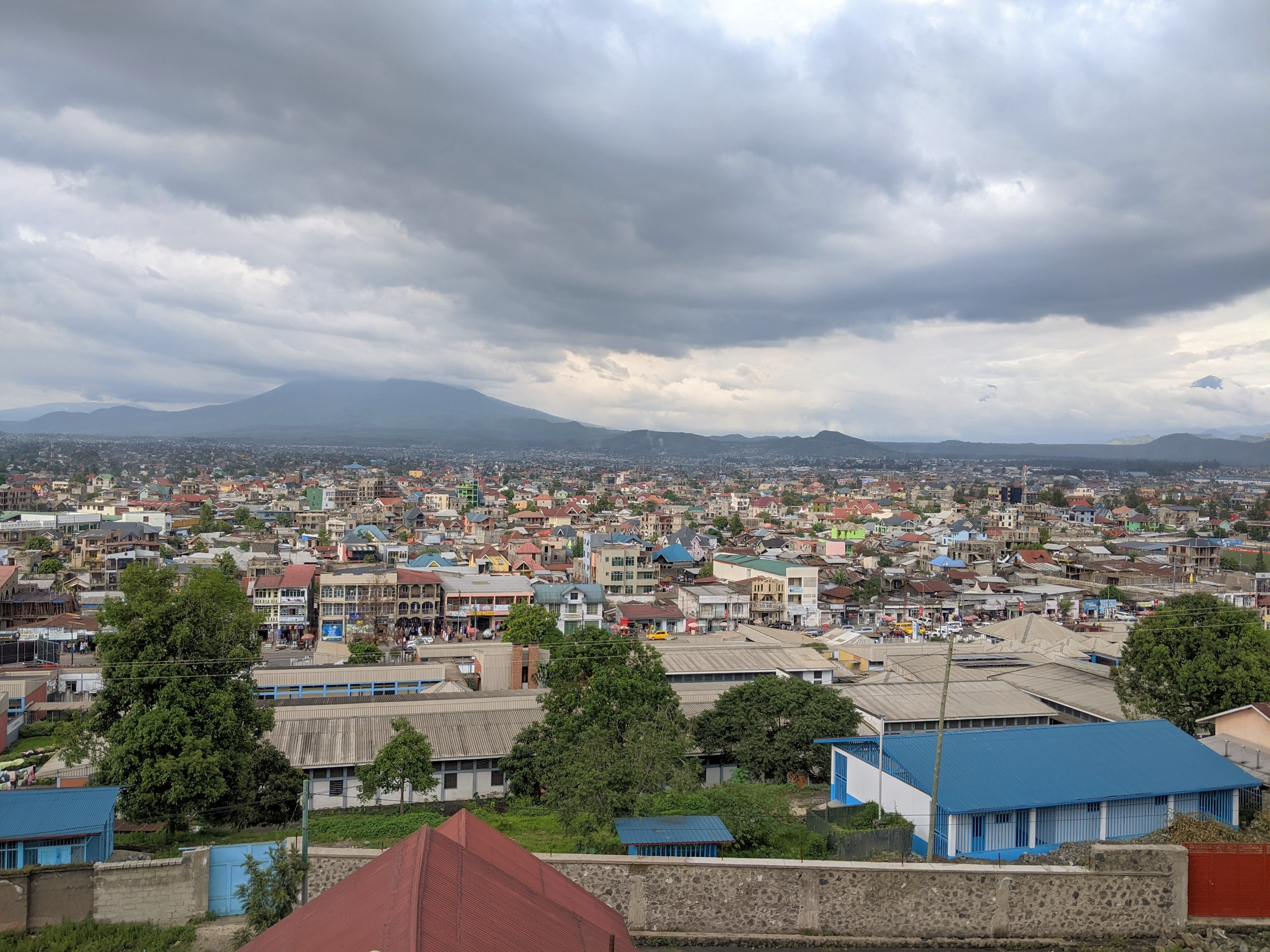
An aerial view of Goma

Urbanization in Goma is in a state of progressive expansion, though the cityscape remains predominantly characterized by horizontal, low-rise structures. Concentrated largely around National Road 2, commercial activity is vigorous, with numerous bars, shops, Nganda (local eateries), and hotels lining this central corridor. Major commercial zones such as Supermatch, Nyiragongo Cement, and several key stations like Ihusi, IBB Service, AFRICOM, Ni Yetu, Tout Jeune, and GPI dominate the city's urban landscape.

While low-rise architecture remains the prevailing style due to its affordability and practicality, multi-story buildings are beginning to emerge. Goma's traditional wood board construction, popular due to its speed and cost-efficiency, is increasingly complemented by more durable vertical structures, which require significantly more extended construction periods due to the materials and techniques involved.

One of the most notable developments in Goma is the Birere quartier, also known as Mikeno. The area, located within the Goma commune, is recognized as the city's oldest residential quartier. It is characterized by its multi-ethnic demographic and serves as a focal point for informal cross-border trade, housing numerous stores, warehouses, restaurants, and popular clubs known as 'ngandas'. Birere occupies part of the "zone tampon", the neutral buffer zone between DRC and Rwanda, and remains a key location for economic activity, despite numerous efforts to shift the city's commercial heart to safer areas after the 2002 Nyiragongo volcanic eruption. The presence of the "petite barrière", a pedestrian border crossing, facilitates the illicit trade of small goods and provides a source of income for many Congolese and Rwandans.

=== Transport ===
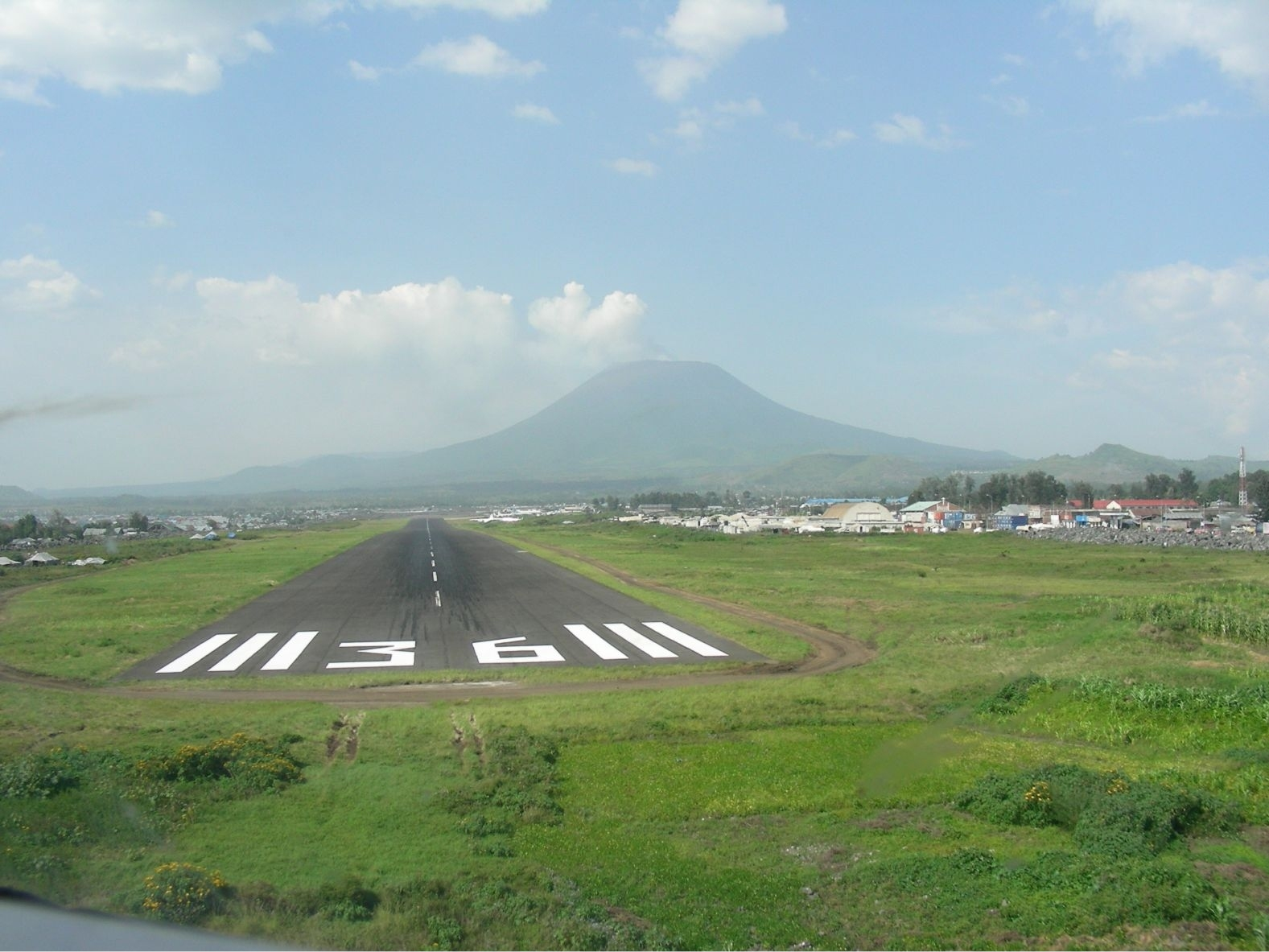
Goma International Airport

==== Air ====
Aviation is a significant transport mode linking Goma with domestic and international destinations. Goma International Airport, which serves as the city's principal gateway, handles passenger and cargo traffic and facilitates two international routes to Entebbe and Nairobi, serviced by Ethiopian Airlines and Jambojet. The aviation industry in Goma has changed over the years with the emergence and departure of carriers. While enterprises such as Virunga Air, Charter, and Sunair have ceased operations, stalwart aviation entities like société de Transports et Messageries au Kivu SARL (TMK), alongside Wimbi Dira Airways and Hewa Bora Airways persist in operating and rendering their services.

==== Maritime ====
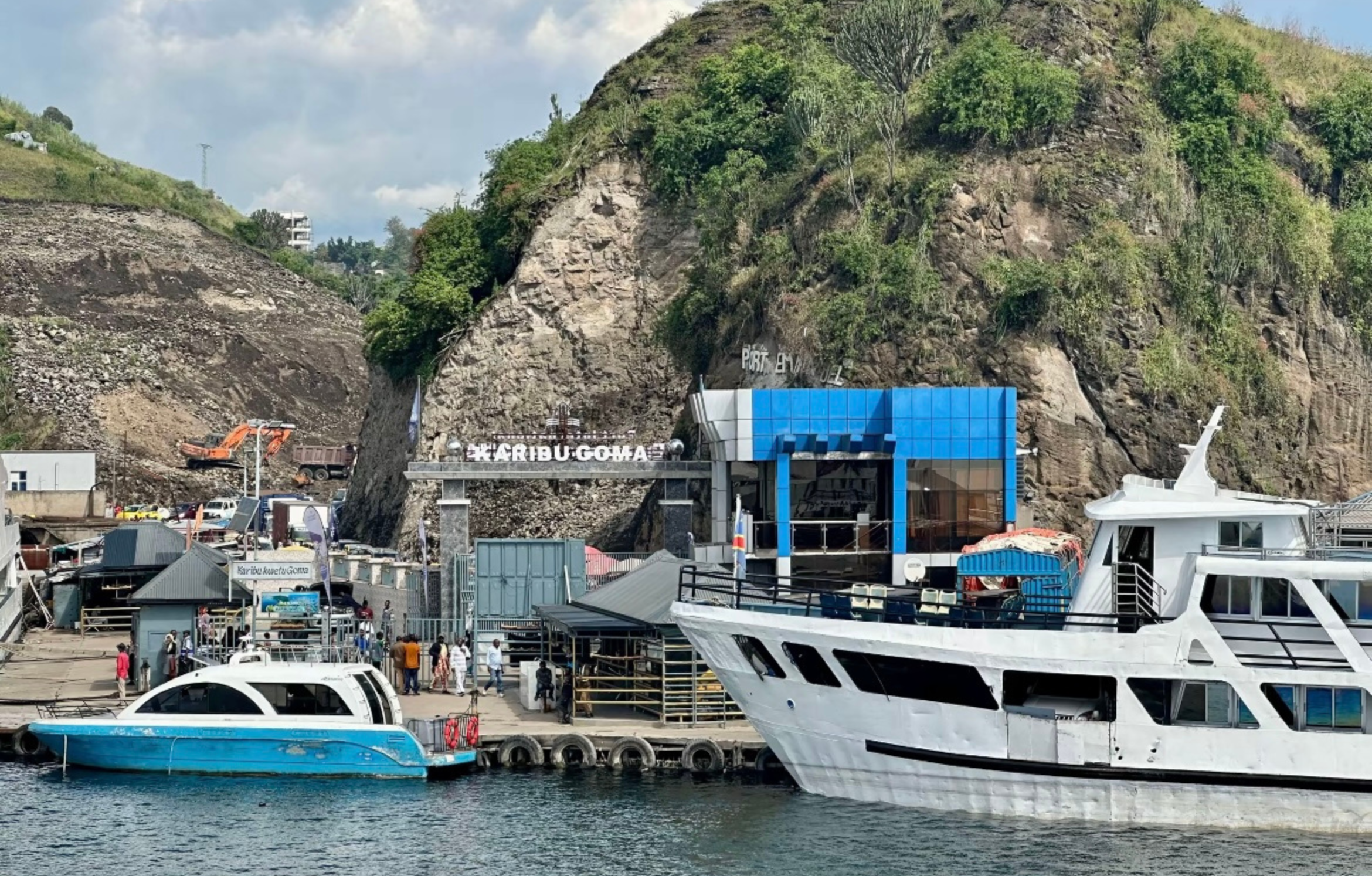
A view of Goma taken from the port

Maritime transport connects Goma with nearby cities like Bukavu in the South Kivu Province. Boats and ferries operated by companies such as the Société Nationale des Chemins de fer du Congo (SNCC) and private operators like Rafiki and Ihusi Hotel facilitate the movement of people and merchandise goods across Lake Kivu. Notably, boats such as Emmanuel 2, assembled locally, provide an alternative mode of transport, significantly reducing travel time compared to road travel.

==== Road ====
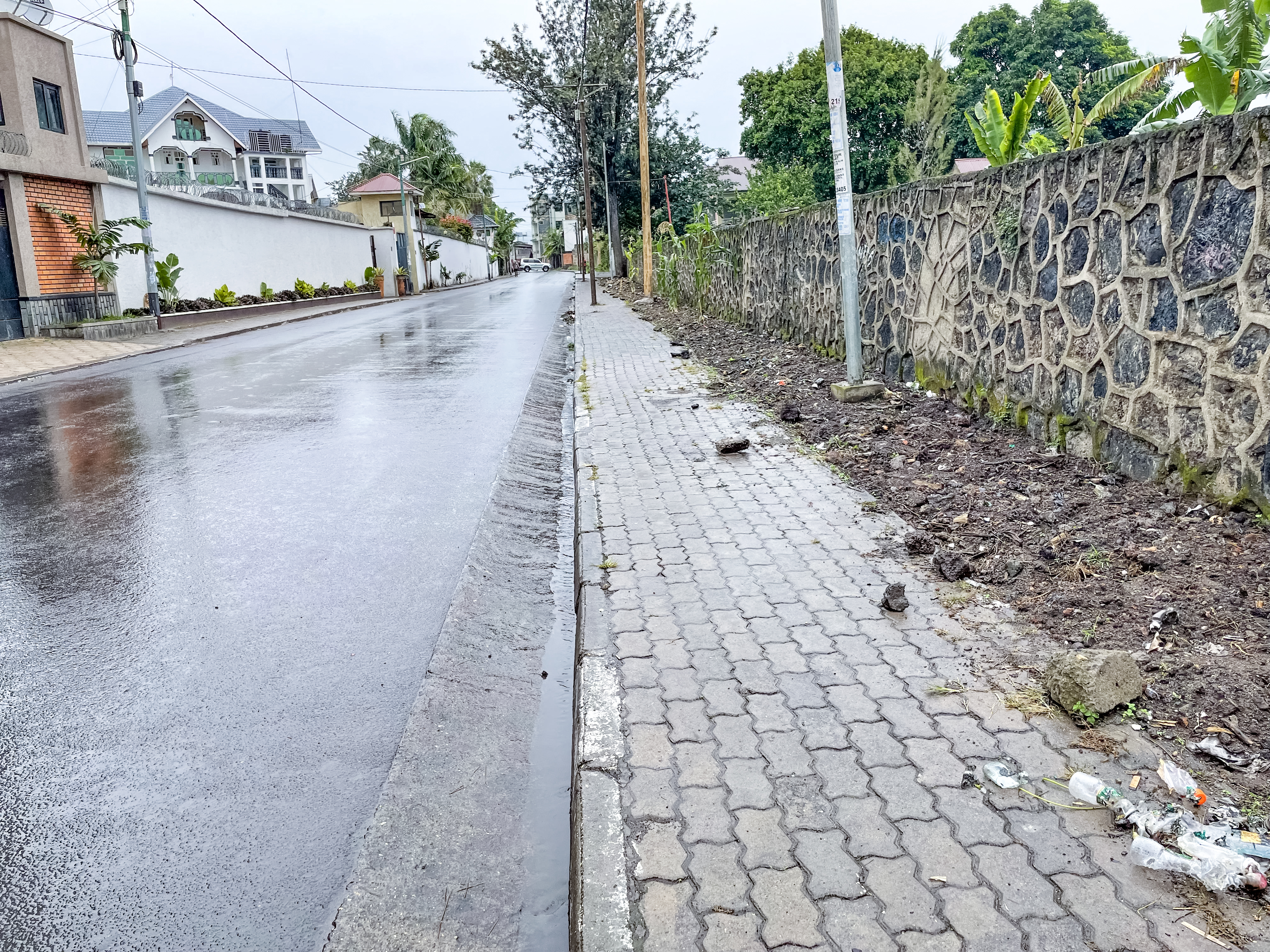
A road in Goma

Road transport, presided over by private operators, is vital for intra-city and inter-city travel, encompassing a network of paved and unpaved routes. National Road No. 2 bisects the urban landscape, supplemented by smaller road segments, though their cumulative length is at most three kilometers. The city's road transport system comprises various vehicles, including car, trucks, buses and motorcycles, with car and motorcycle taxis facilitating the majority of shuttle services.

Car taxis, often referred to as city taxis, are predominantly used for passenger transport, while luggage taxis cater to the movement of goods. Motorcycle taxis, commonly employed for passenger and small package deliveries, play a vital role in local mobility. Goma's location on the Rwandan border ensures its connectivity to Gisenyi, with regular bus services facilitating travel between Goma and Kigali in less than four hours.

Goma's road network connects to Masisi, Walikale, Kisangani, Rutshuru, Butembo, Beni, Kasindi, Bunia, and Bukavu, among other destinations. Motorcycles operate day and night, with different drivers serving distinct shifts. Although major roads in Goma have improved, some residential avenues remain underdeveloped. Numerous roads are obstructed, either by improperly constructed homes, mountains of discarded waste, or incomplete construction projects.

=== Mobile networks and media ===
Goma offers cellular network services such as SuperCell, Airtel, Vodacom, Orange RDC (formerly Congo Chine Télécoms), and Tigo, which facilitate communication exchanges locally and internationally and play an integral role in business transactions, social interactions, and emergency services.

The city has a variety of Swahili, Lingala, and French language radio stations, including RTNC Goma, Radio Okapi, RSI (Radio Sauti ya Injili), Radio La Colombe, RTCT (Radio Télévision Communautaire Taina), RTC (Radio Télévision la Colombe), Kivu 1, Mishapi Voice TV, Mutaani, RSM (Radio Sauti ya Matumaini), VBR (Virunga Business Radio), Pool FM, RAO FM (Radio Alpha Omega), COMICO, Emmanuel TV, and Source de Vie, offering various news, entertainment, religious programming, and cultural content.

Goma's radio stations are:

No.	Radio	Category
1.	RTNC (Radio Télévision Nationale Congolaise)	Public
2.	Radio Okapi	Humanitarian
3.	RTCT (Radio Télévision Communautaire Taina)	Community
4.	RTC (Radio Télévision la Colombe)	Community
5.	Kivu 1	Community
6.	Mishapi Voice TV	Community
7.	Pool FM	Humanitarian
8.	RSI (Radio Sauti ya Injili)	Evangelical
9.	RAO/FM (Radio Alpha Omega)	Evangelical
10.	Emmanuel TV	Evangelical
11.	RSM (Radio Sauti ya Matumaini)	Evangelical
12.	VBR (Virunga Business Radio)	Private marketing radio

== Government ==
Goma is a four member electoral district of the 2024–2029 National Assembly, the deputies are:

- Hubert Furuguta (A/A-UNC)
- Charles Kakule (AAD-A) replacing Muhindo Nzangi nominated to the Suminwa government
- Erick Lucky Mumbere (A/B50)
- Patrick Munyomo (AFDC-A)

=== List of mayors ===
- Kana Guzangamana, 1989–1991
- Mingale Mwenemalibu, 1991 (for a few months)
- Athanase Kahanya Kimuha Tasi, 1991–1993
- Mashako Mamba Sebi 1993–1998
- Kisuba Shebaeni 1998–2001
- Francois-Xavier Nzabara Masetsa 2001–2005
- Polydore Wundi Kwavwirwa 2005–2008
- Roger Rachid Tumbula, 2008–2011
- Jean Busanga Malihaseme, October 2011 – July 2012
- Naason Kubuya Ndoole, July 2012–2015
- Dieudonné Malere Mamicho, 2015–2018
- Timothée Mwisa Kyese, February 2018–2022
- Prof. Kennedy Kihangi Bindu, November 2022–2023
- Faustin Kapend Kamand, July 2023–present

== Crime ==
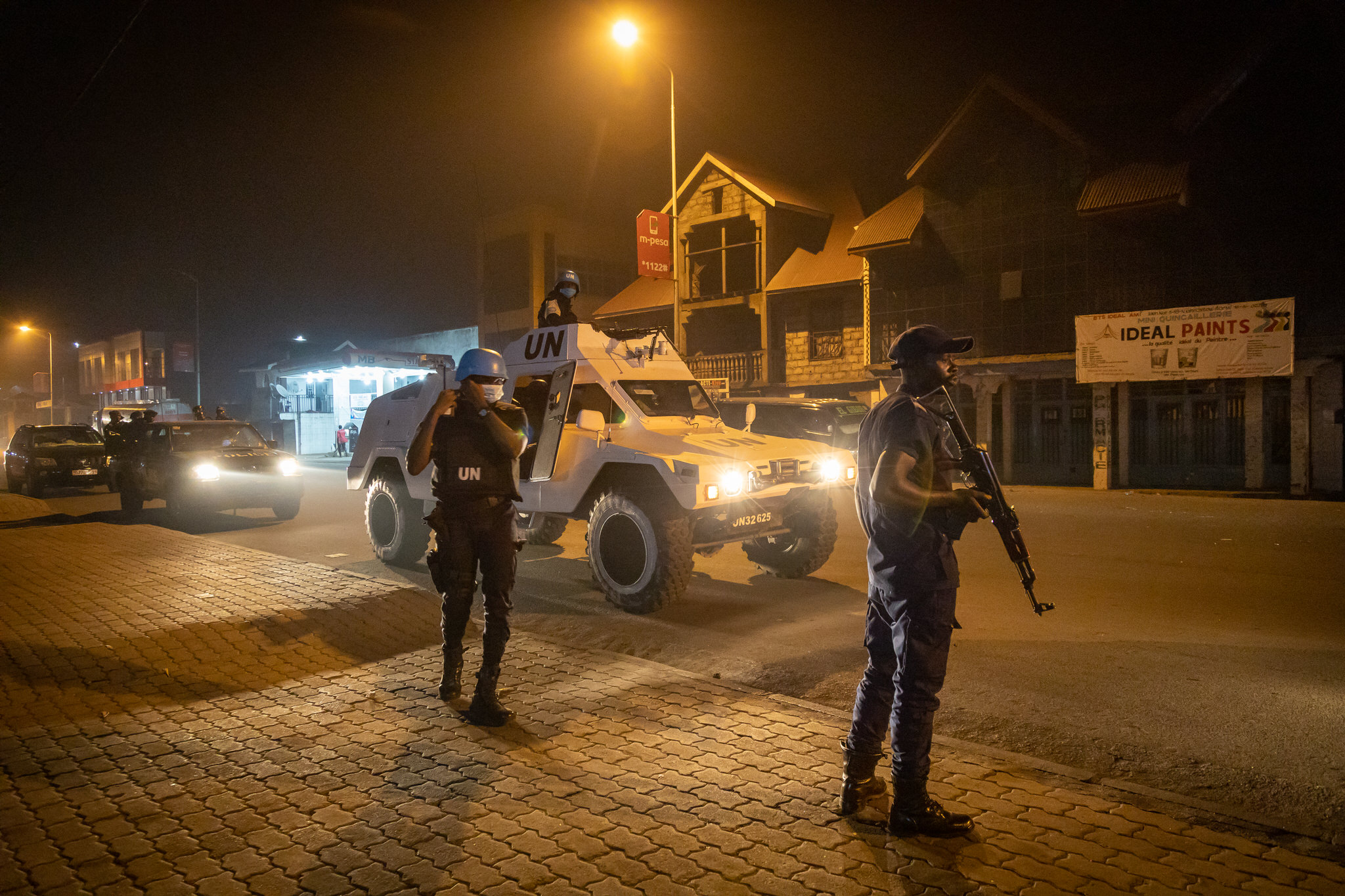
As part of efforts to secure Goma and its surrounding areas, a joint 19-hour night patrol was conducted in May 2020 by United Nations Police, the Congolese National Police, and the Armed Forces of the Democratic Republic of the Congo.

Since early 2019, violent crimes such as murders, robberies, and kidnappings have plagued outlying quartiers, notably Ndosho and Mugunga in Karisimbi commune. Ndosho, known for its bustling markets and brothels, is characterized by high crime rates and ethnic heterogeneity, while Mugunga, predominantly populated by Hutus, formerly hosted extensive refugee camps in the aftermath of the Rwandan genocide, alongside sizable IDPs settlements during periods of heightened conflict between the CNDP (and subsequently M23) and the FARDC from 2008 to 2010 and 2012 to 2013. Although the camps have been dismantled, the quartier is characterized by a high number of former IDPs (Hunde and Hutu) who settled in Mugunga. Both quartiers border Virunga National Park to the north and the main road to Sake to the south, dividing the Goma and Karisimbi communes, with diurnal activities centered along this road.

A significant number of Mugunga's inhabitants, including brigands and maibobo (street children), gravitate towards Ndosho during daylight hours, lured by its superior commercial prospects. Throughout the day, encounters with insecurity primarily revolve around pickpocketing, extortion by maibobo, gang-related harassment, and coercive measures employed by security personnel in Ndosho. Brigandage and petty crime have evolved into a viable means of subsistence for many and are part of an urban economy of survival and enrichment. Pilfered merchandise goods are openly sold in the markets, with numerous criminals attaining notoriety within their quartiers and certain gang leaders achieving city-wide renown.

During the night, security conditions worsen and become more violent. Most residents return to their homes, while mixed patrols of the Police Nationale Congolaise (PNC) and Police Militaire (PM) units, along with gangs, prowl around the streets. Without pedestrian traffic and under the cloak of darkness, it becomes easier for bandits, thieves, and even unscrupulous police and military officers to operate.

== Internally displaced populations ==
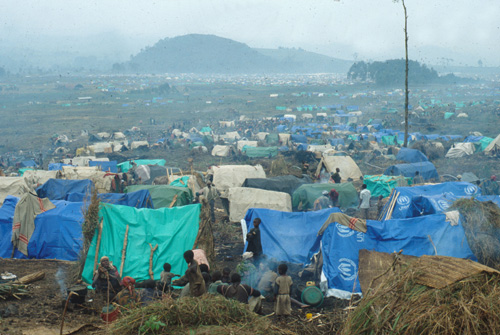
Refugee camp for displaced Rwandans in Kimbumba, 20 km from Goma, Zaire, following the 1994 Rwandan genocide

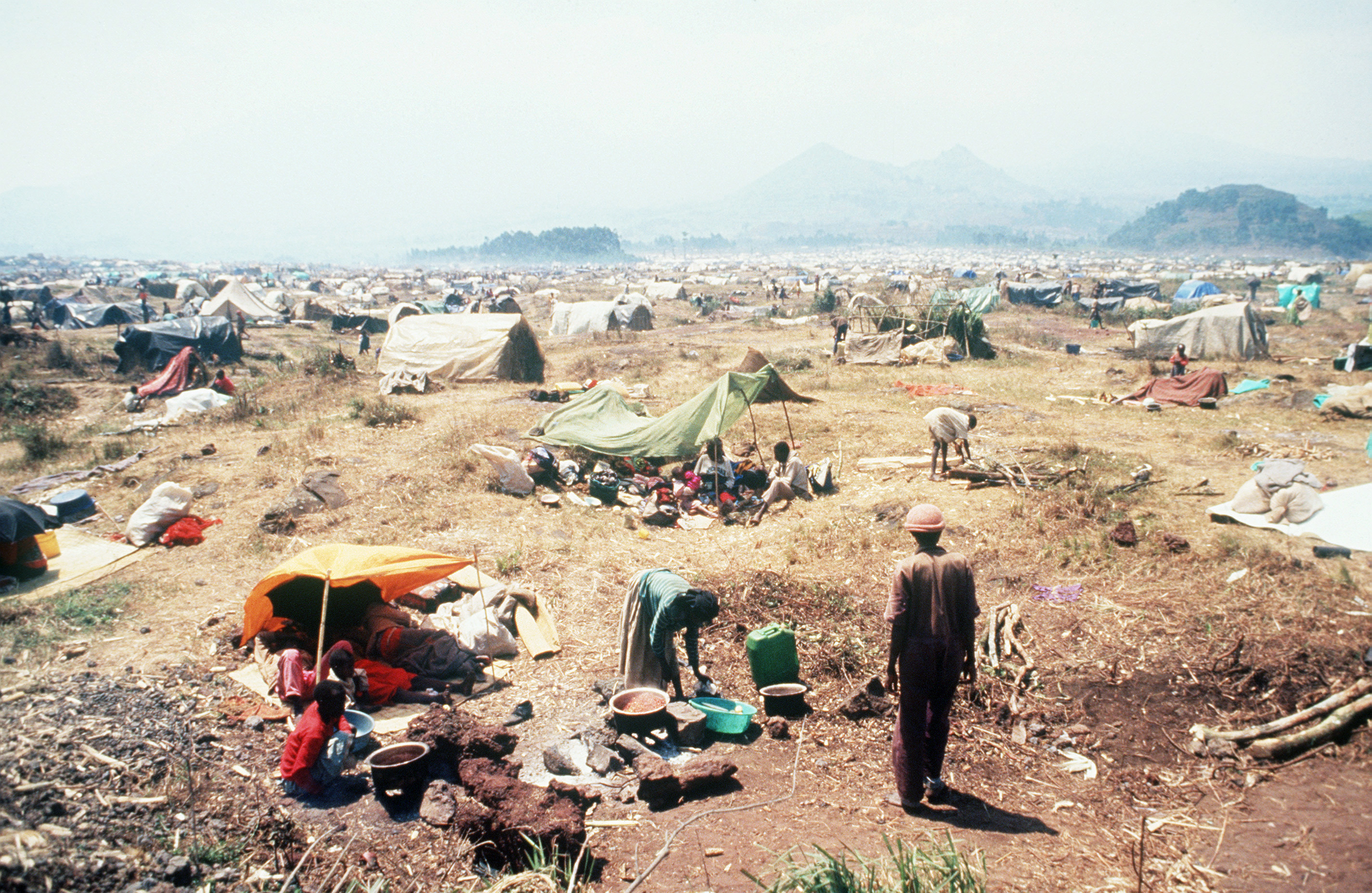
Kibumba refugee camp in Goma on August 3, 1994. Approximately 1.2 million Rwandan refugees fled to Zaire following the outbreak of the Rwandan Civil War.

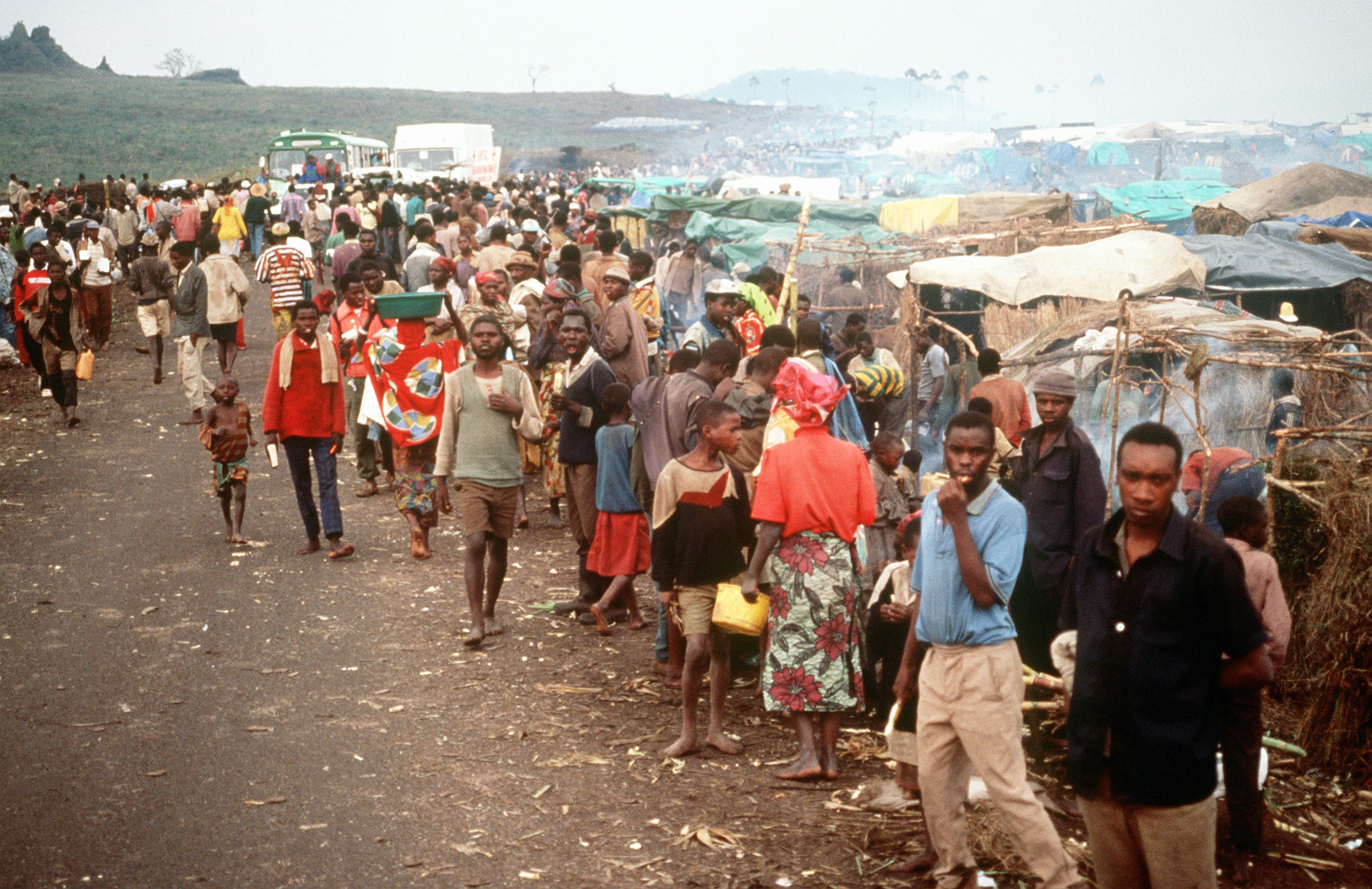
Refugee camp near Goma, Zaire, 1994, providing shelter to those fleeing the Rwandan Civil War.

For over three decades, Goma has served as a major site for internally displaced persons (IDPs), predominantly due to the recurrent waves of violence and humanitarian emergencies besieging the eastern Democratic Republic of the Congo and adjacent regions. The displacement crisis commenced in the aftermath of the 1994 Rwandan genocide, during which approximately 1.2 million refugees, predominantly Hutus, entered eastern Congo, with between 500,000 and 850,000 people arriving in Goma over a span of five days in mid-July 1994. This mass migration was one of the largest cross-border movements in recent history, with many refugees establishing makeshift camps around Goma.

The late 1990s witnessed a surge in the IDP crisis amidst the First and Second Congo Wars, with hundreds of thousands fleeing escalating rural violence and relocating to Goma and its environs. By December 2006, estimates suggested at least 80,000 IDPs resided within and around the city, a figure that escalated to roughly 640,000 by September 2007 in camps dispersed across North Kivu. Another spike in displacement transpired between 2012 and 2013, correlating with the emergence of M23. During this period, more than 500,000 people sought refuge in Goma.

The M23 campaign, which involved the M23, the FARDC, and other armed groups across North Kivu, has forced an estimated 1.1 million people from their homes as of 2023, with over 600,000 seeking refuge in severely overcrowded and unsanitary displacement camps around Goma. The 2025 M23 offensives toward Goma and Bukavu generated widespread insecurity, economic disruption, shortages of basic goods, and severe limitations on movement, a situation that was also aggravated by orders from de facto authorities to dismantle IDP camps that forced repeated displacement. A rapid multisectoral assessment carried out by Tearfund in April 2025 examined humanitarian conditions among IDPs in the health zones of Baraka, Mugunga, Mugunga 3, Buhimba, Munigi, and Kanyaruchinya, spanning Goma and the neighboring Nyiragongo Territory. The assessment identified 43 active "collective centers" hosting 2,263 displaced households, approximately 11,950 individuals, primarily concentrated in Goma and Karisimbi communes as well as in Nyiragongo Territory, with particularly high concentrations in Mugunga, Mugunga 3, Buhimba, Baraka, Munigi, Rusayo, and Kanyaruchinya. Some of the largest sites, often churches or schools, were sheltering more than 1,000 people, while approximately one quarter of displaced households were hosted by local families.

=== Cholera, dysentery outbreaks, and malnutrition ===
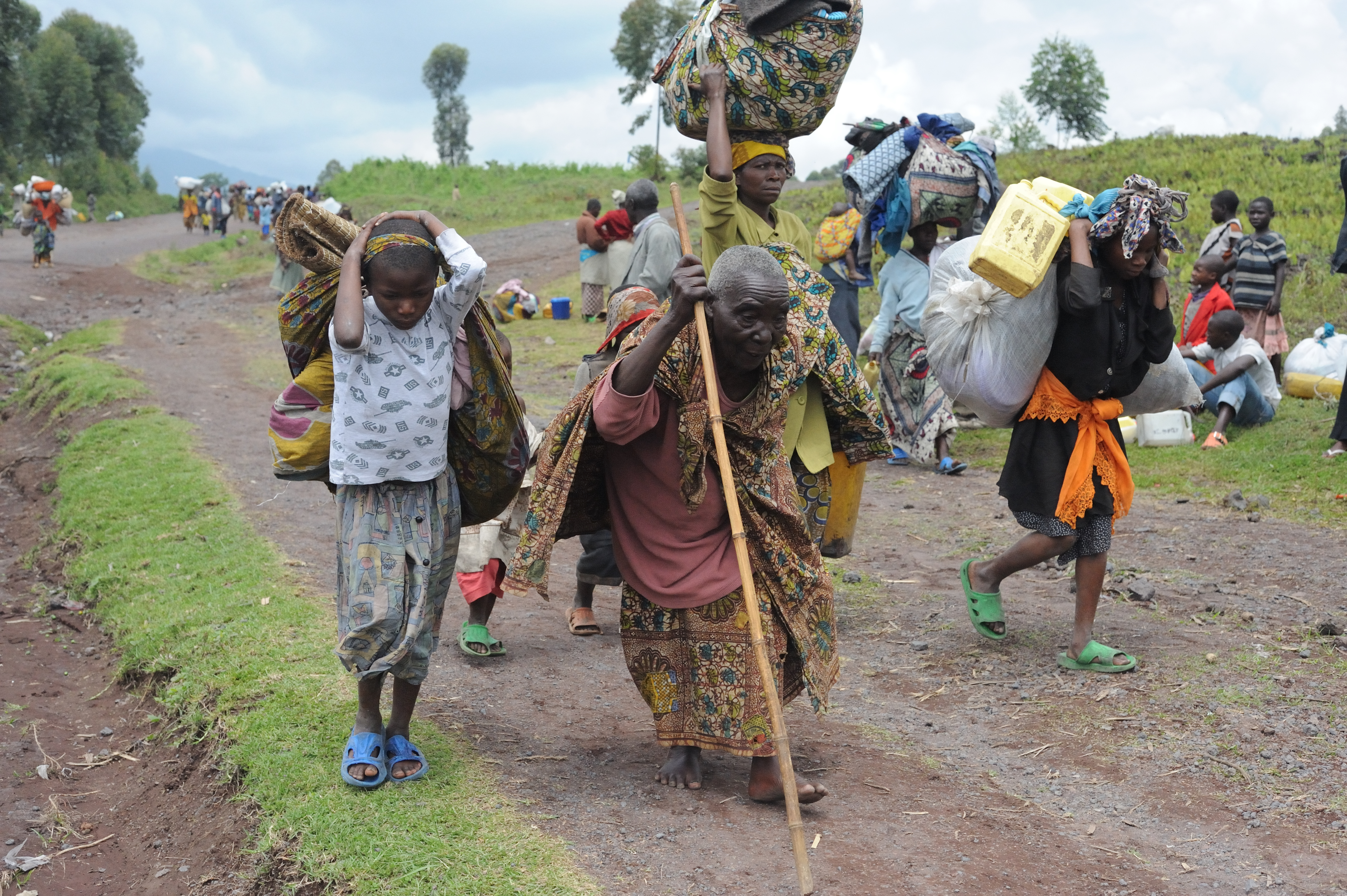
Kibati villagers fleeing gunfire in a camp for internally displaced persons during the 2008 Nord-Kivu war

The initial influx of refugees in July 1994 saw an immediate health emergency, as overcrowded camps lacked clean water, sanitation, and hygiene facilities. The first case of cholera was diagnosed on 20 July 1994, leading to a major outbreak within the camps that saw an estimated 58,000 to 80,000 cases in less than a month. Concurrently, an outbreak of bloody diarrhea caused by Shigella dysenteriae type 1 emerged in early August, persisting in the camps until November. These outbreaks contributed to unprecedented mortality rates during the first month of the emergency, with an estimated 50,000 deaths recorded between mid-July and mid-August.

The influx also led to severe food insecurity among IDPs, resulting in widespread malnutrition, particularly affecting children. Goma's already fragile health infrastructure struggled to meet these needs, as ongoing conflict limited resources and disrupted supply chains. Many displaced families lacked access to sufficient food, and local health services were ill-equipped to address the scale of malnutrition.

Between January 2000 and December 2007, cholera remained a persistent threat in North and South Kivu, with 73,605 reported cases and 1,612 deaths, resulting in a lethality rate of 2.2%. In North Kivu, the cholera strains identified included Vibrio cholerae O1 El Tor Ogawa and Inaba, with the latter being exclusive to South Kivu. Annual cholera outbreaks peaked at over 700 cases per week, particularly affecting health districts bordering lakes. Despite the severity of these outbreaks, between January and April 2002, only 140 cholera cases were reported across Goma, with no fatalities, a significant deviation from the city's typical average of 29 cases weekly for that period.

=== Mental health, nutritional challenges, and recent health crises ===
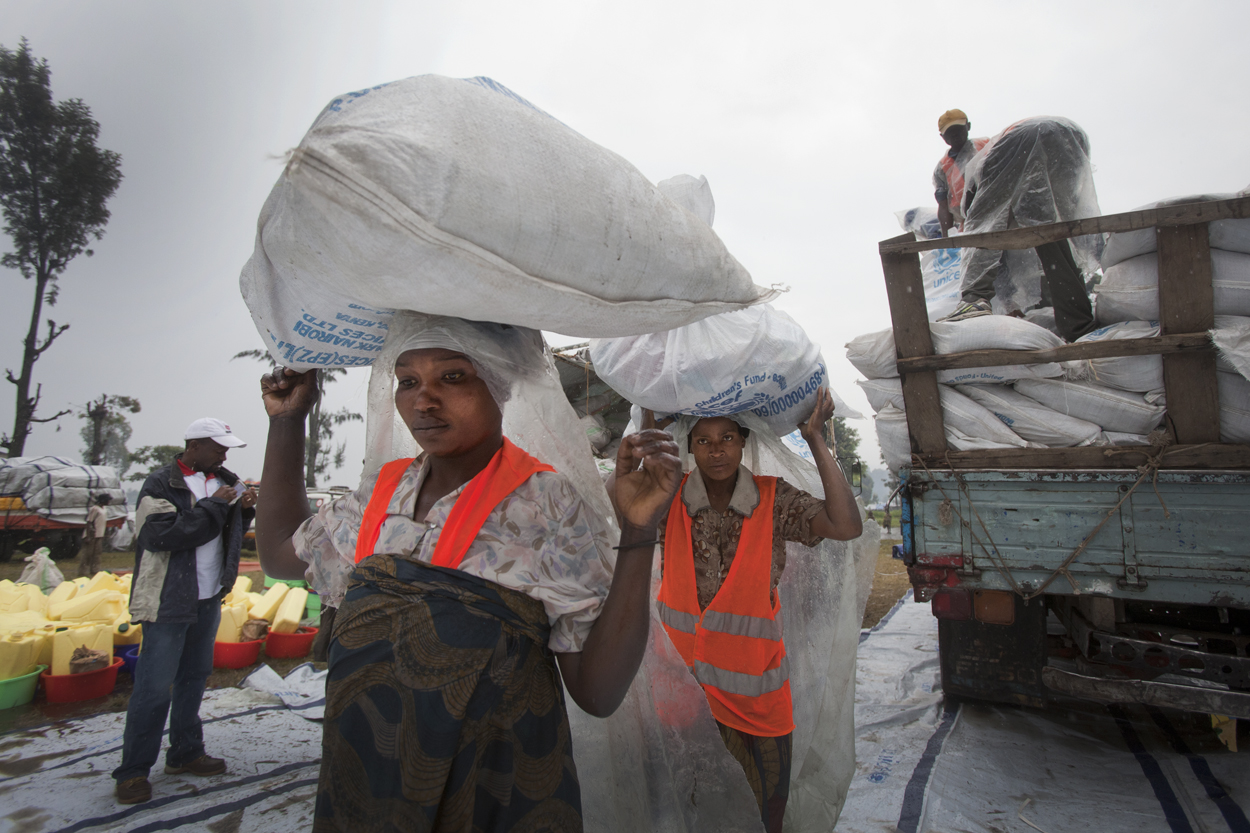
Food rations unloaded from trucks at the Kanyaruchinya IDP camp, located on the outskirts of Goma

In 2012, nearly 1 million children in the Democratic Republic of the Congo were estimated to suffer from acute malnutrition, with North Kivu being particularly affected. Food shortages also hindered access to adequate nutrition for IDPs. Continuous exposure to violence and trauma led to pervasive mental health issues, including anxiety, depression, and post-traumatic stress disorder (PTSD), with limited mental health support available in the region.

From 2016 to 2022, the recurring conflicts and subsequent displacements in Goma worsened the health crisis, with recurrent outbreaks of communicable diseases such as cholera, measles, and a resurgence of malaria. Overcrowded and unsanitary conditions within IDP camps facilitated the spread of these diseases, and resulted in high morbidity and mortality rates. The COVID-19 pandemic also intensified health challenges for IDPs, as healthcare systems became severely strained and limited access to treatment and vaccination. IDPs were particularly vulnerable to severe COVID-19 outcomes due to overcrowded conditions and insufficient health resources. As of June 14, 2026, the Democratic Republic of Congo reported 782 confirmed cases of the Bundibugyo strain of Ebola, with Goma identified as a key area of concern. During this outbreak, medical teams in Goma faced significant mistrust from relatives of victims.

=== Sexual violence ===
The conflict has been accompanied by a sharp rise in gender-based violence. Armed groups, local militias, and, at times, even some members of state forces have been implicated in sexual violence against civilians. Such violations are often weaponized as a deliberate tool of war to terrorize communities, assert control, and break down social cohesion. Survivors often face physical injuries, sexually transmitted infections, psychological trauma, and social stigma. A 2007 study revealed that around 1.69–1.80 million women aged 15–29 in the DRC reported experiencing sexual assault at some point in their lives, with North Kivu recording 223,262 cases, the highest rate nationally. 2010 research indicated that 39.7% of women in North and South Kivu had experienced sexual violence.

In 2023, Médecins Sans Frontières (MSF) reported a sharp increase in sexual violence cases in the DRC, mainly concentrated in and around Goma. MSF treated 25,166 survivors nationwide, averaging more than two patients per hour. Between 17 and 30 April 2023, Médecins Sans Frontières treated 674 survivors of sexual violence in camps such as Bulengo, Lushagala, and Rusayo, including 360 cases recorded in Rusayo alone, a recently created and densely populated site west of Goma. The majority of victims were attacked while outside the camps searching for essential resources, and access to cash has been cut off as banks no longer operate under M23 control. In the first five months of 2024 alone, MSF treated 17,363 survivors in North Kivu, representing 69% of the total cases treated across five provinces in the previous year.

==== Medical literature, demographics, and medical treatment ====
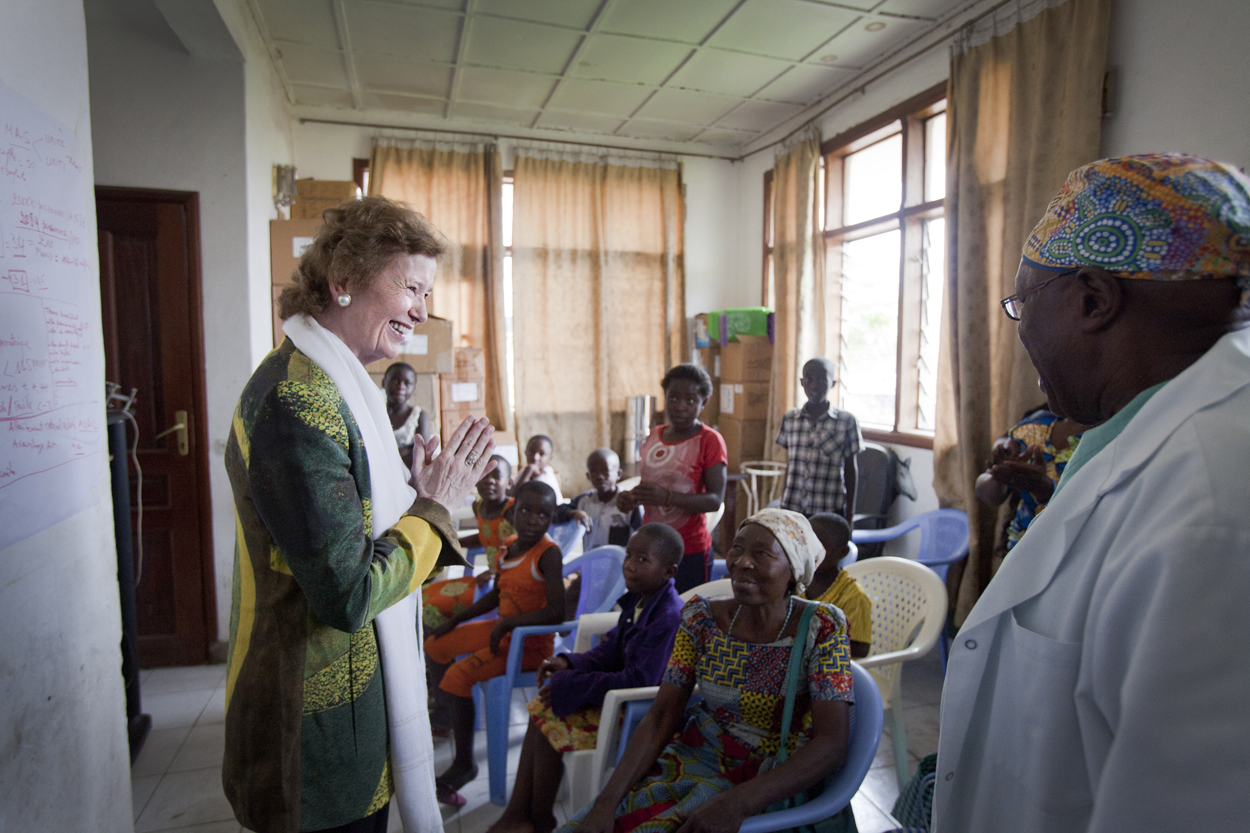
Mary Robinson, United Nation Special Envoy for the African Great Lake Region, meets with victims of sexual violence at Heal Africa's hospital in Goma

Despite substantial media coverage, sexual violence within the DRC remains insufficiently addressed in medical literature. A study conducted in Goma from 2013 to 2017 revealed that sexual violence disproportionately affected females below 18 years, with an average age of 16.5 years. Half of the perpetrators were known to the survivors; 12% of survivors tested positive for pregnancy, and 43% received emergency contraception.

In a separate study covering January 2019 to December 2020, Karisimbi municipality in Goma reported 551 cases of sexual violence, while the Goma municipality recorded 149 cases. The Majengo neighborhood in Karisimbi reported the highest frequency, with 129 cases. Among the survivors, women aged 20–29 represented 28.6%, with only 15.7% reporting incidents occurring within their homes, and 60.7% of incidents involved the use of weapons.

Vaginal assault occurred in all cases, and other forms of assault, like touching, occurred in 7.2% of cases. Strangers constituted 64.7% of the perpetrators, and 61.4% of assailants were identified as members of military or police forces. Among survivors, 8.1% had a physical disability. Of the 700 survivors, only 16.1% sought medical consultation for genital injuries, and 0.7% presented with mutism. Approximately 60.6% sought medical care within 72 hours, with 8.1% testing positive for HIV. Of the survivors, 76.3% underwent pregnancy tests, 6.4% of which were positive. Additionally, 55.4% of survivors received contraception, and 91.1% were offered post-exposure prophylactic treatment for HIV.

== Culture ==
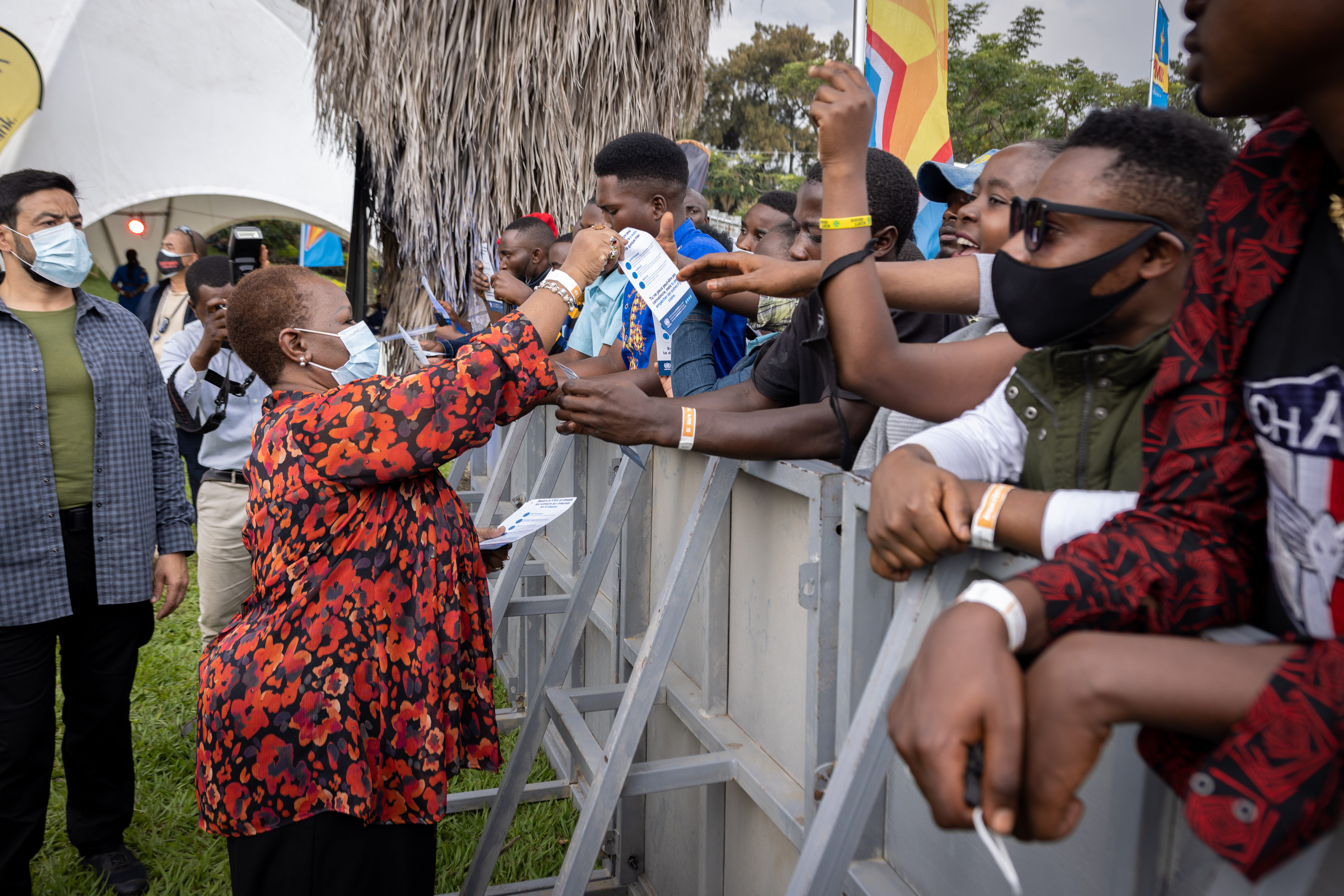
Bintou Keita at the Amani Festival

Goma is home of the annual Festival Amani which celebrates peace; in 2020, it attracted an audience of 36,000. Goma serves as the North Kivu's cultural center and has a vibrant entertainment and performing arts scene that encompasses various media forms, including television productions, radio broadcasts, theatre, cinematic expressions, multimedia installations, and print publications.

Like many cities in DRC, Goma is known for its music scene with popular genres such as soukous, Congolese rumba, ndombolo, and Jazz. Notable figures in Goma's popular culture scene include Innoss'B, Jonathan Kuminga, Rebecca Kabugho, Anzor Alem, Ley Uwera, Petna Ndaliko Katondolo, Alicios Theluji, El Weezya Fantastikoh, Christophe Madihano, Patient Ligodi, Voldie Mapenzi, Mista Faba, Belamy Paluku, and Willow Miller.

=== Entertainment and performing arts ===
During the 1970s, theatrical activities in Goma flourished, with well-organized theater troupes such as AMIKI (Amis du Kivu) with Kembo and Mazingi, CLB with Tshiaba, Kainos, and Robert De Souza, and Ngoma with Mpozayo Jean-Paul, among others. The shows were held at the city's Ciné Palace hall. Additionally, the Goma Institute organized a school troupe under the leadership of the then-prefect Lumaya Ombwel, featuring talented student actors like Robert De Souza, also known as Kablan or Gilima, and Mwamba, alias Ringo. In March 2013, Goma played host to the inaugural tshukudu race, a wooden bicycle race organized by the United Nations Volunteers (UNV) and Association of Volunteers of Congo (Association des Volontaires du Congo; ASVOCO), which aimed to provide opportunities for the region's unemployed youth and promote peace, with the proceeds benefiting children in Kitchanga.

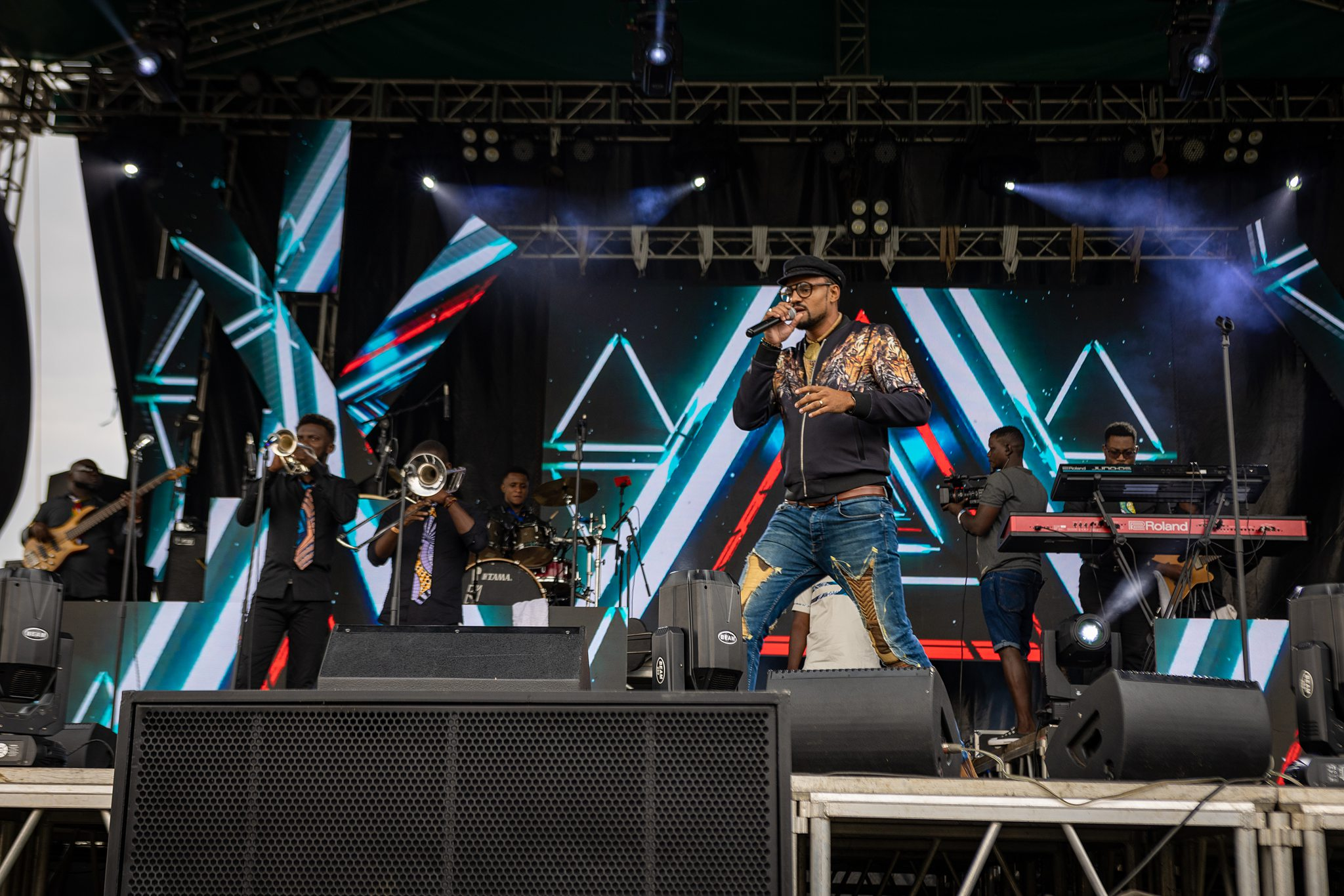
Mohombi at the Amani Festival in 2022

Goma is a hub of art and craftsmanship, with skilled artisans creating intricate wood carvings, pottery, textiles, and jewelry. The city is home to Petna Ndaliko Katondolo's acclaimed multigenre film productions, which embrace a decolonial Ejo Lobi (Afro-futuristic) aesthetic that weaves together historical narratives to confront contemporary sociopolitical and cultural paradigms.

The Foyer Culturel de Goma is the city's most significant cultural center, which plays a pivotal role in nurturing emerging talents, including musicians, poets, thespians, and visual artists, as well as fostering the proliferation and commercialization of indigenous culture and artistic expression within the North Kivu Province. The city also hosts the Amani Festival, a transcultural festival drawing participants from the African Great Lakes region along with international artists and representatives of different ethnic groups from the region. Goma also houses Yole! Africa, a youth cultural center promoting peace through art, music, dance, and film. The renowned spectacle "Au Chemin des Urnes", hosted by the French Institute (IF) of Goma, celebrates the city's poetic, musical, and rhythmic tapestry.

=== Cuisine and handicrafts ===
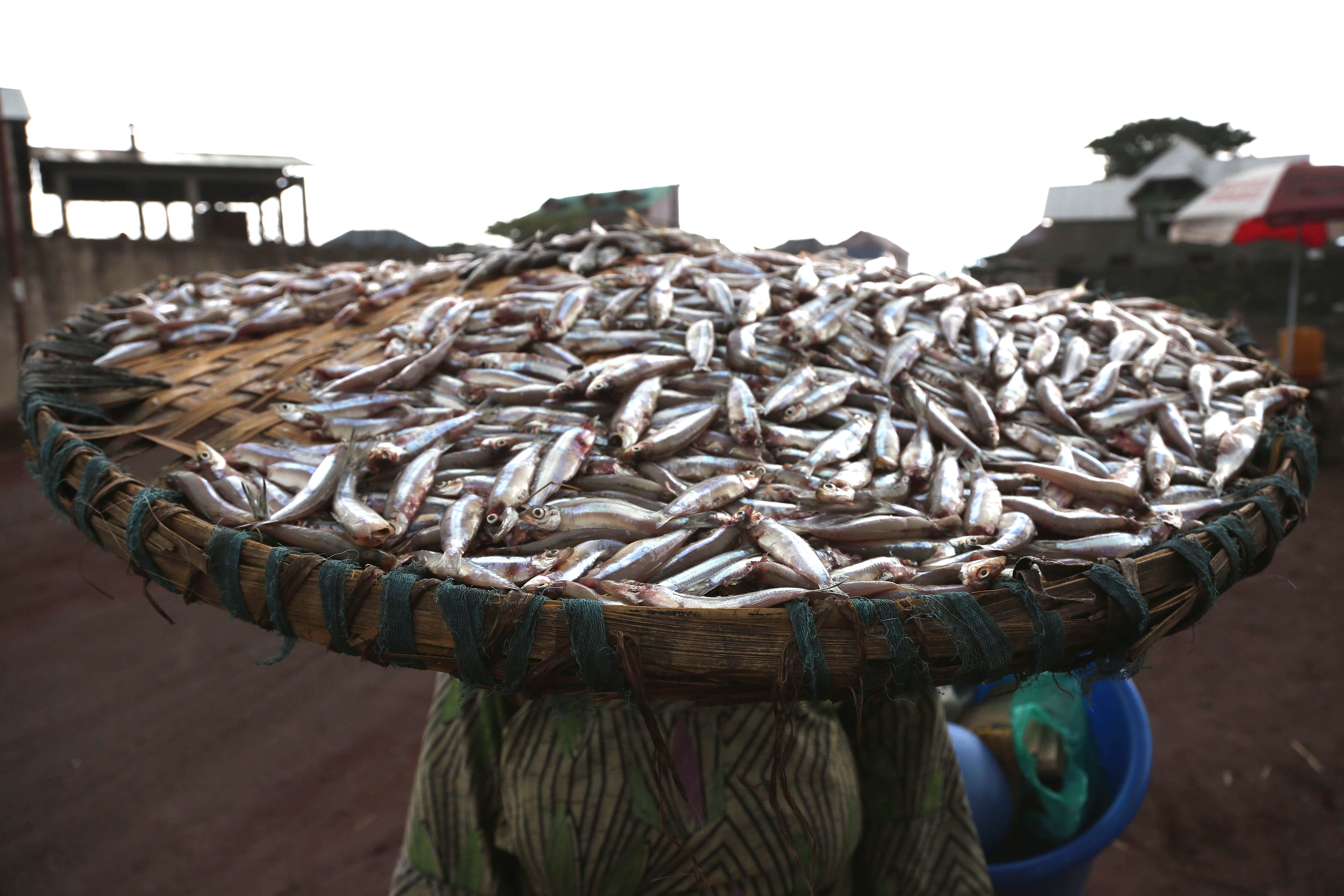
Goma's sambaza are small fish that are traditionally fried and consumed in the region

Cuisine in Goma reflects the region's agricultural abundance and diverse influences. Staple foods include cassava, plantains, maize, and rice, often served alongside a variety of meats, fish, and vegetables. Local specialties such as bugali (a starchy dough), sambaza (small dried fish), and sombe (cassava leaves cooked in peanut sauce) are popular among both residents and visitors.

Art-object sellers are organized under an association known as ASEVENOKI, which brings together more than 45 members. Rather than operating from formal galleries, these artisans exhibit and sell their creations in open-air spaces. Their displays feature a wide range of items, including wooden and ivory figurines, bronze and copper sculptures, rugs crafted from animal hides and plant fibers, masks, lampshades, and antelope-skin vests.

=== Sports ===
Association football is Goma's most popular sport. Prominent football clubs in the city include AS Dauphins Noirs, which competes in Vodacom Ligue 1, the premier division of the Congolese Association Football Federation. Other significant clubs include Daring Club Virunga and Association Sportive Kabasha, both of which participate in Linafoot Ligue 2, an annual competition involving amateur football clubs across the Democratic Republic of the Congo. Matches for these clubs are predominantly held at Stade de l'Unité, the city's primary football venue. Goma also has several other notable sports facilities, including Stade de Mugunga, Stade des Volcans, and Stade Afia.

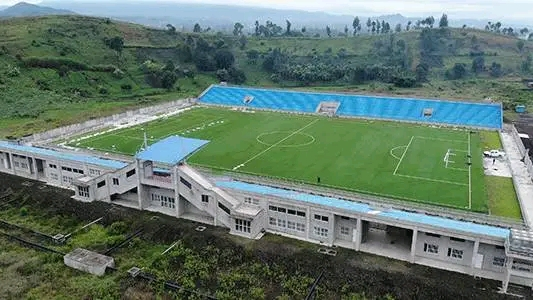
The Stade Mugunga

In addition to football, Goma is home to the Stade Paralympique de Goma, a dedicated basketball stadium that hosts national wheelchair basketball championships.

Boxing plays a significant role in Goma's sports culture, with the city hosting a variety of boxing events, including inter-regional boxing tournaments at the Higher Institute of Commerce of Goma (Institut supérieur de Commerce de Goma; ISC-Goma). In 2015, Goma served as the host city for an inter-regional boxing tournament organized by the brewing company Brasimba of Beni, which attracted both amateur and professional pugilists from Goma, Bukavu, Beni, Butembo, and Rwanda. On 30 June 2024, Goma hosted a Boxing Gala organized by the North Kivu Boxing League to commemorate the nation's independence, featuring participants from North Kivu, South Kivu, and Maniema.

== International relations ==
=== Twin towns and sister cities ===
Goma is twinned with:

- Woluwe-Saint-Pierre, Belgium.

== Notable people ==
- Tuver Wundi, journalist
- Lucie Kamuswekera, artist
- Innoss'B, musician
- Jonathan Kuminga, professional basketball player
- Sinzo Aanza, writer and visual artist
- Rebecca Kabugho, activist
- Anzor Alem, musician
- Ley Uwera, photojournalist
- Petna Ndaliko Katondolo, filmmaker, educator, and ancestral ecologist
- Alicios Theluji, musician
- El Weezya Fantastikoh, musician
- Christophe Madihano, commercial photographer, author, film producer and illustrator
- Patient Ligodi, journalist
- Voldie Mapenzi, musician
- Mista Faba, musician
- Belamy Paluku, musician
- Willow Miller, musician
