= Festival Amani =

Festival in the Democratic Republic of the Congo

- Status: Active
- Genre: Congolese rumba ndombolo Soukous; African music Congolese music World music
- Date: February
- Frequency: Annually
- Locations: Goma, Democratic Republic of the Congo
- Years active: 2013–present
- Inaugurated: 2013
- Founder: Éric de Lamotte and Guillaume Baguma
- Attendance: 35000+
- General Director: Guillaume Bisimwa
- Website: amanifestival.com

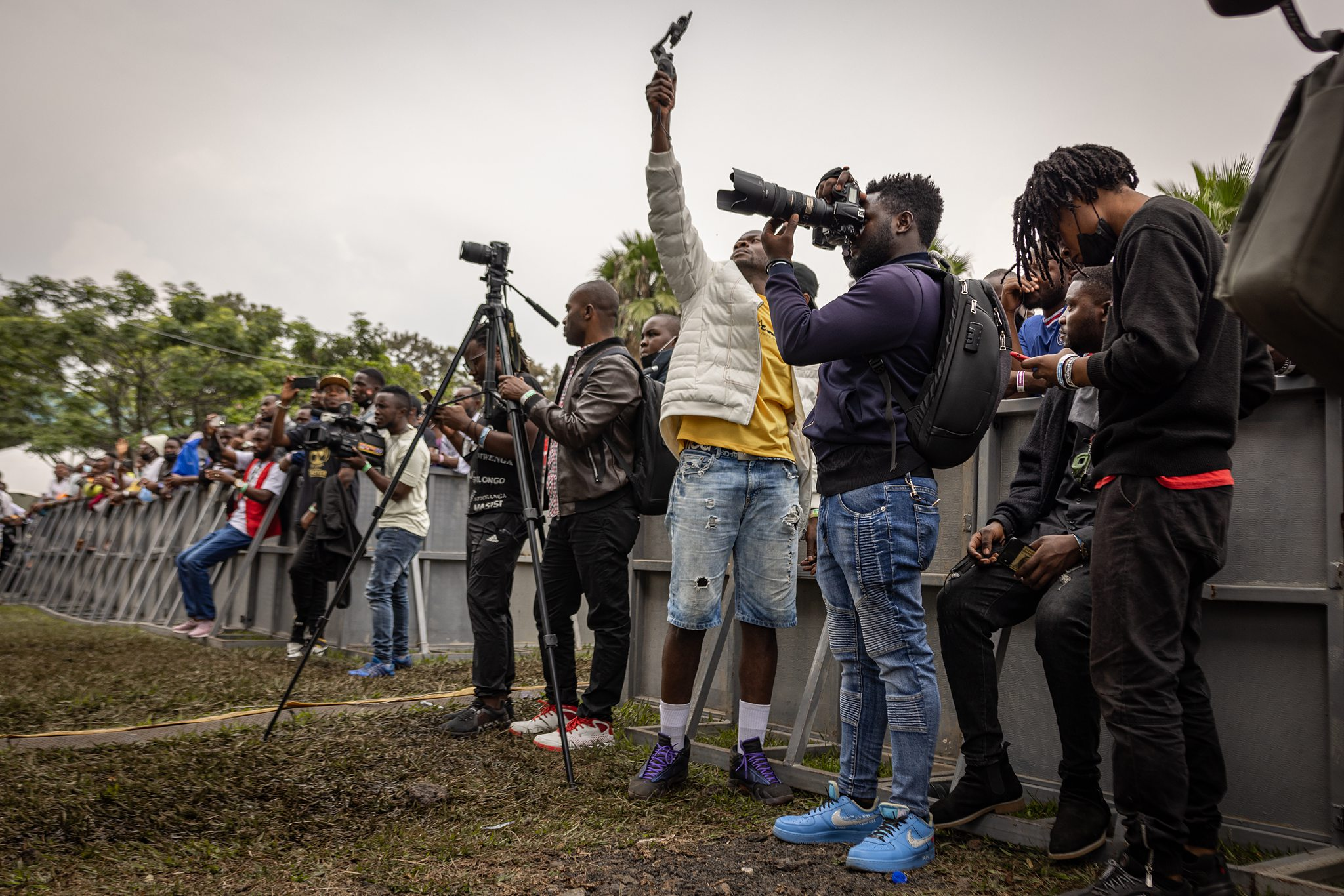
Photographers at the festival

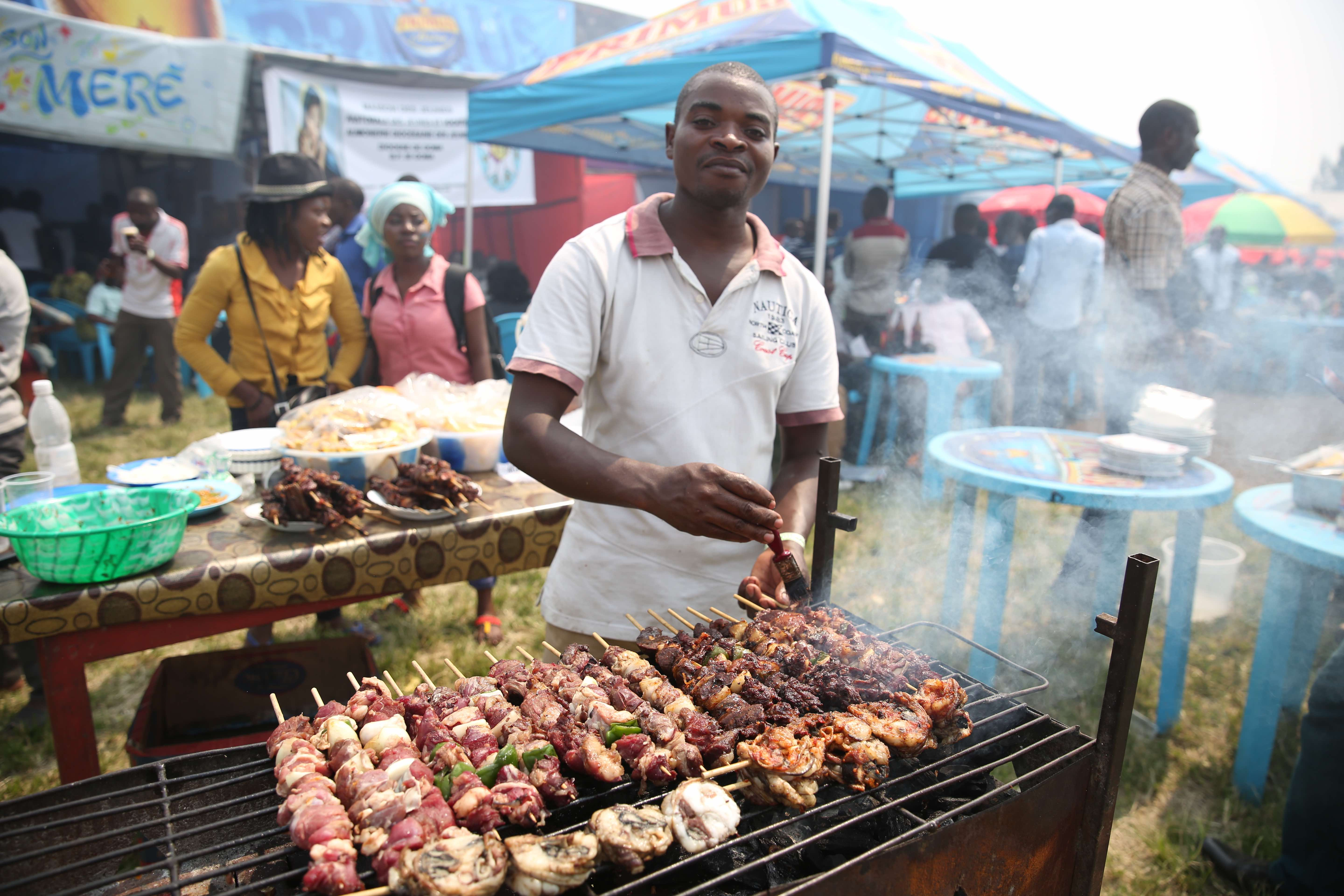
The BBQ grill at the festival

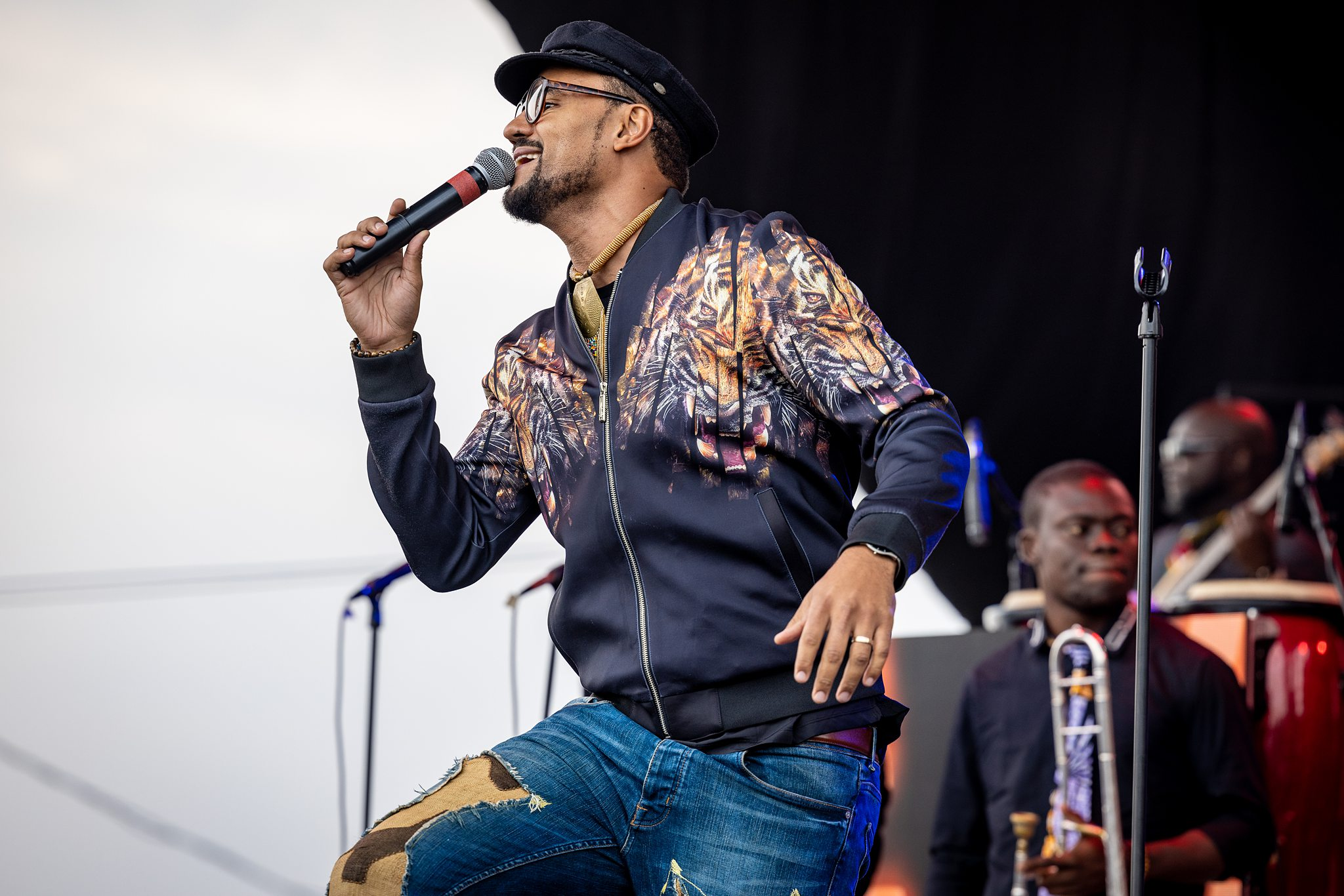
Mohombi at the festival

The Festival Amani is an annual festival that takes place in the context of peacebuilding in the Democratic Republic of Congo and the Great Lakes region. Named after the Swahili word for "peace", the festival brings together thousands of participants each year to celebrate unity through artistic expression.

Organized every February, the three-day festival features music, dance, comedies and other talented artists in Goma.

== Organization ==
The festival is managed by a dedicated team of permanent employees and volunteers, who work throughout the year to ensure its success. They engage in extensive preparation and training, studying other festivals and gaining backstage access to events like the Esperanzah! festival in Belgium. Three months before the festival, a team of volunteer leaders joins them to coordinate the logistical aspects of the event. Then, 600 volunteers come on board to ensure the execution of the three-day celebration.

=== Activities ===
Various activities are organized leading up to the festival:

Sanaa Weekends: These events, held at the Foyer Culturel de Goma, provide a platform for artistic promotion, featuring singers, dancers, musicians, acrobats, and more performing in front of audiences ranging from 3,000 to 5,000 people every Saturday. Over 200 musical artists and traditional/modern dancers participate, hoping to be selected to perform at the Amani Festival.

Caravanes (street concerts): Organized with selected dancers and musicians, these caravans travel through the city's quartiers with selected dancers and musicians, introducing local artists to the population and raising awareness about peace and the festival.

Young Entrepreneurs Competition: This competition focuses on business creation projects with a strong social impact for Goma. It is open to all youths in Goma and offers training opportunities and financial support to ten young entrepreneurs. Four of them receive a zero-rate loan of $1,350, a laptop, and support from the "Kivu Entrepreneurs" incubator for six months, which aims to encourage and support youth entrepreneurship.

Projets artistiques: Financed by the Amani Festival and supervised by the Foyer Culturel de Goma, provide financial support to six local musicians with six artistic projects receiving a donation of $500 each. Musicians from Goma, selected by the community and a jury, present their projects and receive coaching and funding for their realization. The progress and impact of projects launched in 2018 are continuously supervised, with success stories of supported youth shared on social media platforms and the festival's website.

== Amani FM ==
Amani FM radio, which broadcasts live on the Amani festival website and on Pôle FM, a local radio station of Pole Institute, played a crucial role in connecting audiences with the essence of the festival. Pole Institute, which is a non-profit organization engaged in conflict research in the African Great Lakes region, provided a platform for Amani FM to amplify the festival's message of peace and cultural unity. The radio station offered interviews, debates, and production of shows.

It operates across four distinct broadcasts:

- News Live Music: A program showcasing the talent of national, regional, and international artists.
- Tulinde Mazingira: A program focused on environmental conservation.
- Hakiba: A show dedicated to entrepreneurship.
- All Together: A chronicle capturing the spirit of unity and collaboration at the festival.

== History ==
The idea of organizing an extensive music and dance festival came from the trainers and directors of the Foyer Culturel de Goma whose aspiration was to foster peace, cultural appreciation, and peaceful coexistence within the region. According to Music in Africa, Guillaume Baguma and Éric de Lamotte, who have been meeting regularly in Goma for years, conceived the idea. The festival was dubbed Amani, which means "peace" in Swahili. This idea took shape following the success of the Sanaa weekend, a showcase for promoting up-and-coming talents such as musicians and actors from Goma trained at the center.

Initially inexperienced in organizing a large-scale event that could draw more than 30,000 people, the trainers and youth cohorts decided to take the first step and made it a great success. Supported by the United Nations Volunteers, who offered technical and logistical help, and the United Nations Development Programme, which provided $15,000 for artist transportation, the first edition was organized for 30–31 August and 1 September. However, due to prevailing security concerns in North Kivu, the event was postponed to February 2014, a decision taken in conjunction with local authorities. On 31 August 2013, the scheduled performers, including Lexxus Legal, redirected their talents to a solidarity concert in Kinshasa, hosted at the Centre Wallonie-Bruxelles à Kinshasa, an offshoot of the Wallonia-Brussels Federation, administered by Wallonia Brussels International.

=== 1st edition 2014 ===
The festival's first edition was held from 14–16 February 2014, in Goma at the Kwa Kesho Bora Village. The event was supported by the attendance of 63 local and international non-governmental organizations and 400 volunteers. Notable highlights included a masterclass conducted by Lokua Kanza.

The festival presented a range of internationally recognized artists and native musicians like Lokua Kanza, Lexxus Legal, Innoss'B, Mani Martin, Tonton Lusambo, Fal-J, Jessica Kill, the Matakiyo group, Groupe Folk, Pinochet, Maraben, and Maguru. Martin Kobler, the Special Representative and Head of MONUSCO, lauded the festival as a "soft force which, like water, can move much more than sometimes military force".

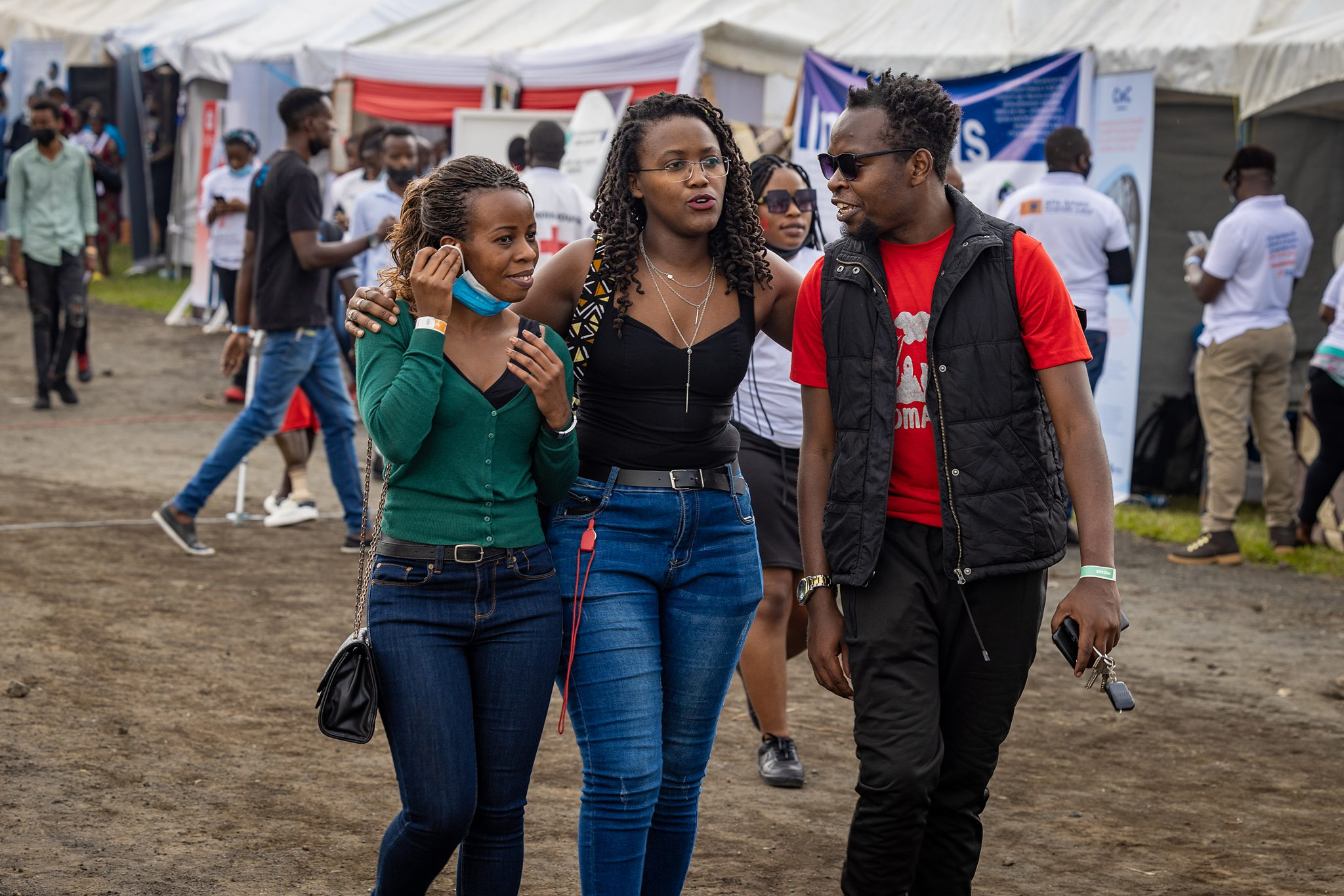
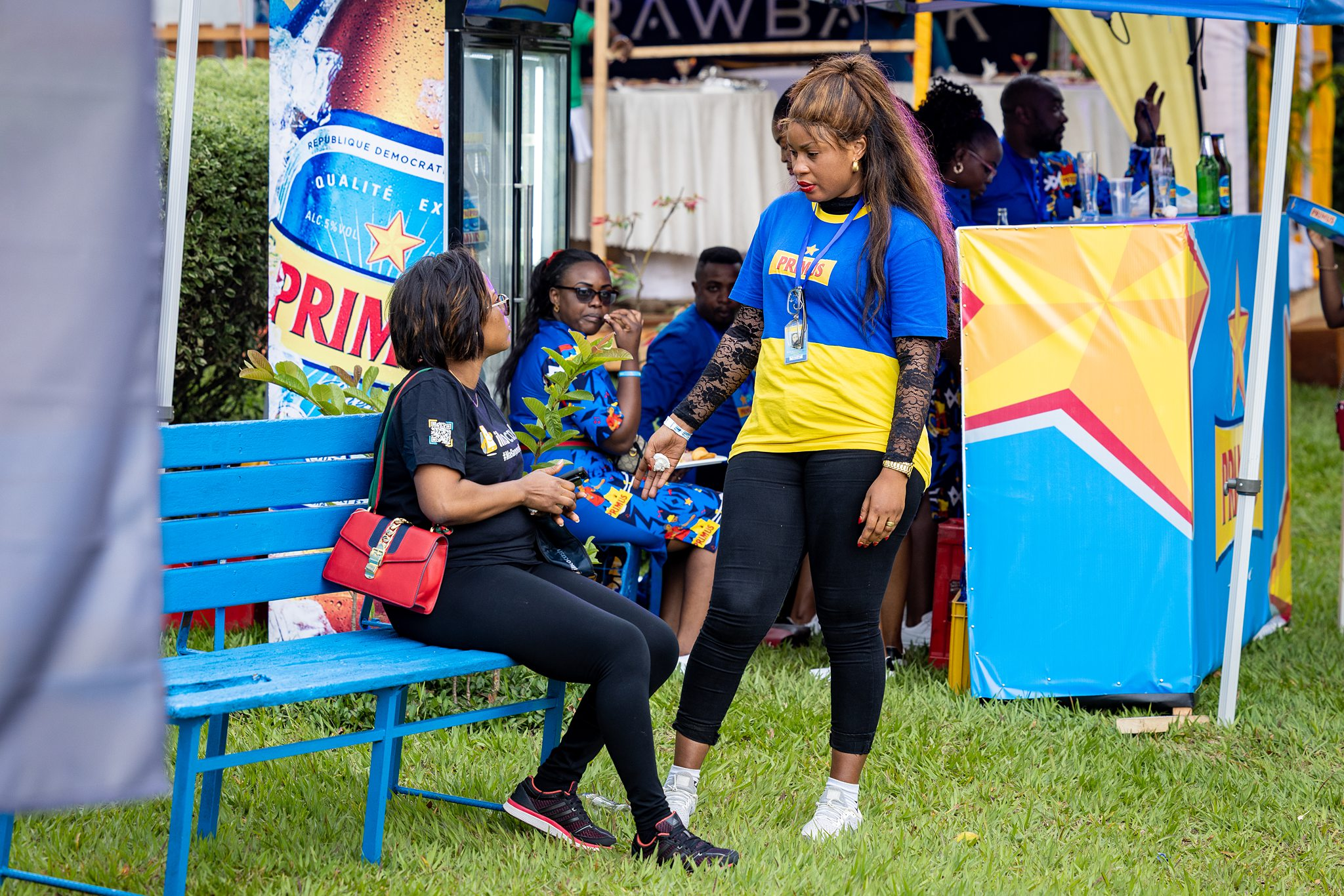
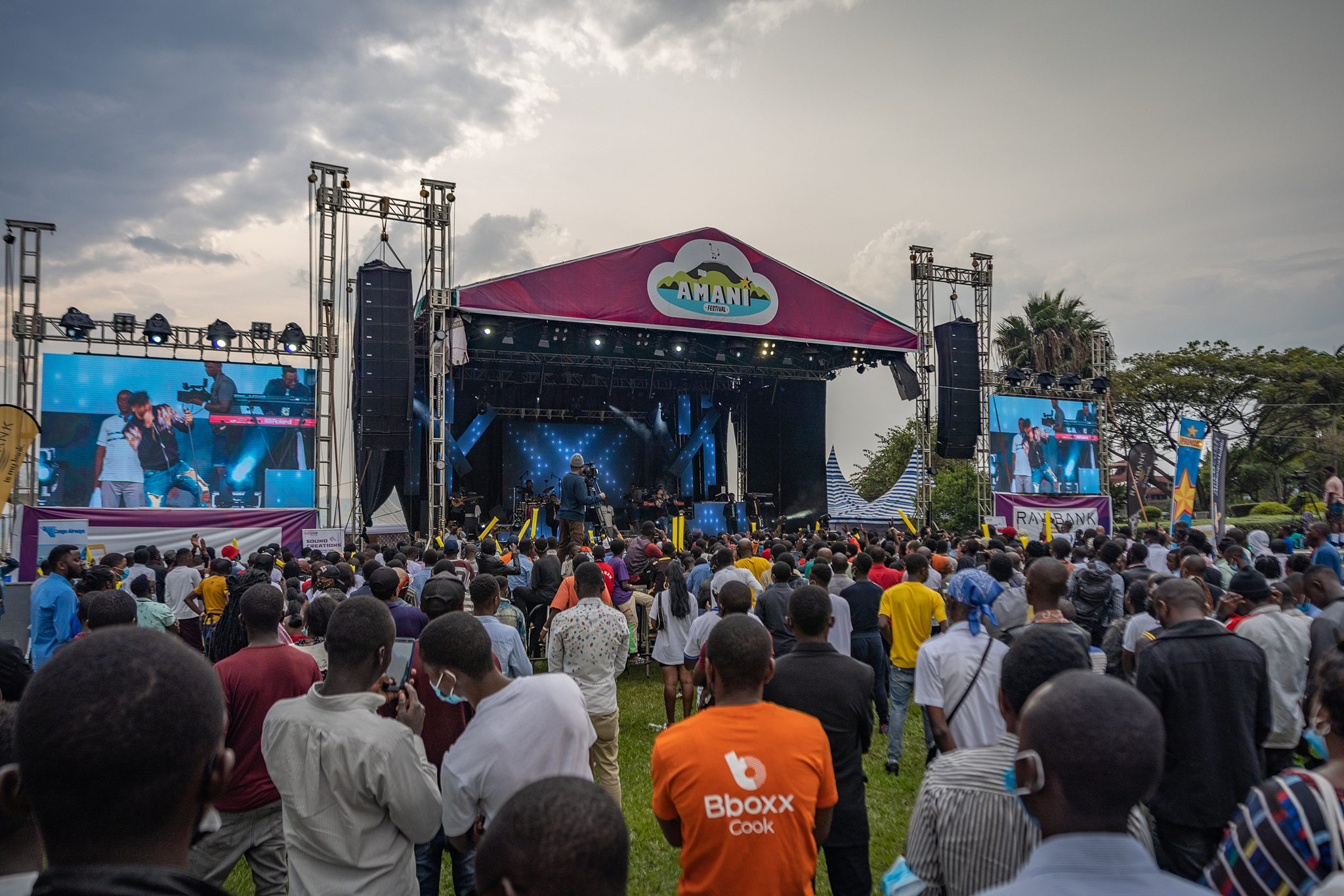
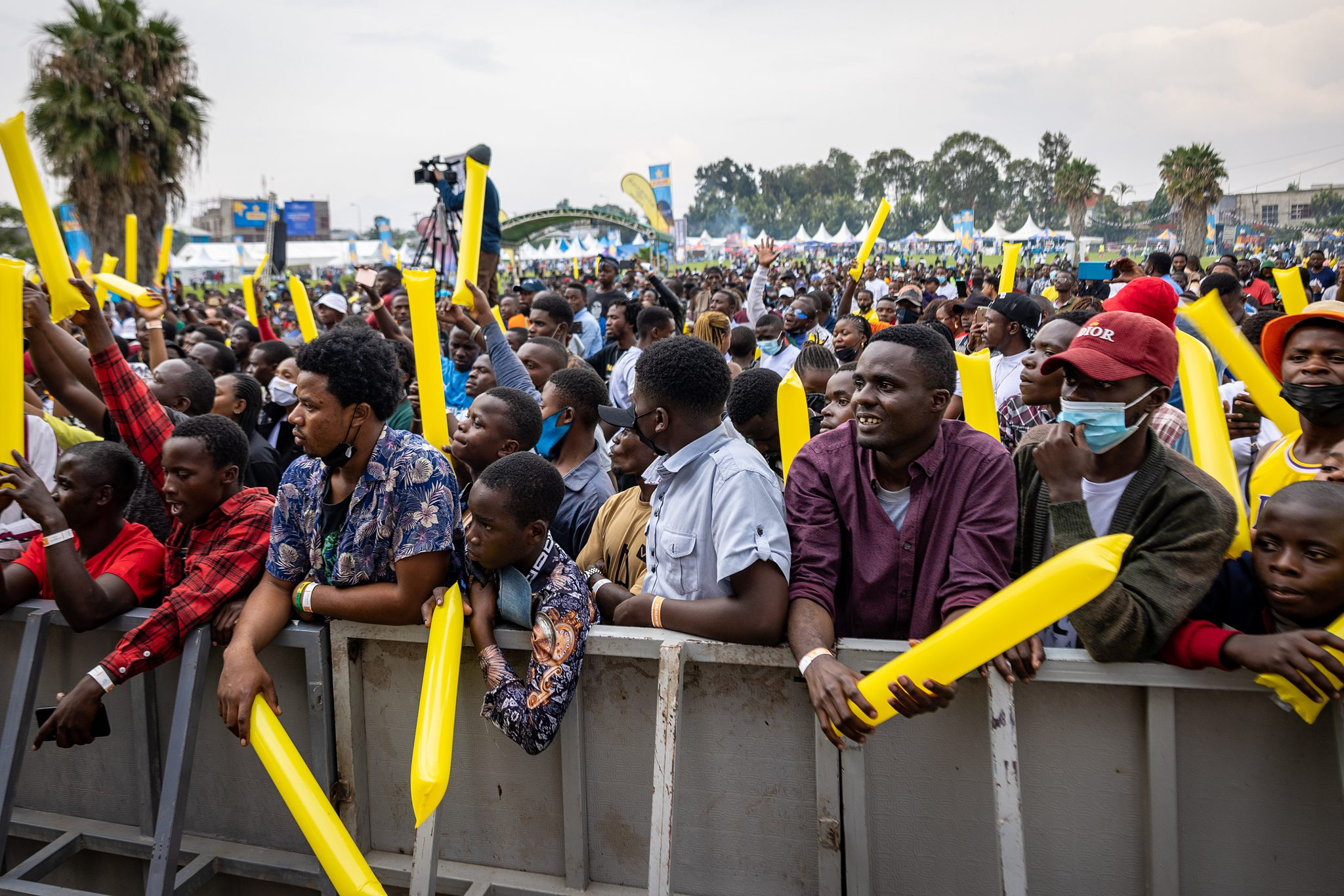
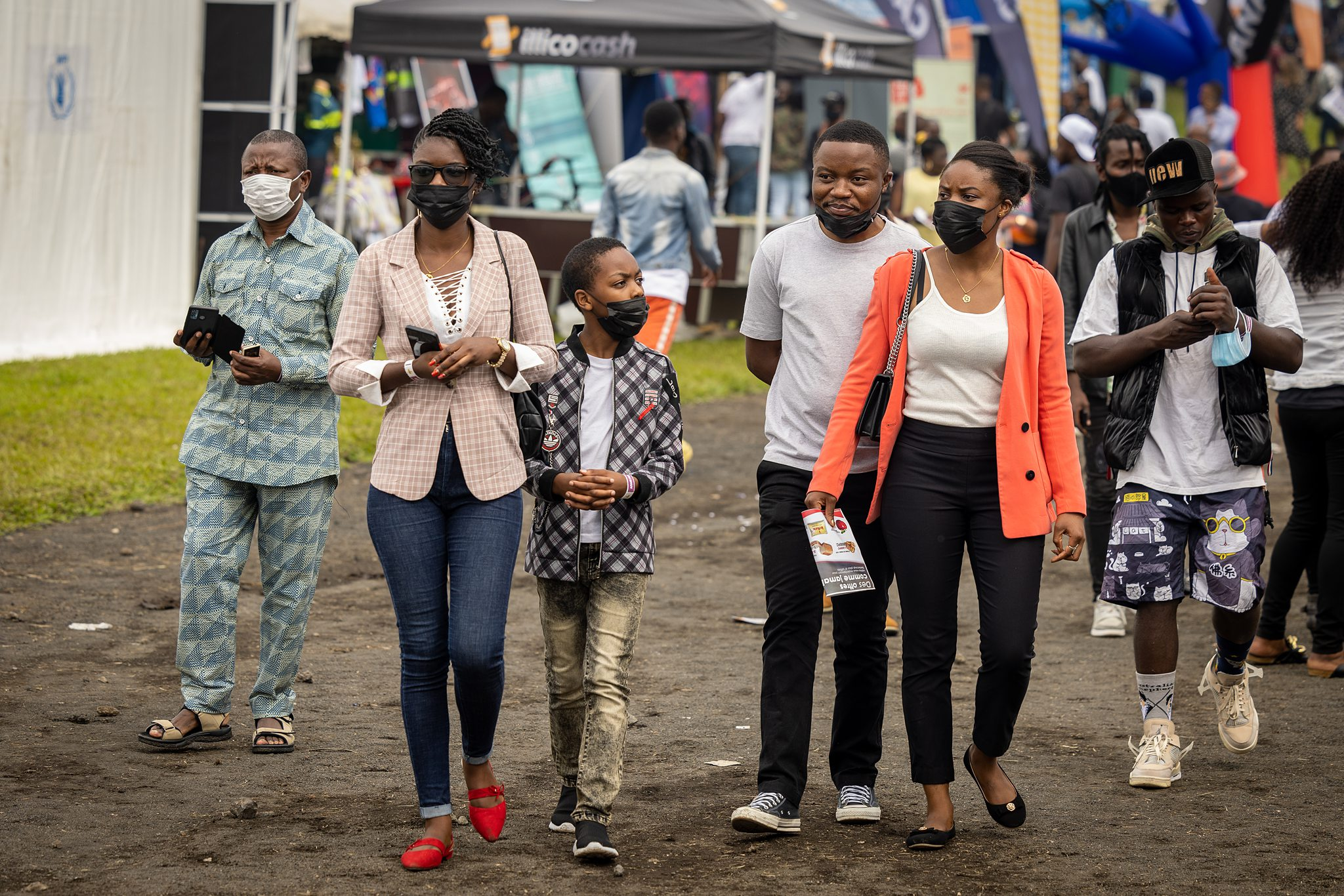
The 8th edition of the Amani Festival 2022

=== 2nd edition 2015 ===
The 2015 second edition transpired 13–15 February. It drew an audience of 29,000 festival-goers and saw the participation of 70 local and international NGOs and 500 volunteers at the Kwa Kesho Bora Village.

Notable artists at the event included: Tiken Jah Fakoly, Habib Koité, Bill Clinton Kalonji, Mani Martin, Mayaya, Junior Grigo, Lion Story, Willy Stone, Mista Faba, Grp Kistanga Tusti "Kahé" and many more.

=== 3rd edition 2016 ===
The 2016 third edition commenced on 12 February and finished on 14 February. It garnered the attendance of 11,000 festival-goers and featured a program comprising 30 musical and dance ensembles, mentorship for ten burgeoning entrepreneurs, allocation of four grants, initiation of four enterprises in Goma, sponsorship for six artists to realize their creative endeavors, engagement of 80 innovative and associative organizations within the Kwa Kesho Bora village, facilitation of four artistic workshops, participation of 510 runners in the Ekiden, and mobilization of 400 dedicated volunteers.

Notable artists at the event included: Nneka, Werrason, Ismaël Lô, Joel Sebunjo, Aly Keïta, Zao, Kode, Yvonne Mwale, Mista Poa, Sango'A, Angel Mutoni, JC Kibombo, Keren, New Young, Jazz Music, Intachogora, Black Man Bausi, Innoss'B, Matakiyo, Keyvoices, and Nsango Mbonda.

=== 4th edition 2017 ===
The fourth edition began on 10 February and wrapped up on 12 February at the Maison Des Jeunes and College Mwanga campuses in Goma. It attracted 34,000 festival-goers and showcased the talents of 23 singers and groups, while providing a platform for 17 traditional and modern dance ensembles and facilitating 70 exhibitors within the associative and entrepreneurial realms. Additionally, the festival awarded 10 grants of $1,000 each to nurture artistic and entrepreneurial endeavors, while fostering camaraderie through a 42 km marathon involving 250 athletes with the aim of creating team spirit and cohesion in businesses.

Notable artists at the event included: Sauti Sol, Jean Goubald Kalala, Yewande Austin, Fabregas Le Métis Noir, Boddhi Satva, DJ Amaroula, Bolivar M'vulu, Franc Issa Le Rossignol, the Life Story Orchestra, Thomas Lusango, Robat King, Magic Pinokio, René Byamungu, Bolivar M'vulu, JKM, Kongoloko, Enrique Makas, Demba, and Mani Martin.

=== 5th edition 2018 ===
The fifth edition commenced on 9 February and concluded on 11 February at College Mwanga in Goma. Drawing approximately 35,500 attendees, the event featured performances by 30 musical artists, traditional and modern dance groups, and acrobats. It also engaged 730 volunteers representing 18 nationalities. Notable features included ten workshops led by international artists for youth in Goma, 28 entrepreneur stands, and the selection of five homegrown artists from Goma to perform at the festival. Moreover, the fifth edition introduced two entrances to enhance accessibility for festival-goers.

Notable artists at the event included: Ferré Gola, Dub Inc, Jupiter & Okwess, Maurice Kirya, Aganze Premier, Zao, Témé Tan, Jose Chameleone, BCUC, Yemba Voice, Ira Irene, Anderson Mukwe, Young B, Dj Damas, DJ USX, Dj Color, CED Koncept, Kerim Kaduro, and others.

=== 6th edition 2019 ===
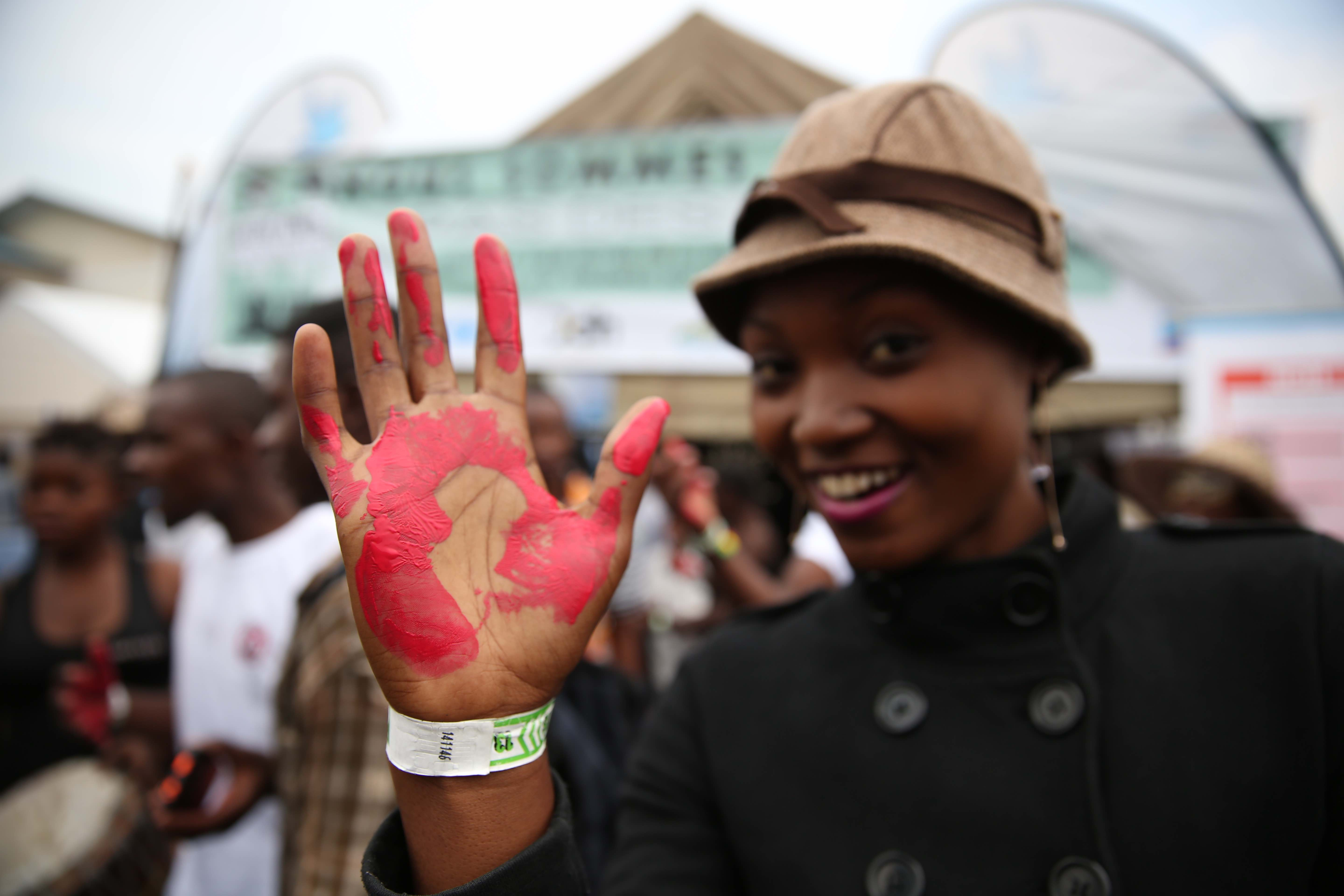
Amani Festival third edition in 2016

The 2019 Amani Festival's sixth edition kicked off on 14 February and closed on 17 February at Mwanga College. It drew 36,000 festival-goers and featured 75 entrepreneurial and NGO stands, with 810 volunteers from 13 different nationalities.

It boasted an eclectic lineup of artists: Fally Ipupa, Youssoupha, Baloji, Ruth Tafébé, Lady Jaydee, Alisheur Amouly, Joly Malonga, Nkento Bakaji, Alif Naaba, Mortal Combo, Yvan Buravan, Infrappa, Knowless, Gaël Faye, Dj Spilulu, DJ Alec Lomami, T- Saint Arrow, Kareyce Fotso, Nasfi Power, Life Song, Anick Michael, BCUC, La Monteska, among others.

=== 7th edition 2020 ===
The 2020 seventh edition began on 14 February and wrapped on 16 February at Mwanga College. Over 36,000 people attended in defiance of an increase in violence in the area. The festival opened with a Congolese interpretation of Wolfgang Amadeus Mozart's Requiem. M'bilia Bel was one of the headline performers and she include hits "Mpeve ya Longo" and "Yamba Nga".

Other artists in attendance included: Faada Freddy, Didier Awadi, Professor Jay, Innoss'B, Dobet Gnahoré, Gaz Mawete, Euforquestra, Céline Banza, Serge Cappuccino, UsX & Izoard, Grand Mike Jazz, Alphaz, Honoman, Glomaneka, SLM, Bill Ruzima, Ndaane, Kris Dane, Slam, among others.

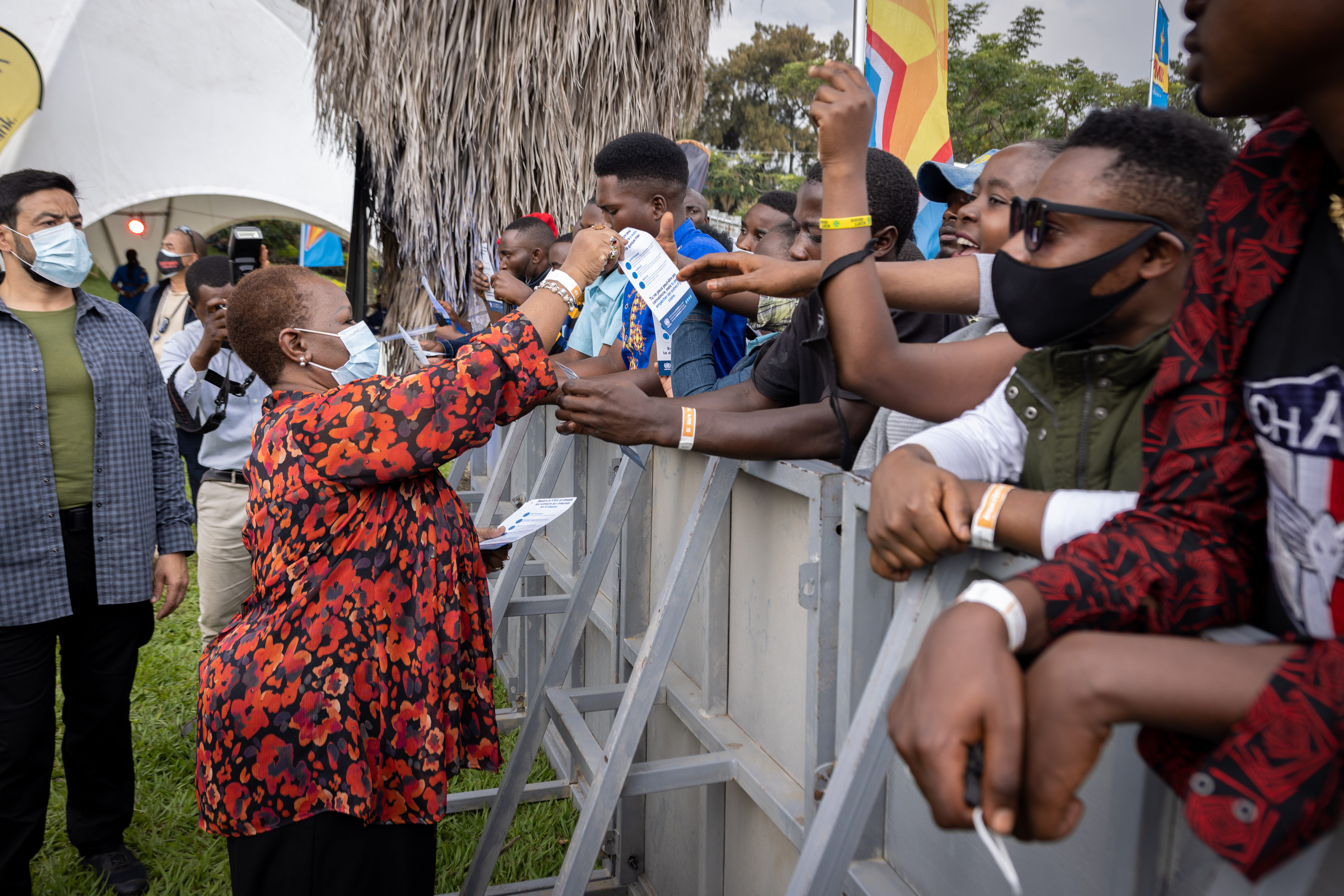
Bintou Keita at the Amani Festival in 2022

=== 8th edition 2022 ===
The eighth edition was initially planned for 4–6 June 2021. However, due to the state of siege prompted by security concerns and the COVID-19 pandemic in the Democratic Republic of the Congo, it was postponed to 4–6 February 2022, in Kituku in the Kyeshero quartier of Goma commune. It attracted a crowd of more than 30,000 festival-goers, along with various UN Agencies and NGOs. Due to Goma's ranking as the second city in the DRC after Kinshasa in terms of COVID-19 cases and deaths, North Kivu expanded the vaccination program at the event to promote vaccination awareness. Bintou Keita, the Special Representative of the UN Secretary-General, was present, distributing leaflets to caution people against COVID-19 misinformation on social media.

Notable artists at the event included: W. Malick, Afande Ready, Mohombi, Roga Roga, among others.

=== 9th edition 2023 ===
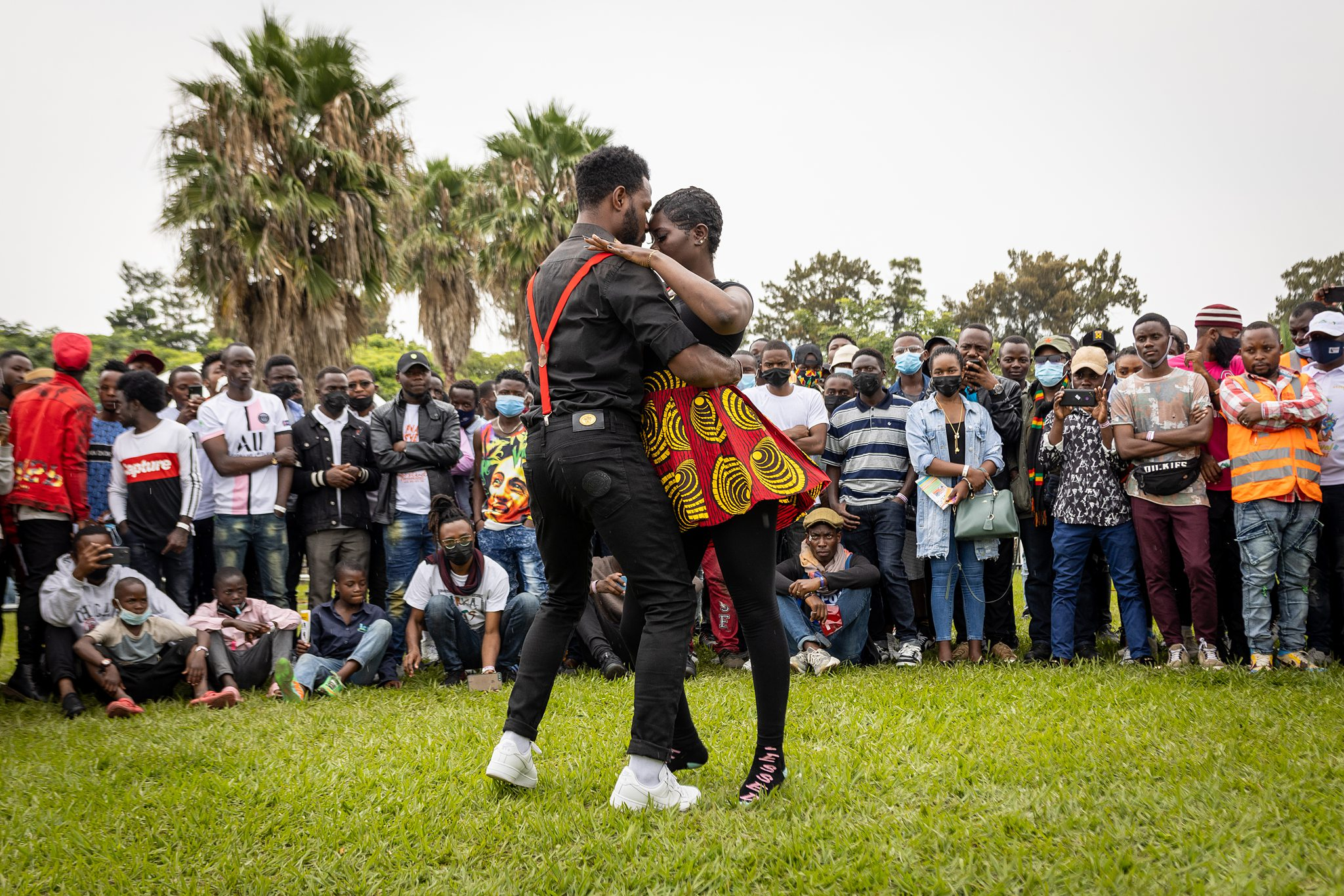
Couples dancing to Congolese rumba

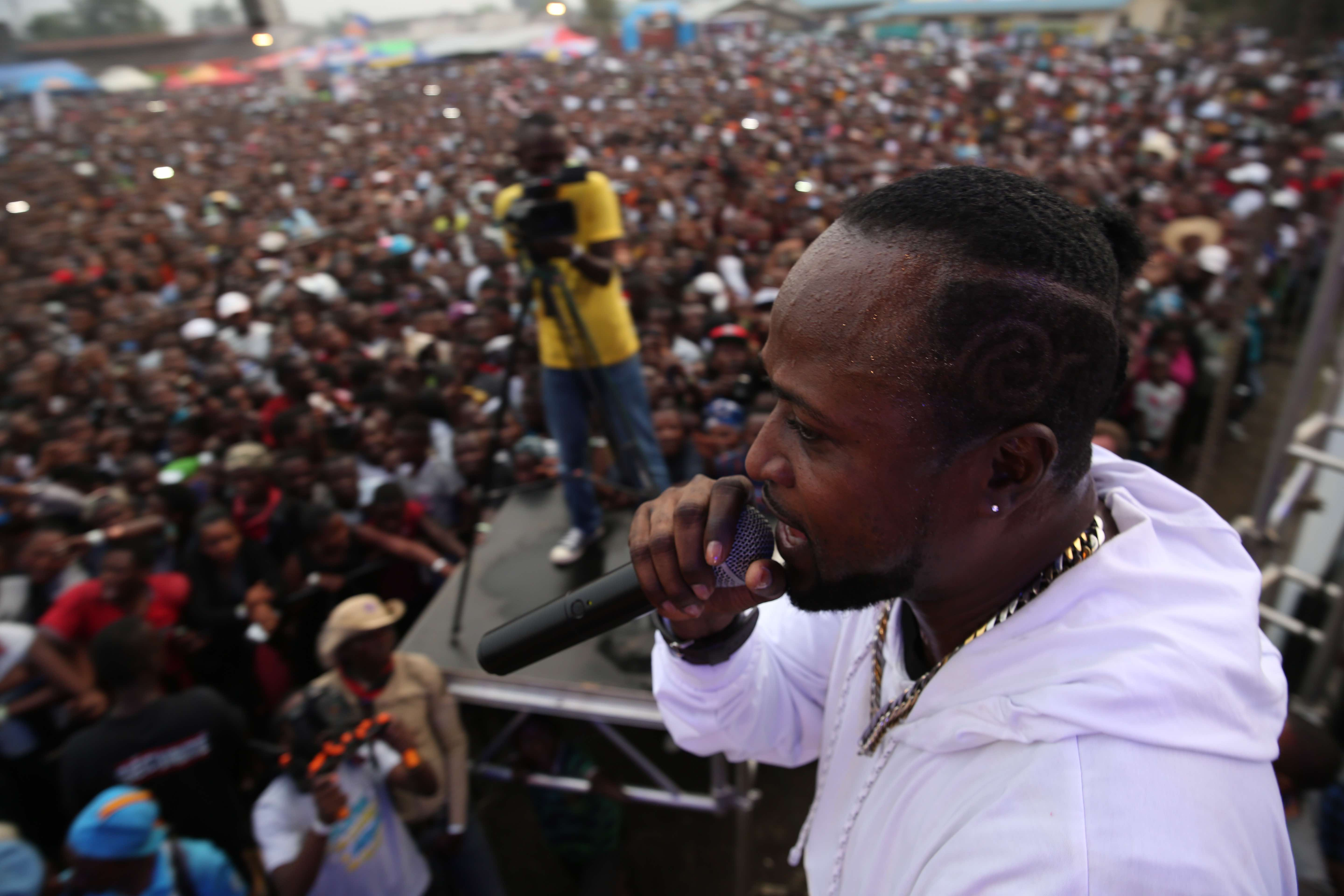
Werrason at the festival

As a precautionary measure for security reasons, the ninth edition was hosted in Bukavu at the Athénée d'Ibanda from 10–12 February 2023, while some ancillary events remained in Goma. It attracted a crowd of over 25,000 festival-goers, alongside various UN Agencies, associations, NGOs, and entrepreneurs.

Eleven artists from Burundi, Rwanda, DRC, and Senegal participated. More than 1,000 children attended the Young Public Space, with 160 project ideas from young entrepreneurs, three of which were financially supported. Innoss'B headlined the event. Following this, artists like Reddy Amisi and the Tanzanian rapper Nay Wa Mitego performed concerts, followed by performances from other artists.

=== 10th edition 2024 ===
Initially scheduled for 14–17 November 2024 in Goma, the 10th edition was canceled by Mayor Kapend Kamand Faustin on 12 November, citing a lack of communication about the event and ongoing regional security challenges. The mayor also banned the Congolese National Movement's protest march against the Amani Festival on 13 November. However, after widespread protests from the MNC, festival organizers, and attendees, the event was authorized and took place from 16–17 November 2024 at the Ihusi Village.

Ferré Gola headlined the event after the withdrawal of several initially scheduled performers, including Franco-Guinean rapper and singer Black M, Jossart N'Yoka Longo, RJ Kanierra, and Yekima De Bel Art. The lineup also included other international and local acts like the Utulivu collective, which collaborated with Burkinabè choreographer Serge Aimé Coulibaly; Danish-Tanzanian musician JJ Paulo; and Congolese singer Voldie Mapenzi. Additional performers included Yosh B, DJ Spilulu, Jessy B, Magic Pinokio, JKM Rambo Kabaya Muvunga, Meshake, Faraja Batumike, Fimbo Kali & Willow Miller, Gingando Pela Paz, La Fanfare du Kivu, Les Rossignols Ténors, Light Future, Lil B Piano, Ngoma Art, Requiem pour la Paix, Step Up Crew, and Ubumwe Folk, among others.

=== 11th edition 2026 ===
After the M23 offensive that seized Goma on 30 January 2025, the 11th edition was moved to Lubumbashi and scheduled for 10–12 April 2026. Augustin Mosange, director of the Foyer Culturel de Goma, stated that organizing the festival in Goma would have posed numerous logistical challenges, particularly because many artists might refuse to travel to a city outside Kinshasa's control. It was organized under the patronage of Prime Minister Judith Suminwa and hosted at the Kiwele Institute with the theme "Becoming Again" (Redevenir). The lineup included artists such as Ferré Gola, Youssoupha, RJ Kanierra, Boddhi Satva, Jean Goubald Kalala, Innoss'B, DJ Spilulu, Voldie Mapenzi, Pson, Mjoe Zuka, Sando Marteau, Wanny S-King, Z-Chief, and Francesco Ntchikala, among others.
