= Ebba Forsberg =

Swedish pop singer

- Born: Ebba Maria Knigge Forsberg; 31 July 1964 (age 62); Stockholm, Sweden
- Genre: Pop
- Occupation: Singer
- Years active: 1997–present
- Label: Eboth
- Website: ebbaforsberg.com

Ebba Maria Knigge Forsberg (born in Stockholm on 31 July 1964) is a Swedish pop singer. She sings solo and was a member of many musical band projects, most notably in Traste Lindéns Kvintett.

Forsberg's family moved from Sweden to Tortola in the West Indies when she was five years old, although her older sister Kajsa Ribbing returned to Sweden after only a year. The rest of the family stayed until Forsberg was 12, at which point they moved to South Africa for eight years before Forsberg moved back to Sweden.

In 1996, she was signed by Guy Oseary to Maverick Records. Her first album for Maverick, Been There, was the subject of "intense advance buzz." Been There featured lyrics written by Forsberg's older sister, Kajsa Ribbing.

In addition to her own music, she has released two albums dedicated to international artists, with Swedish versions of songs from Bob Dylan (2007) and Leonard Cohen (2009). The translations were by Mikael Wiehe.

She had her acting career in a lead role in the television series Anderssons älskarinna.

Ebba Forsberg is the daughter of Lars Lennart Forsberg. She is married to Thomas Knigge with whom she has a child and two step-children. She also has a daughter (b. 1989) from an earlier marriage. She and her husband run the Eboth record label.

== Discography ==
=== Albums ===
Year	Album	Peak Position	Certifications	Notes
Year	Album	SWE	Certifications	Notes
1997	Been There	–		
2001	True Love	–		
2006	Ebba Forsberg	26		
2007	Dylan på svenska Mikael Wiehe and Ebba Forsberg	22		Translated into Swedish by Mikael Wiehe
2009	Ta min vals – Ebba Forsberg sjunger Leonard Cohen	10		Translated into Swedish by Mikael Wiehe
2011	Falling Folding Flipping Feeling	18		
2015	Om jag lämnar dig	12		
