= RJ Kanierra =

Congolese musician (born 1984)

- Also known as: Le Dragon
- Born: Joé Ngoie Mwema; August 9, 1984 (age 42); Kolwezi, Katanga, Zaire (now Lualaba, Democratic Republic of the Congo)
- Genres: Rotatam style; hip-hop; ndombolo
- Occupations: Singer-songwriter; rapper; dancer
- Instruments: Guitar, drums
- Years active: 1998–present
- Labels: Shutuka Musique; SMEA

Joé Ngoie Mwema (born 9 August 1984), known professionally as RJ Kanierra, is a Congolese singer-songwriter, rapper, and dancer. He is regarded as one of the most significant figures in 21st-century Katangese music. His music is a blend of Congolese rhythm and harmony with rap, a synthesis he calls "Rotatam style".

Born and raised in Kolwezi, Ngoie began his recording career in the late 1990s and later released his debut studio album, Les treize lois de la jungle, in 2006. Ngoie's single "Aina Lawa", premiered in 2008, gained significant acclaim in Katanga. In March 2011, he issued his second studio album, 99. Ngoie went on to publish his third studio album, titled 622, in 2013, followed by -243 (2016) and 99×9 (2019). In August 2022, Ngoie unveiled his sixth studio album, 13.

Ngoie gained recognition following the release of his 2023 hit single "Tia", which inspired the "Tia dance challenge" that gained traction on social media and was taken up by several public figures.

== Early life and career ==
=== 1984–2021: Early life, music debut, and releases ===
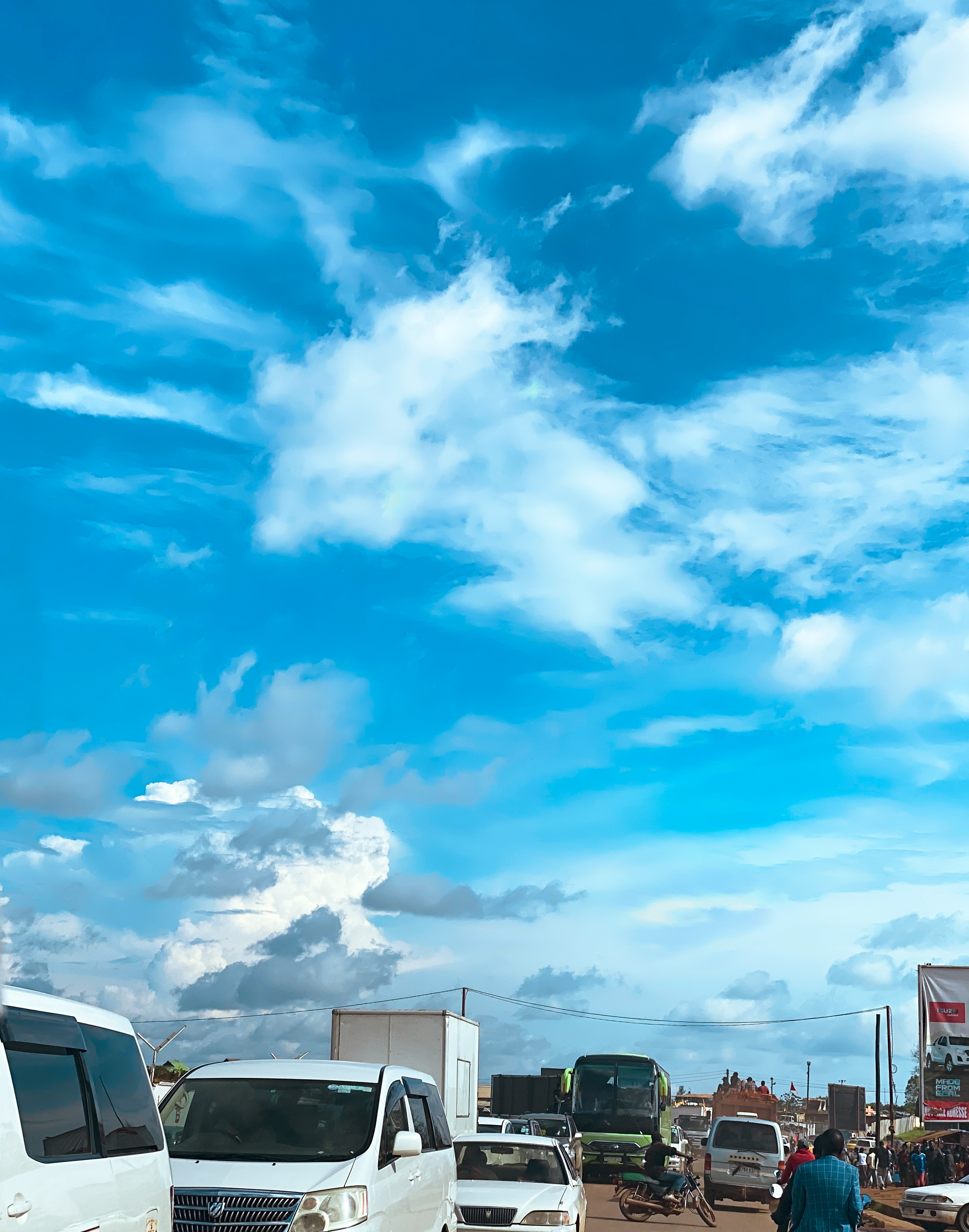
Kolwezi, the city where Ngoie grew up, lies in the Lualaba Province.

Joé Ngoie Mwema was born on 9 August 1984, in Kolwezi, then part of the Katanga province in Zaire (now Lualaba, Democratic Republic of the Congo). As a teenager, he participated in football, karate, and athletics, and became a junior champion in the 100-meter event organized by the Kolwezi Athletics League. In the late 1990s, Ngoie began performing street music in Kolwezi and released "Chère Maman" to seek his mother's permission to pursue music. In 1998, he formed his backing band, Casse-Tête, and later released the demo C'est-à-dire, featuring tracks including "Je Confirme", "Tinss", and "Coliba". He continued performing in Kolwezi while also traveling for productions.

In 2006, Casse-Tête won Best Group at the Nzenze Ngoma Ya Kwetu festival in Lubumbashi. Later that year, Ngoie released his debut studio album, Les treize lois de la jungle, which incorporated hip-hop and R&B. In 2008, he released the single "Aina Lawa", whose lyrics address success, triumph, superstition, and fetishism. In March 2011, he released his second studio album, 99, which included the singles "Salem" and "Bikelele". In 2013, he released his third studio album, 622, a six-track album.

In 2014, Ngoie appeared on Mjoe Zuka's album Rien que l'amour. In 2016, he released his fourth studio album, -243, which included the songs "Winner", "Djaso", and "Je Suis Béni". The album was produced in Zambia and the Democratic Republic of the Congo, and Ngoie held his first major concert at Lupopo Stadium that year. He also performed in Kenya alongside JB Mpiana and Davido. In 2019, he released his fifth studio album, 99×9, featuring the singles "Bae Bae" and "Danza". On 25 March 2019, he released "Get Down", featuring Mink's, followed by "Bina Vuya", featuring Kisangani-born rapper Alesh.

On 10 October 2020, Ngoie released the single "Vula Vwala", also known as "Longola Lata", which reached number one on the Lubumbashi music charts. He received the Honorary Prize at the Tshota Awards in Likasi and was nominated for Song of the Year at the City Awards. On 6 February 2021, he introduced singer Eric Flash through his label, Shutuka Musique, and released the single "Baby Sugar". On 25 June 2021, Ngoie collaborated with Christian Bella on "Don't Judge", recorded in Tanzania.

=== 2022–present: 13 and "Tia" ===
Ngoie's sixth studio album, 13, was released on 13 August 2022 and includes 13 tracks featuring guest appearances by Eric Flash, Gally Garvey, Anita Mwarabu, Yo Maps, Ramythologie, Madame Cooper, and Ntosh Gazi. Ngoie subsequently announced the "13 Tour Dragon", which began on 2 April and ended on 16 July 2023 at the Afrodisiac Festival in Brussels. The tour included performances in the Democratic Republic of the Congo, Namibia, France, and Belgium.

On 22 September 2023, Ngoie released the single "Tia", with the music video directed by Petit Fils and produced by Shutuka Musique. The song follows a worker who, after going unpaid for several months, takes on debt while awaiting payment from the state. It surpassed two million YouTube views within two weeks and reached the top five on Shazam's global music chart, while also topping charts in Cameroon and Ivory Coast. The song also reached number four on Boomplay's Top Cameroon Songs chart and inspired the "Tia dance challenge" on TikTok, which was taken up by public figures including boxer Martin Bakole and comedian Herman Amisi. Mbote.cd named "Tia" its "Song of the Year".

On 24 November 2023, Ngoie announced that he had signed a record deal with Sony Music Entertainment Africa (SMEA), whose French-speaking division is based in Ivory Coast, under the supervision of the famed Congolese patron Elvis Adidiema. The next day, he joined Fally Ipupa on stage at his concert at Paris La Défense Arena. Ngoie later appeared at the Sana Weekend of the Foyer Culturel de Goma on 20 July 2024. On 9 August, he released the Swahili- and Lingala-language single "Lela", produced by ML Beatz through Shutuka Musique and accompanied by a music video co-directed by Mr Tcheck, also known as Sky Star, and Derek Simba. On 12 December, Ngoie collaborated with Ugandan singer Eddy Kenzo on the remix of "Moya", a track from his album 13. On 6 June 2025, he followed with "Posa", a Lingala-language single that Talents2Kin said explored different musical directions while retaining aspects of his Rotatam sound. Radio France Internationale described "Posa" as a fusion of Afropop, electro, and Congolese rumba. On 23 January 2026, he released the single "Champagne".

== Discography ==
=== Albums ===
Year	Title	Details
2006	Les treize lois de la jungle	—
2011	99	—
2013	622	—
2016	-243	—
2019	99×9	—
2022	13	Released: 13 August 2022; Label: Shutuka Musique

== Awards and nominations ==
Year	Event	Prize	Recipient	Result	Ref.
2021	Tshota Awards	Honorary Prize	Himself	Won	
2021	City Awards	Song of the Year	Ongoing research	Nominated	
2023	Zikomo Africa Awards	Popular song of the Year	"Tia"	Won	
2023	Zikomo Africa Awards	Best Male Artist	Himself	Nominated	
2023	Prix Lokumu	Best Male Urban Artist	Himself	Nominated	
2024	PRIMUD	Best Artist of Central Africa	Himself	Won	
2024	Cameroon International Music Festival Awards	Best African Artist	Himself	Won	
2024	Mundi Music Awards	Song of the Year	"Tia"	Won	
2024	Mundi Music Awards	Best Male Artist	Himself	Nominated	
2024	Mundi Music Awards	Best Song	"Tia"	Won	
2024	Mundi Music Awards	Best Phenomenal Artist	Himself	Won	
2024	Mundi Music Awards	Best Choreographer Artist	Himself	Nominated	
