= Björn Afzelius =

Swedish musician (1947–1999)

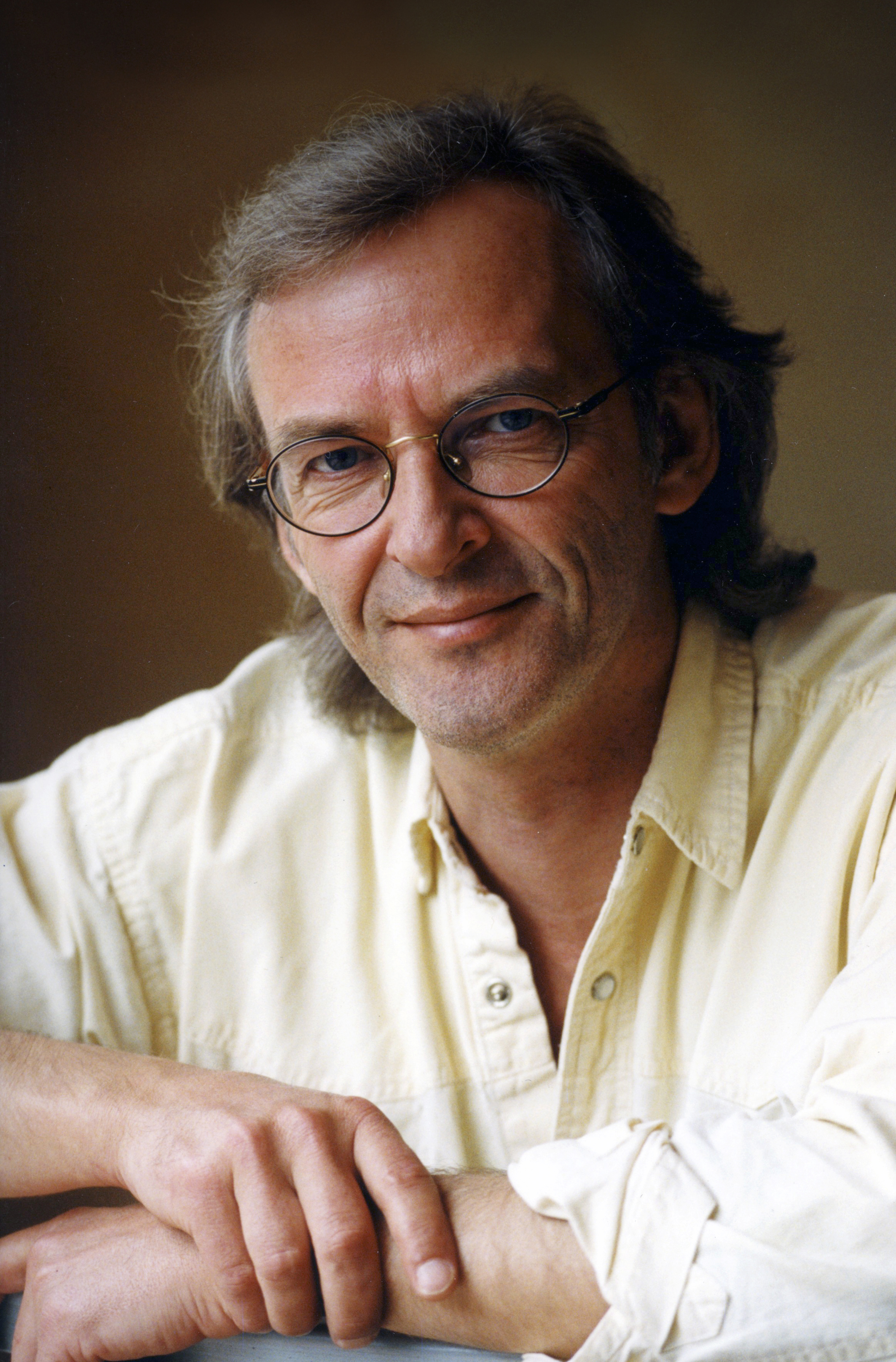
- Björn Afzelius, May 1994

Background information
- Born: 27 January 1947; Huskvarna, Jönköping County, Sweden
- Died: 16 February 1999 (aged 52) Gothenburg, Sweden
- Genres: Rock, pop, progg
- Occupation: singer-songwriter
- Years active: 1970–1999
- Labels: Rebelle Records, MNW, Nackswing, Amalthea, Norske Gram, Transmission, Not On Label, CMC Entertainment, PolyGram, Plateselskapet, Diesel Music, Premium Publishing
- Past members: Hoola Bandoola Band
- Website: bjornafzelius.com

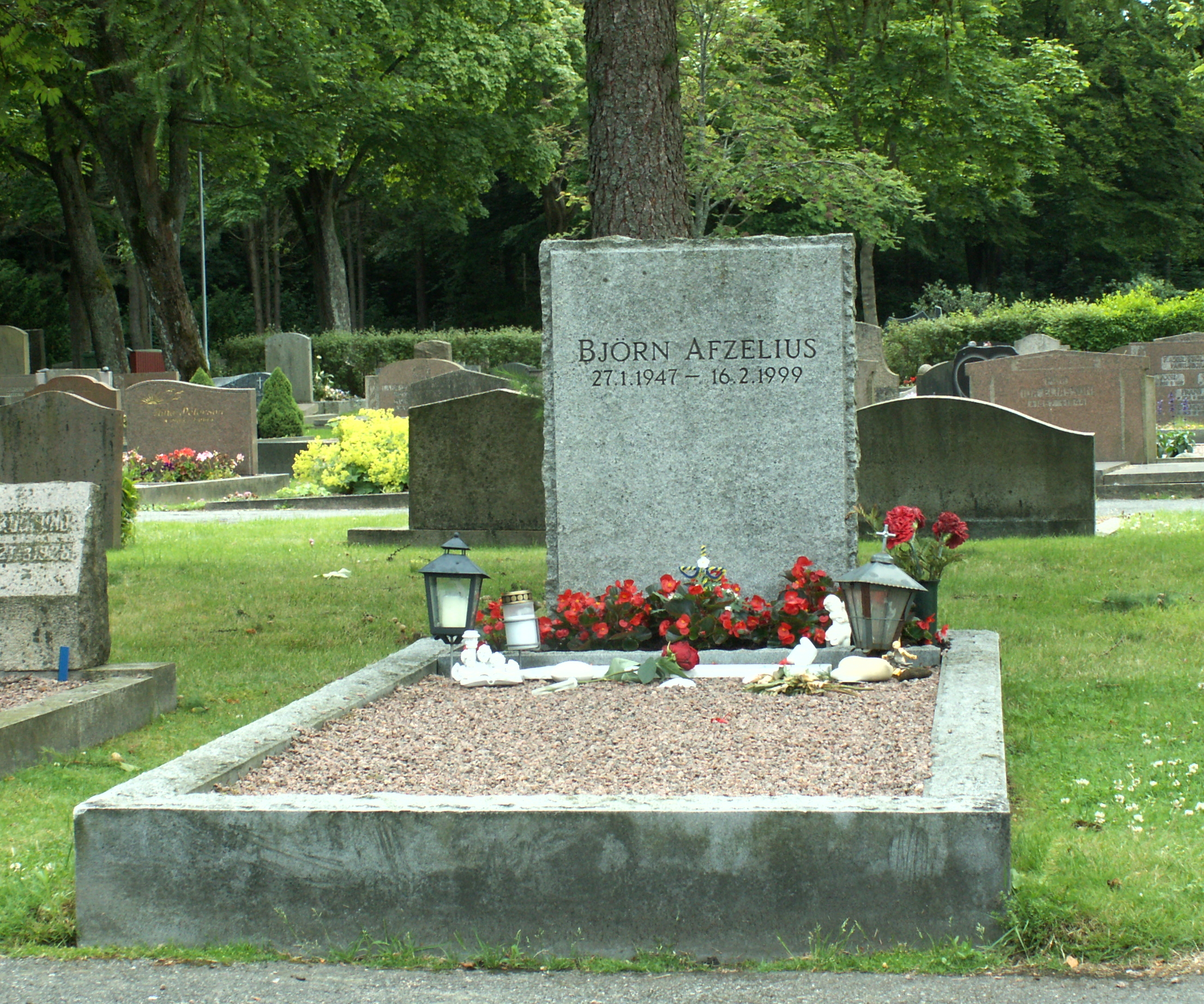
Björn Afzelius grave at Västra kyrkogården in Gothenburg.

Björn Svante Afzelius (27 January 1947 – 16 February 1999) was a Swedish singer-songwriter and guitar player. He was an outspoken socialist, known for his support for Olof Palme. His songs are about love, politics and joys and sadness in life.

== Career ==
Björn Svante Afzelius was born on 27 January 1947 in Huskvarna, Jönköping County. His father Svante Arnold Afzelius (1923–1976) was an engineer and his mother Ulla Afzelius (1926–1971) was a housewife. His only sibling is his brother Bengt (b. 1952) who is a music teacher. He came into contact with music from a very young age, because his mother and her side of the family were largely into music. In 1970, Afzelius formed the progg group Hoola Bandoola Band together with Mikael Wiehe. Wiehe and Afzelius became very close friends and worked together long after Hoola Bandoola had dissolved in 1975.

Afzelius released his first solo album in 1974, his last one in 1999. Some of his most popular songs are "Ikaros", "Tusen bitar" (Thousand pieces – which was originally recorded by Danish Anne Linnet as "Tusind Stykker"), "Sång till friheten" (Song for Freedom – which was originally recorded by Cuban Silvio Rodríguez as "El Día Feliz Que Está Llegando"), "Kungens man" (The king's man), "Tankar i Havanna" (Thoughts in Havanna) and "Till min kära" (For my dear). He died from lung cancer in 1999, 52 years old, but he remains one of the most beloved artists in Scandinavia.

He wrote about 150 songs and sold over two-and-a-half million albums.

== Death and legacy ==
Afzelius died on 16 February 1999 in Gothenburg.

The Björn Afzelius International Culture Foundation (BAIK) was set up in his honour. The foundation has in the past sponsored a prize known as the Freemuse Award, which recognises an individual or organisation that "has worked for freedom of musical expression in a remarkable way". The award is given by Freemuse. Winners of the Freemuse Award include:

- 2008: Tiken Jah Fakoly, Ivorian reggae singer exiled from Côte d'Ivoire owing to his outspokenness about political corruption
- 2009: Pete Seeger, American folk singer and activist
- 2010: Joint winners, Iranian singer Mahsa Vahdat and Turkish-Kurdish singer and activist Ferhat Tunç
- 2011: Ramy Essam, who provided the soundtrack for the Arab Spring at Tahrir Square, Cairo, Egypt
- 2013: Festival au Désert, founded and directed by Manny Ansar
- 2016: Lavon Volski, Belarusian rock musician
- 2017: Zohra, the first and only Afghan women’s orchestra

In 2021, the Freemuse Freedom of Artistic Expression Award was opened for nominations.

== Discography ==
=== With Hoola Bandoola Band ===
- 1971: Garanterat individuell
- 1972: Vem kan man lita på?
- 1973: 'På väg
- 1975: Fri Information
- 1975: "Stoppa matchen" (single)

=== Solo albums ===
- 1974: Vem är det som är rädd?
- 1976: För kung och fosterland
- 1978: Johnny Boy (with Björn Afzelius Band)
- 1979: Bakom kulisserna (with Björn Afzelius Band)
- 1979: Another Tale to Tell (with Björn Afzelius Band)
- 1980: Globetrotter (with Globetrotters)
- 1982: Innan tystnaden (with Globetrotters)
- 1982: Danska nätter (live) (with Globetrotters)
- 1984: Exil (with Globetrotters)
- 1984: Afzelius; sång & gitarr (live)
- 1985: Nio liv (with Globetrotters)
- 1986: Grande Finale (live) (with Globetrotters)
- 1986: Björn Afzelius & Mikael Wiehe (with Mikael Wiehe)
- 1987: Riddarna kring runda bordet
- 1988: Don Quixote
- 1988: En man, en röst, en gitarr
- 1990: Tusen bitar
- 1991: Nidaros (live)
- 1992: Afzelius, Bygren och Råstam (live)
- 1994: Nära dig
- 1997: Tankar vid 50
- 1999: Elsinore
- 2004: Björn Afzelius & Mikael Wiehe 1993 – Malmöinspelningarna (with Mikael Wiehe)
- 2011: Tusen bitar – Sånger om kärlek & rättvisa

=== Compilations ===
- 1988: Björn Afzelius Bästa Vol I
- 1988: Björn Afzelius Bästa Vol II
- 1995: Björn Afzelius Bästa Vol III
- 1995: Afzelius Box (Bästa Vol 1, 2, 3)
- 1998: Den röda tråden – Definitivt
- 2002: Den röda tråden Vol 1
- 2002: Den röda tråden Vol 2
- 2005: Björn Afzelius Bästa
- 2006: Guldkorn vol.1
