= En gammal man =

Studio album by Mikael Wiehe
- Released: November 28, 2012
- Recorded: August–October 2012
- Studio: Decibel Studios and Durango Recording, Stockholm, Sweden and Studiefrämjandets studio, Malmö, Sweden,
- Genre: blues; country; Cajun; pop; rock; progg
- Length: 48 minutes
- Label: EMI Music Sweden
- Producer: Mikael Wiehe; David Nyström

Mikael Wiehe chronology
Alla dessa minnen (2010)	En gammal man (2012)

En gammal man was released on 28 November 2012 and is a studio album by Mikael Wiehe. In 2013, it was released as an LP.

== Track listing ==
1. Jag vill bara va en gammal man
2. Om du saknar nån
3. Stjärnorna som föll
4. Med mej blir du aldrig av
5. Min bäste vän är död
6. Kärleken tror jag på
7. Hur tänker du då?
8. Huset (P'Potemkin)
9. Se på mej med ljusa ögon
10. Jag vill tacka dej

== Contributors ==
- Mikael Wiehe – vocals, guitar, producer
- David Nyström – piano, synthesizer, producer
- Ola Gustafsson – guitar, banjo, mandolin, pedal steel
- Christer Karlsson – piano, synthesizer
- Dan Malmqvist – clarinet, bass clarinet
- Lars Holm – accordion
- Jerker Odelholm – bass
- Måns Block – drums, percussion

== Charts ==
Chart (2012–2013)	Peak position
Sweden (Sverigetopplistan)	3
