= Mikael Wiehe =

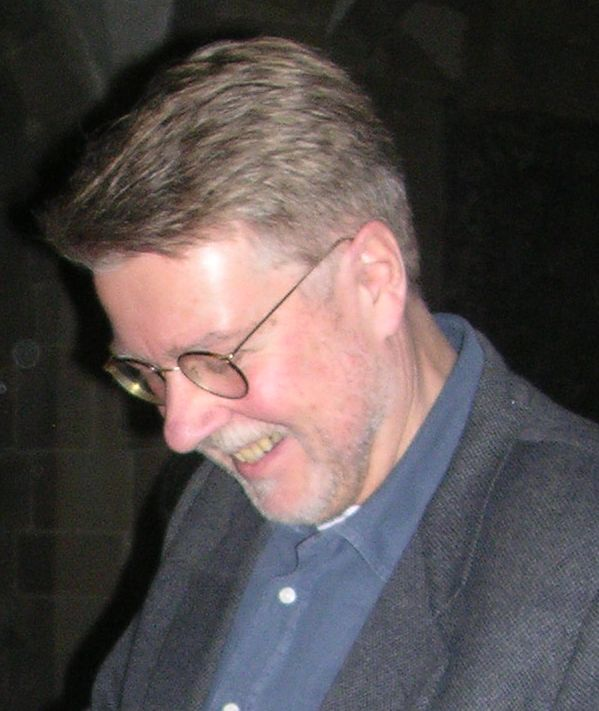
- Mikael Wiehe in 2005.

Background information
- Born: Mikael Christian Wiehe; 10 April 1946 (age 80)
- Genres: Progg, rock, blues
- Occupations: Musician, songwriter, singer
- Instruments: Vocals, guitar, saxophone, banjo, clarinet, flute, harmonica, piano, percussion
- Years active: 1958–2025
- Labels: Amalthea, Silence Records, Mistlur Records, MNW, W Records, Norske Gram, Diesel Music, Forente Artister, Transmission, Premium Publishing
- Member of: Hoola Bandoola Band
- Website: mikaelwiehe.se

Mikael Christian Wiehe (born 10 April 1946) is a Swedish singer, multi-instrumentalist and composer. As the main songwriter and driving force of Hoola Bandoola Band he was also one of the most important people in the progg movement.

== Career ==
Wiehe was born in Stockholm. His father was Danish and he spent the first six years of his life in Copenhagen. His father left the family when Wiehe was five years old, and when he was six his mother moved with the family to Malmö, in the Scania region of southern Sweden, giving Wiehe his noticeable Scanian accent. He is a leftist folk musician, dealing with what he considers right and wrong in the society from the eyes of the proletariat, but he also writes personal, non-political songs.

Wiehe was one of the lead singers and the leading songwriter of Hoola Bandoola Band in the 1970s. After the band broke up in 1975, he was the leader of various other bands before becoming a solo artist in the early 1980s. He was a close friend of Björn Afzelius, the other lead singer of Hoola Bandoola Band. They sometimes toured around Scandinavia and recorded together in the 1980s and 1990s.

As of 2022, Wiehe performs all around Sweden, using material from his 20-some albums (excluding various compilations). A recently published song book contains the lyrics and melodies to 220 of his songs. In 2000, he released the single Det här är ditt land, a Swedish-language adaptation of the Woody Guthrie song This Land Is Your Land which received substantial play on Swedish radio. Wiehe has also translated many of Bob Dylan's songs into Swedish, some of which were performed by Totta Näslund.

On 13 August 2025, he announced in Sommar in Sveriges Radio that he had been diagnosed with Alzheimer's disease a year and a half earlier.

== 60th birthday tribute ==
On Wiehe's 60th birthday, a tribute show was held in his hometown Malmö. A number of high-profile Swedish artists, including Joakim Thåström, Lars Winnerbäck, Dregen, Lisa Ekdahl, Timbuktu, Stefan Sundström, Idde Shultz and Anna Stadling (of Hovet), Ebba Forsberg, Thomas Wiehe and Peter Clemmendson, performed Wiehe's songs in front of approximately 20,000 people. At the end of the show, Wiehe took the stage and performed a set of his favorite songs. The concert was later broadcast on Sveriges Television with interviews and older footage of Wiehe.

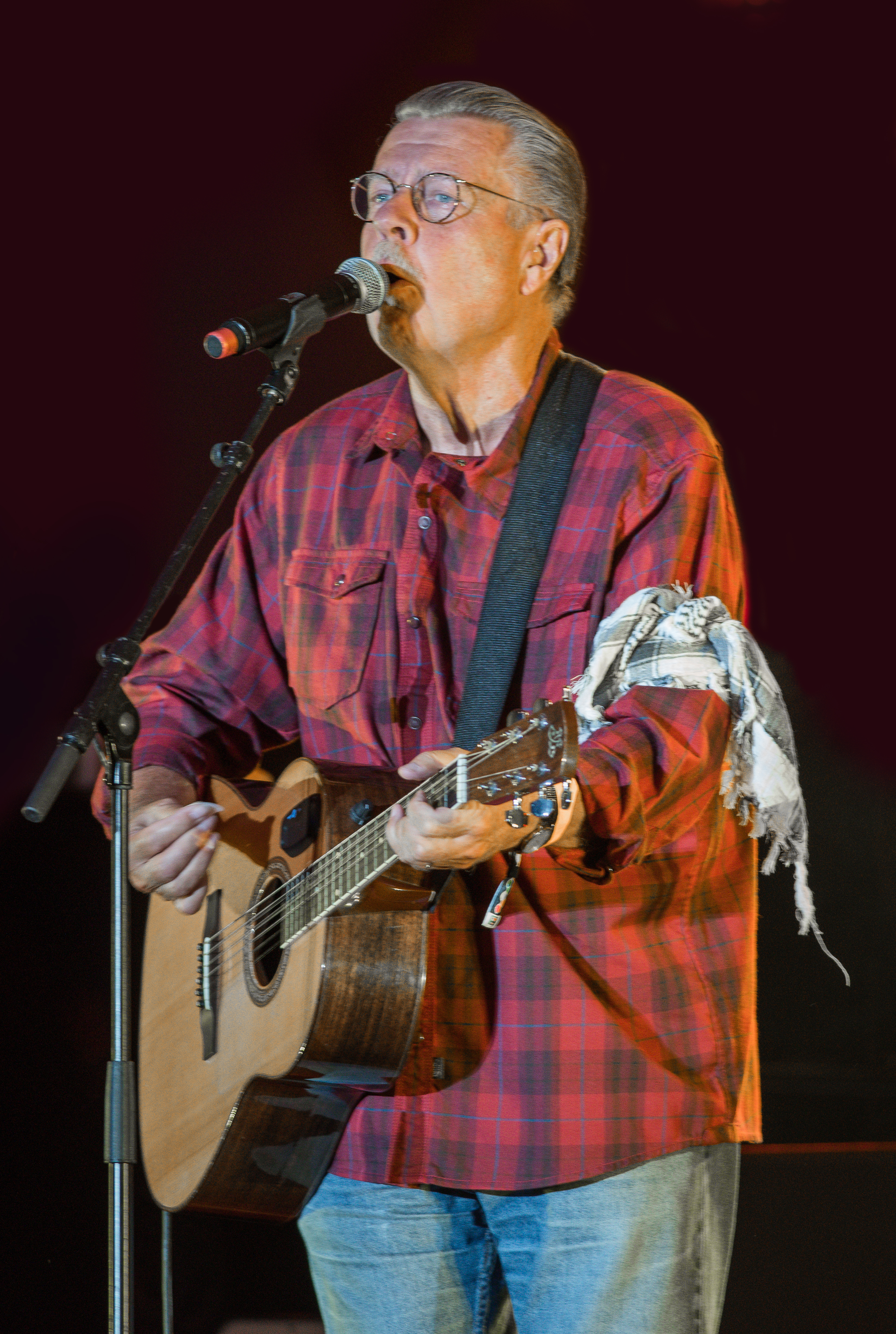
Mikael Wiehe at Stockholm Pride 2014.

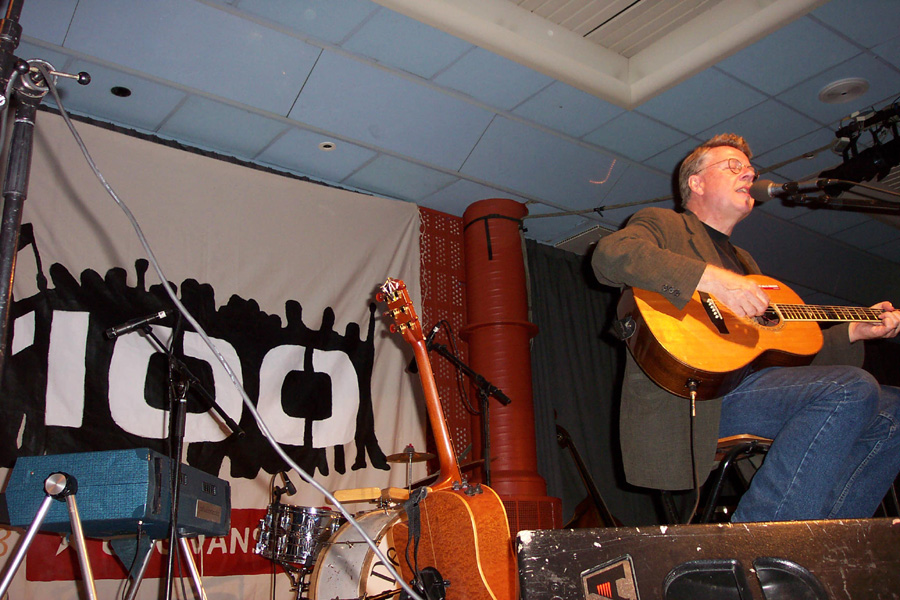
Wiehe performing live at Ung Vänsters congress in 2003.

== Selected discography ==
=== Studio albums ===
Hoola Bandoola Band

- Hoola Bandoola Export (1971)
- Garanterat Individuell (1971)
- Vem Kan Man Lita På? (1972)
- På Väg (1973)
- Stoppa Matchen (1975)
- Fri information (1975)
- Ingenting Förändras Av Sig Själv – 5 cd box (1996)
- För Dom Som Kommer Sen – live (1999)

Mikael Wiehe och Kabaréorkestern

- Sjömansvisor (1978)
- Elden är Lös (1979)

Mikael Wiehe, Nyberg, Franck och Fjellis

- Gökungen (1981)
- Kråksånger (1981)
- Dom Ensligas Alle (1982)

Mikael Wiehe och Co

- Lindansaren (1983)
- Lillian Står i Hagen (1983)
- Mikael Wiehe Mitt i Sverige (1984)
- Hemingwayland (1985)

Solo work

- Mikael Wiehe (1986)
- Basin Street Blues (1988)
- 1989 – live (1989)
- Allt är förändrat (1991)
- Det Ligger Döda Kameler i min Swimmingpool (1992)
- Wiehe 30 sånger – compilation (1993)
- Trollkarlen (1994)
- Sevilla (1998)
- En Sång Till Modet (2000)
- Det Här Är Ditt Land (2000)
- Kommunal 90 År 2000 (2000)
- Kärlek och Politik (2004)
- Moccers (2004)
- Främmande Land (2005)
- Sånger från en inställd skilsmässa (2009)
- En gammal man (2012)
- Isolde (2013)
- Protestsänger (2014)
- En dubbel Dylan på Svenska (2015)

Björn Afzelius och Mikael Wiehe

- Björn Afzelius och Mikael Wiehe (1986)
- Malmöinspelningarna (2004)

Mikael Wiehe och Julio Numhauser

- Suecia – Chile (1989)
- Mikael Wiehe och Julio Numhauser (1991)

Totta och Wiehe

- Dylan (2006)

Mikael Wiehe & Ebba Forsberg

- Dylan På Svenska (2007)

Åge Aleksandersen & Mikael Wiehe

- 14 Akustiska Sånger (2008)

Mikael Wiehe & Jacques Werup

- Wiehe & Werup (2008)

=== Compilation albums ===
- 2012: Alla dessa minnen: Det bästa med Mikael Wiehe
