= Hoola Bandoola Band =

Swedish progg group

- Origin: Malmö, Sweden
- Genres: Progg
- Years active: 1970–1976 (temporary reunions in 1996, 1999 and 2011)
- Members: Mikael Wiehe; Povel Randén; Arne Franck; Per Ove Kellgren; Håkan Skytte; Peter Clemmedson
- Past members: Björn Afzelius
- Website: Official website

The Hoola Bandoola Band was a Swedish progg group from the 1970s whose political views leaned towards the left. Leading members included Mikael Wiehe and Björn Afzelius.

== History ==
Hoola Bandoola Band, along with Nationalteatern, was the biggest band of the Swedish progg movement. Whereas Nationalteatern put socially realistic lyrics to rock melodies, Hoola Bandoola had more politically charged lyrics and diverged further from traditional rock.

The name is most likely inspired by the fictional language spoken by ants in the Donald Duck cartoon "Tea for Two Hundred".

The band was formed in 1970. In 1971 they had their first radio hit and were immediately contacted by two record companies, one commercial and the alternative MNW. In the political climate of the 1970s, the choice of a company was crucial, and by choosing an alternative company, Hoola Bandoola came to be the most well known band on the alternative side in Sweden.

Their debut in 1971, Garanterat individuell (Guaranteed Individual), was hailed as the start of a new era for Swedish pop and was voted album of the year. This first album was not very political, but on the second album Vem kan man lita på? (Whom can one trust?), released the next year, the socialist message was much more pronounced. It included hits such as "Keops pyramid".

With På Väg (On the Way), recorded with a balalaika orchestra, Hoola Bandoola became one of the best-selling groups in Sweden. In 1975 they released a fourth album Fri information (Free Information), where the socialist message was more outspoken than ever before. With this album, Afzelius wrote half of the songs (Wiehe wrote most songs in previous albums).

In 1975, the alternative movement gathered in opposition to a tennis match played between Sweden and Chile, which at the time was under the military dictatorship of Pinochet. For that event, Hoola Bandoola released "Stoppa matchen" (Stop the Match) as a single. This was their last studio recording. In 1976, the band broke up and Wiehe and Afzelius started very successful careers as singer/songwriters, both together and by themselves.

After 20 years' absence, Hoola Bandoola reunited in 1996, playing warmup for Bob Dylan and going on their own nationwide tour playing over 50 shows with a total of over 200,000 people attending the tour. Recordings from this tour were released in 1999 after the death of Björn Afzelius on the album För dom som kommer sen (For Those Who Come Later). Each year on the anniversary of Afzelius' death, an award is given out to a person who has "done work in the spirit of Björn Afzelius".

In August 2011 the band played at the Malmö festival, promoting their new double CD.

== Discography ==
- 1971: Hoola Bandolla Export
- 1971: Garanterat individuell
- 1972: Vem kan man lita på?
- 1973: På väg
- 1975: Stoppa matchen
- 1975: Fri information
- 1996: Country Pleasures

Collections

- 1996: Ingenting förändras av sig själv - 5 cd box
- 1987: Hoola Bandoola Band 1971 - 1976
- 2011: Hoola Bandoola Band 1971 - 2011

Live

- 1999: ...För dom som kommer sen - live
