= Fri Information =

Fri information

Studio album by Hoola Bandoola Band
- Released: October 1975
- Recorded: August 1975
- Genre: Progg
- Length: 41:47
- Label: MNW

Fri information is the fifth and final studio album by the Swedish progg and rock band Hoola Bandoola Band. It was recorded in August 1975 and released in October of the same year on the record label MNW. The album is the band's first with Björn Afzelius as a songwriter. Mikael Wiehe had previously written all of the songs, except for "Dansmelodi", which was written by Thomas Wiehe. The album was the band's last before their breakup in 1976.

The album sold 43,000 copies, and its artwork was made by Tore Berger.

== Track listing ==
Side one

1. "Tillbaka (Stures sång)" (Mikael Wiehe) – 4:50
2. "Älska mej, Bill" (Wiehe) – 4:15
3. "Birmingham" (Björn Afzelius) – 4:03
4. "LTO-tango" (Afzelius) – 2:55
5. "Victor Jara" (Wiehe) – 4:30

Side two

1. "Kvinnoförakt" (Afzelius) – 5:08
2. "Huddinge, Huddinge" (Wiehe) – 4:20
3. "Juanita" (Afzelius) – 4:53
4. "Hur länge skall vi vänta" (Wiehe) – 6:53

== Charts ==
Chart (1975)	Peak position
Sweden (Sverigetopplistan)	12

== Personnel ==
- Björn Afzelius – guitar, vocals
- Mikael Wiehe – guitar, saxophone, flute, vocals
- Peter Clemmedson – guitar, banjo
- Arne Franck – bass
- Povel Randén – piano, guitar, accordion, vocals
- Per-Ove Kellgren – drums
- Håkan Skytte – percussion
