= Rebelle Records =

Rebelle Records AB is a record label founded by Björn Afzelius in 1988. The name is a convergence of his two daughters' names Rebecca and Isabelle. The company, which holds the rights to all of Afzelius music is now located in Snekkersten, Denmark.

== See also ==
- List of record labels
