= Foyer Culturel de Goma =

Cultural center and art school in Goma, North Kivu

- Location: Goma, North Kivu, Democratic Republic of the Congo
- Type: Cultural center

Construction
- Opened: 2011; 15 years ago

Website
- https://foyercultureldegoma.org/

The Foyer Culturel de Goma (meaning "Goma Cultural Center"), colloquially referred to by its acronym FCG, is a cultural center and art school in Goma, North Kivu, in the eastern part of the Democratic Republic of the Congo. It is a regional key institution for promoting arts as a driving force for peace, reconciliation, and social change in the African Great Lakes region.

The center provides artistic education to nearly 600 young people and adults annually, offering courses in various disciplines such as vocal performance, piano, guitar, percussion, spoken word, dance, and cinema. FCG also plays an integral role in the community's cultural development by partnering with local families and schools. As the birthplace of the Amani Festival, the most significant cultural event in the region, the Foyer Culturel de Goma has established itself as a cultural reference in the city.

== Organization ==
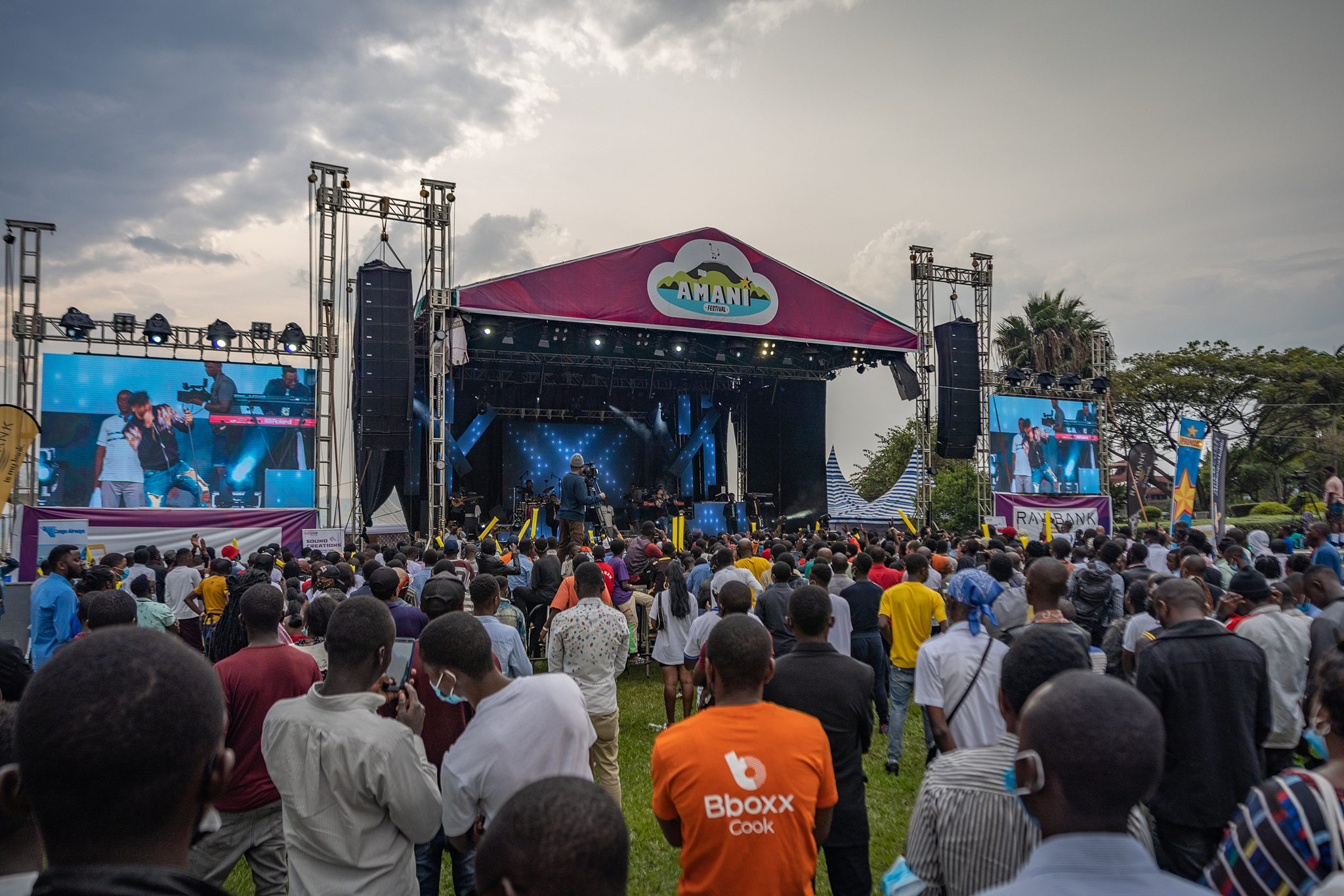
Foyer Culturel de Goma is noted as the birthplace of Goma's annual Amani Festival.

Foyer Culturel de Goma's organizational structure is centered on an executive management team responsible for overseeing all activities. This team comprises a director, a head of administration and finance, a head of external relations and events, an educational and artistic coordinator, a communications officer, and a logistician. The center also employs a teaching staff of 10 instructors who provide training in various artistic disciplines. A support team, comprising seven musicians and one technician, assists in the production of performances.

=== Courses ===
==== Guitar ====
The guitar course is divided into two pedagogical tiers. In Level 1, students learn basic guitar concepts, focusing on simple chords like G, C, E, D, A, and R, alongside basic three-beat and two-beat rhythms. Level 2 introduces students to barre chords, scales, and arpeggios, which allows them to work on songs and more advanced techniques.

==== Spoken Word ====
The spoken word course emphasizes the art of speech, teaching students the skill of public speaking. It covers two main areas: Poetry, where learners explore rhythm, rhyme, meter, and prosody; and Dramatic Art, which includes theatrical activities and the performance of dramas and comedies. This course fosters students' ability to use language artistically in public life.

==== Piano ====
The piano course introduces students to the instrument's various components, such as the keyboard and keys. The curriculum includes exercises for finger movements, mastering scales, modes, harmony, rhythmic improvisation, and an introduction to reading musical notes in both treble and bass clefs. The course is divided into beginner and advanced levels, with a focus on allowing students to progress toward composing their own music.

==== Dance ====
The dance program encompasses traditional African dance, contemporary styles, Afro-dance, and Congolese ndombolo. Students are categorized into beginner, advanced, and professional levels. The course emphasizes regional traditional dances, particularly from North Kivu's twelve ethnic groups, as well as modern and creative dance forms.

==== Vocal performance ====
The vocal performance course is structured into two groups. Beginners are introduced to their voice as an instrument and learn basic vocal techniques. Advanced students dive deeper into vocal techniques, stage performance, and music theory. To further enhance learning, a choir is created where students work on a variety of gospel and popular music repertoires, which allows them to assess their progress.

==== Percussion ====
The percussion course familiarizes students with various percussion instruments, including the djembe, drums, marimba, balafon, likembe, and maracas. Structured across beginner, advanced, and professional levels, advanced participants have the opportunity to join the professional ensemble, Tambour du Kivu, which performs at regional cultural events.

==== Cinema ====
The cinema program equips students with theoretical and practical filmmaking skills, and is divided into three specializations:

1. Acting: Focuses on helping students harness their voice, gaze, and body language in front of the camera.
2. Directing and screenwriting: Teaches students the fundamentals of fiction and documentary filmmaking, from writing screenplays to technical breakdowns and directing.
3. Technical aspects (image, editing, sound): Trains students to use cameras, editing software, and sound equipment effectively.

=== Kivu Fanfare ===
The FCG collaborates with the Amani Festival and the French group Mortal Combo to maintain a professional civilian fanfare, Kivu Fanfare. Members of Mortal Combo lead workshops to support the skills of local musicians, including saxophonists and trumpeters. The fanfare performs a repertoire of popular and original compositions at regional events.

=== Educational and artistic exchanges ===
The center also engages in educational exchanges, nationally and internationally. Domestically, it collaborates with the National Institute of Arts (INA) in Kinshasa. Internationally, it partners with several conservatories in Belgium, including those in Verviers, Liège, and Brussels. These exchanges allow trainers to acquire advanced knowledge through annual three-month training programs in Belgium, which then culminate in public performances. FCG also receives support and financing from organizations such as Wallonie-Bruxelles International (WBI), En Avant Les Enfants (EALE), and MusicFund.

== History ==
The Foyer Culturel de Goma was established in 2011 by the Belgian association En Avant Les Enfants (EALE), which is an organization that promotes sustainable development initiatives for vulnerable mothers and children in Goma. In 2013, FCG became the birthplace of the Amani Festival, which was conceived by the center's trainers and management, who sought to use art as a means to promote peace, cultural appreciation, and social harmony within the conflict-affected African Great Lakes region. Over time, FCG gained prominence as North Kivu's key cultural hub and played a key role in supporting the development of young local artists as well as contributing to the production and industrialization of art and culture in the region. On 11 March 2020, the center signed a donation contract with the Japanese government in Kinshasa.
