= Esperanzah! =

Belgian annual world music festival

Esperanzah! is a world music festival which has been offering a varied programme of well-known and less familiar artists since 2002. Over the course of three to four days, it presents a diverse lineup of eclectic artists at the Abbey of Floreffe. The event’s name was inspired by Manu Chao’s album "Proxima Estacion", released in June 2001. The festival organizers focus on up-and-coming artists.

Previously, (3 editions from 1976 and 1979), another festival called "Le Temps des Cerises" was organized within the walls of abbey.

It takes place at Floreffe Abbey, between Charleroi and Namur in Belgium. The festival organisation is currently supported by the cooperative Zah! and ASBL Z!, which also organized the Verdur Rock (in 2015 and 2016) as well as Jyva'Zik.

== Characteristics ==
Two stages are built to be used by more than 20 groups. The stage "côté jardin" showcases artists of various origins who remain true to their roots or offer musical projects that combine instruments, rhythms and melodies from different traditions. As for the "côté cour" stage, it is more urban and offers a mix of genres between traditional rhythms and more modern music. Artists hosted include: Tryo, Manu Chao, Patti Smith, La Ruda Salska, Les Ogres de Barback, La Rue Ketanou, La Kinky Beat, Les Hurlements d'Leo, La Phaze, N&SK, Dub Incorporation, Balkan Beat Box, Marcel et son Orchestre, Saule, Hocus Pocus, Fauve, and others.

The festival also offers film screenings, artistic creations, conferences, activities for children, craftsmen and restaurants from around the world, street artists, a fair trade cocktail bar, Esperanzah! radio 24 hours a day and two campsites. The public is also educated on the importance of sorting waste.

== History ==
During its first edition in 2002, the festival welcomed about 10,000 visitors. The number of participants in the 2008 edition was approximately 27,000. In 2013, there were almost 36,000 spectators, and nearly 46,000 in 2014.

== Radio Esperanzah! ==
Since the 2004 edition, Radio Esperanzah, a temporary radio station launched by people involved in free radio in French-speaking Belgium, has been covering the festival, thus enabling listeners online to experience the festival.
