= Tiken Jah Fakoly =

Ivorian reggae singer (born 1968)

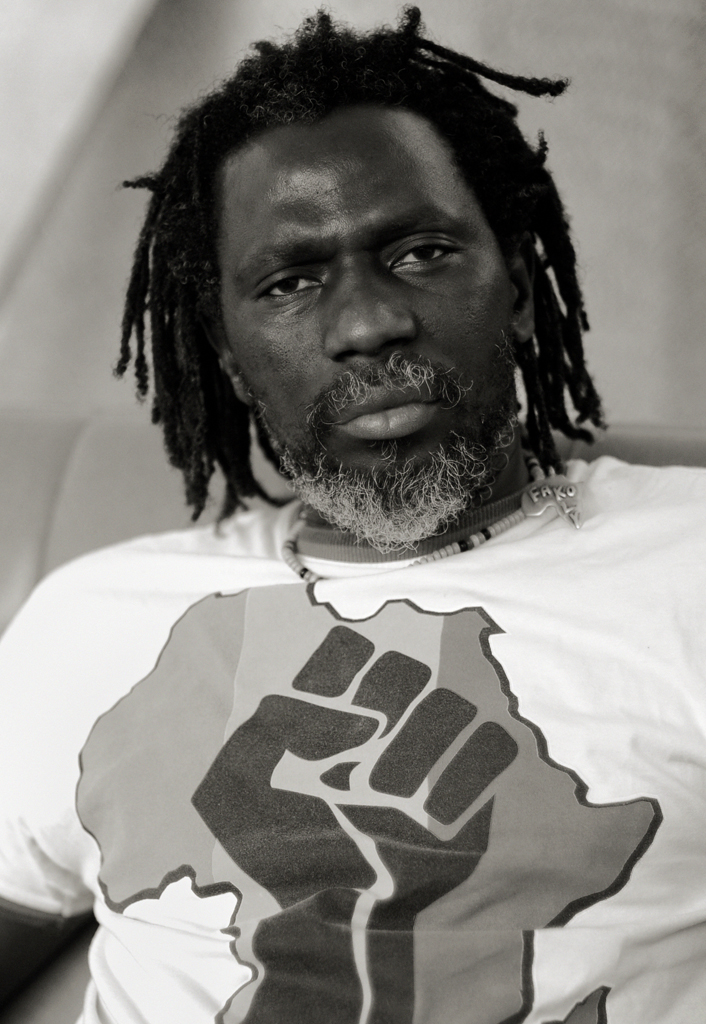

Background information
- Born: Doumbia Moussa Fakoly; 23 June 1968 (age 58); Odienné, Kabadougou, Ivory Coast
- Genres: Reggae
- Occupations: singer, songwriter
- Years active: 1987–present

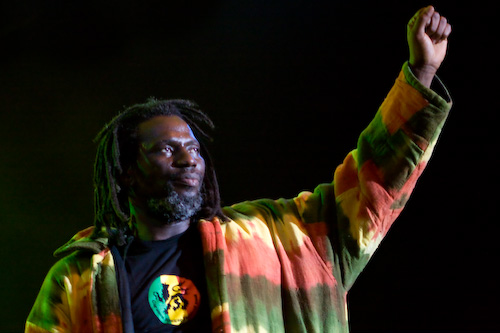
Tiken Jah Fakoly at Africajarc Festival, in Cajarc, 46, on 26 July 2008.

Doumbia Moussa Fakoly (born June 23, 1968 in Odienné), better known by his stage name Tiken Jah Fakoly (/ˈtɪkən ˈdʒɑː fækəˈli/), is an Ivorian reggae singer and songwriter.

== Early life ==
Doumbia Moussa Fakoly was born on 23 June 1968 in Odienné, Kabadougou Region, north-western Côte d'Ivoire. He discovered reggae at an early age, assembling his first group, Djelys, in 1987. He became well-known at a regional level, but later ascended to national recognition.

== Career ==
Concerned by the social and political evolution of his country, it was not long before Tiken Jah was writing incisive works on the political environment in Côte d'Ivoire. One such work was on the death of Félix Houphouët-Boigny in 1993, which resulted in a surge of popularity amongst the nation's youth. In 1998, Fakoly made his first international appearance in Paris.

Tiken Jah Fakoly plays music "to wake up the consciences". His music speaks about the many injustices done to the people of his country and Africans in general, as well as inciting calls for pan-Africanism and an African economic, political and cultural resurgence. As such, many African listeners feel a deep affinity with his lyrics as Fakoly speaks for oppressed people. This connection has helped make Tiken Jah Fakoly a much-listened artist throughout the world.

Since the rise in political instability and xenophobia in Côte d'Ivoire and after receiving death threats due to his lyrics, Fakoly has lived in exile in Bamako, Mali since 2003. In December 2007, Fakoly was declared persona non grata in Senegal after criticizing President Abdoulaye Wade.

In 2009 Tiken Jah launched a campaign entitled "Un concert une école", or One Concert, One School. Through the campaign, and in collaboration with institutions and associations, he was able to finance the construction of a school in the village of Touroni, and a college in Dianké, Mali. He held concerts in Burkina Faso, Côte d'Ivoire and Guinea, accompanied by a vast communication campaign promoting education.

Tiken Jah Fakoly has recorded various tracks with other artists. He is featured on Steel Pulse: African Holocaust, on Didier Awadi: Stoppez les criminels, on Riké: Airt Frais, on Bernard Lavilliers: Carnets De Bord, on Amadou & Mariam: Dimanche À Bamako, on Dub Incorporation Diversité, and on Tata Pound: Cikan. He also appears on the compilation African Consciences with Mebgane N’Dour. He features in the movie Les Oiseaux Du Ciel, directed by Eliane de Latour. 2009 "Africa's Reggae Legend in the Making", Directed by Mackie Fagan. Tiken Jah actively participated in the documentary "Sababou" by Samir Benchikh which aims to promote a positive image of Africa and especially Ivory Coast, by demonstrating how people like Tiken have been engaged in ameliorating the living conditions for people in West Africa through peace, democracy, fighting hunger, promoting education, etc. In 2014 he contributed to the track Cocoa Na Chocolate with other African artists, in support of the Do Agric, It Pays campaign by ONE .

== Personal life ==
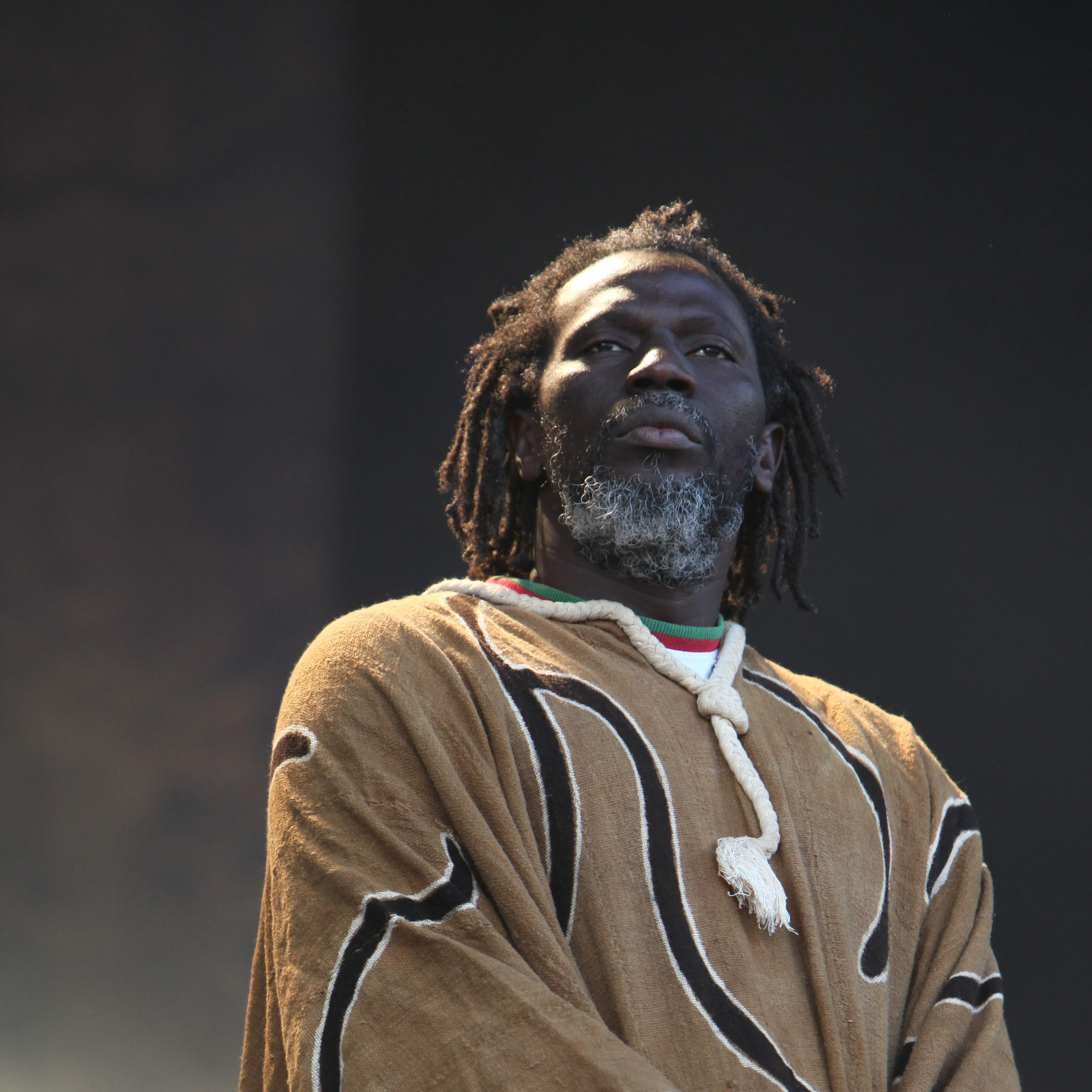

Despite being a reggae singer and having a deep respect for Rastafari culture, Tiken Jah came from a Muslim family and is still a practicing Muslim today. His family was slow to support his reggae career. He occasionally smokes marijuana, but encourages others not to.

== Discography ==
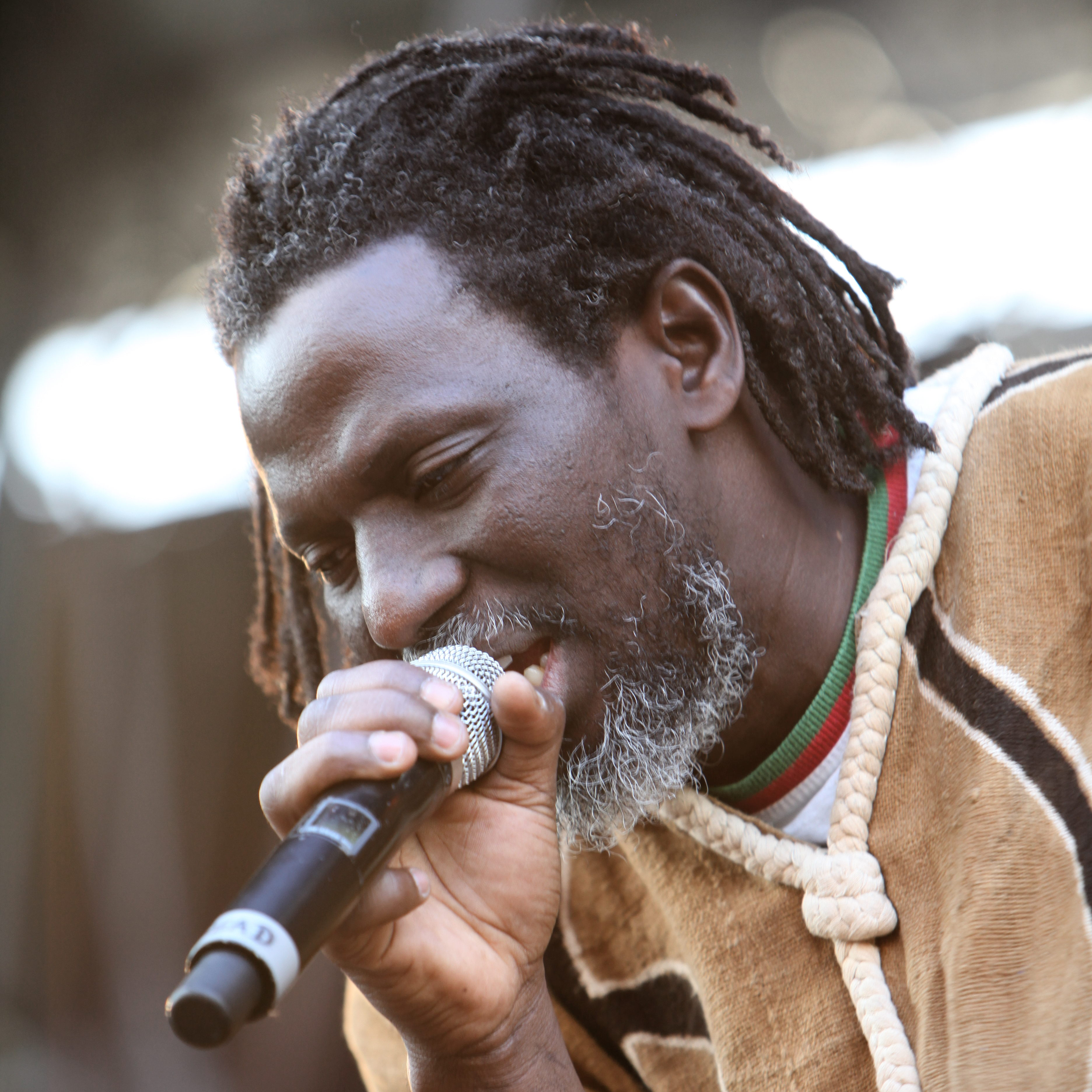

- 1993: Les Djelys (cassette only – discontinued)
- 1994: Missiri (cassette only – discontinued)
- 1996: Mangercratie
- 1999: Cours d'histoire
- 2000: Le Caméléon (exclusive to West Africa)
- 2002: Françafrique (see the article about the term)
- 2004: Coup de gueule
- 2005: Africa wants to be free, compilation to support fr:Survie (association)
- 2007: L'Africain Wrasse Records
- 2008: Live in Paris Wrasse Records
- 2008: Le Caméléon Barclay Records
- 2010: African Revolution
- 2014: Dernier Appel Universal Music
- 2015: Racines
- 2019: Le monde est chaud
- 2022: Braquage de pouvoir
- 2024: Acoustic

NOTE: Mangercratie was released in France in 1999 and in Canada in 2000. Cours d'histoire was released in France in 2000 and in Canada in 2001. The first two albums were only released in Côte d'Ivoire. His first music video is "Plus jamais ça" ("Mangercratie" album), directed by J.G Biggs.

== Awards ==
- 2003: Victoires de la Musique 2003, in the category of Reggae Album/Ragga/World with the album Françafrique
- 2008: Inaugural Freemuse Award, which is given by the Freemuse organisation, sponsored by the Björn Afzelius International Culture Foundation
