= Mani Martin =

Rwandan singer, songwriter, actor and performing artist

- Birth name: Mani Martin
- Born: 24 December 1988 (age 36); Rusizi, Ntura, Rwanda
- Origin: Rwanda
- Genres: Afro-fusion, Pop, Soul, Gospel, Traditional
- Occupation(s): Singer, Songwriter, Composer, Actor
- Instrument(s): Vocals, Guitar, Harmonica
- Years active: 2000-present
- Labels: Independent

Mani Martin is a Rwandan singer, songwriter, actor and performing artist. He has won numerous awards. His unique musical sound that reflects the Afro-fusion, urban and traditional sounds has received National & international attention hence being described by "Rwanda Spectrum Magazine" as one of the best live music performing artists of the Rwandan music scene. Mani sings in Kinyarwanda, Kiswahili, English and French.

== yeye History ==
=== Early years ===
Mani was born on 24 December 1988 in Ntura village in the Western Province of Rwanda. He grew up in a Charity Home.

=== Musical career ===
His talent was discovered at the age of nine, he composed his first song called "Barihe" which means "where are they" as a way to release the endless questions in the mind of Rwanda innocent child three years after the tragic history of the 1994 Genocide against the Tutsi. In 2000, Mani recorded a tape of 12 songs titled "Agapfa kaburiwe ni Impongo" which opened a door for him to tour Rwanda performing in various churches; as well, he released the Swahili version called "Urukumbuzi and Kumbukumbu". In 2010, after high school, Mani he founded his band (Kesho Band) and started performing at different and started performing in small events, weddings and hotel events in order to earn a living outside charity home and to cater for his further education.

== Discography ==
=== Studio albums ===
List of studio albums with selected details
Title	Details
Isaya ya 9	Released: 2008; Label: Mani Martin; Formats: Digital download
Icyo Dupfana	Released: 2010; Label: Mani Martin; Formats: Digital download
Intero y`amahoro	Released:2011; Label: Mani Martin; Formats: Digital download
My Destiny	Released:2012; Label: Big Talent Entertainment; Formats: Digital download
Afro	Released:2017; Label:Mani Martin; Formats: Digital download

== Movie ==
Beyond his musical career, Mani has also explored acting and starred in the film "Long Coat" in 2009 which explored the lives of Rwandans after the Genocide of 1994 and kept collaborating with movie industry by providing music for films and creating sound tracks for different movies.

== Awards and nominations ==
Year	Award	Category	Nominee(s)	Result	Ref.
2004	R.A.P	Song Of The Year	Urukumbuzi	Won	
2006	Pearl Of Africa Music Awards	Best Rwanda Artist	Mani Martin	Nominated	
2006	Radio 10 Awards	Best Artist of the Year	Mani Martin	Won	
2008	Salax Awards	Best Gospel Artist	Mani Martin	Won	
2013	Salax Awards	Best Male Artist	Mani Martin	Nominated	
2013	Salax Awards	Best Traditional Artiste	Mani Martin	Won	
2013	Salax Awards	Best R&B Artist	Mani Martin	Nominated	
2013	Salax Awards	Best Album	My Destiny	Nominated	
2013	Salax Awards	Best Video	My Destiny	Nominated	
2013	Prix decuverte Awards	Best Traditional Artist of the Year	Mani Martin	Nominated	
2019	Fespaco 50 Awards	Most Fashionable Male Celebrity	Mani Martin	Won	

== Concerts ==
Mani has performed both locally and on international festivals such as.

- Sauti Za Busara in Zanzibar
- Amani festival" in DRC
- Bayimba International Festival" 2013 in Uganda
- Jeux de la francophonie in France
- Fespaco festival in Burkina Faso
- Transform Africa in Rwanda
- AU Summit
- World Economic Forum in Kigali
- Kigali Up festival
- Iwacu Music Festival

== Personal life ==
In February 2013, Mani was badly injured in a motorcycle accident. After hospitalization, the artist went on to make a full recovery and went to perform in Souti zabusara festival. Mani started recording songs on different topics other than just gospel songs hence was criticized by the people who wanted him to sing only gospel songs. In 2014, he lost his voice after swallowing a piece of toothpick, that wounded his vocal chords at the level of not being able to sing or speak, after a three months medical follow up he got his voice back and started to work on his Afro album On 7 July 2017, he graduated with a Bachelor in Media and Mass Communication from Mount Kenya University.

== Music style ==
His songs are characterised by message about peace, love and humanity thus being invited to take part in various peace events such as "Mani Martin Japan Peace Tour" organised by UNICEF Japan with NPO T.E.R, UNAMID Peace celebration in Darfur organised by Unamid Darfur Sudan. Mani envisions the world where people live in love, peace and harmony where all lives are treated with respect and dignity. Mani has various collaborations with Eddy Kenzo and Sauti Sol.
