= Yvonne Mwale =

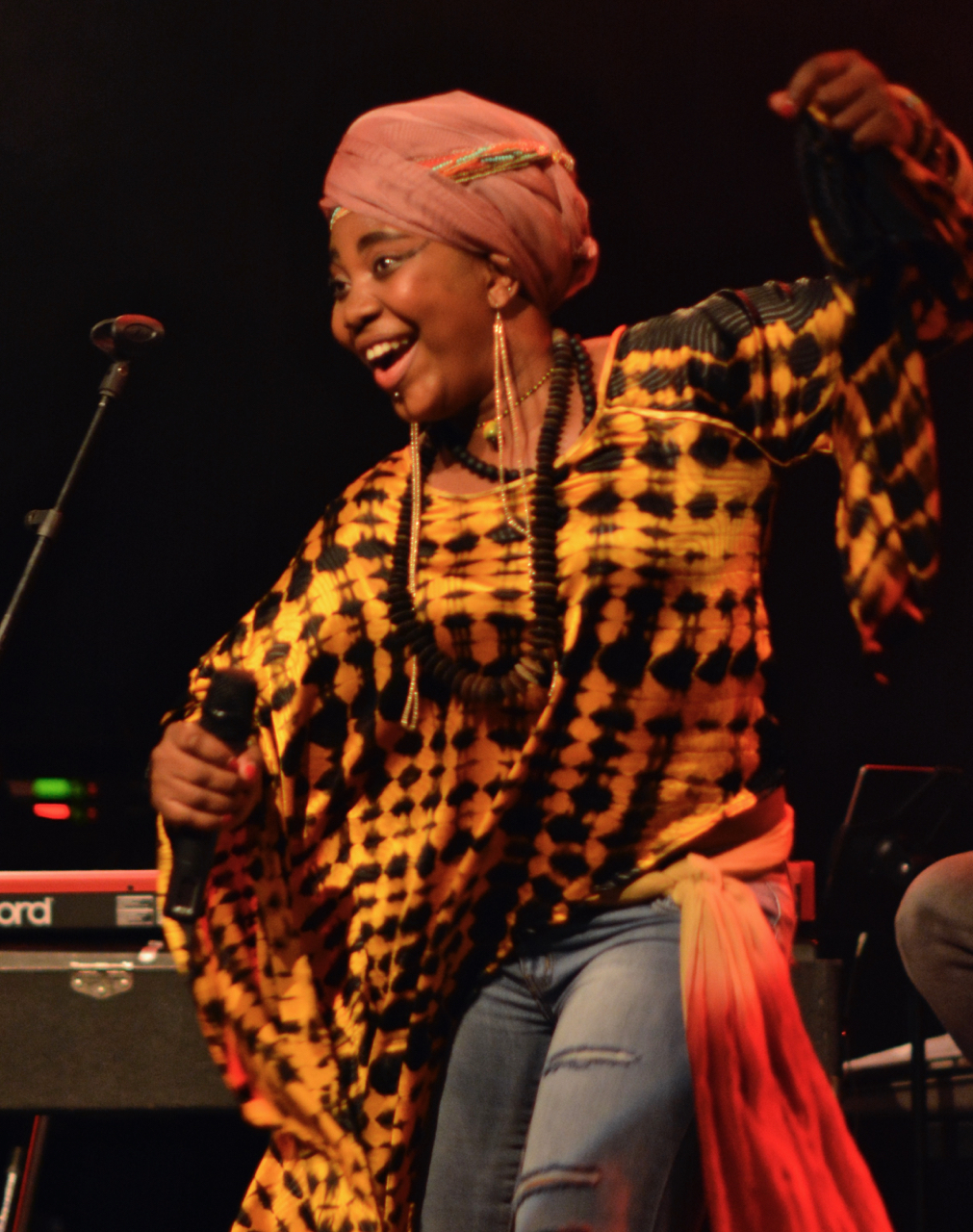
- Yvonne Mwale at a concert in 2016

Background information
- Born: 14 December 1988; Lusaka, Zambia
- Genres: World music, Jazz, Blues, Soul
- Occupation: Singer
- Years active: 2004–Present
- Labels: o-tone music, Caravan Records
- Website: www.yvonnemwale.com

Yvonne Mwale (born 14 December 1988 in Lusaka) is a Zambian Afro-Fusion, jazz and blues singer.

== Biography ==
Mwale was born in Lusaka in 1988 and raised in Petauke, Zambia. She is the daughter of former Honorable Member of Parliament Michael Mwale and former songstress Jelita Mwanza.

She started her musical education at seven years old and soon after began performing in different churches and choirs across the country. She joined the Zambian group B-Sharp as a vocalist where she received an advanced musical education from Jones Kabanga.

In 2009, Mwale was awarded with “Best Upcoming Female Artist” at the Ngoma Awards, the national music awards in Zambia. The same year, she formed a band with her friends named “Nyali”. The group, with Mwale as the lead singer, participated in the Music CrossRoads InterRegional Festival held in Livingstone Zambia in August 2009. Nyali won the competition and took home the prize for the first time ever for Zambia. Later that year, the U.S. embassy in Lusaka initiated a project for the Department of State of the United States of America. Mwale was asked to participate in a song based on one of Barack Obama’s popular speeches.

The following year, her band recorded its first album. They were invited to tour Europe where they would perform for several months in eight countries. On the African continent, South Africa and Malawi were destinations for performances.

In 2011, Mwale traveled to Tanzania, where she met her manager and started recording her solo album "Kalamatila". In January 2012, she signed with the Danish label Caravan Records. In 2013, she moved with her family to Germany where she recorded another album in Frankfurt. Her album "Ninkale - Let Me Be" was released in July 2014. In September 2016, her album "Msimbi Wakuda" was released.

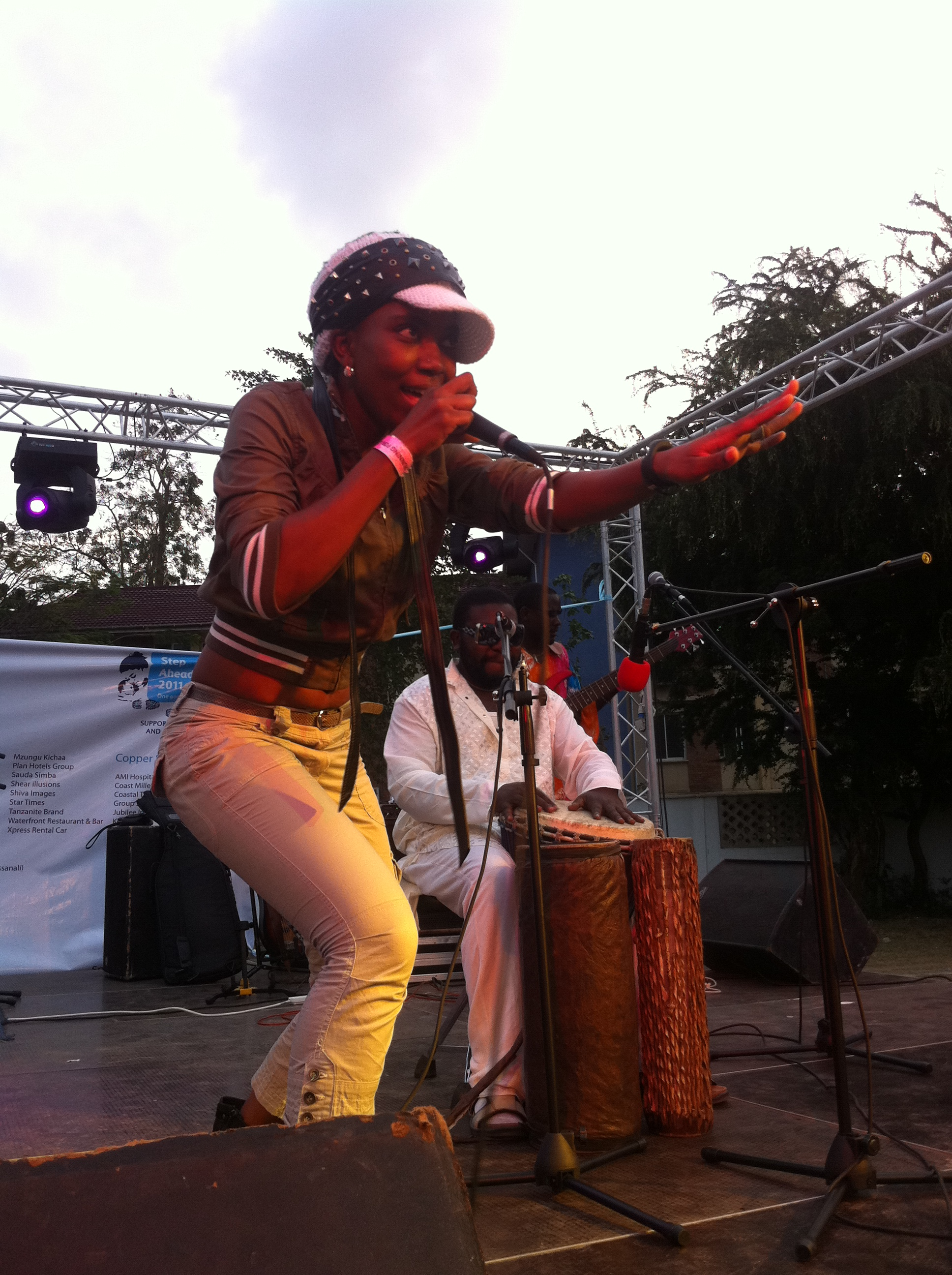
Yvonne Mwale Zambian musician performing in neighboring Country Tanzania in 2012

== Discography ==
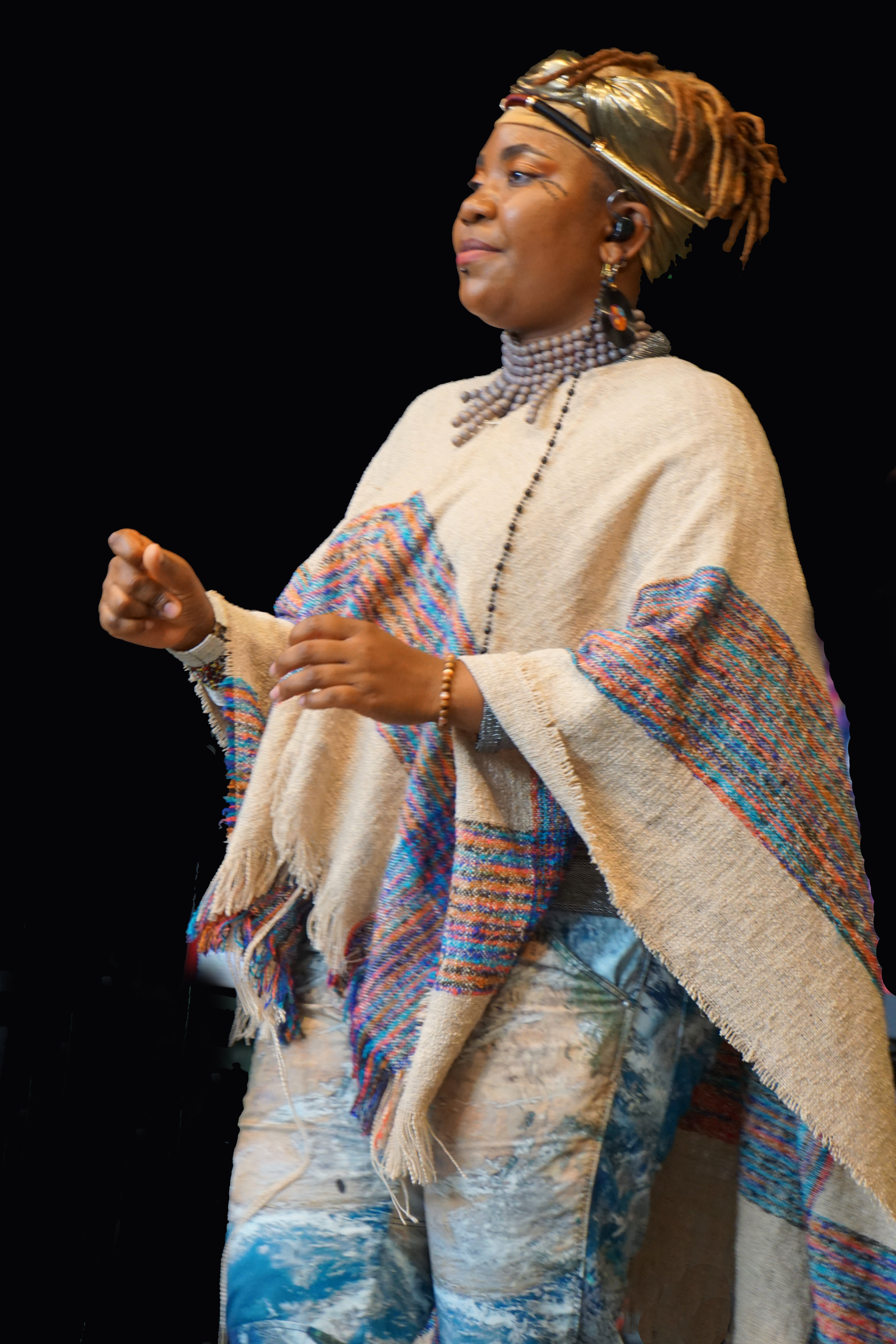
Yvonne Mwale at the Weltmusikfestival Horizonte in Koblenz (2018)

=== Albums ===
1. Vilimba (2010) (CD, with Nyali Band)
2. Kalamatila (2012) (CD Caravan Records)
3. Ninkale – Let Me Be (2014) (CD, o-tone music/Soulfood)
4. Msimbi Wakuda (2016) (CD, o-tone music/Soulfood).
5. free soul(2020),(CD, o-tone music/soulfood)

=== Music videos ===
1. Fight Like A Soldier (2012) (Dir. Matthias Krämer)
2. Sihitaji Marafiki with Fid Q (2012) (Dir. Mike Tee)
3. Familia Yangu (2012) (Dir. Matthias Krämer)
4. Can I Call You My Love (2014) (Dir. Matthias Krämer)

=== Awards and competitions ===
1. 2009 - Best upcoming Female Artist, Ngoma Awards, Zambia
2. 2009 - Winner of the Music CrossRoads InterRegional Competition
3. 2012 - 2nd winner of the Jahazi Jazz Competition
4. 2013 - Nominated at the Montreux Jazz Festival Vocal Competition
5. 2013 - Nominated in two categories at the Kilimanjaro Tanzania Music Awards
6. 2013 - Nominated for the “Africa’s Most Influential Women in Business and Government”-Awards 2013 - Finalist at the RFI Prix Decouverté 2013 (Radio France Internationale)
7. 2014 - Nominated for the Master-Jam Festival-Competition for Jazz- Improvisation Skills
8. 2018- Nominated at the world citizen awards and she came out in the second place
