= Tuver Wundi =

Congolese journalist

- Citizenship: Democratic Republic of the Congo
- Occupation: Journalist
- Employer: Radio-Télévision nationale congolaise (until 2025)
- Known for: Reporting on North Kivu

Tuver Tuverekwevyo Wundi is a Congolese journalist known for his reporting from North Kivu, where he was the provincial director of Radio-Télévision nationale congolaise in Goma until July 2025. He has reported on the M23 campaign, a conflict between the rebel Congo River Alliance and the government of the Democratic Republic of the Congo, which has heavily impacted North Kivu.

== Biography ==
A trained journalist, Wundi worked as the provincial director of RTNC Nord-Kivu, the RNC's local branch based in Goma covering news in North Kivu, one of the DRC's 25 provinces, located in the east of the country along the borders with Uganda and Rwanda. North Kivu had experienced ongoing conflict between government forces and rebel groups which had displaced 1.7 million people in the province. Wundi also served as the head of the non-governmental organisation Journaliste en danger, as well as serving as its North Kivu correspondent. Journaliste en danger was founded by Congolese journalists to defend and promote press freedom in the DRC.

In January 2025, the Congo River Alliance, a coalition of rebel groups and opposition political parties, launched an offensive to seize Goma, the provincial capital of North Kivu. Wundi reported on the battle between the rebels and the government until the city was fully captured by the CRA on 27 January, at which point RTNC Nord-Kivu temporarily halted broadcasting. It was reported that rebels had installed a new transmitter as well as other technical equipment at RTNC Nord-Kivu's headquarters in order to broadcast pro-rebel content. Staff did subsequently return to work, including Wundi, with broadcasts being overseen by the CRA as opposed to the central government.

On 25 February 2025, Wundi was detained by rebel forces while reporting from the Stade de l'Unité in Goma, where police officers had surrendered to rebel forces and had been in the process of being transferred to a military training camp run by the CRA. Wundi was detained for 11 days, with a spokesperson for M23, one of the member groups of the CRA, confirming he was being held for the purpose of "an investigation". Wundi was released on 7 March.

In July 2025, Wundi was dismissed from his position as provincial director of RTNC Nord-Kivu after reportedly refusing to alter programming to make it more favourable of the CRA. Anonymous reports in local independent media stated that Wundi had been accused by the CRA of "endangering state security and collaborating with the government". Following his dismissal, Wundi moved from Goma to Kinshasha, the capital of the DRC that remained under the control of the Congolese government.

On 27 August 2025, Wundi was arrested for a second time, this time by intelligence agents from the Congolese government. Wundi disappeared after leaving the offices of Journaliste en Danger in Kinshasa, where he had stated his intention to meet his friend for lunch. Wundi was reported as missing later that day when his wife reported that he had not returned to their hotel in Lingwala and that calls to both of his phones were not connecting. It was subsequently confirmed that Wundi was being "debriefed" by the Agence nationale de renseignements. Wundi was arrested without charge on 30 August.

== Response ==
The Committee to Protect Journalists has criticised harassment Wundi has experienced from both the Congolese government and from rebel groups, describing it as "a blatant attempt to intimidate the press and to deprive the Congolese public of crucial information about the ongoing conflict in eastern DRC".

Journaliste en danger and L'union nationale de la presse congolaise called for immediate clarification on the circumstances of Wundi's arrests, both by rebels and by the government, and called for guarantees of his safe and "deep concern" at his detention.
