= Agence Congolaise de Presse =

Congolese news agency

Agence congolaise de presse
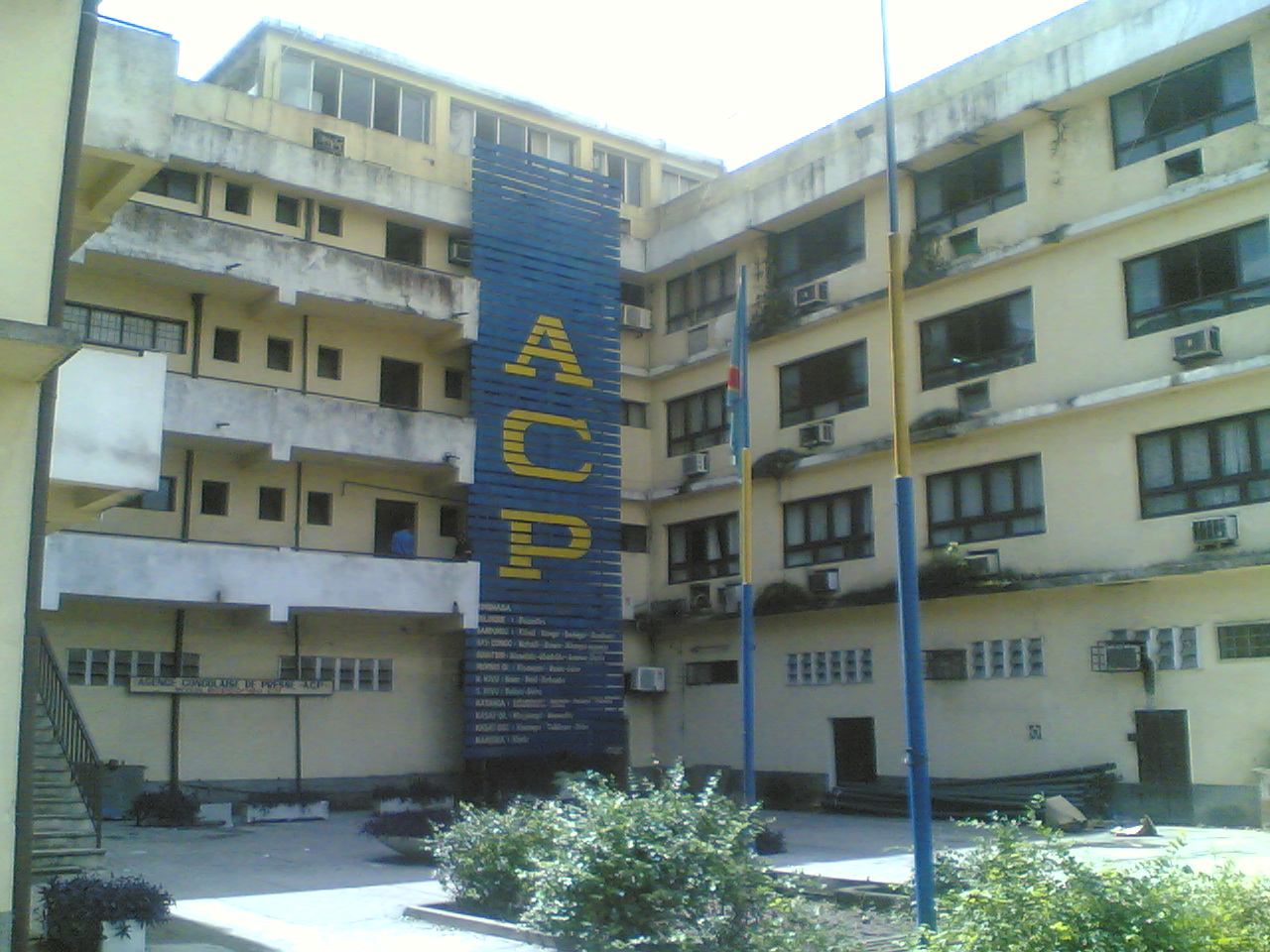
- ACP headquarters in Gombe, Kinshasa
- Type: State-owned public enterprise
- Industry: News agency
- Founded: 12 August 1960; 66 years ago
- Founder: Patrice Lumumba
- Headquarters: Gombe, Kinshasa, Democratic Republic of the Congo
- Key people: Ali Kalonga (chairman); Bienvenu-Marie Bakumanya Bakwala (director general); Jean-Médard Liwiso Mowelo (deputy director general)
- Owner: Government of the Democratic Republic of the Congo
- Number of employees: 614 (2014)
- Website: acp.cd

The Congolese Press Agency (French: Agence congolaise de presse; ACP) is the national news agency of the Democratic Republic of the Congo headquartered in Gombe, Kinshasa. It is a state-owned public institution under the Ministry of Communication and Media that gathers and distributes national and international news.

The ACP was established on 12 August 1960 by a decree of Prime Minister Patrice Lumumba, following the transfer of the activities and facilities of the Belgian news agency Belga's Kinshasa office. Its legal status as a public institution was formalized by Ordinance-Law No. 67-83 of 3 February 1967, which defined it as a technical, administrative, and commercial institution with legal personality. The agency was renamed the Zaire Press Agency (Agence Zaïre Presse; AZAP) in 1971, following the country's change of name. During the 1970s, the agency expanded its national network and international presence, including representations in Brussels, Paris, and Beijing, and developed relationships with foreign and African news agencies. The agency reverted to the name Agence congolaise de presse (ACP) in 1997 following the fall of Mobutu's government.

== History ==
The ACP was established on 12 August 1960 by a decree signed by Prime Minister Patrice Lumumba, only six weeks after the Congo gained independence. The agency took over the work and facilities of Belga, the Belgian news agency that had operated in the Belgian Congo.

In 1967, the ACP was granted legal status and became a public institution responsible for technical, administrative, and commercial activities. After the country was renamed Zaire in 1971, the agency was renamed the Zaire Press Agency (French: Agence Zaïre Presse; AZAP). Its new status was officially set by Ordinance-Law No. 73-038 of 19 September 1973.

During the 1970s, the agency had offices in different parts of the country. According to the Centre d'Étude en Communication de Masse (CECOM), it also had liaison offices in Beijing, Brussels, and Paris. AZAP also exchanged information with major international news agencies such as Reuters, Agence France-Presse, and Belga, as well as African news agencies.

In 1981, a new ordinance placed AZAP within the public-enterprise framework established by Law No. 78-002 of 6 January 1978. The agency was managed by a nine-member board of directors, a management committee, and a board of auditors. It operated under the supervision of the presidency.

After Mobutu Sese Seko's government fell in 1997 and the country returned to the name Democratic Republic of the Congo, the agency also returned to its former name, Agence Congolaise de Presse (ACP). In June 2006, part of the parking area at ACP's headquarters was fenced off and trees on the site were removed. ACP employees denounced the occupation as an unlawful appropriation of the agency's property and called for the work to be halted. In May 2008, a National Assembly commission investigating the unlawful appropriation of state-owned land and buildings concluded that ACP property had been illegally acquired. The commission also criticized a Lebanese national Hassan Dakhlallah for refusing to provide technical documents relating to the case. The National Assembly adopted the commission's report and recommended canceling contracts involving illegally acquired state property and prosecuting those responsible.

Later, Decree No. 09/50 of 3 December 2009 defined its main governing bodies as the board of directors, the directorate-general, and the board of auditors. The agency was subsequently placed under the Ministry of Communication and Media.

== Organization ==
=== Governance ===
The ACP is owned by the government of the Democratic Republic of the Congo and operates under the supervision of the Ministry of Communication and Media. Its governing bodies consist of a board of directors, a directorate-general, and a board of auditors.

The board of directors is the agency's policy-making, supervisory, and decision-making body. It defines the ACP's general policies and programs, approves its budget and annual financial statements, and sets its organizational structure and staff regulations, subject to approval by the Ministry of Communication and Media. The board may have up to five members, including the director general. Its members are appointed by the president of the republic for renewable five-year terms. The board's chairperson must not be a member of the directorate-general.

The directorate-general is responsible for the ACP's daily administration. It implements decisions adopted by the board, executes the budget, prepares financial statements, directs the agency's departments, and represents it in dealings with third parties. It consists of a director general assisted by a deputy director general, both appointed by the president for renewable five-year terms.

The board of auditors supervises the agency's financial operations. It consists of two auditors drawn from separate professional organizations and has relevant technical and professional experience. They are appointed by the prime minister for nonrenewable five-year terms.

In September 2022, President Félix Tshisekedi appointed a new leadership team for the ACP, including Tharcisse Kasongo Mwema Yamba Yamba, Bienvenu-Marie Bakumanya Bakwala, Jean-Médard Liwiso Mowelo, Mulumba Tshiani, Ali Kalonga, and Jean-Pierre Kezamudru Musisiri. Bakumanya was appointed director general and Liwiso became deputy director general. Kasongo became chairman of the board of directors. However, following his death on 12 November, Kezamudru was appointed acting chairman in January 2023 by the Minister of Communication and Media Patrick Muyaya Katembwe. In September 2024, Kalonga was appointed acting chairman and officially took office the following month.

=== Functions ===
As a national news agency, the ACP covers a broad range of political, economic, social, cultural, health, environmental, and judicial issues. Its reports are distributed to newspapers, broadcasters, websites, and other media organizations. The agency also provides specialized services, including visual content, economic and business reporting, and fact-checking.

It maintains its headquarters in Gombe, Kinshasa, and operates through provincial directorates and regional offices. In 2014, the agency was reported to have 614 employees and managers, of whom 486 were based in Kinshasa and 128 in the provinces. It operated 34 regional offices and maintained departments responsible for central news production, documentation and archives, specialized publications, human resources, finance, technical services, commerce, marketing, general services, research and projects, and internal auditing.

The ACP historically produced printed and electronic news bulletins. During the 2020s, the agency expanded its online operations and added photography, video, infographics, social media distribution, and fact-checking to its services. On 11 August 2025, it launched a new YouTube channel as part of its transition toward multimedia production.
