= Radio Le Messager du Peuple =

Congolese community radio station

- Uvira, South Kivu; Democratic Republic of the Congo
- Frequencies: 88.0 MHz; 94.0 MHz; 93.5 MHz

Programming
- Languages: French, Swahili, local dialects

Ownership
- Owner: Mission des Jacobins Sages (MIJAS)

History
- First air date: 2005
- Former names: Le Messager du Peuple

Radio Le Messager du Peuple (RMP), meaning "the People's Messenger Radio", is a community radio station located at Kakungwe Avenue in Rombe 1 quartier (quarter) of the Mulongwe commune in Uvira. Established in 2005 by the non-governmental organization MIJAS (Mission des Jacobins Sages), the station was created in response to persistent demands from Uvira's residents for impartial and accessible information. These demands emerged prominently during the tenth anniversary celebration of MIJAS, where participants called for the establishment of a local radio outlet to address the daily information deficit. At the time, the state-affiliated broadcaster RTNC-Uvira was widely perceived as partisan and unable to meet the public's need for balanced reporting.

The station broadcasts on FM frequencies: 88.0 MHz, 94.0 MHz, and 93.5 MHz. Its signal covers a 10-square-kilometer radius around Uvira and reaches neighboring areas such as Kiliba, Makobola, and Gatumba in Burundi. Programming is delivered in French, Swahili, and local dialects. As a platform for grassroots voices, Radio Le Messager du Peuple offers a diverse range of daily programming, including interactive talk shows, community-focused broadcasts, educational entertainment, and a wide selection of music. With support from Cordaid, MIJAS distributed thousands of radios and helped establish nine radio clubs across Uvira, two of which remain active today.

Since January 2018, RMP has expanded its services to include television broadcasting.

== History ==
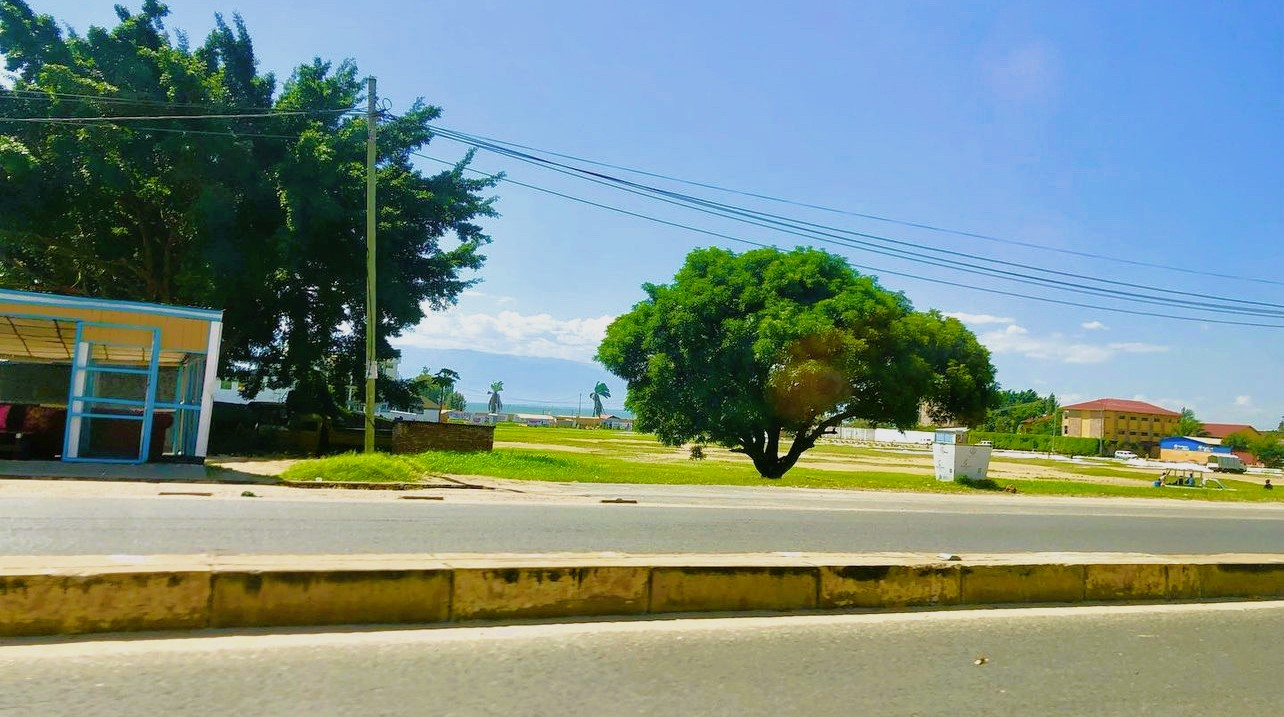
Mulongwe, a commune of Uvira, is where Radio Le Messager du Peuple was founded.

Radio Le Messager du Peuple (RMP) was established as an outgrowth of the non-profit organization Mission des Jacobins Sages (MIJAS), founded on 25 April 1995 in Uvira. MIJAS was created with the mission of promoting non-violence and human rights advocacy through the principles of Jacobinisme, a doctrine emphasizing civic education, peaceful resistance, and the defense of rights without the use of violence.

In its early years, MIJAS implemented a variety of educational and cultural tools to instill these values in the community. These included a theatrical troupe dedicated to peace education, a small community library offering resources on non-violence, and a monthly newsletter titled Messager du Peuple. Published in 750 copies, with 500 in French and 250 in Swahili, this newsletter served as MIJAS's primary means of communication and outreach. It was produced with support from Centre Lokole, the Bukavu office of Search for Common Ground (SFCG), which coordinated peacebuilding efforts across the region.

The idea for a radio station emerged from growing concerns about limited access to reliable and unbiased information in Uvira, especially during the tenth anniversary of MIJAS in 2005. At the time, the state-run broadcaster RTNC-Uvira was perceived as partisan and insufficient in addressing the everyday informational needs of the local population. Participants in the anniversary celebrations explicitly recommended the establishment of a community radio station to fill this gap. Although the exact date of RMP's founding varies across sources, the year 2005 is widely accepted. According to Bènèdict Baraka Bukuru of the Université Libre Baptiste du Congo, the station was officially launched on 13 July 2005 to replace the monthly newsletter, which had limited reach due to literacy constraints and scarcity of printed materials. He emphasized that the station was created with an editorial mandate to combat ignorance and promote sustainable sociocultural and economic development. Conversely, Passy Walumbuka Kigogo of the Institut Supérieur de Développement Rural d'Uvira (ISDR-Uvira) cites 15 June 2005 as the official launch date, aligning it with the recommendations made during the MIJAS anniversary event.

== Organization and operation ==
RMP operates as a direct initiative and project of MIJAS, which retains administrative oversight through its Board of Directors. Its organizational structure consists of a General Director, a Deputy General Director, a Head of Programming and Production, a Head of Administration, and a Head of Technical and Control Room Services.

The station broadcasts on FM frequencies 88.0 MHz, 94.0 MHz, and 93.5 MHz. Programming is broadcast in French (50%), Swahili (35%), and local dialects (15%). The station's signal covers an area of approximately 10 square kilometers, reaching nearby areas such as Kiliba to the north, Makobola to the south, and Gatumba in neighboring Burundi. In January 2018, RMP expanded its operations with the launch of a television broadcasting service. Its objectives include, among others, educating, informing, and raising awareness among individuals to shield them from all forms of violence, as well as breaking the media isolation of Uvira and Fizi Territories. RMP provides a variety of services aimed at education, awareness, and cultural exchange. The station features entertainment segments built around different themes, developed by various hosts. These themes are carefully chosen by the production team based on current events to raise public awareness and educate listeners. The station also offers three types of programs: sponsored broadcasts, original in-house productions, which are mostly aired live and sometimes include open phone lines for listener participation, and community-oriented programs designed to foster intercultural dialogue among groups such as the Bafuliru, Bavira, Babembe, Barega, Bashi, and Banyamulenge. In addition, RMP plays music intended to soothe emotional tension, with 40% of the music being educational, 35% general entertainment, 10% religious songs, 5% instrumental tracks, and 10% consisting of songs in local languages or dialects.

The station also supports various radio clubs, such as community-based listener groups that engage in collective listening, discussion, and local development actions inspired by the station's programming. These clubs operate on the "see – judge – act" methodology. With support from Cordaid, MIJAS distributed 4,000 small radio sets and 8,000 batteries to promote listenership, including among returnees from Tanzania. This initiative led to the creation of nine radio clubs across Uvira's 14 neighborhoods (quartiers). As of recent reports, two of these clubs remain active and continue to organize community service and solidarity activities. One of RMP's flagship programs is Amka Tujenge ("Let's Wake Up to Rebuild"), which airs daily. The program serves as a platform for community members to report on local socio-security issues, encourage information-sharing, and provide a voice to marginalized populations.
