= Radio-Télévision nationale congolaise =

National broadcaster of the Democratic Republic of the Congo

- Type: Public broadcasting
- Country: DR Congo
- First air date: 24 November 1966
- Availability: National
- Founded: Léopoldville, Belgian Congo
- Headquarters: RTNC Congo Building, Lingwala, Kinshasa
- Broadcast area: Nationwide
- Owner: Government of the Democratic Republic of the Congo
- Key people: Floribert Lubota Ngwangu (President of the board of directors); Sylvie Elenge Nyembo (Director general); José-Adolphe Voto Tongba (Deputy director general)
- Launch date: 1971; 55 years ago
- Former names: Radio Congo Belge; Radiodiffusion Nationale Congolaise; Radiodiffusion-Télévision Nationale Congolaise; Office Zaïrois de Radiodiffusion et de Télévision
- Official website: rtnc.cd
- Language: French; Lingala; Kikongo; Swahili; Tshiluba

Radio Télévision nationale congolaise (RTNC) is the national public broadcaster of the Democratic Republic of the Congo. It is headquartered in the RTNC Building in Lingwala, Kinshasa, and operates radio and television services throughout the country. Its programming includes news, current affairs, education, culture, and entertainment, broadcast in French and the country's four national languages: Lingala, Kikongo, Swahili, and Tshiluba.

The RTNC originated as Radio Congo Belge (RCB), established by the colonial authorities in 1940. After independence in 1960, it became Radiodiffusion Nationale Congolaise (RNC). On November 1966, the RNC became known as the RTNC following the introduction of television broadcasting. The television service later became known as Télé-Zaïre in 1972, and in 1981 the national broadcaster was reorganized as the Office Zaïrois de Radiodiffusion et de Télévision (OZRT). It adopted its present name following the fall of Mobutu's government in 1997.

Since its reorganization under Decree No. 09/62 of 3 December 2009, the RTNC has operated as a sociocultural public institution under the supervision of the Ministry of Communication and Media.

== History ==
=== 1937–1960: Colonial radio broadcasting ===
According to Congolese jurist and author Jonathan Kendwa Ndwaya, Jesuit missionaries established the private station Radio Léo in January 1937 at Collège Albert 1er, now Collège Boboto, to train an African elite, with an emphasis on classical music. Canadian social anthropologist Bob W. White noted that Belgian radio enthusiast and entrepreneur Jean Hourdebise established the first commercial radio station in the Belgian Congo in 1939. His Radio Congolia broadcast local and international news in four African languages—Tshiluba, Kikongo, Swahili, and Lingala—and was the first station to install loudspeakers for broadcasts in the African quarters of the city. Kendwa also noted that the colonial authorities confiscated the missionaries' station in 1940 following the outbreak of World War II. The confiscation marked the official establishment of Radio Congo Belge (RCB), which "remained intended exclusively for Europeans", with Africans excluded from accessing it as a source of information.

French historian and researcher Charlotte Grabli noted that on 1 January 1949, the colonial authorities inaugurated Radio Congo Belge pour Africains (RCBA) as a substitute for traditional communication methods such as the tam-tam. Radio was thus incorporated into the colonial project of extending Belgian influence while adapting existing forms of communication. The programming consisted of news bulletins and programs specifically devoted to civic and moral education. These programs were generally broadcast in all four national languages—Lingala, Kikongo, Tshiluba, and Kiswahili—for the benefit of the indigenous population, while French-language broadcasts were intended specifically for Europeans and the évolués. Broadcasts opened with a musical march known as the uélé, adapted from indigenous rhythms and named after the Uélé River region in the Oriental Province. Performed by the Force Publique, the uélé promoted a supra-ethnic identity while reinforcing colonial ethnic classifications. RCBA director Karel Theunissen identified five major groups: Bangala, Bakongo, Baluba, Baswahili, and Banyarwanda. Within this colonial framework, Congolese announcers and musicians began developing their own forms of expression. Pauline Lisanga joined RCBA in 1949 as its first female presenter. A member of the Bapoto community, she became known for her broadcasting work and was among the earliest female performers of Congolese rumba. Unlike some other colonial radio services, RCBA, later renamed Émissions Africaines, promoted local music from the outset.

=== 1960–1971: Radiodiffusion Nationale Congolaise and RTNC ===
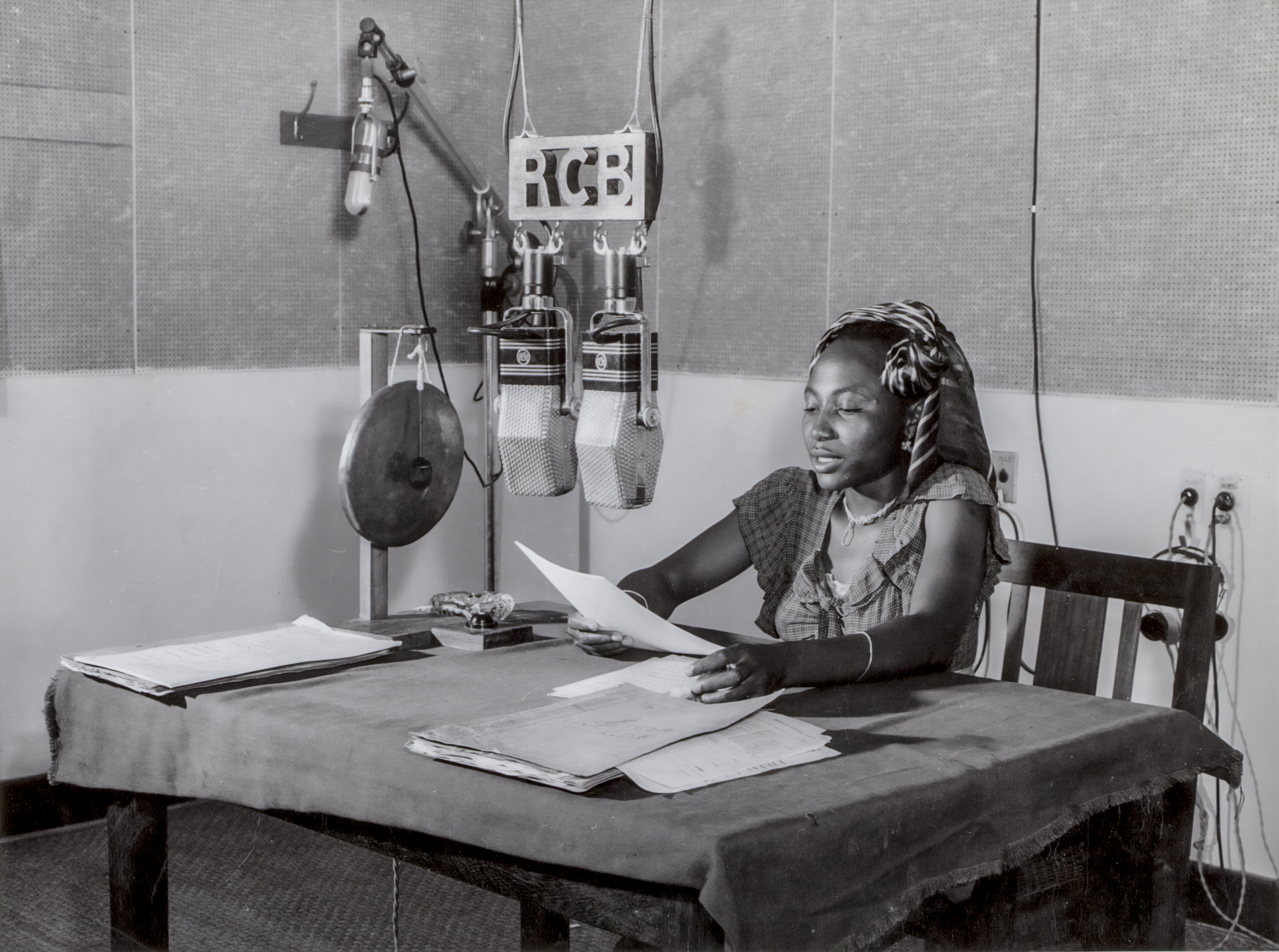
Pauline Lisanga, the first Congolese presenter for RCB in an undated photograph taken by Inforcongo Carlo Lamote.

Following the Congo's independence on 30 June 1960, RCB became Radiodiffusion Nationale Congolaise (RNC), headquartered in Léopoldville and operating a 50-kilowatt transmitter. During the Congo Crisis, control of the station became strategically important to Patrice Lumumba, Joseph Kasa-Vubu, and United Nations forces, while Radio Brazzaville was also used at times. As the country fragmented into rival regional administrations, stations in Orientale, South Kasai, Kivu, and Katanga broadcast their own accounts of local and national events and sometimes transmitted official messages between the competing governments.

RNC's national service broadcast from Léopoldville on shortwave at 11,755 kHz (25.52 metres). Its programming, which sometimes extended to 20 hours per day, reached audiences throughout the Congo and abroad. European broadcasts were transmitted in French, English, German, Spanish, Italian, and Portuguese, while news and feature programs were also presented in Kiswahili, Tshiluba, Kikongo, Lingala, and other African languages. Separate broadcasts directed toward the Americas were transmitted in English, French, Spanish, and Portuguese. In September 1961, the central government, through Information Minister Joseph Iléo, unsuccessfully requested a 100-kilowatt transmitter from the United States. Although RNC's existing transmitter had a nominal capacity of 50 kilowatts, it was operating at a maximum output of seven kilowatts. In the summer of 1961, RNC journalists Simon Gombo and François Kabeya studied radio journalism at Syracuse University through the U.S. State Department's Leader Exchange Program. With guidance from university faculty, they produced a study titled New Horizons for Radio Congo, which examined techniques for reaching different segments of the Congolese audience. It included simplified scripts and informal dialogues designed to explain unfamiliar or complex subjects. Gombo and Kabeya concluded that simplified programming was necessary and could be effective, but cautioned that audiences might reject it if it were explicitly labeled "simplified".

One of the most prominent breakaway stations was Radio Katanga in Élisabethville (now Lubumbashi). In 1961, Katangese and United Nations forces fought for control of its headquarters. The station broadcast news, features, and music in English, French, and Swahili on 11,866 kHz (25.58 metres). It also operated two shortwave transmitters carrying programs in Swahili, French, Tshiluba, Bemba, Sanga, and other local languages. Its programming included women's features, educational content, and programs intended for the armed forces and police. Several low-powered clandestine stations also began broadcasting in late 1960. Most operated from Katanga and Kivu and supported regional separatist movements, although their influence was reportedly limited. In 1963, the African Technical Service for Broadcasting (Service technique africain de radiodiffusion, STAR) was established in cooperation with the RNC to develop educational and cultural programming. Its production center in Kinshasa created tape-recorded educational programs for transmission through the RTNC network.

On November 1966, the organization became known as Congolese National Radio and Television (Radio-télévision nationale congolaise; RTNC) following the introduction of television broadcasting. The Ministry of Information defined its three principal functions as information, education, and entertainment and regarded its integration with the national radio service as a means of supporting national development. It operated for three hours each evening on VHF channel 5. The service was developed under a 1965 agreement between the Ministry of Information and France's Office de coopération radiophonique (OCORA). OCORA planned and installed equipment manufactured by the Radio Corporation of America (RCA) and established television-production and equipment-maintenance training for Congolese personnel. A television service also began operating in Lubumbashi in collaboration with the College of Saint Francis de Sales. In 1969, Kinshasa had an estimated 10,000 to 11,000 television sets, while Lubumbashi had approximately 2,000. Broadcasts from Brazzaville could also be received in Kinshasa. In September 1969, the first planned television viewing center was inaugurated in Menkao, about 40 miles (64 km) northeast of Kinshasa. Additional centers were planned for villages within range of the Kinshasa and Lubumbashi stations.

Television RTNC broadcast facilities of the Congo as of 1968:

	Kinshasa	Lubumbashi
Modulation	FM	FM
Polarization	HP	HP
Band W	7000	8000
Lines	625	625
Frames	25	25
Video Power		5
Frequency		215250
		221750

Before April 1967, the country had three private radio stations: two in Lubumbashi and one in Kinshasa. The Kinshasa station, operated by the Roman Catholic secondary school Collège Albert 1er (now Collège Boboto), broadcast religious programming for two hours on Sunday mornings. In Lubumbashi, the Collège Saint-François de Sales operated Radio Collège, which broadcast in French, Swahili, and Bemba during evenings and on Sundays. Supported by the Salesian missionary order and voluntary contributions, it operated FM, shortwave, and medium-wave transmitters and began limited television broadcasting in 1966. Another Lubumbashi station, UFAC, was operated by the Katanga Veterans and broadcast 26 hours per week in French, Flemish, English, and Swahili. In April 1967, the government suspended all private radio stations, although Radio Collège was permitted to continue operating its television service in collaboration with the RTNC. From 1966, officials placed particular emphasis on educational programming and regarded radio as an important means of communicating government policy and current information throughout the country. They also viewed national radio as a means of promoting unity among the country's ethnic groups. In 1968, STAR announced plans to establish rural listening centers and develop a "school of the air", with pilot projects underway by 1969. The ban remained in force in 1969, leaving the RTNC as the country's only domestic broadcaster.

By that year, the country had an estimated 800,000 radio receivers and a listening audience of between four and five million. Earlier that year in March, the Ministry of Information announced an agreement with a French company to install a 600-kilowatt transmitter in Kinshasa for the Voice of African Brotherhood (La Voix de la Fraternité Africaine)'s external service. Scheduled to begin operating in early 1970, the transmitter was intended to extend coverage across Central Africa. The agreement also provided for the installation of a 300-kilowatt transmitter in Kisangani in 1970 and another transmitter in Lubumbashi in 1971.

The government operated eight radio stations: two in Kinshasa and six in provincial capitals. Radio RTNC broadcast facilities in the Congo as of 1968: (Note: Multiple listing of the same station on different frequencies does not necessarily indicate the number of transmitters since one transmitter may operate on several frequencies.)

Location	Power (in kilowatts)	Wave length	Frequency	Transmitter type²	Band
Kinshasa	1	225.40	1331	CFTH (Note: CFTH, Compagnie Française Thomas-Houston)	MW
	10	63.69	4710	—	—
	10	50.05	4880	BB (Note: BB, Brown Bovery)	—
	10	42.16	7115	—	—
	10	41.84	7170	BB	SW
	50	41.75	7185	RCA (Note: RCA, Radio Corporation of America)	SW
	50	31.06	9660	CFTH	SW
	10	30.69	9775	—	—
	100	25.43	11790	CFTH	SW
	100	19.68	15245	—	—
	(250 watts)	61.48	90	Gates	FM
Bukavu	10	61.04	4889	BB	SW
Kisangani	10	49.30	6085	—	—
Lubumbashi	10	63.22	4745	BB	SW
	10	50.35	5958	Marconi	SW
	7.5	41.64	7205	—	—
Lubumbashi (Kilobelobe)	20	31.45	9450	RCA	—
	100	25.43	11795	—	—
	100	25.28	11866³	BB	SW
Luluabourg	10	48.98	6125	BB	SW
Mbandaka	10	61.95	5993	BB	SW
Mbuji-Mayi	20	41.12	7295	—	—

The most powerful transmitters were located in Kinshasa and Lubumbashi in the early 1970s. The Voice of African Brotherhood broadcast in French, English, and Portuguese from a 100-kilowatt transmitter at Kilobelobe, near Lubumbashi. The government defined the national network's objectives as providing domestic and international news, entertainment, and education.

=== 1972–present: Télé-Zaire, Office Zaïrois de Radiodiffusion et de Télévision, and RTNC ===
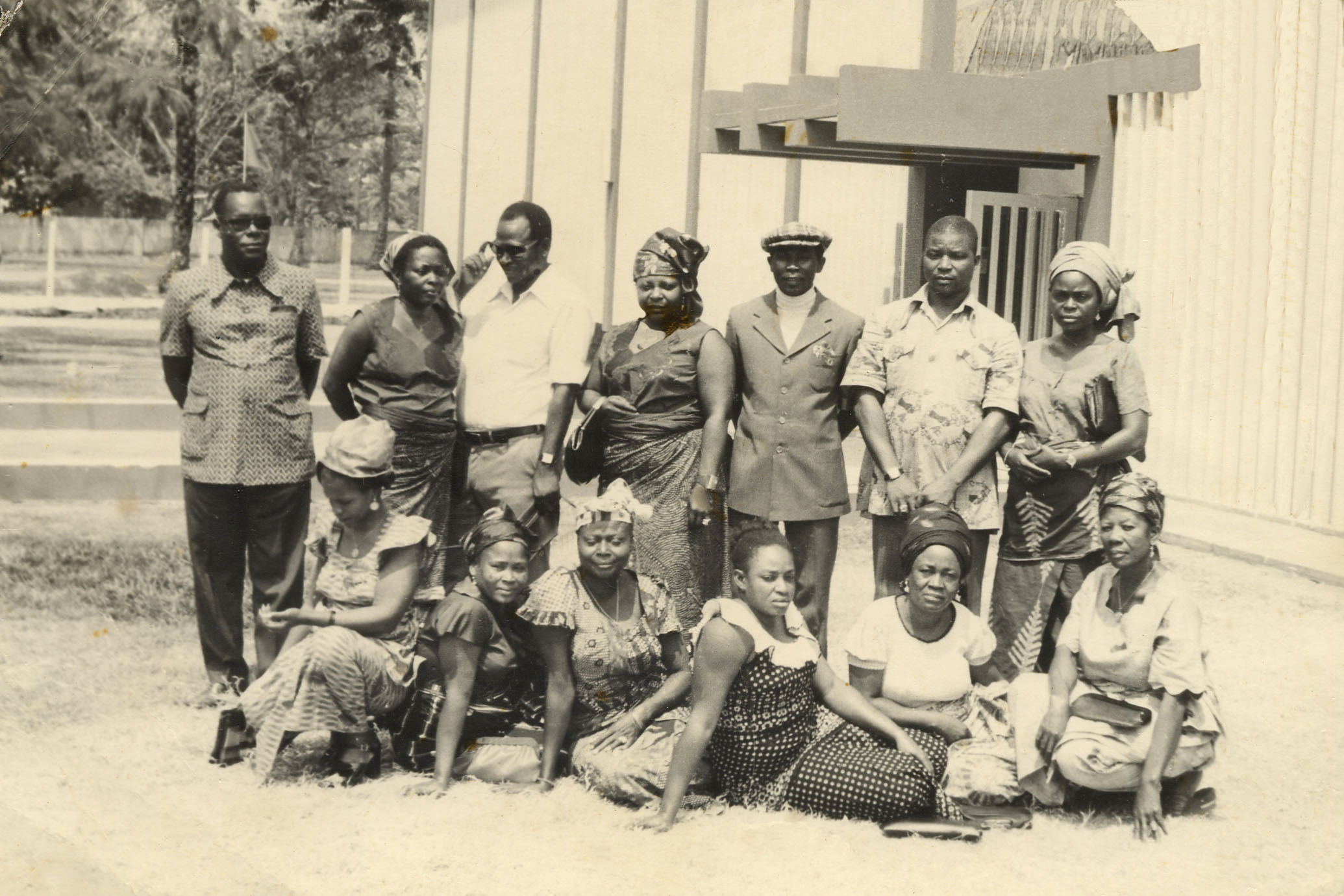
Members of the Bakolo Miziki dance troupe at the national television studios in 1977.

By 1971, following the renaming of the country to Zaire, the television station was known as Télé-Zaire, and had its broadcasting hours extended (6pm to 11pm weekdays and 10am or 1pm to 11pm weekends). It was placed under the legal framework governing public enterprises and acquired public-enterprise status. Programming was mainly dedicated to news and current affairs topics, with smaller proportions of educational and entertainment programming. In preparation for the start of color broadcasts in 1974, Télé-Zaïre received US$1.6 million investments from RCA, which not only saw the implementation of color television, but also increased the facilities in Kinshasa. Throughout the 1970s, Télé-Zaïre served educational and training purposes and had considerable influence on Zairian society, although it became increasingly politicized under Mobutu's regime.

On 24 November 1976, RTNC inaugurated the Cité de la Voix du Zaïre, which served as its headquarters.

In 1981, an ordinance transformed Télé-Zaire from a state-owned enterprise into a public institution under the name Zairian Broadcasting and Television Office (Office Zaïrois de Radiodiffusion et de Télévision; OZRT), entrusted with a mission of general interest. The reform came amid a political crisis surrounding the legitimacy of the one-party system and the constitutionality of practices carried out in its name. OZRT was also the only Zairian agency to broadcast on the airwaves since the 1972 law. The station was made available on satellite in the 90s using the Intelsat system to deliver its signals; most relay relay stations in the country's inland were dependent on available power supplies. Since political liberalization in the 1990s, other private companies have broadcast audiovisual media.

During the First Congo War, forces of the Alliance of Democratic Forces for the Liberation of Congo (AFDL) seized the broadcaster's facilities as part of their campaign to overthrow Mobutu's government. Following Mobutu's removal from power in 1997, the OZRT was renamed Radio-Télévision Nationale Congolaise (RTNC). The broadcaster subsequently underwent further institutional changes as the country transitioned toward political pluralism. On 3 December 2009, Decree No. 09/62 formally established the RTNC as a sociocultural public institution with legal personality.

== Legal status and organization ==
=== Legal status ===
The RTNC is governed by Decree No. 09/62 of 3 December 2009, which defines it as a sociocultural public institution with legal personality. The decree amended and supplemented Ordinance No. 81-050 of 2 April 1981, which established the Zairian Broadcasting and Television Office (Office Zaïrois de Radiodiffusion et de Télévision, OZRT). Under the decree, the OZRT's assets, rights, and liabilities were transferred to the RTNC by legal succession, along with its existing contracts and other obligations. The RTNC is headquartered in Lingwala, Kinshasa and maintains provincial branches.

Under the 1981 law establishing the institution, its mandate comprised three functions: operating public radio and television services; informing, training, and educating the public; and producing and promoting films and related audiovisual works. The 2009 decree broadened this mandate. Article 4 states that the RTNC is responsible for providing public radio and television services in accordance with applicable laws and regulations.

=== Responsibilities and operations ===
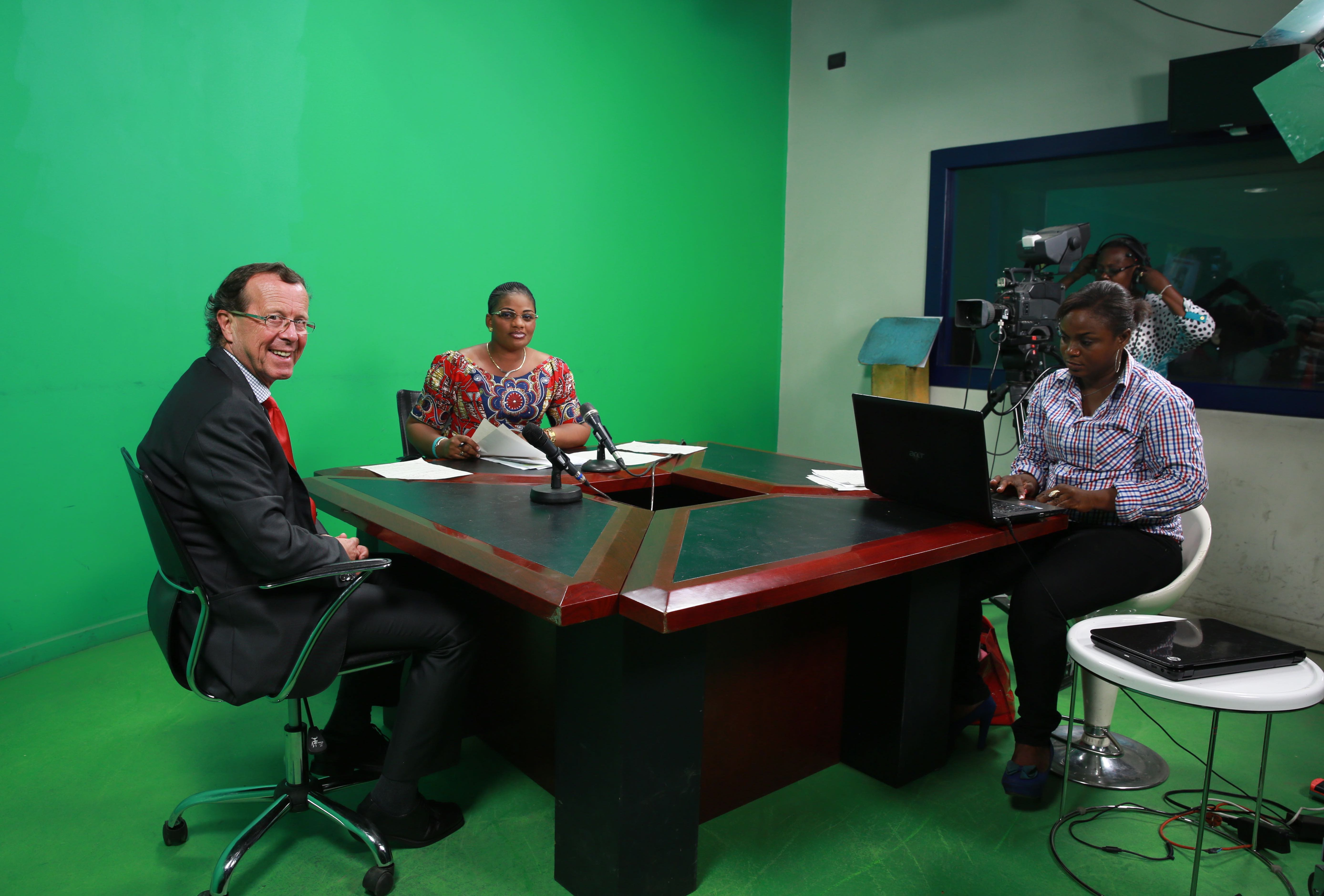
Martin Kobler, Special Representative of the UN Secretary-General and head of MONUSCO, in the studio of the RTNC in Kinshasa

Its responsibilities include covering political, economic, and social affairs; producing and broadcasting artistic and educational programs; producing, co-producing, distributing, and broadcasting audiovisual and film works domestically and internationally; and promoting Congolese culture abroad. The RTNC is also authorized to enter into agreements with government bodies and other organizations for the production and exchange of programs and to publicize the activities and programs of state institutions.

In 2010, RTNC employed more than 2,300 staff members, over 1,000 of whom were based in Kinshasa. It broadcasts in five languages: French, Kikongo, Swahili, Tshiluba, and Lingala.

==== Radio ====
- RTNC Chaîne nationale
- RTNC Kinshasa
- RTNC Bandundu
- RTNC Bukavu
- RTNC Goma
- RTNC Kat (Lubumbashi)
- RTNC Kindu
- RTNC Kisangani
- RTNC Mbuji-Mayi
- RTNC Mbandaka

Its radio services include two Kinshasa frequencies carrying the national radio service and the local FM station, RTN.

==== Television ====
RTNC operates two television channels: RTNC 1, a national news channel, and RTNC 2, created in 1996 from the remnants of RATELESCO (Radio Télévision Scolaire), which focuses on entertainment and broadcasts only in Kinshasa. It also operates ten provincial stations with financial autonomy, although Kinshasa funds staff salaries. In the early 2000s, RTNC seized Canal Kin Télévision and TKM, renaming them RTNC3 and RTNC4 in the process.

=== Governance ===
The RTNC is subject to oversight by the Ministry of Communication and Media, which acts as its supervisory authority, and the High Council for Audiovisual Media and Communication (Conseil supérieur de l'audiovisuel et de la communication, CSAC), which serves as the regulatory authority. The ministry oversees the institution's administration, while the CSAC regulates matters relating to audiovisual communication and information.

RTNC is governed by three bodies: the board of directors, general management, and the board of statutory auditors. The board of directors sets the institution's general policy, approves its program of activities and budget, and approves its annual financial statements. It also establishes RTNC's organizational structure and, on the recommendation of general management, its staffing framework and personnel regulations, subject to approval by the Minister of Communication and Media. The board consists of no more than five members, including the director general. Members are appointed and removed by order of the president of the republic following a government proposal deliberated by the Council of Ministers. They serve five-year terms, renewable once. The president of the republic appoints the chairperson from among the board members, and the chairperson may not be a member of general management.

The law specifies the appointment procedure and terms of office for members of the board of directors but does not expressly establish selection criteria. Kendwa argues that, in practice, appointments to senior positions in Congolese public institutions frequently favor individuals aligned with the government in power. He considers this a weakness in the legal framework and argues that the absence of clear selection criteria creates ambiguity in its application.

The board of directors meets quarterly in ordinary session and may be convened in extraordinary session by its chairperson at the request of the Minister of Communication and Media. A quorum requires three-fifths of the board's members. If a quorum is not reached, a second meeting may be held without a quorum requirement. Decisions are adopted by a majority of members present, with the chairperson holding the casting vote in the event of a tie. The board also adopts internal rules of procedure, subject to approval by the Minister of Communication and Media.

Leadership since 2022:

Name	Position	Ref.
Floribert Lubota Ngwangu	President of the board of directors	
Sylvie Elenge Nyembo	Director general and board member	
José-Adolphe Voto Tongba	Deputy director general	
Jean-Pierre Wafuana	Member of the board of directors	
Pie Gérard	Member of the board of directors	
Djeny Kaninda	Member of the board of directors	

General management implements the decisions of the board of directors and oversees the day-to-day administration of RTNC. It executes the budget, prepares financial statements, directs the institution's services, and represents RTNC in dealings with third parties. General management is headed by director general, who is assisted by the deputy director general. They are appointed for five-year terms, renewable once. In the absence or incapacity of the director general, the deputy director general serves as acting director general. If the deputy is unavailable, a serving director designated by the Minister of Communication and Media on the recommendation of general management assumes the role. RTNC is represented in legal proceedings by the director general or, in his absence, by an authorized replacement. The director general, deputy director general, and directors may not participate directly or indirectly in RTNC public procurement contracts for themselves or companies in which they have an interest. They are also subject to statutory rules governing incompatibility with public office.

The board of statutory auditors oversees RTNC's financial operations. It consists of two professionally qualified members appointed by decree of the Prime Minister, following deliberation by the Council of Ministers on the proposal of the Minister of Communication and Media. They serve five-year, non-renewable terms and may be removed for misconduct. The statutory auditors have broad powers to examine RTNC's financial records, assets, inventories, and financial statements and to verify financial information contained in reports of the board of directors. They submit an annual report to the Minister of Communication and Media identifying any irregularities or inaccuracies found during their examination and may make recommendations.

RTNC's statutory auditors are subject to the same conditions and incompatibilities applicable to statutory auditors of commercial companies. These restrictions are intended to prevent conflicts of interest and protect the independence of those performing the auditing function.

=== Personnel, assets and financing ===
RTNC personnel consist of two main groups: career civil servants who were transferred from state broadcasting services following the establishment of the OZRT in 1981, and employees recruited or employed directly by the RTNC. The former are governed by public-service laws, while the latter are subject to the Labor Code and applicable collective or contractual agreements. Members of senior management are appointed, assigned, promoted, and removed by the board of directors on the recommendation of the general management. Other staff are appointed and assigned by the general management, which reports these decisions to the board of directors.

Article 5 of the 2009 decree provides that the RTNC's assets consist of the property, rights, and obligations inherited from the OZRT, as well as equipment and other property acquired in the course of its operations. They also include state-owned property and rights related to radio and television broadcasting and subsequent state contributions and reserves. The RTNC's resources include fees for public broadcasting services, revenue from advertising, film production, and other activities related to its mandate, income from assets under its management, state subsidies, donations and bequests, and other miscellaneous or exceptional sources. In addition to its other sources of revenue, RTNC is subject to the taxes, duties, levies, and fees applicable to its operations. Where authorized to collect such charges on behalf of the state, RTNC is required to remit them to the state treasury or the relevant government authority.
