= Tharcisse Kasongo Mwema Yamba-Yamba =

Congolese journalist and politician (1952–2022)

- Born: October 1952; Katanga Province, Belgian Congo
- Died: 12 November 2022 (aged 70); Kinshasa, Democratic Republic of the Congo
- Occupations: Journalist; Politician

Tharcisse Kasongo Mwema Yamba-Yamba (October 1952 – 12 November 2022) was a Congolese journalist and politician.

== Biography ==
=== Early life and career ===
Kasongo grew up in Lubumbashi and began his journalistic career in 1972 in the sports field. He then left the sports department and became a press secretary for the government of Zaire.

In 1992, he left Zaire for France after losing a petition signed to demand freedom of information from President Mobutu Sese Seko. He joined the Radio France Internationale team, reporting on African affairs.

Kasongo returned to the DRC in 2008 to teach at the University of Lubumbashi and joined Kyondo Radio Télévision. On 29 April 2019, he became a government spokesman, assisted by Tina Salama, and directed programs for Radio Okapi. In 2022, he became chairman of the Agence Congolaise de Presse.

=== Death ===
Kasongo died in Kinshasa on 12 November 2022, at the age of 70.

== Works ==
- Enjeux et Publics de la télévision en République Démocratique du Congo (1990-2005) (2007)
