= RTNC Congo Building =

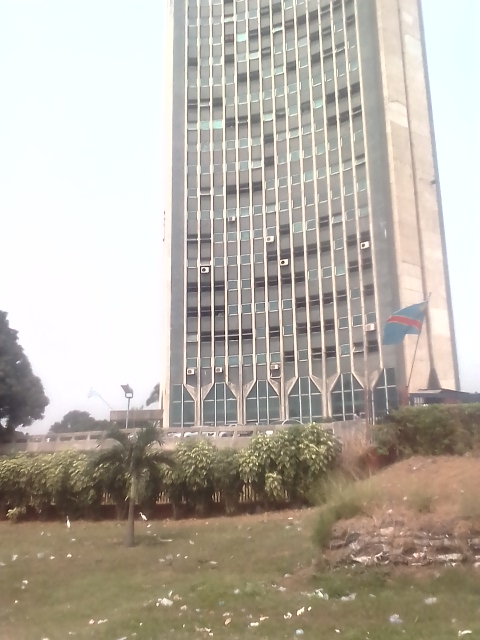

General information
- Status: Completed
- Type: Commercial
- Architectural style: Modernism
- Location: Lingwala, Kinshasa, Democratic Republic of the Congo
- Cost: 450 million FF
- Client: Government of the Democratic Republic of the Congo
- Owner: Radio-Télévision nationale congolaise (RTNC)

Height
- Roof: 259 ft (79 m)

Technical details
- Floor count: 22

Design and construction
- Architect: Oisin O'Brien
- Developer: Government of Zaire
- Main contractor: Thomson-CSF; Setec; Schlumberger; Nord-France

The RTNC Congo Building (formerly the Cité de la Voix du Zaïre) is a 22-story broadcasting and office complex in Lingwala, Kinshasa, Democratic Republic of the Congo. Located on Avenue Pierre Mulele, it serves as the headquarters of Radio-Télévision nationale congolaise (RTNC), the country's national public broadcaster. It was inaugurated in 1976 and was built as a major center for radio, television, and audiovisual production with French technical and financial support.

== History, facilities and layout ==
On 24 November 1976, Zaire inaugurated the Cité de la Voix du Zaïre, which served as RTNC's headquarters. Described as an ultramodern complex, it was designed for radio, television, and audiovisual production. The project was estimated to cost 450 million French francs, of which at least 360 million francs came from French public support. Although the French government was reluctant at the time to extend substantial export credits to Zaire, the project benefited from technical personnel provided through the French Ministry of Cooperation. Financing included loans from the Banque Française du Commerce Extérieur (95 million francs), the Caisse Centrale de Coopération Économique (124 million francs), and the Banque de Paris et des Pays-Bas (46 million francs).

The Cité de la Voix du Zaïre was developed by a consortium comprising Thomson-CSF, setec (a Thomson subsidiary), Schlumberger, and Nord-France. Nord-France carried out the construction, setec handled the civil engineering, and Schlumberger supplied and installed the radio, television, and film equipment. Schlumberger also supplied nineteen color television cameras. In conjunction with the project, Telespace developed a telecommunications satellite network.

The complex comprised a radio center with fourteen studios and ancillary facilities; a television center with four television studios, two film studios, three dubbing studios, and a film-production unit; and a training center with two radio studios, one television studio, one dubbing studio, classrooms, and laboratories. It also included a twenty-story office tower.

Other sources report seventeen radio studios and six or seven television studios.

A 2010 study by Patrick De Favre Bintene reported that only three of the seventeen radio studios remained operational. The Studio-École de la Voix du Zaïre (SEVOZA) was established in 1978 to train radio and television personnel and later became the Institut Congolais de l'Audiovisuel et du Multimédia (ICA). Its facilities included a television studio, control room, and video-editing facilities. The RTNC compound also housed several professional recording studios, including PSPH, Maximedias, SABAB, Zola Tempo, and Souzy Kasseya. Most recording studios adopted digital systems in the 1990s. M'Eko Sound was rebuilt as a digital studio following a 2008 fire and its 2010 rehabilitation, while PSPH and Nouvelle Duplication (popularly known as N'Diaye Studio) retained both analog and digital capabilities.

== See also ==
- Skyscraper design and construction
- List of tallest buildings in Africa
