= EPBL =

EPBL may refer to:

- École Privée Belge de Lubumbashi
- Continental Basketball Association, also known as the Eastern Pennsylvania Basketball League and the Eastern Professional Basketball League
- Empire Professional Baseball League
