= Nyota Radio Television =

Radio and TV station in Lubumbashi, Democratic Republic of Congo

Nyota Radio Télé
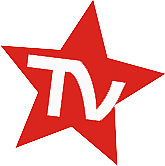
- Nyota logo
- Country: Democratic Republic of Congo
- Broadcast area: Katanga
- Network: Télé et Radio
- Headquarters: Route Kasapa - 2nd Floor Batiment Congo, Commune de Lubumbashi, Katanga

Programming
- Languages: Français, Swahili

Ownership
- Owner: Moïse Katumbi Chapwe

History
- Launched: Summer 2007

Links
- Website: www.nyota.net

Nyota Radio Télévision (commonly referred to as Nyota TV and Nyota FM) is a private commercial TV and radio station based in Lubumbashi, Province of Katanga. The network was founded in the summer of 2007.

== History ==
Its achievement includes a homemade broadcasting truck, from which two of the 2008 CAF Champions League games were broadcast from and the live feed signal was sent via satellite for the live broadcasting of the games across Africa and the rest of the world on many other channels. The station continues to broadcast events that are shown in the capital city of kinshasa via satellite.

== Programming ==
=== News ===
The main TV news edition broadcast every day at 7:00PM local time is the most watched program of the network. In the evening alone, Nyota TV broadcasts four different editions of the news starting at 6:00PM with Tarifa Ya Habari (the edition in Swahili), at 7:00PM the main edition in French, at 9:00PM an updated version of the main edition without a host and the last edition comes at 11:00PM, all times are local. As of November 8, 2008 the 9:00PM edition of the news can be seen daily on the internet by visiting the network's website.

=== Sport ===
The network broadcasts several programs relating to sports during the week as well as on week-ends. The network's main sport show is Sport Star which is a daily sport news show with a special edition on Mondays called Tempo Sport covering all the sporting events from the past week-end as well as other sport related topics. Other sports shows produced by the network are Sportissimo(radio), Timu Kubwa (show in Swahili), Le Sportif parle, All sports, Plein foot (concentrated on soccer), Clein d'oeil(radio).

=== Education ===
Throughout the week, the network provides educational programs. Such programs are:

- Plateau de femme = A women show that welcomes a guest weekly and deals with matter affecting women
- Plateau du droit = This a show that deals within the realm of the Congolese law. Guests are lawyers, judges etc.
- Fleau du Siecle = the subject matter is how diseases can be handled
- Kukinga Jamaa = Hosted in Swahili, here issues relating to marriage are handled
- Sante++ = A creative show in the form of presented news where qualified practitioners intervene on recent medical technology, diseases and their cure
- Pour un marriage heureux = Talk show with a live audience, dealing with issues that may rise in a relationship and how to take care of it
