= Capture of Lubumbashi =

Capture of Lumbumbashi

- Part of the First Congo War
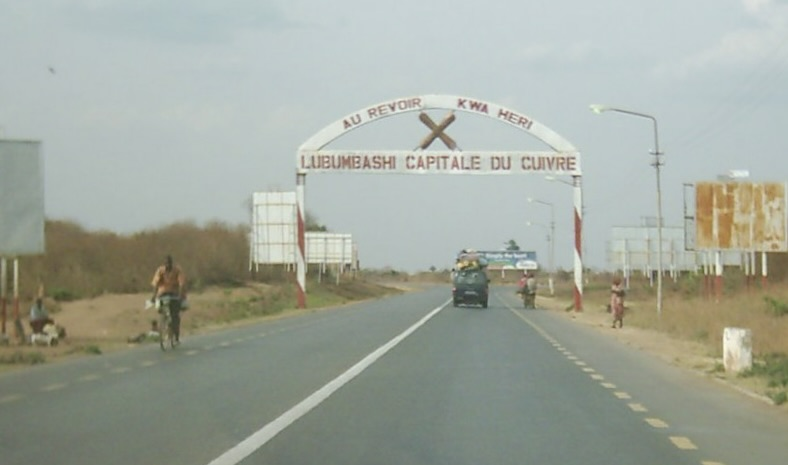
- Entrance to Lubumbashi, 2003
Date	April 9, 1997
Location	Lubumbashi, Zaïre 11°41′16.43″S 27°29′56.04″E
Result	Victory of AFDL and allies

Belligerents
Zaire	(Democratic Republic of the Congo) AFDL; Rwanda; Zambia

Commanders and leaders
Peneloa Molan; Nsimba Kinene; Nsau Nzuzi	Ntambo Mutchaïl; Sylvain Mbumba

Units involved
21st Brigade of the Special Presidential Division; Zairian Civil Guard	People's Liberation Army of Congo: Katangese Tigers; Rwandan Patriotic Army; Zambian Defence Force

The capture of Lubumbashi took place in April 1997, during the First Congo War in southern Zaire (now the Democratic Republic of Congo). The rebels of the Alliance des forces démocratiques pour la libération du Congo (AFDL) took the city of Lubumbashi from the Zairean armed forces (FAZ) loyal to President Mobutu Sese Seko.

The city, capital of the mining province of Katanga, was targeted by rebels following their conquest of eastern Zaire. Supported by their Rwandan allies, AFDL troops were joined by Katangese exiles from Angola. Airlifted to Zambia, the rebels overran the city's defenses and put the demoralized FAZ to flight. The capture of the city strengthened the legitimacy of Laurent-Désiré Kabila, leader of the AFDL, in his victorious advance until the capture of Kinshasa on May 17, 1997.

== Context ==
Zaire in early April 1997. The FAZ had just left Kamina on March 31, 1997.

In the 1990s, the dictatorship of Marshal Mobutu, established in the Democratic Republic of Congo in 1965, was running out of steam. The oligarchic system had ruined the country, and his Western allies had stopped supporting him. Meanwhile, the Hutu regime in Rwanda collapsed in the face of an offensive by Paul Kagame's Rwandan Patriotic Front. The Interahamwe extremists, who had committed genocide against the Tutsis, took refuge in Zaire. Rwanda decided to eliminate this threat to its borders and allied itself with various Congolese rebels opposed to Mobutu, grouped around Laurent-Désiré Kabila.

In October 1996, following incidents in Kivu with the Rwandan-speaking Banyamulenge ethnic group, Zaire was attacked by rebels belonging to the Rwandan-backed AFDL. The rebels and the Rwandan Patriotic Army drove the FAZ loyal to Mobutu out of eastern Zaire. An attempted loyalist counter-attack at Kisangani failed in March 1997. Unmotivated government soldiers were unable to halt the rebel advance.

Still under FAZ control in April 1997, Lubumbashi was the country's second-largest city and the capital of the province of Katanga, then known as Shaba. The city is rich in copper and cobalt mines and is the AFDL's last strategic objective before the capital Kinshasa.

Shaba was also the home region of Laurent-Désiré Kabila. Finally, the province seceded in 1960 to form the state of Katanga. Independence was lost in 1963, but the province retained an autonomist tradition in the face of the centralist Mobutu regime.

== The forces at work ==
In 1990, Lubumbashi was home to the FAZ's 21st “Leopard” infantry brigade, some 800 men under the command of Colonel Nsau Nzuzi. It comprises two infantry battalions and a support battalion with limited combat capabilities. Heavy 120 mm mortars were deployed in the town but played no part in the fighting. Units of the Zairian Civil Guard and the Presidential Special Division (DSP) joined the city's defense, the latter under the command of Colonel Nsimba Kinene.

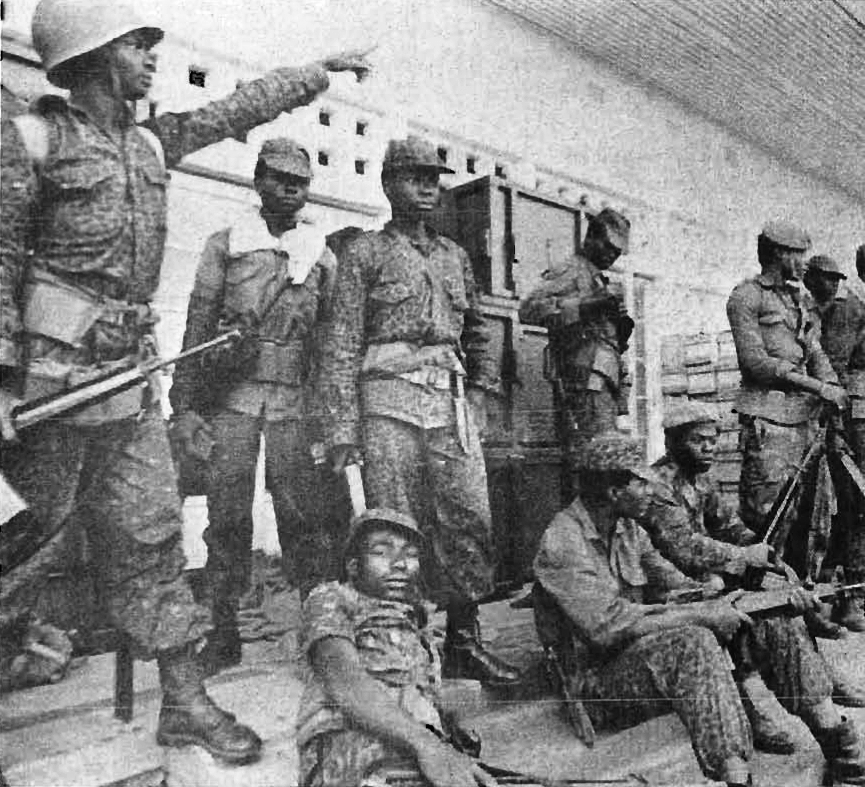
Soldiers of the 21st Brigade of the FAZ in April 1977, twenty years before the battle.

The Armée populaire de libération du Congo, the armed forces of the AFDL, was supported by fighters from the Rwandan Patriotic Army. The rebels are also joined by the Tigres Katangais, a force formed by exiles under the command of Sylvain Mbumba. They flew to Ndola in Zambia and pincered Lubumbashi from the west, transported by Zambian army trucks. According to the South African newspaper The Sunday Independent, 1,000 Zambian soldiers also took part in the fighting. Rebel colonel Ntambo Mutchaïl acknowledged the use of child soldiers (kadogos). The pro-Kabila forces' heavy weaponry was limited to rocket launchers and mortars.

== Capture of the city ==
The anti-Zairian forces' various axes of progression.

Fewer than 300 rebels are thought to have taken part in the attack on the town on April 9, from three different directions. Rather than attacking from Likasi (to the northwest) or Kasenga (to the northeast), the main AFDL attack came from Kipushi on the Zambian border. The FAZ put up very little resistance to the rebel assault. The commander of the military region, General Peneloa Molanda, was the first to flee. The DSP and Civil Guard soldiers were the only ones to resist. Soldiers from the 21st Brigade join the rebels, pointing out the positions of the Presidential Guard's mortars and multiple rocket launchers. Encircled at the airport, 10 km from the town center, the DSP soldiers held out until the evening of April 10, although a rebellion broke out after the unit's officers tried to escape. Soldiers from Mobutu's Ngbandi ethnic group were evacuated at the last minute by plane.

The town was looted by Mobutu's routed soldiers, as well as by its inhabitants, but civilian casualties were low. The rebels received an enthusiastic welcome from the population. Security was provided by the local Uferi party, close to the Katangese Tiger fighters.

== Aftermath ==
The city became the de facto capital of the rebels. Zairian symbols were quickly removed from the city and the historic flag of the Republic of Congo was flown on public buildings, while many of the city's young people joined the rebel troops. The rest of the province was easily liberated by the rebels.

The historic flag of Congo-Léopoldville, taken up again in the city rallied to the rebels.

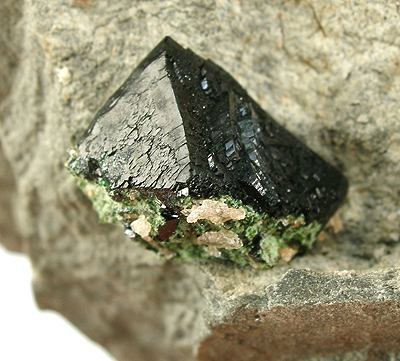
Libethenite extracted from a mine in Lubumbashi.

The conquest of Lubumbashi, as well as that of the diamond-rich town of Mbujimayi (Kasaï-Oriental), headquarters of the Bakwanga mining company, on April 5, 1997, bolstered the AFDL's coffers. On April 16, 1997, the AFDL signed a contract with America Mineral Fields, which manages the town's mines. On April 18, 1997, the head of De Beers' Kinshasa office left to meet Laurent-Désiré Kabila. Representatives of Goldman Sachs and First Bank of Boston also visited the rebel leader.

For the international community, Kabila has become a key element in the situation in Zaire. In early May, he received an American delegation led by Cynthia McKinney, a member of the US House of Representatives.

On May 16, a month after the capture of Lubumbashi, Mobutu fled from his palace in Kinshasa. The next day, the AFDL entered the city and Kabila announced from Lubumbashi that he was becoming President of the Democratic Republic of Congo.

== See also ==
- Shaba I
- Shaba II
- Lubumbashi
- Mobutu Sese Seko

== Bibliography ==
- Kennes, Erik (1998). La guerre du Congo (PDF). Archived from the original (PDF) on 2024-12-30.
- Prunier, Gérard (2009). Africa's world war. Congo, the Rwandan genocide, and the making of a continental catastrophe. Oxford University Press. ISBN 978-0-19-537420-9.
- Reyntjens, Filip (2009). The Great African War Congo and Regional Geopolitics, 1996–2006. Cambridge: Cambridge University Press. ISBN 978-0-521-11128-7.
- Stearns, Jason (2012). Dancing in the Glory of Monsters: The Collapse of the Congo and the Great War of Africa. PublicAffairs. ISBN 978-1-61039-107-8.
- Thom, William G. (1999). "Congo-Zaire's 1996-97 Civil War in the Context of Evolving Patterns of Military Conflict in Africa in the Era of Independence". Journal of Conflict Studies. 19 (2). ISSN 1715-5673.
- Dia Mwembu, Donatien Dibwe (2018). Histoire picturale de Laurent-Désiré Kabila (1997-2001) (1 ed.). Artl@s Bulletin.
- Le Pape, Marc (2009). De Bukavu à Mbandaka: récits de fuite 1996-1997. Images, mémoires et savoirs: une histoire en partage avec Bogumil Koss Jewsiewicki, Karthala. Isidore Ndaywel è Nziem et Elisabeth Mudimbe-Boyi, Images, mémoires et savoirs: une histoire en partage avec Bogumil Koss Jewsiewicki, Karthala. ISBN 978-2-8111-0208-1.
