= Patrick Muyaya Katembwe =

Congolese politician (born 1982)

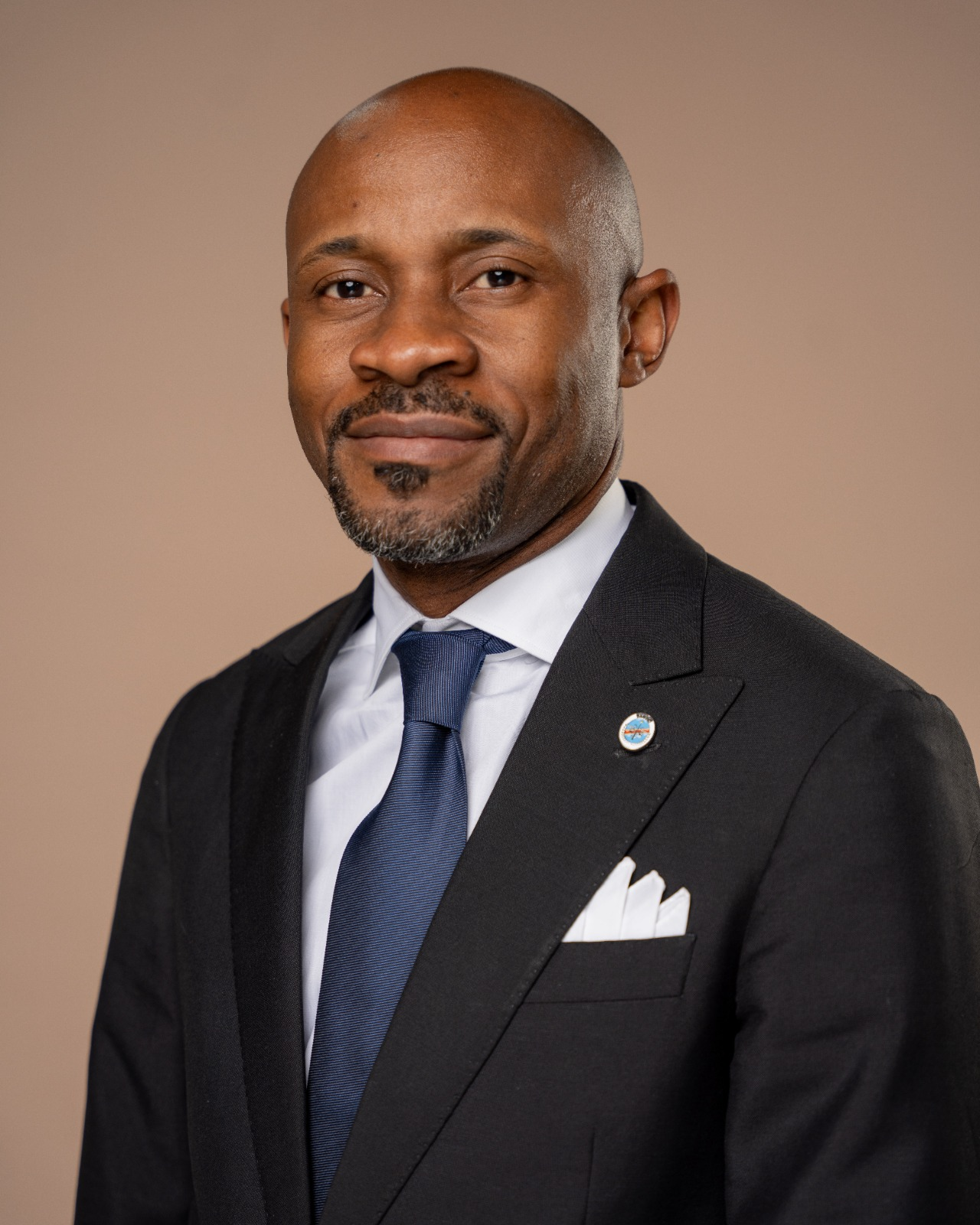
- Muyaya in 2023

Minister of Communication and Media
- Incumbent
- Assumed office 12 April 2021
- President: Félix Tshisekedi
- Prime Minister: Judith Suminwa
- Preceded by: David Jolino Diwampovesa Makelele
- Constituency: Funa District

National Deputy

Personal details
- Born: Patrick Muyaya Katembwe; 10 July 1982 (age 44) Bandalungwa, Kinshasa, Zaire (modern-day Democratic Republic of the Congo)
- Party: Parti Lumumbiste Unifié
- Education: Université des Sciences de l'Information et de la Communication (UNISIC)

Patrick Muyaya Katembwe (born 10 July 1982) is a Congolese politician, journalist, and government official currently serving as Minister of Communication and Media and spokesperson of the Government of the Democratic Republic of the Congo. He has served as a member of the National Assembly since 2011. A graduate in political journalism from the Institut Facultaire des Sciences de l'Information et de la Communication (IFASIC, now the Université des Sciences de l'Information et de la Communication, UNISIC), he began his career in the media sector as editor-in-chief and later news director at Congo Education Broadcasting System (CEBS), an educational television channel, eventually becoming its chairman of the board.

He entered politics in the early 2000s, first working within the transitional parliament and later serving as political adviser to the Governor of Kongo Central, Jacques Mbadu, before joining the cabinets of Prime Ministers Antoine Gizenga and Adolphe Muzito, where he directed communication.

Elected as national deputy for Kinshasa's Funa District in 2011 under the banner of the Parti Lumumbiste Unifié (PALU), Muyaya established himself as one of the younger figures in Congolese politics, gaining recognition as deputy rapporteur of the National Assembly's Foreign Relations Commission and as president of the Congolese Network of Young Parliamentarians in 2016. He was re-elected to parliament in 2018 and again in 2023, while also winning a provincial deputy seat for Bandalungwa. Alongside his legislative role, he has remained active in civic and pro-democracy associations, with particular engagement in youth, peace, and democracy initiatives, including serving as an international observer during the 2013 Malian presidential election.

Appointed Minister of Communication and Media in April 2021 in the government of Jean-Michel Sama Lukonde, he was reappointed to the same post in May 2024 under Prime Minister Judith Suminwa, following the re-election of President Félix Tshisekedi.

== Early life and education ==
Patrick Muyaya was born 10 July 1982 in Kinshasa. He grew up in the commune of Bandalungwa and studied communications at the University of Kinshasa. He received his degree in journalism in 2009. Muyaya later obtained a certificate in democratic management in fragile states through the International Republican Institute's "Rising Stars" program in 2014.

== Political career ==
Muyaya began his career in the media sector in the early 2000s as editor-in-chief and later news director at Congo Education Broadcasting System (CEBS), an educational television channel, eventually becoming its chairman of the board.

He began his political career in 2005 when he joined the staff of Pius Isoyongo Lofete, second rapporteur for the transitional national assembly. He later became Lofete's political advisor, serving in that post until 2006. In 2007, he became a communications advisor for the Cabinet of Prime Minister Antoine Gizenga.

One year later, he became principal advisor in charge of communications and the press for the Prime Minister's office under Adolphe Muzito, occupying that post until 2011.

=== Member of Parliament ===
In the 2011 Democratic Republic of the Congo general election Muyaya was elected a member of parliament from the Kinshasa II (Funa) district. He was elected on the party list of the Unified Lumumbist Party.

Muyaya was re-elected in the 2018 Democratic Republic of the Congo general election.

=== Government spokesman ===
In April 2021 he was appointed as government spokesman in the new DRC government.

=== Other political activities ===
He served as first secretary of the office of the rapporteur for the provisional bureau of the National Assembly from February to April 2012, and later served as assistant rapporteur for the Foreign Relations commission of the National Assembly.

Since July 2016, he is also the leader of the Network of Young Parliamentarians of the Democratic Republic of Congo.

In July 2016, Muyaya was invited to attend the 2016 Democratic National Convention in Philadelphia as a guest of the National Democratic Institute for International Affairs

Muyaya worked with the United States Department of State in January 2015 on a pre-election mediation mission.

Muyaya served as an election observer for the 2013 presidential election in Mali with the support of the International Republican Institute.

== Personal life ==
Muyaya is married to Benoîte Muzito Muyaya and has three children.
