= École Privée Belge de Lubumbashi =

International Belgian school in Democratic Republic of the Congo

Coordinates: 11.6491°S 27.4668°E

École Privée Belge de Lubumbashi (EPBL) is an international Belgian school in Lubumbashi, Democratic Republic of the Congo.

== Location ==
It is situated in Avenue Kashobwe, 13, not far from the Kipopo lake.

== History ==
The Belgian school was established in 1971. It follows the curriculum of the Wallonia-Brussels Federation.
