= Ministry of Communication and Media =

Government ministry of the Democratic Republic of the Congo

- Ministère de la Communication et des Médias
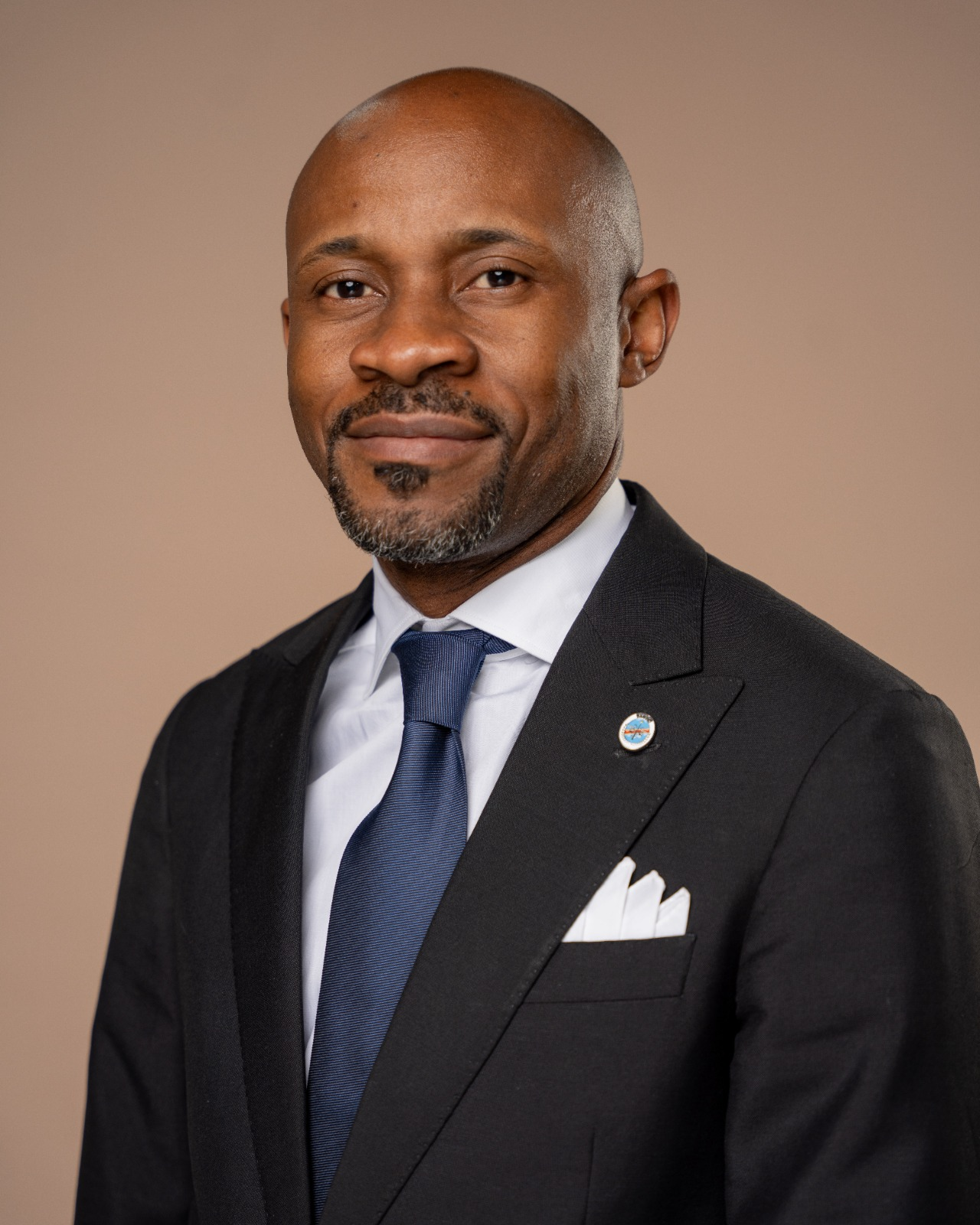
- Patrick Muyaya Katembwe

Agency overview
- Formed: 1960 (reorganized in 2008)
- Jurisdiction: Government of the Democratic Republic of the Congo
- Headquarters: Kinshasa, Democratic Republic of the Congo
- Minister responsible: Patrick Muyaya Katembwe
- Website: https://communication.gouv.cd/

The Ministry of Communication and Media (French: Ministère de la Communication et des Médias) is a government ministry of the Democratic Republic of the Congo responsible for media policy, press and broadcasting regulation, and enforcement of communications laws. It is headquartered in Kinshasa and oversees policies affecting the media, audiovisual standards, telecommunications framework, and the government-media relations.

The Ministry is headed by the Minister of Communication and Media, who also serves as the government's official spokesperson. Patrick Muyaya Katembwe has held the position since April 2021 and was reappointed in May 2024 under the government of Prime Minister Judith Suminwa following the re-election of President Félix Tshisekedi in the December 2023 presidential elections.

== Functions and responsibilities ==
The Ministry derives its authority from multiple legal instruments, including the Constitution of the Democratic Republic of the Congo, the Law No. 96-002 of 22 June 1996 on the modalities of exercising press freedom, and the Framework Law No. 013/2002 of 16 October 2002 on telecommunications. Its structure and attributions are also defined in Ordinance No. 08/074 of 24 December 2008, which outlines the responsibilities of each ministry, and Ordinance No. 10/025 of 19 February 2010, which addresses government appointments. The Ministry also works closely with the Conseil Supérieur de l'Audiovisuel et de la Communication (CSAC), an independent authority responsible for overseeing audiovisual media, as established by Organic Law No. 11/001 of 10 January 2011.

Ministerial Decree No. 035/2011 of 14 June 2011 serves as one of its chief regulatory instruments, which modified and expanded earlier decrees enforcing the 1996 press law. This decree introduced new obligations and procedures for private and public broadcasters, including:

- The establishment of a Register of prior declarations for the operation of radio and television stations.
- The requirement that all advertising messages receive prior approval from competent public authorities.
- The obligation for audiovisual media companies to obtain official receipts (récépissés) confirming their compliance with legal provisions.

=== Cahier des Charges ===
Attached to the 2011 ministerial decree, the Cahier des Charges (terms of reference) serves as a detailed regulatory guide that outlines the responsibilities of the nation's audiovisual media, addressing areas such as programming, copyright protection, advertising, and the duties of public and private broadcasters. In terms of programming and broadcasting, media operators are required to appoint a Director of Programs with professional expertise in communication, and all content must strike a balance between information, education, and entertainment while avoiding broadcasts that contravene the law, public order, morality, or national security. Stations are also obliged to preserve recordings of their broadcasts for at least thirty days, and restrictions are imposed on political propaganda outside official electoral periods as well as on content harmful to minors, with explicit rules regarding the scheduling of films not suitable for children.

In copyright and co-production, the Ministry mandates that broadcasters actively promote Congolese audiovisual productions and encourage local creativity. The rebroadcast of foreign programming requires prior authorization, particularly in relation to current affairs, while copyright disputes are handled by national courts in collaboration with SOCODA (Société congolaise des droits d'auteur et des droits voisins), the cooperative agency tasked with administering royalties for authors, composers, performers, and other rights holders throughout the country. Similarly, advertising activities are subject to strict oversight: only accredited audiovisual entities may air commercial advertisements, contracts must govern the allocation of slots, rates, and duration, and clandestine or free advertising is prohibited, with all advertising content subject to prior approval by competent authorities.

=== Audiovisual, community and faith-based media ===
Public audiovisual media are entrusted with the mission of conveying the government's national communication policy while maintaining "impartiality, honesty, and objectivity". They are charged with providing civic education, promoting knowledge of the Constitution, strengthening national unity, guaranteeing pluralism of opinion and equal access for all social groups, and employing national languages to reach the widest possible audience. Public sector programming is required to maintain neutrality and balance in its coverage of political and social issues. Conversely, private broadcasters are bound by stricter requirements designed to ensure local relevance: at least 50 percent of their content must be locally produced, and they are obliged to keep comprehensive programming logs available for regulatory inspection. They may rebroadcast public-sector content with prior notification to the authorities, but are strictly prohibited from spreading misinformation, alarmist narratives, or hate-inciting information and are expected to contribute to a culture of peace.

Community and religious broadcasters operate under rules designed to suit their particular purposes. Their programming is required to uphold the social or spiritual goals outlined in their statutes, and while they are allowed to promote their own initiatives, they are barred from carrying commercial advertising. These broadcasters are also expected to demonstrate tolerance and respect for other religious and community perspectives, avoiding sectarian exclusivity. The operation of any broadcasting station is contingent upon obtaining a récépissé from the Ministry of Communication and Media, which certifies compliance with statutory requirements. Failure to adhere to the provisions of the Cahier des Charges subjects operators to legal sanctions.
