= Lubumbashi =

Second-largest city in the Democratic Republic of the Congo

Lubumbashi: Mji wa Lubumbashi/Jiji la Lubumbashi (Congo Swahili); Mùsoko wa Lubumbashi (Luba-Katanga)
- Provincial capital and city
- Ville de Lubumbashi
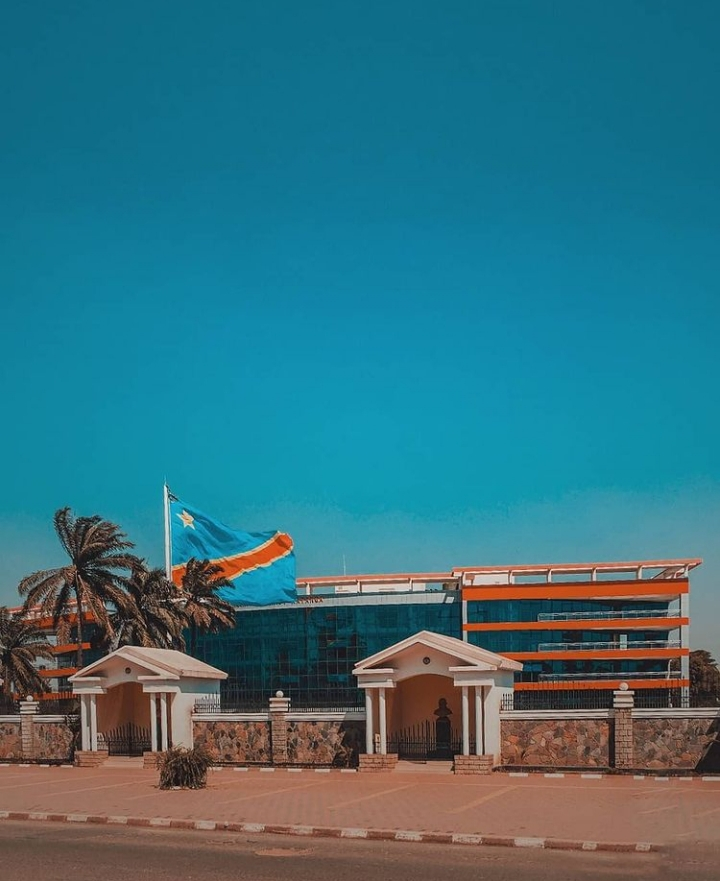
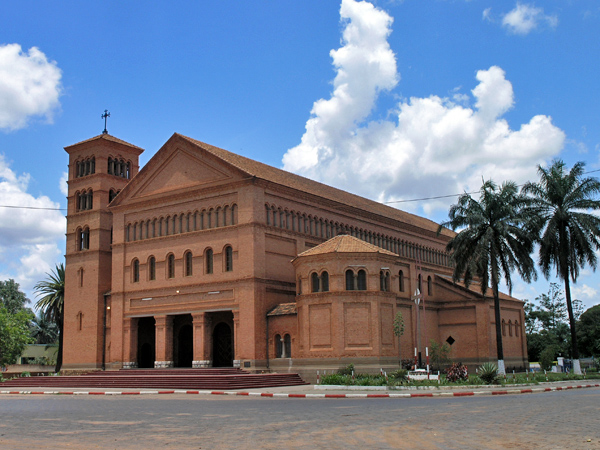
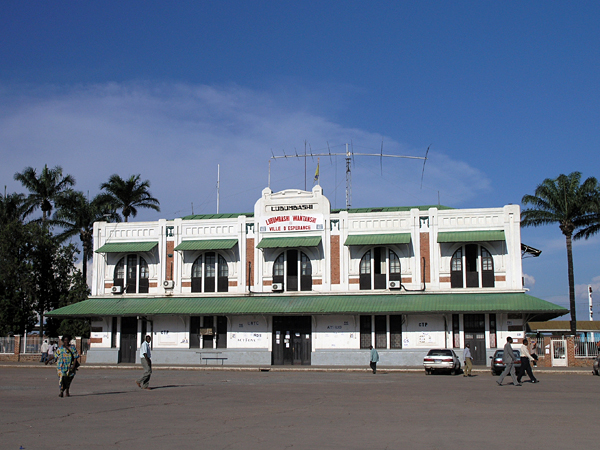
- Gouvernorat of Haut-Katanga Saints Peter and Paul Cathedral Central Station

- Flag Seal
- Nickname: L'shi – Lubum
- Location in the Democratic Republic of the Congo Lubumbashi (Africa)
- Coordinates: 11°39′51″S 27°28′58″E
- Country: Democratic Republic of the Congo
- Province: Haut-Katanga
- Founded: 1910

Government
  - Mayor: Patrick Kafwimbi (interim)

Area
  - Land: 747 km^{2} (288 sq mi)
  - Urban: 747 km^{2} (288 sq mi)
- Elevation: 1,208 m (3,963 ft)

Population (2021)
  - Urban: 2,584,000 (2nd)
  - Urban density: 3,460/km^{2} (8,960/sq mi)
  - Ethnicities: Balamba • Baluba • Ababemba • Balunda other Bantu peoples
- Time zone: UTC+02:00 (Central Africa Time)
- Climate: Cwa
- Website: villedelubumbashi.gouv.cd

Lubumbashi (UK: /ˌluːbʊmˈbæʃi/ LOO-buum-BASH-ee, US: /ˌluːbuːmˈbɑːʃi/ LOO-boom-BAH-shee), formerly Élisabethville (French: [elizabɛtvil]; Dutch: Elisabethstad [eːˈlisaːbɛtstɑt]), is the second-largest city in the Democratic Republic of the Congo, located in the southeasternmost part of the country, near the border with Zambia. The capital and principal city of the Haut-Katanga Province, Lubumbashi is the center of mining in the region, acting as a hub for many of the country's largest mining companies. No definite population figures are available, but the population of the city's urban area is estimated to be around 2,584,000 in 2021.

== History ==
=== Élisabethville under Belgian rule ===
The Belgian government established the modern-day government in the city of Élisabethville (sometimes Elizabethville, both in French, or Elisabethstad in Dutch) in 1910, named in honour of Queen Elisabeth, consort to King Albert I of the Belgians. By that time, the government had taken over the colony from King Leopold II, and renamed it as the Belgian Congo. This site was chosen by Vice-Governor-General Emile Wangermée because of its proximity to the copper mine of Etoile du Congo and the copper ore smelting oven installed by Union Minière du Haut Katanga on the nearby Lubumbashi River.

The Comité Spécial du Katanga (CSK), a semi-private concessionary company set up in 1900, had its headquarters in Élisabethville throughout the colonial era. It enjoyed major privileges, mainly in terms of land and mining concessions, in the Katanga province.

The city prospered with the development of a regional copper mining industry. Huge investments in the 1920s, both in the mining industry and in transport infrastructure (railline Elisabethville-Port Francqui and Elisabethville-Dilolo), developed the Katanga province into one of the world's major copper ore producers. The population of the city grew apace from approx. 30,000 in 1930, to 50,000 in 1943 and 180,000 in 1957. It was the second city of the Belgian Congo, after Léopoldville.

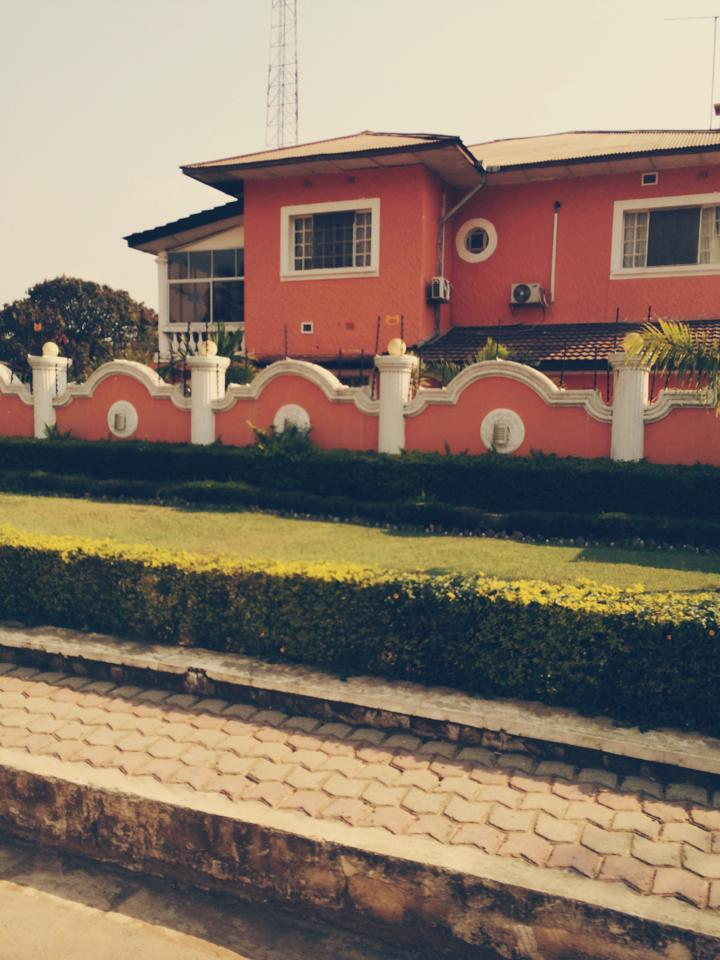
The Belgian Quarter in Lubumbashi

As was customary with European colonies, the city centre of Élisabethville was reserved for the minority white (European) population. This consisted mainly of Belgian nationals, but the city also attracted important British and Italian communities, as well as Jewish Greeks. Congolese were allowed in the white city only during the day, except for the house servants ("boys") who often lived in shanty dwellings ("boyeries") located in the backyards of the European city houses.

Many men in the black population were labour immigrants from neighbouring regions in the Belgian Congo (Northern Katanga, Maniema, Kasaï), from Belgian Rwanda and Burundi, and from British Northern Rhodesia (present-day Zambia). The black population lived initially in a so-called cité indigène called Quartier Albert (now Kamalondo), south of the city centre and separated from the white city by a 700-metres-wide neutral zone. With population growth, new indigenous quarters were created. These still form the main suburbs of present-day Lubumbashi: Kenia, Katuba, and Ruashi. The work and businesses related to the mines made Élisabethville the most prosperous region of the Congo during the last decade of Belgian rule. In 1954, there were 8,000 black homeowners in the city while thousands more were skilled workers. It was estimated that black Africans living in Élisabethville had a higher standard of living than anywhere else on the continent at that time.

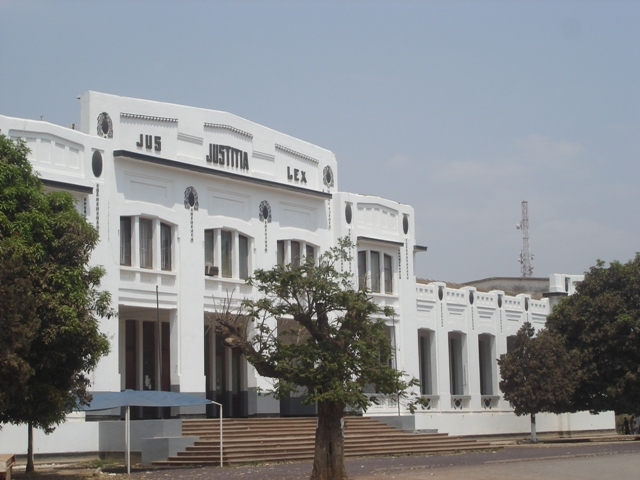
Lubumbashi Palace of Justice, c. 1920s

Miners in Élisabethville conducted a strike in December 1941 to protest the increasingly severe forced-labour regime that the Belgians imposed on the population because of the "war efforts". A rally in the Union Minière football stadium got out of hand. Police opened fire and numerous protesters were killed. In early 1944, the city was again in the grip of severe tensions and fear of violent protests, following a mutiny of the Force Publique (army) in Luluabourg.

Starting in 1933, the Belgian colonial authorities experimented with a limited form of self-governance by establishing the cité indigène of Élisabethville as a so-called centre extra-coutumier (a centre not subject to customary law). It was administered by an indigenous council and presided over by an indigenous chief. But due to constant interference from the Belgian authorities, the experiment soon proved a failure. The first indigenous chief – Albert Kabongo – appointed in 1937, was dismissed in 1943 and not replaced.

In 1957, Élisabethville was established as a fully autonomous city; it held the first free municipal elections in which the Congolese could vote. The people of Élisabethville gave a vast majority to the nationalist Alliance des Bakongo, which demanded immediate independence from Belgium.

Élisabethville functioned as the administrative capital of the Katanga province. It was also an important commercial and industrial centre, and a centre of education and health services. The Benedictine Order and missionary Order of Salesians offered a wide range of educational facilities to Europeans and Congolese alike, including vocational training (Kafubu). The Belgians established the University of Élisabethville in 1954–1955 (now the University of Lubumbashi).

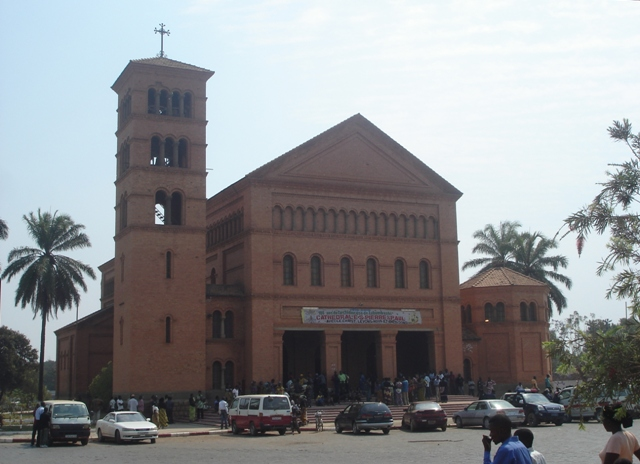
Saints Peter and Paul Cathedral

=== Lubumbashi from 1960 ===
Élisabethville served as the capital and centre of the secessionist independent state of Katanga during the 1960–1963 Congolese civil war. Moise Tshombe proclaimed Katangan independence in July 1960. Congolese leaders arrested him and charged him with treason in April 1961; however, he agreed to dismiss his foreign advisers and military forces in exchange for his release. Tshombe returned to Élisabethville but repudiated these assurances and began to fight anew. United Nations troops opposed Katangan forces and took control of the city in December 1961 under a strong mandate. Roger Trinquier, well known for his published works on counter-insurgency warfare, served as a French military advisor to President Tshombe until international pressure, led by Belgium, caused his recall to France.

Mobutu Sese Seko ultimately assumed power of the Congo, which he renamed Zaïre. He renamed Élisabethville to "Lubumbashi" in 1966 and in 1972 renamed Katanga to "Shaba."

The Alliance of Democratic Forces for the Liberation of Congo rebels captured Lubumbashi in April 1997. Rebel leader Laurent-Désiré Kabila spoke from Lubumbashi to declare himself president of the Democratic Republic of the Congo on 17 May 1997 after Mobutu Sese Seko fled Kinshasa.

When Laurent-Désiré Kabila decided to appoint a transitional parliament, in 1999, he decided to install the Parliament in Lubumbashi, in order to consolidate the fragile unity of the country. The parliament was installed in the building of the National Assembly of secessionist Katanga (the former city theatre), which had its capital in this city as well, in the 1960s. Lubumbashi was therefore the Legislative capital of the Democratic Republic of the Congo from 1999 to 2003, when all the country's central institutions were brought back to Kinshasa.

On 7 September 2010 a large prison break happened in Lubumbashi after gunmen attacked a prison on the outskirts of the city. 960 prisoners managed to escape, including the Mai-Mai leader Gédéon Kyungu Mutanga. On 23 March 2013 a militia group of 100 fighters attacked Lubumbashi and seized a United Nations compound, which was surrounded by Congolese soldiers and members of the president's Republican Guard.

== Geography ==
Lubumbashi lies at around 1,208 m (3,963 ft) above sea level. The high altitude serves to cool the climate, which would otherwise be very hot. The Kafue River rises along the Zambian border near the city and meanders through north-central Zambia to the Zambezi River, cutting a long, deep panhandle into the country.

=== Climate ===
Lubumbashi has a dry-winter humid subtropical climate (Cwa, according to the Köppen climate classification), with warm rainy summers and pleasant, dry winters, with most rainfall occurring during summer and early autumn. Annual average rainfall is 1,238 mm (48.75 inches).

Climate data for Lubumbashi
| Month | Jan | Feb | Mar | Apr | May | Jun | Jul | Aug | Sep | Oct | Nov | Dec | Year |
|---|---|---|---|---|---|---|---|---|---|---|---|---|---|
| Mean daily maximum °C (°F) | 26 (79) | 26 (79) | 26 (79) | 27 (81) | 26 (79) | 25 (77) | 25 (77) | 27 (81) | 30 (86) | 31 (88) | 28 (82) | 26 (79) | 27 (81) |
| Daily mean °C (°F) | 21 (70) | 21 (70) | 21 (70) | 20.5 (68.9) | 18 (64) | 16.5 (61.7) | 16.5 (61.7) | 18 (64) | 21 (70) | 23 (73) | 22 (72) | 21 (70) | 20.0 (67.9) |
| Mean daily minimum °C (°F) | 16 (61) | 16 (61) | 16 (61) | 14 (57) | 10 (50) | 8 (46) | 8 (46) | 9 (48) | 12 (54) | 15 (59) | 16 (61) | 16 (61) | 13 (55) |
| Average rainfall mm (inches) | 253 (10.0) | 257 (10.1) | 202 (8.0) | 60 (2.4) | 4 (0.2) | 1 (0.0) | 0 (0) | 0 (0) | 4 (0.2) | 37 (1.5) | 163 (6.4) | 257 (10.1) | 1,238 (48.9) |
| Average rainy days | 24 | 23 | 21 | 9 | 2 | 0 | 0 | 0 | 1 | 5 | 17 | 24 | 126 |
Source: https://www.weather2travel.com/climate-guides/congo-kinshasa/lubumbashi.php

Maximum UV index for Lubumbashi
| Month | Jan | Feb | Mar | Apr | May | Jun | Jul | Aug | Sep | Oct | Nov | Dec | Year |
|---|---|---|---|---|---|---|---|---|---|---|---|---|---|
| Average Ultraviolet index | 11+ | 11+ | 11+ | 11+ | 10 | 9 | 9 | 11 | 11+ | 11+ | 11+ | 11+ | 10.8 |
Source: weather2travel.com

== Demographics ==
=== Languages ===
French is the official language, but the main spoken lingua franca in Lubumbashi is Kiswahili. The dialect of Kiswahili spoken all down the east side of Congo (including the provinces of North Kivu, South Kivu, Maniema, Katanga and Oriental, Western Kasai and Eastern Kasai) and almost all the way across to the Katangan border with Angola is called Kingwana. As many people have moved into Lubumbashi for employment from rural areas, they have brought many other local languages including Kiluba, Chokwe, Bemba, and Kisanga. Kiswahili has been the chief language shared by most people.

=== Religion ===
Religious places of worship in Lubumbashi are predominantly Christian: Roman Catholic Archdiocese of Lubumbashi (Catholic Church), Kimbanguist Church, Baptist Community of Congo (Baptist World Alliance), Baptist Community of the Congo River (Baptist World Alliance), Assemblies of God, Province of the Anglican Church of the Congo (Anglican Communion), Presbyterian Community in Congo (World Communion of Reformed Churches). On April 5, 2020, the Church of Jesus Christ of Latter-day Saints announced plans to construct a temple in Lubumbashi, its second temple in the country. There are also Muslim mosques.

== Economy ==
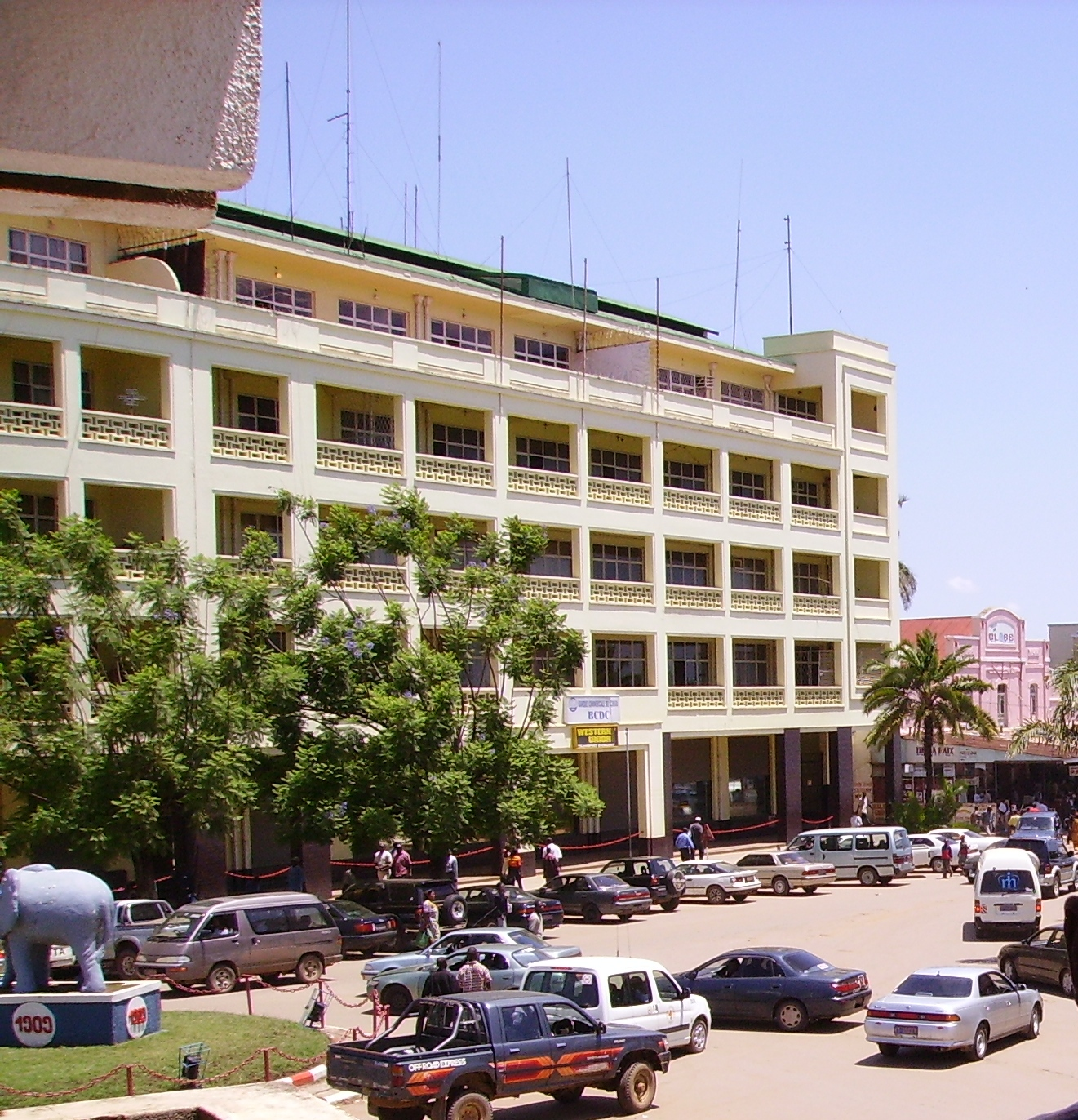
Commercial Bank of Congo

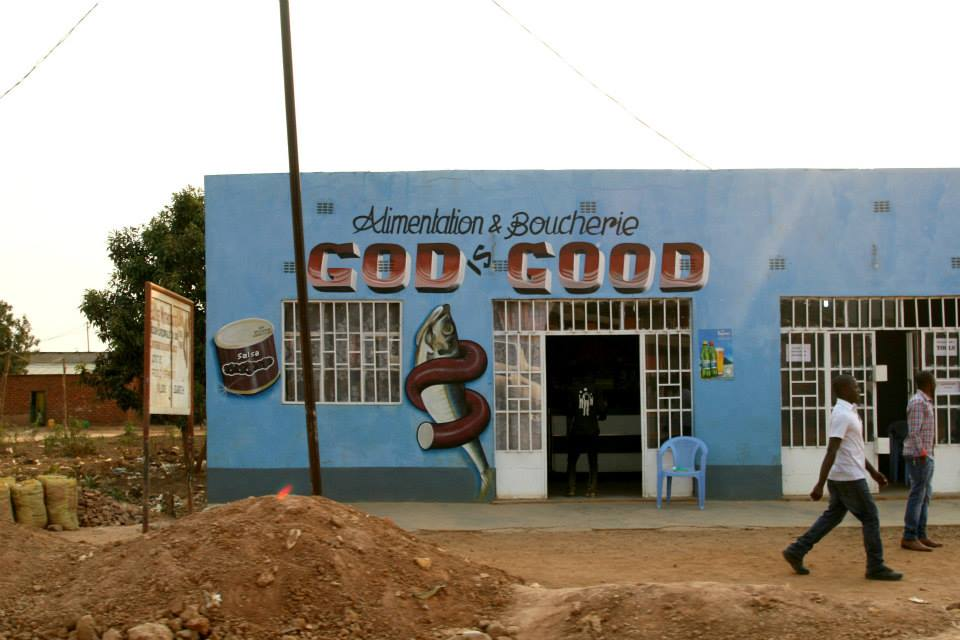
Storefronts in Lubumbashi

Lubumbashi serves as an important commercial, business, and national industrial centre. Manufactures include textiles, food products and beverages, printing, bricks, and copper smelting. The city is home to the Simba brewery, producing the famous Tembo beer.

The city hosts the headquarters of one of the country's largest banks, Trust Merchant Bank. The area also has a daily newspaper.

=== Mining ===
Lubumbashi, the mining capital of the Democratic Republic of the Congo, is a base for many of the country's biggest mining companies. The Democratic Republic of Congo produces "more than 3 percent of the world's copper and half its cobalt, most of which comes from Katanga."

== Transport ==
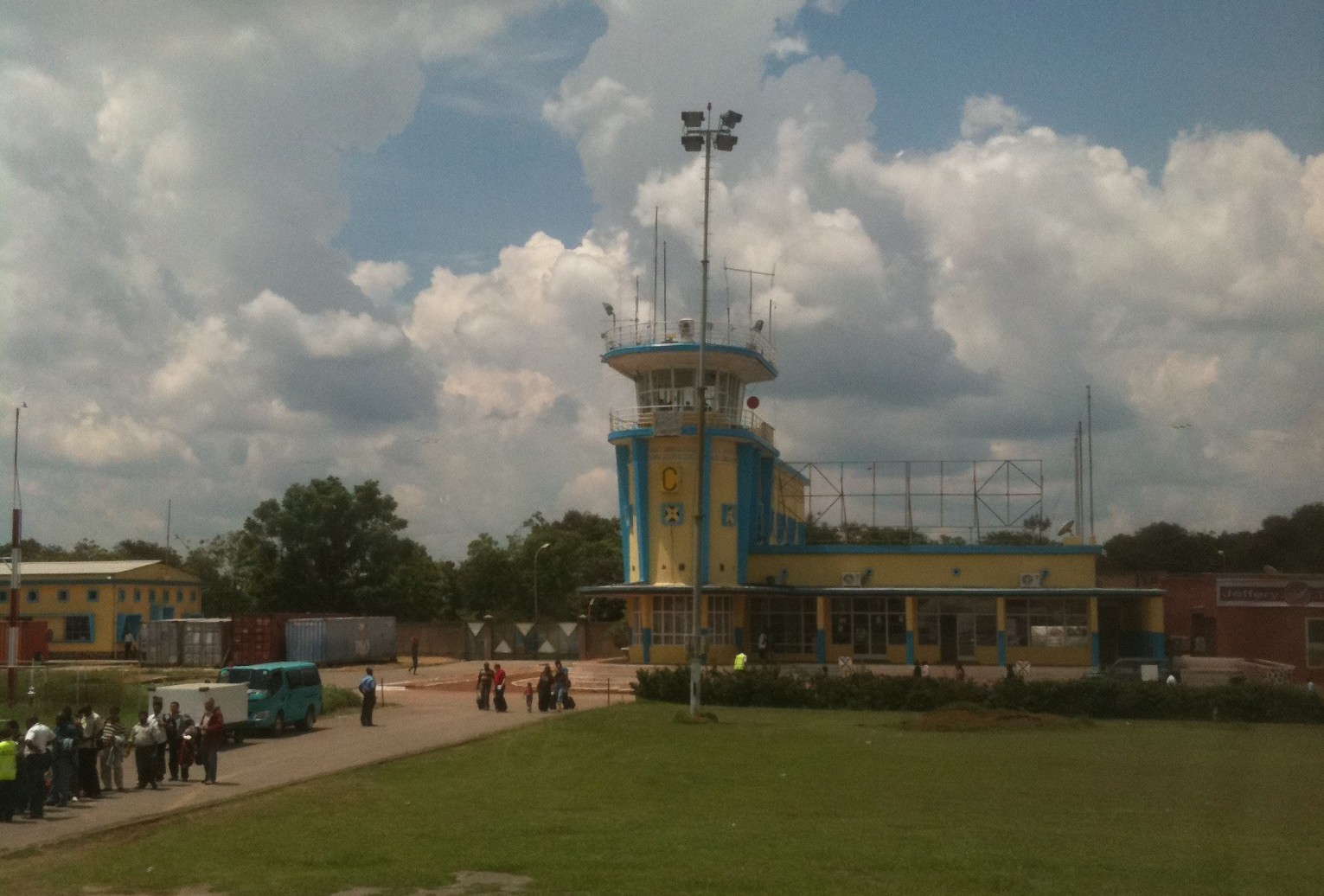
Lubumbashi International Airport

The city serves as a distribution centre for such minerals as copper, cobalt, zinc, tin, and coal.

=== Road ===
The city is crossed by Transafrican Highway 9 (TAH 9), which connects it to the cities of Lusaka and Kolwezi.

=== Rail ===
Lubumbashi is the center of the railway lines from Cape to Cairo Railway, which serves as a link with the cities of Ilebo, Kindu, Tenke, Sakania and Ndola.

In Tenke, the city connects with Kolwezi and Lobito, through the Benguela railway.

=== Air ===
Lubumbashi is home to the modern Lubumbashi International Airport.

== Education ==
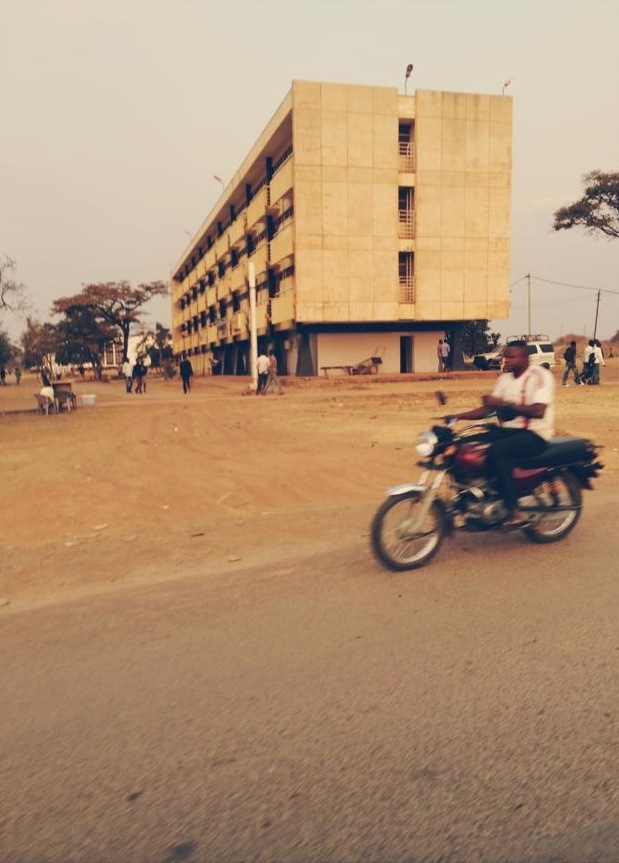
University of Lubumbashi

The largest institution of higher education is the University of Lubumbashi, founded in 1955, with also the teaching institutions Protestant University of Lubumbashi and the Graduate Institute of Health Sciences.

Multiple international schools are present in Lubumbashi, including a Belgian school (École Privée Belge de Lubumbashi), a French school (Établissement scolaire français Blaise-Pascal), and a British school (British International School of Lubumbashi).

== Urban infrastructure ==
=== Parks ===
Muyambo Kyasa popularized the concept of parks. Muyambo Park opened in 2010. Located about 15 km from Lubumbashi, it is a large garden where children can play games, and adults relax. Other parks (or farms) include Mikembo and Futuka (once a reserve, now closed) on Kasenga Road in the city's outskirts.

=== Zoo ===
The zoo of Lubumbashi is one of the most visited tourist attractions. It was created during the colonial period, and is considered the most attractive zoo in the country. During the years of war, it deteriorated but it has been rehabilitated by AZLU, a non-profit organization. By 2007, great animals had been acquired for the zoo. AZLU is keeping the zoo "for education purposes, and the protection of the natural heritage of the country," as it can be read on signs. Today, it has almost been restocked with lions, tigers, monkeys, apes, pelicans, wart hogs, crocodiles, snakes, turtles, monitor lizards, eagles, parrots, ostriches, gazelles, etc. Apart from animals, the zoo features a restaurant, a veterinary center, and a termite museum.

== Culture ==
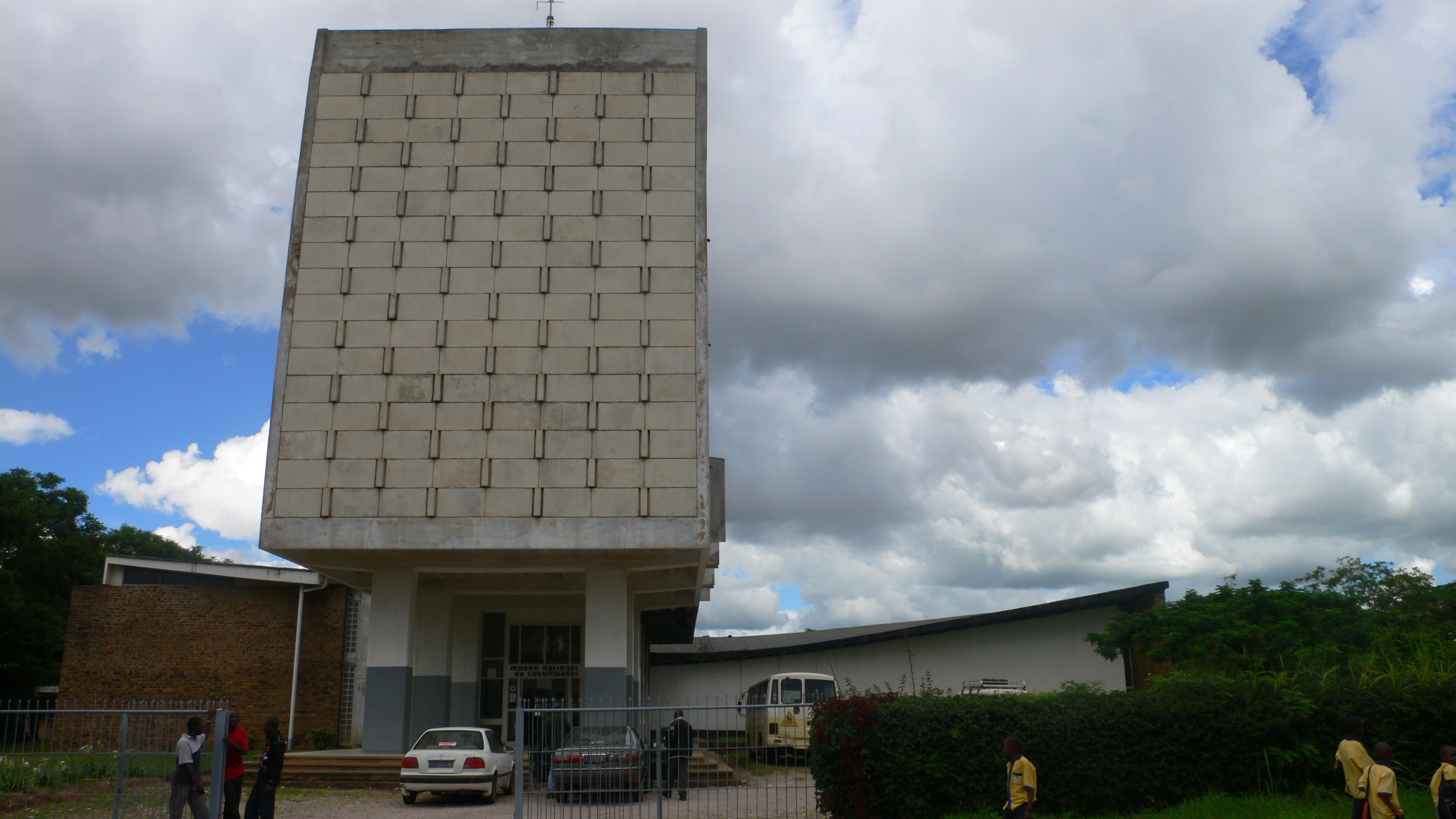
The National Museum of Lubumbashi

Attractions in the city include a botanical garden, a zoo, and the regional archaeological and ethnological National Museum of Lubumbashi. Every two years, the Biennale of Lubumbashi is held across the city, showcasing works by artists from the region. In an interview in Ocula Magazine in 2019, the Biennale's artistic director, Sandrine Colard explained, 'The Congo is a country that is perpetually in the future. All of these different periods coalescing in one city is something I wanted to address.'

=== Art ===
Bogumił Jewsiewicki says that contemporary Lubumbashi art making is weak, especially when compared to the Kinshasan. He writes,

No Lubumbashi popular painter has had an international career like that of the Kinshasa artist Chéri Samba, and there are in fact a number of artists and musicians in Kinshasa whom the whirlwind of international success has whisked farther from local audiences than any artist in Lubumbashi, and not only in Lubumbashi but in the surrounding province of Katanga.

He names painters like Pilipili, Mwenze, Angali, Nkulu wa Nkulu, Maka, Tshimbumba, Dekab, and others.

=== Cinema ===
Ciné Bétamax, formerly "Ciné Palace" and "Ciné Eden", are the only modern movie theaters in the city which generally show popular recent Hollywood productions as well as NC-17 films. However, they also show movies about Congolese and African recent history like Mister Bob, Sniper: Reloaded, SEAL Team 8: Behind Enemy Lines, and Tears of the Sun. Before films, they both showed Congolese and international music videos, and US wrestling. The communication department of the University of Lubumbashi has collaborated with the movie theater to show students' films.

Ciné Bétamax in particular also screens great football matches, and local singers' concerts and Christian meetings are regularly held here.

Nigeria's Nollywood films are also, as in many other parts of the DRC and Africa, popular among the residents. These films are often sold on VCD and DVD platforms.

=== Music ===
The popular music from Kinshasa is much appreciated and played in Lubumbashi. Jean-Bosco Mwenda is likely the most famous Katangese musician. Many of his songs have become classical, and are endlessly remixed by new young artists. Modern Lubumbashi singers fall into two groups: those who play Soukous, such as Jo Kizi and Képi Prince, and those who play international urban music, such as Ced Koncept, Tshumani, M-Joe, RJ Kanierra, Oxygène, Agresivo, Nelson Tshi, and Da Costa on the other. Most artists are influenced by successful Dj Spilulu's productions, Kinshasa singers Fally Ipupa, Ferré Gola and World Music.

Lubumbashi music is characterized by the use of many languages (Swahili, Lingala, Kiluba, French and some English) in the lyrics. It is rare to hear songs composed in only one language. This code switching and mixing expresses the cosmopolitan character of the city, but some critics think it weakens the lyrics, which seem to be particularly made for teenagers anyway. Serge Manseba and Karibyona are humorist-singers featured by G'Sparks.

In April 2026, the city hosted the 2026 edition of the Amani Festival, it having been relocated from Goma due to the conflict in the country's East.

=== French cultural influence ===
The Institut Français (formally known as Centre Culturel Français), located in the heart of the city, contributes a great deal to the cultural and artistic life of Lubumbashi. Students and researchers spend time in its library; it shows European and other French-language films; produces plays and other shows in its theater; and features local singers' records for sale on display at the entrance.

=== Radio Okapi's cultural participation ===
Radio Okapi's Lubumbashi presenters participate each Saturday evening in Métissage, the cultural program of the radio. The whole country is informed of the cultural activities in the city.

== Media ==
=== National channel (RTNC/Katanga) ===
RTNC (Congolese National Radio and Television) has a provincial station located in Lubumbashi district at the junction of Lubilanshi and Sandoa. It has been very influential from the 1960s to the mid-1990s, at the end of the one-party system, and before the information technology revolution.

=== Independent channels ===
Zenith Radio, the first independent radio station in the city, started broadcasting in 1996; since then numerous radio and television stations have been established. They can be classified in three groups: religious channels (Zenith, RTIV, Canal de Vie, RNS, etc.), commercial channels (RTA, Mwangaza, Nyota, RTLJ, Malaïka, Kyondo, etc.), and mixed ones like Wantanshi Radio and Television.

== Notable people ==
- Baloji (born 1978), hip hop artist and actor.
- Bismack Biyombo (born 1992), NBA player currently with the San Antonio Spurs
- Grady Diangana (born 1998), Footballer
- Albert Kanta Kambala (1958–2008), Zaire international footballer
- Aimé Ngoy Mukena (1954–2022), Politician (Governor of Katanga, Minister of National Defense, Minister of Hydrocarbons, Member of Parliament) and Professor
- Freddy Mulongo (born 1965), Congolese journalist
- Oscar Tshiebwe (born 1999), Basketball player for the Kentucky Wildcats men's basketball team.
- Lous and the Yakuza (born 1996), singer, rapper, songwriter, model, and artist
- Tshala Muana (1958–2022), singer and dancer
- Frédéric (1939–2003) Politician (Deputy Minister of Mines and then Minister of Mines in the Laurent-Désiré Kabila government)
- Robert Kidiaba (born 1976) Politician and former professional footballer He spent most of his club career with TP Mazembe
- Vincent Tshituka (born 1998) Rugby union player for the Sharks team.

== Sports ==
=== Basketball ===
Basketball players Myck Kabongo and Bismack Biyombo are from Lubumbashi. Oscar Tshiebwe, the consensus 2022 NCAA Division I men's player of the year at the University of Kentucky, is also from Lubumbashi. These high-profile recruitments have resulted in the increased popularity of street basketball in Lubumbashi.

=== Equestrian ===
Lubumbashi is home to the Cercle Hippique de Lubumbashi, Congo's last surviving equestrian club. Historically, the club's membership has been white, but by the 2000s, black youth have become the majority of the club's riders. Malta David Forrest, the CEO of Forrest Group, is the club's president.

=== Football ===
Football is the most popular sport in Lubumbashi. The city is home to football clubs of the top national level such as FC Saint Eloi Lupopo, CS Don Bosco and TP Mazembe. TP Mazembe is the most successful club in national competitions and the most successful Congolese club in international football achieving 5 Africa's Champions League and reaching a FIFA Club World Cup final losing 3–0 against Inter Milan. The Chairman of Mazembe is the former governor of the province of Katanga Moïse Katumbi Chapwe.

Until 1960, Congolese football was segregated between whites-only and blacks-only leagues and competitions. In 1911 the whites-only Ligue de Football du Katanga was founded in Elisabethville, organising in 1925 the first official local championship called the B. Smith Cup. The Katanga tournament was won by teams from Lubumbashi every recorded season except 2005. Simultaneously three blacks-only regional tournaments were played in the country. In 1950, the 'black' Elisabethville Football Association (FASI, Fédérations et Associations Sportives Indigènes) had over 30 affiliated clubs competing in four leagues divided over 3 divisions.

Both black and white tournaments in Lubumbashi and the country were played simultaneously until 1960, when they were unified. Since then the traditionally black clubs have dominated both local and national football.

The 'black' Ligue de Football du Elisabethville, now renamed the Ligue de Football du Lubumbashi, is the city's football tournament, organized since 1960 by the city's federation EFLU. FC Saint-Eloi Lupopo won the EFLU league 25 times in all up to 2003 being the most successful club in the seasons for which records are known (some are not known).

== Sister city ==
- Liège, Belgium

== See also ==
- Capture of Lubumbashi
