= Congo Swahili =

Dialect of Swahili spoken in the DRC

- Kingwana
- Native to: Democratic Republic of the Congo
- Speakers: L1: 2.0 million (2019); L2: 9.1 million (1991); Total: 11 million (2019)
- Language family: Niger–Congo: Atlantic–Congo; Volta-Congo; Benue–Congo; Bantoid; Southern Bantoid; Bantu; Northeast Bantu; Northeast Coast Bantu; Sabaki; Swahili; Congo Swahili
- Dialects: Katanga; Kivu; Lualaba; Ituri Kingwana; Maniema Kingwana
- Writing system: Latin script (Roman Swahili alphabet); Arabic script (Arabic Swahili alphabet); Swahili Braille

Language codes
- ISO 639-3: swc
- Glottolog: cong1236
- The area where Congo Swahili is spoken is highlighted in light yellow.

Congo Swahili, formerly sometimes known as Zaïre Swahili, are the varieties of the Swahili language spoken in the Democratic Republic of The Congo.

== Dialects ==
Congo Swahili includes two main dialects which possess distinct historical and linguistic differences: Maniema (Kingwana) and Katanga Swahili. The Katanga dialect is particularly noted for being extremely divergent and mutually unintelligible with other Swahili dialects and some consider it a creole language. The most fundamental difference lies in how and when these dialects formed.

=== Maniema Kingwana ===
- Roots: This is the older variety. It originated in the 19th century with the arrival of Arab-Swahili traders (like Tippu Tip) from the East African coast.
- Context: It developed as a trade language and a marker of the Islamized "Bangwana" communities in the Maniema and Ituri forests. It retains a stronger historical link to the "Classic" Swahili of the coast, though heavily simplified over time.
- Vocabulary: Retains more Arabic loanwords (due to the Islamic influence of the original traders) compared to the south. It retains archaic Kiswahili features that Standard Swahili (Kiswahili Sanifu) has lost. Influenced by the languages of the Maniema and Kivu rainforests (e.g., Kilega, Kihemba, Kisonge, etc.).
- Sociolinguistic status: Historically viewed as a "language of authority" or religion in the interior. It is often associated with the specific Waungwana ethnic identity.

=== Katanga Swahili ===
- Roots: This is a younger variety (early 20th century). It emerged specifically in the mining camps of the Copperbelt (Lubumbashi, Likasi, Kolwezi) under Belgian colonial rule.
- Context: It was born from a mixture of migrant laborers who spoke disparate languages (Bemba, Luba-Kasai, Luba-Katanga) and were forced to communicate in a work environment. It is often described by linguists as a creole or a "pidgin-creole" because it developed its own nativized grammar very quickly separate from the coast.
- Vocabulary: Because it grew in colonial urban centers, it absorbed a massive amount of French vocabulary, not just for nouns but for connectors and adverbs (e.g., using parce que instead of kwa sababu). It has deep lexical borrowing from Kiluba (Luba-Katanga) and Bemba. It is the origin of distinct urban slang (sometimes called Nuta or Yanké) that is less present in the more rural or traditional Kingwana areas.
- Sociolinguistic status: Viewed as a symbol of urban identity and Katangese pride. It is the mother tongue of millions of city dwellers who may not speak any other "tribal" language.
- Grammar: The complete loss of the locative suffix -ni (e.g., using ku soko instead of sokoni).
- Phonology: Distinct tonal patterns influenced by the Luba and Bemba languages of the mining workforce.

== Grammar ==
These are some of the grammatical innovations of Congo Swahili that do not exist in Standard Swahili:

- A distinction between near past and remote past.
- A distinction between near future and remote future.
- A distinction between present progressive and present habitual.
- Loss of the locatives ending in -ni (Katanga dialect)

== Publications ==
The Jehovah's Witnesses (Mashahidi wa Yehova) regularly publish religious articles, videos and booklets in Congo Swahili. Translations of the Bible into Congo Swahili have also been published: the first partial translation of the New Testament was published in the Ituri Kingwana dialect in 1921, followed by a full translation in 1937.

== See also ==
- Swahili language
- Swahili literature
- Languages of Africa
- Languages of the Democratic Republic of the Congo
