= Lingwala =

- Commune
- Commune de Lingwala
- Parliament building
- Lingwala on map of Kinshasa city-province
- Location in DR Congo
- Coordinates: 04°19′13″S 15°17′54″E
- Country: DR Congo
- City-Province: Kinshasa

Area
  - Total: 2.88 km^{2} (1.11 sq mi)

Population (2004 est.)
  - Total: 94,635
  - Density: 32,900/km^{2} (85,100/sq mi)

Lingwala is a municipality (commune) in the Lukunga district of Kinshasa, the capital city of the Democratic Republic of the Congo.

It is situated in northern Kinshasa, south of Gombe and Boulevard du 30 Juin.

== Demographics ==
Historical population
Year	1967	1970	1984	2003	2004
Pop.	37,240	46,209	49,173	91,520	94,635
±%	—	+24.1%	+6.4%	+86.1%	+3.4%
