= List of companies of the Democratic Republic of the Congo =

Location of the Democratic Republic of the Congo

The Democratic Republic of the Congo is a country located in the African Great Lakes region of Central Africa. It is the second largest country in Africa by area and the eleventh largest in the world. With a population of over 120 million, the Democratic Republic of the Congo is the nineteenth most populous nation in the world, the fourth most populous nation in Africa, as well as the most populous officially Francophone country.

Sparsely populated in relation to its area, the country is home to a vast potential of natural resources and mineral wealth, its untapped deposits of raw minerals are estimated to be worth in excess of US$24 trillion, yet the economy of the Democratic Republic of the Congo has declined drastically since the mid-1980s. At the time of its independence in 1960, the Democratic Republic of the Congo was the second most industrialized country in Africa after South Africa; it boasted a thriving mining sector and its agriculture sector was relatively productive. Since then, however, corruption, war and political instability have been a severe detriment to further growth, today leaving DRC with the world's lowest GDP per capita.

== Notable firms ==
This list includes notable companies with primary headquarters located in the country. The industry and sector follow the Industry Classification Benchmark taxonomy. Organizations which have ceased operations are included and noted as defunct.

Notable companies Status: P=Private, S=State; A=Active, D=Defunct
Name	Industry	Sector	Headquarters	Founded	Notes	Status	
Air Kasaï	Consumer services	Airlines	Kinshasa	1983	Airline	P	A
Air Tropiques	Consumer services	Airlines	Kinshasa	2001	Airline	P	D
Air Zaïre	Consumer services	Airlines	Kinshasa	1961	Airline, defunct 1995	P	D
Equity Banque Commerciale du Congo	Financials	Banks	Kinshasa	1909	Commercial bank	P	A
Camrose Resources	Basic materials	Nonferrous metals	?	?	Copper, cobalt	P	D
Central Bank of the Congo	Financials	Banks	Kinshasa	1997	Central bank	P	A
Cohydro	Oil & gas	Integrated oil & gas	Kinshasa	1999	Petrochemical distribution	S	A
Compagnie Africaine d'Aviation	Consumer services	Airlines	Kinshasa	1991	Regional airline	P	A
Congo Airlines	Consumer services	Airlines	Kinshasa	?	Airline, defunct 1994	P	D
Congo Express	Consumer services	Airlines	Lubumbashi	2010	Airline, defunct 2012	P	D
Congolese Posts and Telecommunications Corporation	Industrials	Delivery services	Kinshasa	1885	Postal services	S	A
Société nationale des Chemins de fer du Congo	Industrials	Railroads	Kinshasa	1889	Railways	S	A
Feronia Inc.	Consumer goods	Farming & fishing	Kinshasa	1911	Farm operator	P	A
Filair	Consumer services	Airlines	Kinshasa	?	Airline	P	D
FlyCongo	Consumer services	Airlines	Kinshasa	2012	Airline, defunct 2012	P	D
Free Airlines	Consumer services	Airlines	Kinshasa	?	Airline	P	D
Galaxie Corporation	Consumer services	Airlines	Kinshasa	?	Airline	P	D
Gécamines	Basic materials	Nonferrous metals	Lubumbashi	1906	Copper and cobalt mining	S	A
Groupe L'Avenir	Consumer services	Media	Kinshasa	1994	Publishing group	P	A
Korongo Airlines	Consumer services	Airlines	Lubumbashi	2009	Airline, defunct 2015	P	D
Lignes Aériennes Congolaises	Consumer services	Airlines	Kinshasa	2005	Airline, defunct 2013	P	D
Malift Air	Consumer services	Airlines	Kinshasa	1995	Airline, defunct 2009	P	D
Office National des Transports	Industrials	Transportation services	Kinshasa	1935	Railway, ports	S	A
Orange RDC	Telecommunications	Mobile telecommunications	Kinshasa	2001	Part of Orange S.A. (France)	P	A
Radio Television Groupe Avenir	Consumer services	Broadcasting & entertainment	Kinshasa	2003	Television network	P	A
Rawbank	Financials	Banks	Kinshasa	2001	Commercial bank	P	A
Regideso	Utilities	Water	Kinshasa	1933	Water distribution	S	A
Scibe Airlift	Consumer services	Airlines	Kinshasa	1976	Airline, defunct 1998	P	D
Société Aurifère du Kivu et du Maniema (SAKIMA)	Basic materials	Nonferrous metals	Kinshasa	1997	Tin mining	S	A
Societé Minière de Bakwanga (MIBA)	Basic materials	Diamonds and Gemstones	Mbuji-Mayi	1962	Diamond mining	S	A
Société nationale d'électricité (SNEL)	Utilities	Conventional electricity	Kinshasa	1970	Electrical distribution	S	A
Sodefor	Basic materials	Forestry	Kinshasa	1994	Forestry	P	A
Supercell (mobile network)	Telecommunications	Mobile telecommunications	?	2002	Mobile network	P	A
TEXAF	Consumer goods	Clothing & accessories	Kinshasa	1925	Textiles, defunct 2007	P	D
TMK Air Commuter	Consumer services	Airlines	Goma	?	Airline, defunct 2011	P	D
Trust Merchant Bank	Financials	Banks	Lubumbashi	2004	Commercial bank	P	A
Wimbi Dira Airways	Consumer services	Airlines	Kinshasa	2003	Airline	P	D

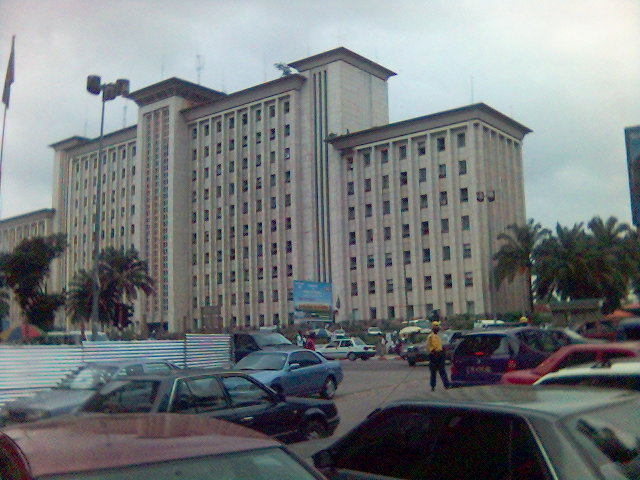
Office National des Transports head office in Kinshasa

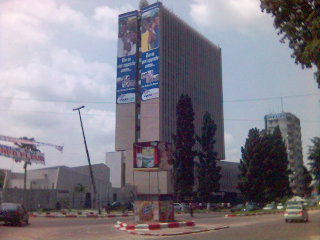
Regideso building in Kinshasa

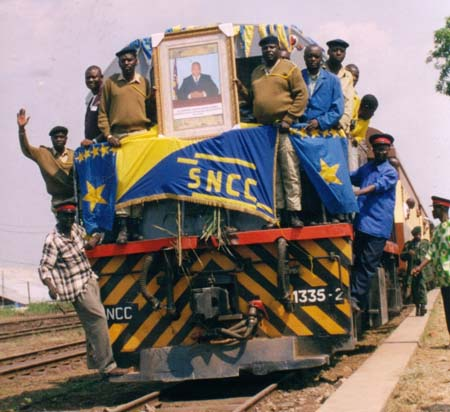
Congo Railway's first train arrives in Kindu in 2004 after the rehabilitation of the line

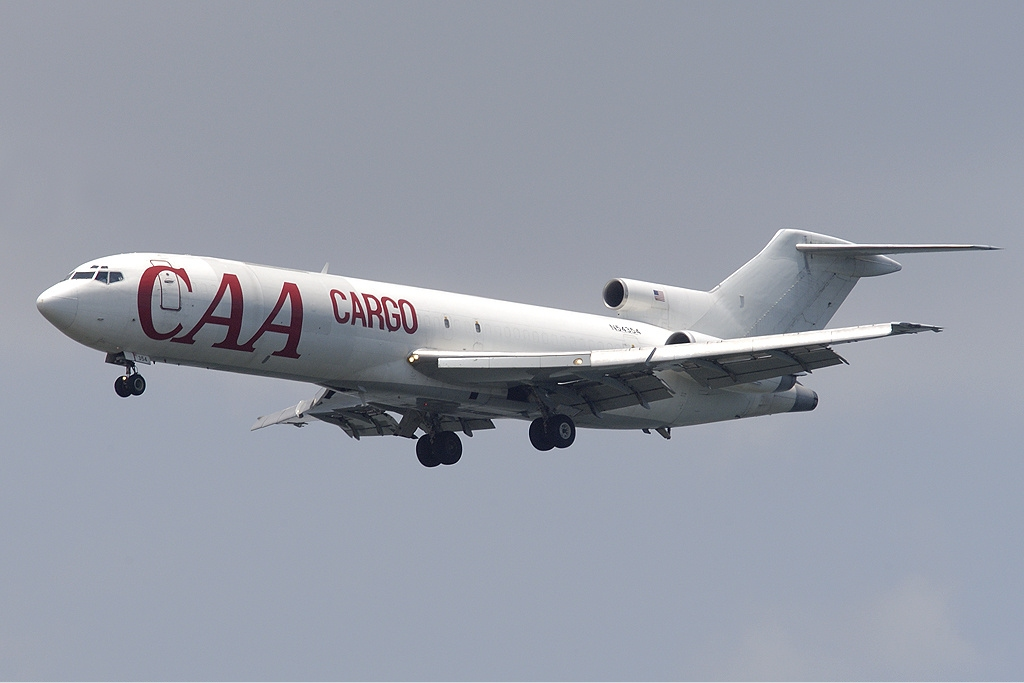
A Compagnie Africaine d'Aviation Boeing 727 freighter aircraft departing Goma International Airport (2006)

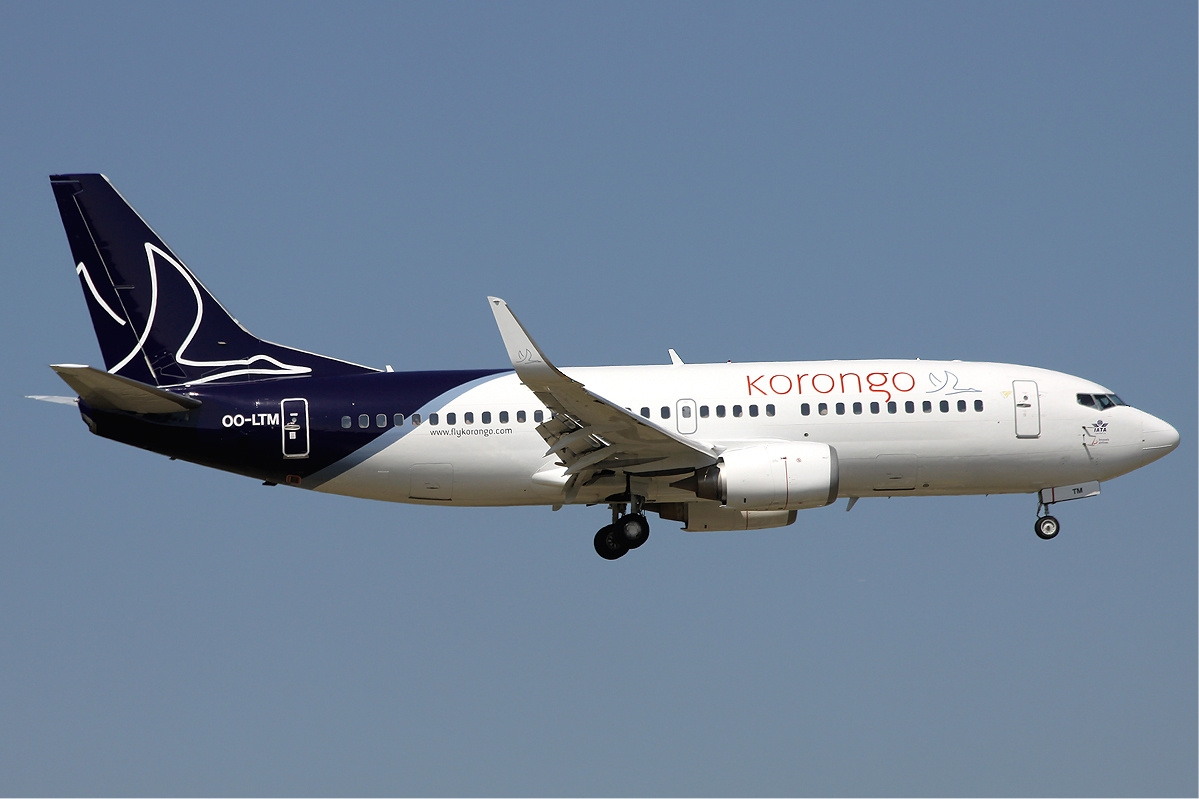
A Korongo Airlines Boeing 737-300. By the time the photo was taken (2011), this aircraft was still operated by Brussels Airlines.

== See also ==
- Economy of the Democratic Republic of the Congo
- List of airlines of the Democratic Republic of the Congo
- List of banks in the Democratic Republic of the Congo
- Mining industry of the Democratic Republic of the Congo
