= Banking in the Democratic Republic of the Congo =

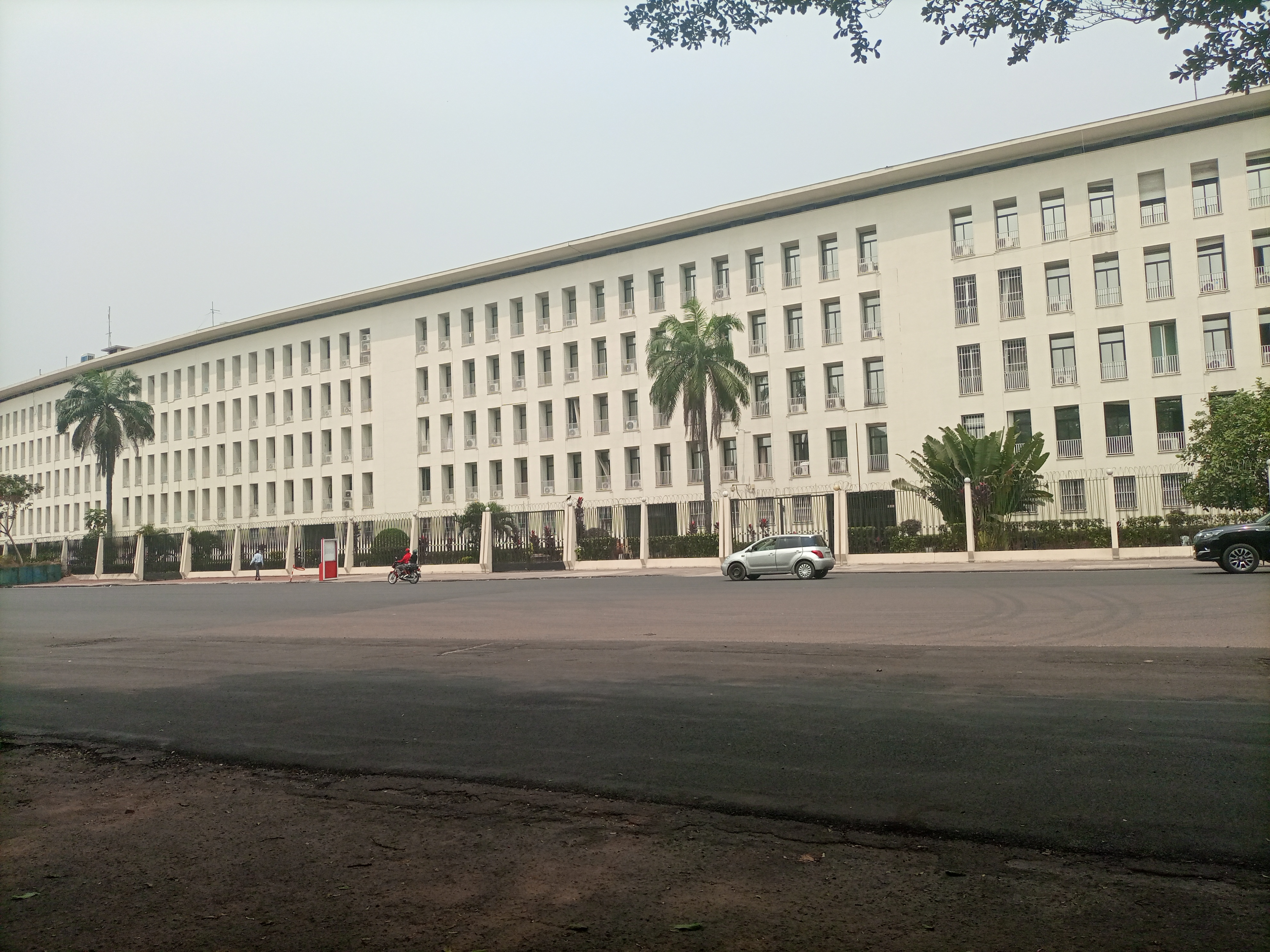
Headquarters of the Central Bank of the Congo, Gombe, Kinshasa

Banking in the Democratic Republic of the Congo began during the Belgian colonial period, when the Banque du Congo Belge (BCB) was established in 1909 as the colony's commercial and issuing bank. In subsequent decades, additional commercial and specialized financial institutions (institutions financières spécialisées) were created to support trade, industry, agriculture, housing, and public investment. After independence in 1960, the Central Bank of the Congo (Banque Centrale du Congo; BCC) was established as the country's monetary authority and assumed responsibility for issuing currency, formulating monetary policy, regulating credit institutions, supervising the financial system, and maintaining the stability of the Congolese franc.

The Congolese banking system consists of the BCC and a network of second-tier credit institutions, including commercial banks, savings and credit cooperatives, savings banks, specialized financial institutions, and financial companies. The sector is governed by Law No. 003/2002 on the activities and supervision of credit institutions and Law No. 005/2002 on the organization and functioning of the Central Bank of the Congo. Credit institutions must obtain BCC authorization before operating and are prudentially supervised. Specialized public institutions were established to mobilize savings and finance economic development. These include the Caisse Générale d'Épargne du Congo (CADECO) in June 1950, the Institut National de Sécurité Sociale (INSS) on 29 June 1961, the Société Nationale d'Assurance (SONAS) on 23 November 1966, the Société Financière de Développement (SOFIDE) on 9 January 1970, the Caisse Nationale d'Épargne et de Crédit Immobilier (CNECI) in 1971, and the Fonds de Promotion Industrielle (FPI) on 7 August 1989. Commercial banks are represented by the Association Congolaise des Banques (ACB), founded in 1952.

The banking sector was severely disrupted during the 1980s and 1990s economic crises. Declining deposits and lending, hyperinflation, currency depreciation, and widespread dollarization weakened financial intermediation, while shortages of banknotes and the discounting of bank deposits into cash prolonged the crisis. Early 2000s banking reforms strengthened prudential regulation, expanded the legal definition of credit institutions, and provided a framework for restructuring and supervising the financial sector.

== History ==
=== 1909–1960: Colonial era ===
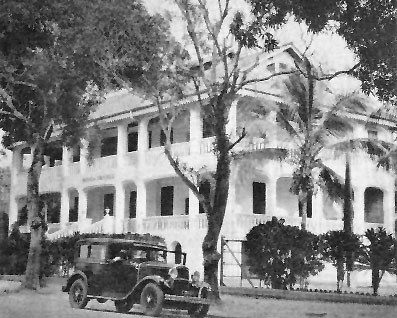
Head office of the Banque du Congo Belge in Léopoldville (now Kinshasa), photographed in 1942

Modern banking in the Democratic Republic of the Congo began during Belgian colonial rule. The first banking institution was the Banque du Congo Belge (BCB), founded in 1909 as a subsidiary of the Société Générale de Belgique. Initially created as a commercial deposit bank, it was granted the exclusive privilege of issuing currency on 7 July 1911. The expansion of colonial commerce, mining, and transportation led to the creation of additional banks. On 10 August 1911, the Banque Commerciale du Congo was founded to complement the BCB. Because the BCB's issuing role limited its commercial activities, the Banque Commerciale du Congo conducted banking activities that the BCB was prohibited from undertaking under its charter.

By 1919, the BCB had become one of Central Africa's largest banking networks, with 24 branches in the Belgian Congo, two in Tanganyika Territory, a wartime headquarters in London established during World War I, and a representative office in Antwerp. The Standard Bank of South Africa opened a branch in Élisabethville (now Lubumbashi) and operated in the Congo until 1936. The interwar period brought further diversification of the banking sector. The Crédit Général du Congo (also known as Crégéco), established in 1920 as a holding company, acquired the Congolese branches of the Banque de Bruxelles in Léopoldville (now Kinshasa), Élisabethville, Matadi, and Stanleyville (now Kisangani) in 1924, one year after their opening. In 1929, Crégéco operations were transferred to the Banque Belge d'Afrique (BBA), which functioned as a commercial bank and was later renamed the Union Zaïroise de Banques (UZB) after the country was renamed Zaire in 1971.

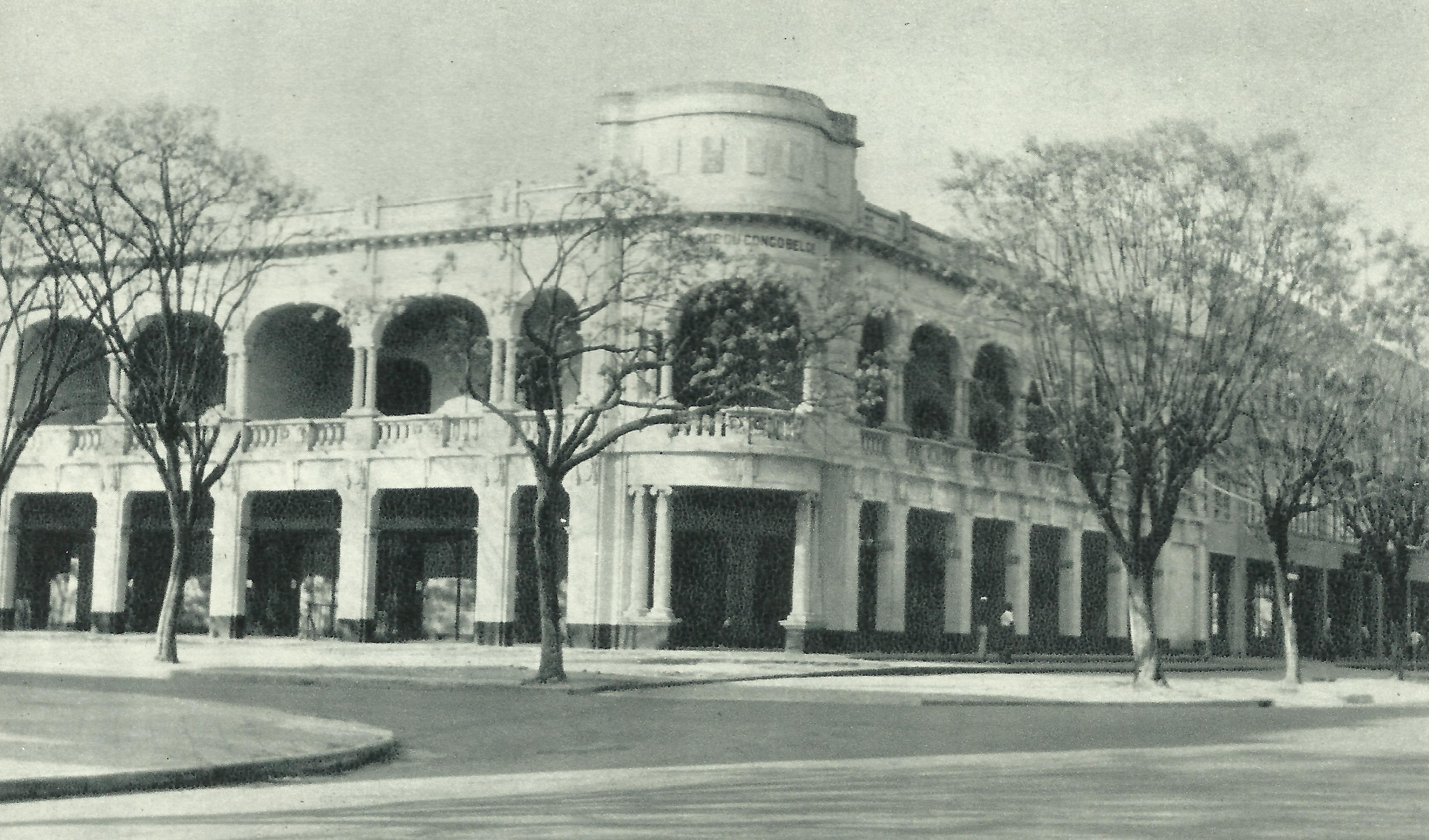
Branch of the BCC in Elisabethville (now Lubumbashi) in 1926

Foreign banks also entered the colonial market, including the Portuguese Banco Nacional Ultramarino, which established a branch in Léopoldville in 1919 before transferring it to the Banco de Angola in 1926, relocating it to Boma in 1934, and withdrawing from the Congo in 1947. The Union du Crédit d'Élisabethville, founded in 1928, ceased operations during the Great Depression. After the Second World War, colonial authorities expanded the banking sector to support reconstruction. The Société Congolaise de Banque was established in 1947, while the Banque Congolaise pour l'Industrie, le Commerce et l'Agriculture was established in 1950. The Crédit Congolais followed in 1951, and in the same year the colonial government established the Central Bank of the Belgian Congo and Rwanda-Urundi (Banque Centrale du Congo Belge et du Ruanda-Urundi; BCCBRU), which commenced operations on 1 July 1952 as the central bank for the Belgian Congo and Ruanda-Urundi.

The Kredietbank began operating in the Congo in 1952 and later absorbed the Banque Congolaise pour le Commerce, l'Industrie et l'Agriculture, renaming it Krediet Bank-Congo before it eventually became the Crédit Commercial Africain after independence. The Banque Commerciale du Congo was dissolved in 1952, having become redundant following the establishment of the new central bank. In 1954, the Banque de Paris et des Pays-Bas became the last major foreign bank to establish operations in the Belgian Congo before independence in 1960.

=== Post-independence ===
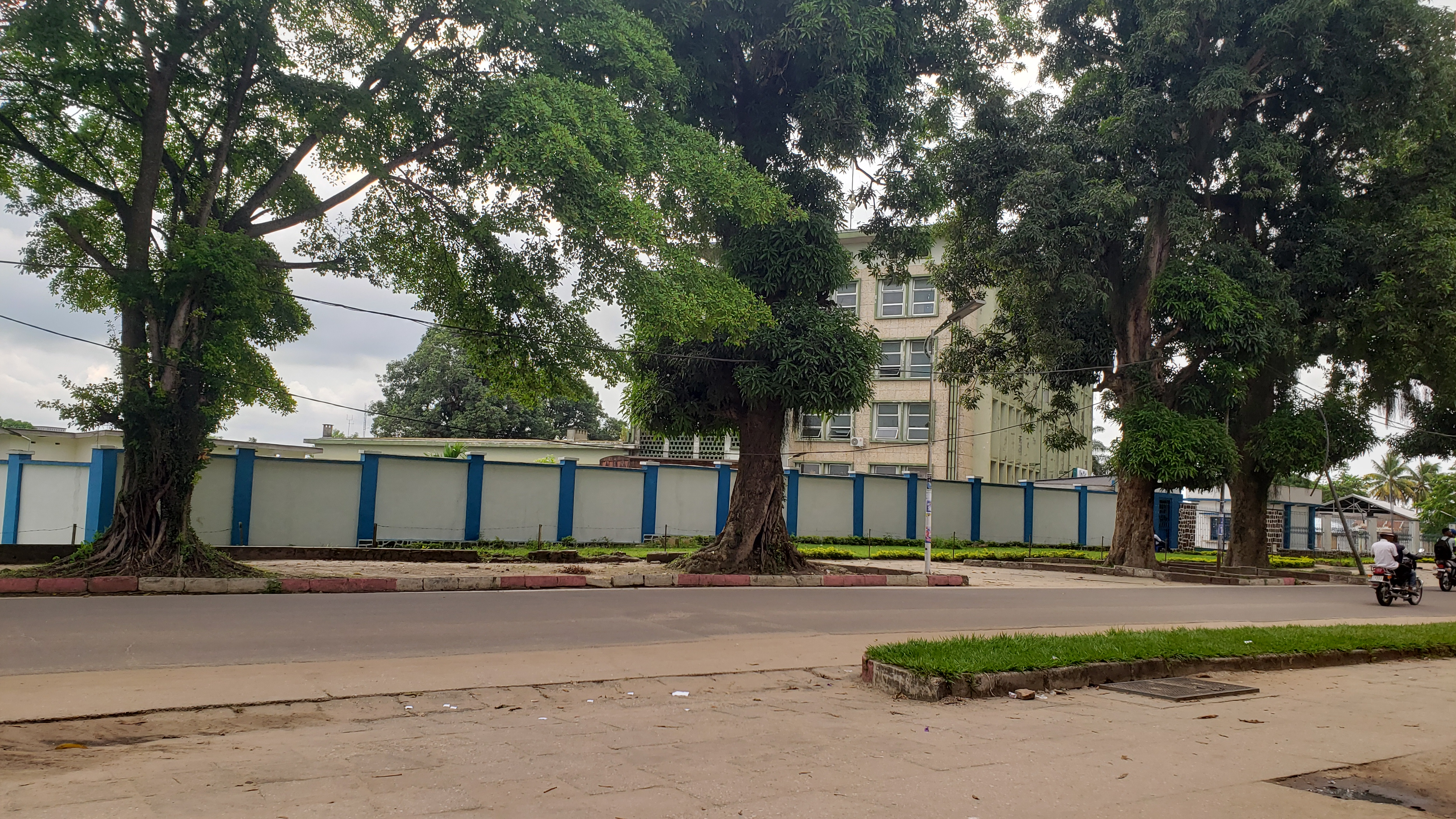
Branch of the BCC in Kisangani

After independence in 1960, an agreement signed in Geneva that same year initiated the process of dissolving the BCCBRU and establishing two independent central banks: one for the Congo and another for Rwanda-Urundi. On 3 October 1960, a decree created the Monetary Council of the Republic of Congo (Conseil Monétaire de la République du Congo) to develop recommendations for a central bank and financial framework adapted to the country's new post-independence circumstances. The Belgo-Congolese Convention on the liquidation of the BCCBRU was ratified in Brazzaville on 16 February 1961, and a decree formally established the National Bank of the Congo (Banque Nationale du Congo; BNC) on 23 February 1961. However, the Monetary Council continued to perform the bank's functions until the BNC officially commenced operations on 22 June 1964. After the country's name changed to Zaire in 1971, the BNC was renamed the National Bank of Zaire (Banque Nationale du Zaïre; BNZ) under service order No. 218 of 4 November 1971. A subsequent order, No. 219 of 25 November 1971, replaced the designation with the Bank of Zaire (Banque du Zaïre; BZ).

The late 1960s and early 1970s saw the creation of several domestically oriented financial institutions. The Banque de Kinshasa, established in 1969, became one of the first commercial banks founded on the initiative of Congolese nationals. In 1970, the Banque Internationale pour l'Afrique au Congo (BIAC) was created as a subsidiary of the Banque Internationale pour l'Afrique Occidentale (BIAO), while the Development Finance Corporation (Société Financière de Développement; SOFIDE) was established with support from the World Bank Group and international financial institutions to finance medium- and long-term investment projects.

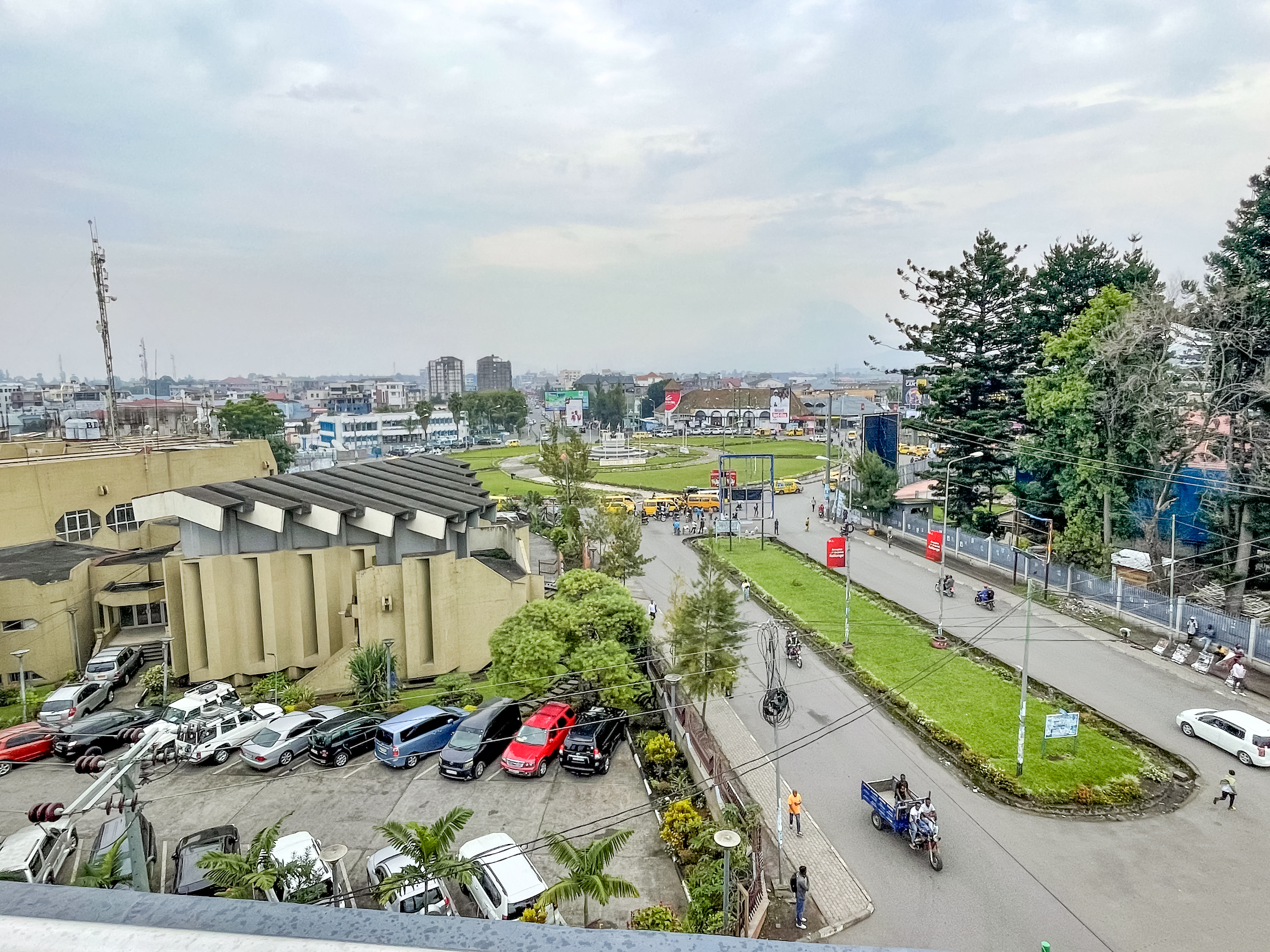
Aerial view of the Banks Roundabout, popularly known as BDGL, one of Goma's landmarks.

Other specialized financial institutions (institutions financières spécialisées) were also created to support economic development. These included the National Savings and Real Estate Credit Bank (Caisse Nationale d'Épargne et de Crédit Immobilier; CNECI) in 1971, the Industrial Promotion Fund (Fonds de Promotion Industrielle; FPI) on 7 August 1989, the National Social Security Institute (Institut National de Sécurité Sociale; INSS) on 29 June 1961, the National Insurance Company (Société Nationale d'Assurance; SONAS) on 23 November 1966, and the General Savings Fund of the Congo (Caisse Générale d'Épargne du Congo; CADECO) in June 1950, which mobilized public savings and financed investment projects. These institutions formed an important component of the country's state-directed financial system.

==== 1980s–1990s: Banking crisis ====
From the early 1980s, the banking sector entered a prolonged decline due to economic recession, declining exports, and political instability. Deposits and lending contracted sharply, reducing banks' capacity to finance economic activity, while the banking intermediation ratio (loan-to-deposit ratio) fell from 3.54 in 1965 to 1.58 in 1997.

Banking intermediation ratio (In thousands of U.S. dollars):

Year	Total deposits (D)	Total credit (L)	Ratio (D/L)
1965	67,748	19,136	3.54
1970	239,306	251,326	0.95
1975	651,902	1,030,378	0.63
1980	559,339	665,000	0.84
1985	216,899	324,000	0.67
1990	625,126	507,000	1.23
1994	216,622	168,000	1.92
1997	90,476	57,237	1.58

Beginning in 1992, another structural weakness appeared as deposit money was routinely converted into cash at a discounted rate. The distortion stemmed from government payments to suppliers through bank transfers that were not supported by sufficient funds, which created book-money deposits without corresponding cash reserves. The imbalance produced a persistent liquidity shortage, preventing commercial banks from satisfying withdrawal demands and driving many depositors to a parallel cash market where bank deposits traded below face value. Under a 10:1 discount, for instance, a deposit of 1,000,000 New Zaires (NZ)—equivalent to roughly $9.50 in late 1997—would yield only 100,000 NZ, or about $0.95, in cash. One consequence of this discount was the growing circulation of banknotes outside the formal banking system, which Congolese researcher Guillain Ilanga Ekanga Bakoli Mp'o argued exacerbated cash shortages within banks and contributed to a banknote crisis. Bakoli Mp'o stated that the extent of this phenomenon could be assessed using two indicators: the currency circulation ratio and the demand deposit coverage ratio. The former measures the proportion of banknotes and coins in circulation relative to the total money supply.

Year	Currency in circulation	Deposit money	Total
1990	54.4%	45.6%	100%
1991	59.3%	40.7%	100%
1992	47.3%	52.7%	100%
1993	70.7%	29.3%	100%
1994	74.0%	26.0%	100%
1995	87.3%	12.7%	100%

Between 1990 and 1995, the currency circulation ratio increased steadily, rising from 54.4% of the money supply in 1990 to 87.3% in 1995, well above its normal level of about 55%. Meanwhile, the demand deposit coverage ratio declined in the opposite direction. Although the ratio is ordinarily close to 8%, it dropped from 7.2% in 1990 to 1.7% by 1992, the year in which bank deposits first began trading at a discount against cash.

Demand deposit coverage ratio:

Year	Commercial banks' cash holdings (a)	Banks' demand deposits (b)	Coverage ratio (a/b × 100)
1990	15	209	7.2%
1991	344	5,883	5.8%
1992	6,391	379,337	1.7%
1993	581,964	4,852,586	1.2%
1994	5,097,000	91,858,000	5.5%
1995	29,232,000	187,020,000	1.6%

Hyperinflation and increasing dollarization led to the widespread indexation of prices for goods and services. As banks faced rapidly rising operating costs, their expenses climbed from $21.6 million in 1970 to $171.4 million in 1994, an increase of nearly eightfold. Bank revenues, however, grew by only 5.8 times during the same period, causing the sector's combined financial results to deteriorate from a profit of $4.137 million in 1970 to a loss of $22.722 million by 1990.

== Structure ==
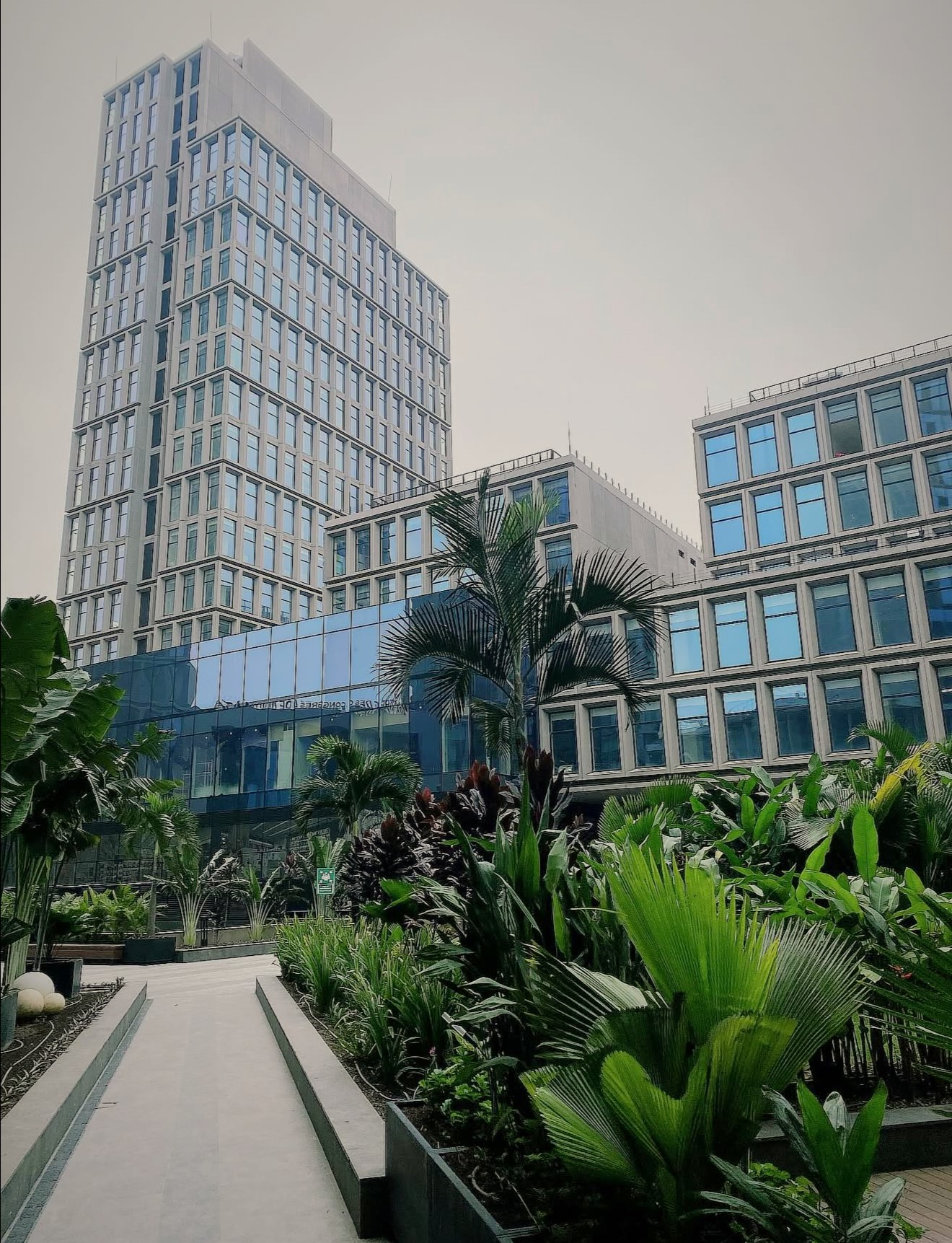
Kinshasa Financial Center

The Congolese banking system is a two-tier structure comprising the BCC and a network of licensed credit institutions. The BCC is the system's monetary authority and regulator. The second tier includes commercial banks, savings and credit cooperatives, savings banks, specialized financial institutions, and financial companies licensed by the BCC.

The modern Congolese banking system was established through the 2002 banking reforms, including Law No. 003/2002 of 2 February on the activities and supervision of credit institutions and Law No. 005/2002 of 7 May on the constitution, organization, and functioning of the Central Bank of the Congo. These laws expanded the framework governing financial institutions, introduced prudential supervision, and required all credit institutions operating in the country to obtain authorization from the Central Bank before commencing operations.

=== Central Bank of the Congo ===
The BCC is responsible for conducting monetary policy, issuing currency, maintaining price stability, regulating foreign exchange operations, supervising credit institutions, and ensuring financial stability. It intervenes in foreign exchange markets by buying and selling currencies to limit excessive fluctuations in the value of the Congolese franc. Under Law No. 005/2002, the central bank has legal, administrative, and financial independence in fulfilling its mandate.

The BCC's governance structure includes a board of directors and a governor responsible for daily administration and implementing board decisions. The governor is assisted by a vice governor, and together they form the bank's senior management. Internal oversight is conducted by several control bodies, including the board of statutory auditors, the audit committee, and the audit directorate, which oversee financial operations and internal controls.

=== Commercial banks ===
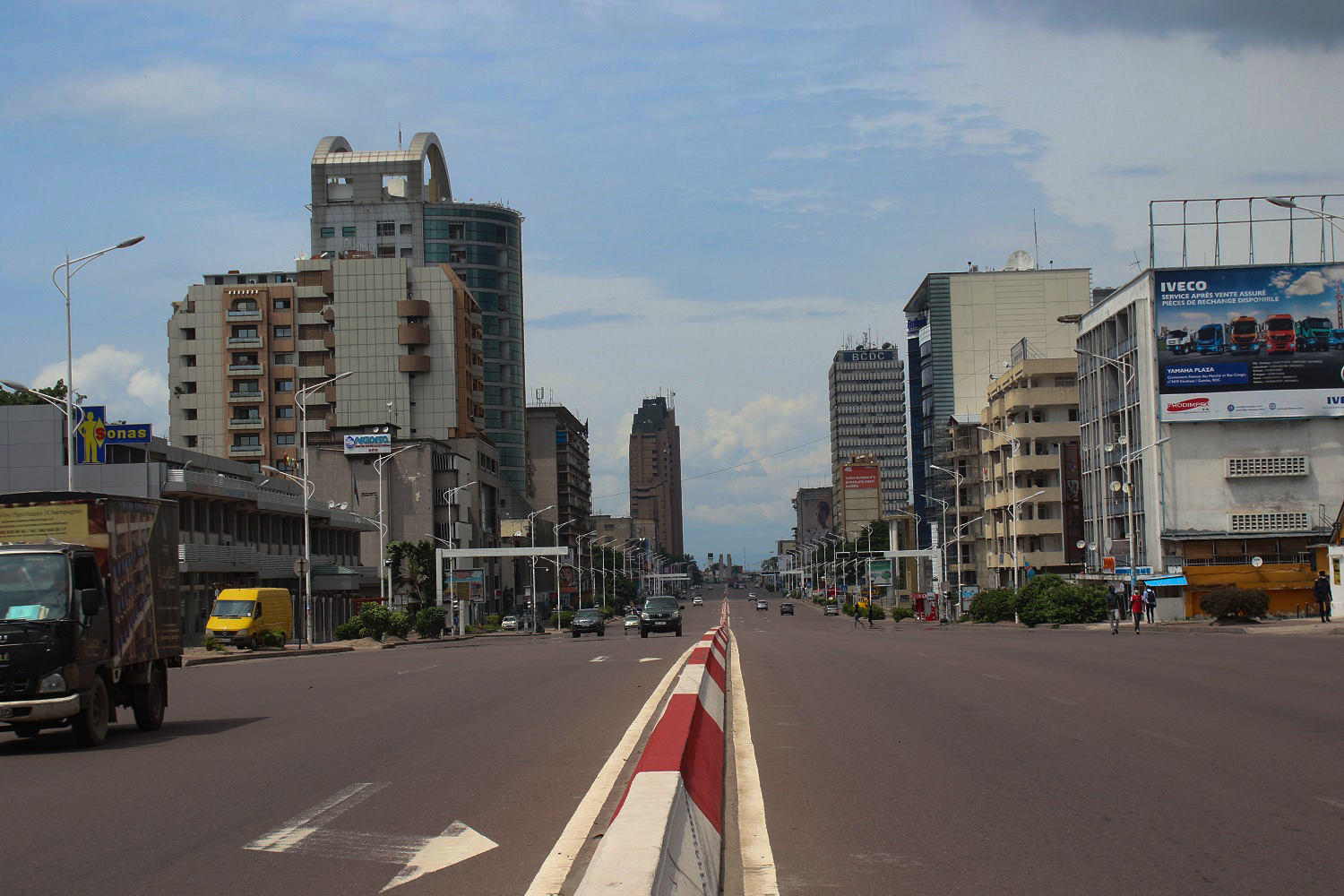
Gombe is Kinshasa's central business district and serves as the city's principal banking center.

Commercial banks are the principal providers of banking services. They accept public deposits, extend credit to individuals and businesses, facilitate domestic and international payments, provide foreign exchange services, and finance commercial activities. Historically, the banking sector developed under foreign-owned colonial institutions. After independence, domestically owned and international commercial banks expanded the sector, while banking reforms in the early twenty-first century encouraged renewed investment after decades of economic instability. Until 1998, the country had only nine commercial banks, and after that year, financial reforms and private investment led to a significant increase in licensed commercial banks. Commercial banking remains concentrated in major urban and mining centers, particularly Kinshasa, Lubumbashi, Goma, Bukavu, Matadi, Kolwezi, and Kisangani.

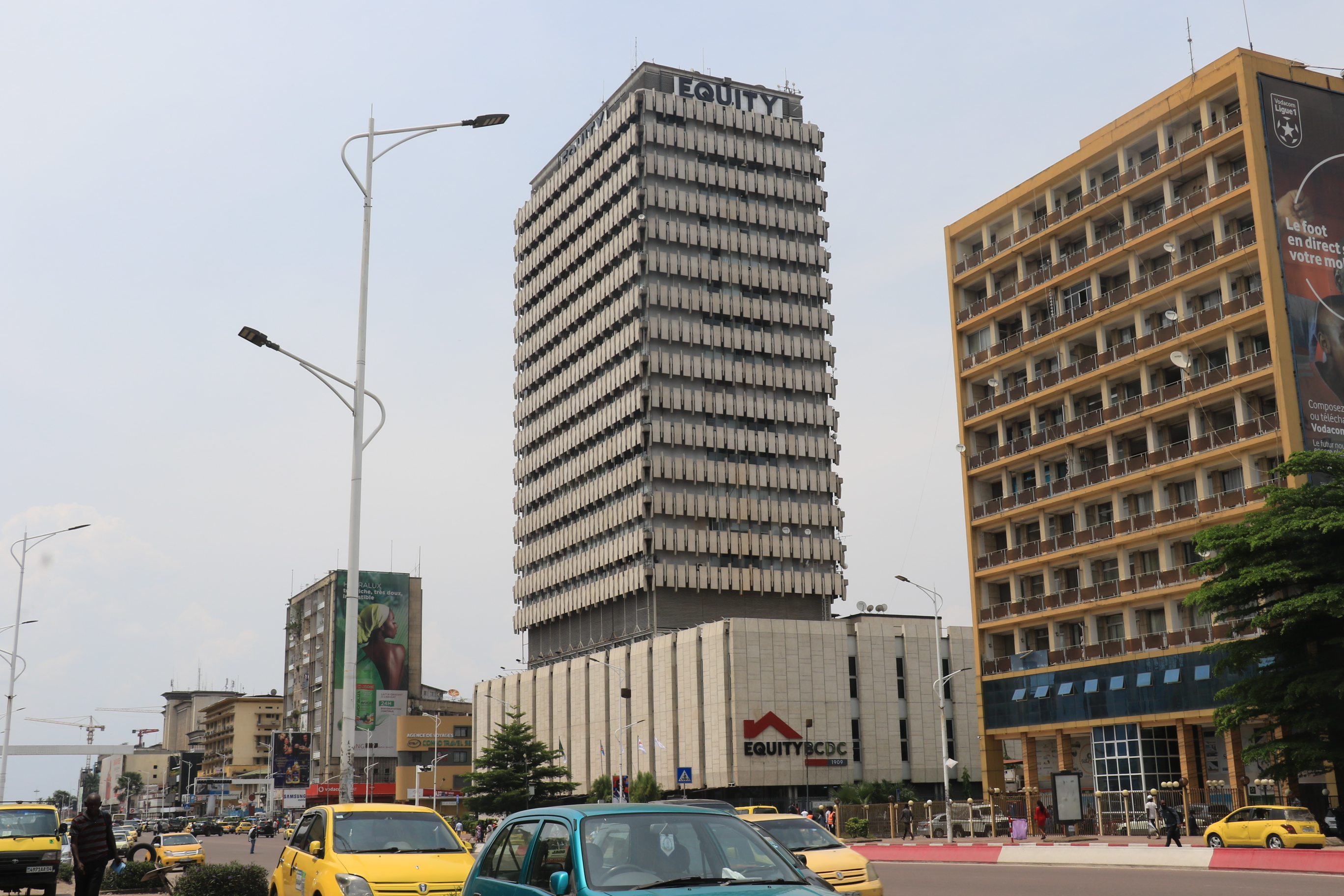
Headquarters of the Equity Banque Commerciale du Congo in Kinshasa.

Commercial banks primarily serve businesses, government institutions, and other large institutional clients, particularly those operating in the mining, import-export, telecommunications, and energy sectors. Since the 2010s, banks have also expanded retail banking services through ATMs, digital banking platforms, and agent networks. Commercial banks are organized under the Association Congolaise des Banques (ACB). The association was established by the Constituent Assembly on 22 August 1952 for an initial period of thirty years, which was extended indefinitely by the General Assembly on 18 June 1982. Law No. 003/2002 provides in Article 86 that every licensed credit institution is required to become a member of the ACB.

Commercial bank	Headquarters	Branches/agencies (where provided)
Equity Banque Commerciale du Congo (Equity BCDC)	Kinshasa	Bukavu, Butembo, Fungurume, Goma, Kananga, Kisangani, Kinshasa, Kolwezi, Likasi, Lubumbashi, Matadi, Mbuji-Mayi
Afriland First Bank (First Bank CD)	Kinshasa	—
Banque Internationale pour l'Afrique au Congo (BIAC)	Kinshasa	Goma, Lubumbashi, Matadi
Citigroup Congo (CB)	Kinshasa	—
Stanbic Bank Congo (SBC)	Kinshasa	—
Access Bank Congo (AB)	Goma	—
Banque Internationale de Crédit (BIC)	Kinshasa	Beni, Boma, Bukavu, Butembo, Lubumbashi, Matadi, Mbanza-Ngungu, Muanda
ProCredit Bank Congo	Kinshasa	—
Rawbank	Kinshasa	Fungurume, Kolwezi, Likasi, Lubumbashi, Matadi
Trust Merchant Bank (TMB)	Lubumbashi	Bandundu-Ville; Beni; Boma; Bukavu; Bunia; Butembo; Fungurume; Gbadolite; Gemena; Goma; Kabinda; Kalemie; Kamina; Kamoa; Kananga; Kasumbalesa; Kenge; Kikwit; Kilwa; Kindu; Kinshasa; Kitona; Kisangani; Kolwezi; Likasi; Lodja; Logu; Manono; Matadi; Mbandaka; Mbanza-Ngungu; Mbuji-Mayi; Mwene-Ditu; Muanda; Uvira
Ecobank Congo (EC)	Kinshasa	—
Mining Bank Congo (MBC)	Kinshasa	—
First International Bank (FIBank)	Kinshasa	—
Sofi Banque	Kinshasa	—
La Cruche Banque	Goma	—
Advans Banque Congo	Kinshasa	—
Bank of Africa Congo (BOA)	Kinshasa	—
Banque Gabonaise et Française Internationale (BGFIBank)	Kinshasa	—
United Bank for Africa (UBA)	Kinshasa	—
Byblos Bank Congo	Kinshasa	—

=== Specialized financial institutions ===
The country has several specialized financial institutions (institutions financières spécialisées) created to collect savings and provide financing for targeted sectors. Many of these institutions were state-created to support economic development.

Among the principal specialized institutions are:

- The General Savings Bank of the Congo (Caisse Générale d'Épargne du Congo; CADECO) was founded in June 1950 to encourage savings among Congolese citizens to improve their standard of living. The institution also sought to channel these savings into productive investments that would support economic development. For many years, CADECO successfully mobilized deposits and provided credit services.
- The National Social Security Institute (Institut National de Sécurité Sociale; INSS) was established by Decree-Law of 29 June 1961.
- The National Insurance Company (Société Nationale d'Assurance; SONAS) was established on 23 November 1966 by Ordinance-Law No. 66/622 bis. For many years, it held a state monopoly over the insurance industry. Like the INSS, SONAS mobilizes substantial financial resources that could contribute significantly to financing investment.
- The Development Finance Corporation (Société Financière de Développement; SOFIDE) was established on 9 January 1970 with government support and assistance from the World Bank Group and international financial institutions. Its mission is to promote economic development by providing loans and equity investments for financially viable projects. It focuses on medium- and long-term financing for agricultural, industrial, and commercial development projects. SOFIDE has primarily financed its operations through foreign-currency borrowing from external lenders.
- The National Savings and Housing Credit Fund (Caisse Nationale d'Épargne et de Crédit Immobilier; CNECI) was established in 1971. Its mission is to provide medium- and long-term loans, with or without personal or real collateral, to low-income individuals for the construction, purchase, completion, or expansion of residential housing; promote the establishment of public and private savings and credit institutions to finance housing construction through medium- and long-term lending; receive public savings deposits; and undertake any financial, commercial, movable, immovable, or civil transactions.
- The Industrial Promotion Fund (Fonds de Promotion Industrielle; FPI) was established to finance industrial development. It is funded through parafiscal levies, consisting of taxes imposed on the retail sale of goods produced and/or marketed throughout the country, as well as on imported goods. Under Ordinances No. 89-171 of 7 August 1989 and No. 89-031 of 7 August 1989, the FPI resources were initially treated as government subsidies for ten years (beginning in 1999). After that period, these resources were to be converted into credit facilities, with the conditions for their allocation and repayment determined by the government. Its principal objective is to promote the production of local raw materials for industry, including agricultural and industrial raw materials.

Although many of these institutions experienced financial difficulties during the economic crises of the 1980s and 1990s, they continue to play important roles in development finance, social protection, industrial promotion, and savings mobilization.
