= Isidore Ndaywel è Nziem =

Congolese historian, linguist and university teacher

- Born: 7 February 1944 (age 82)
- Scientific career
- Fields: History
- Institutions: National University of Zaire; School for Advanced Studies in the Social Sciences

Isidore Ndaywel è Nziem (born 7 February 1944, Ipamu), is a Congolese historian and linguist. He is the author of several essays, studies and other publications about the history of the Congo, including the overview work L'histoire générale du Congo: De l'héritage ancien à la République démocratique.

== Life ==
Isidore Ndaywel è Nziem was born in Ipamu in 1944 in modern-day Kwilu Province. He presided over the society of Congolese historians, and teaches history at the Faculty of Letters and Human Sciences at the University of Kinshasa. He taught at the University of Lubumbashi, the Marien Ngouabi University in Brazzaville (from 1977 to 1978) and at the Université Laval in Québec (from 1984 to 1985).

In France, Ndaywel presided over the École des hautes études en sciences sociales (EHESS) from 1993 to 1997 and worked as a researcher at the Centre d'études des mondes africains (CEMAF) of the University of Paris 1 Pantheon-Sorbonne. In Belgium, he is a corresponding member of the Royal Academy of Overseas Sciences.

Ndaywel was the commissioner-general of the fourteenth Francophone summit in Kinshasa. Furthermore, he was the honorary director general of the National Library of the Democratic Republic of Congo.

Ndaywel launched a call to protest against incumbent Congolese president Joseph Kabila who tried to stay in power despite the end of his mandate, together with the committee of catholic laymen with intellectuals such as Jonas Tshiombela, Thierry Nlandu and Léonie Kandolo in December 2017. This call took place on the eve of the signing of the New Year's Eve Agreement on 31 December 2017. Several laymen, priests, and other Catholics responded to the call. The governor of the city of Kinshasa banned these protests. The security forces were deployed in the early morning of 31 December 2017 all throughout Kinshasa, and at least eight protesters died. Ndaywel then went into hiding after rumours circulated of an arrest warrant against him and his colleagues of the committee of laymen.

== Publications ==
=== Essays ===
- La société zaïroise dans le miroir de son discours religieux (1990-1993), Brussels, CEDAF, 1993.
- Histoire du Zaïre : de l’héritage ancien à l’âge contemporain, Louvain-la-Neuve, Duculot, 1997.
- "Du Congo des rébellions au Zaïre des pillages", in Cahiers d'études africaines, vol. 38, booklet 150/152, Disciplines et déchirures : les formes de la violence (1998), p. 417-439, published by EHESS, 1998.
- (ed.), La Constitution de la IIIe République du Congo-Zaïre adoptée par la CNS. 2 vols. (french, lingala, swahili, chiluba and kikongo). Volume I, Paris, L’Harmattan, 2002 (collection "Mémoires lieux de savoir – Archives congolaises").
- Images, mémoires et savoirs : une histoire en partage, Karthala, 2009, 812 p. (with E. Mudimbe-Boyi, preface by Pierre Nora)
- L'université dans le devenir de l'Afrique : un demi-siècle de présence au Congo-Zaïre, preface of Elikia Mbokolo, L'Harmattan, 2007, nb p. 406.
- Les années Lovanium : la première université francophone d'Afrique subsaharienne (Tome 1), L’Harmattan, 2010, nb p. 334.
- Les années Lovanium : la première université francophone d'Afrique subsaharienne (Tome 2), L’Harmattan, 2010, 252 p.
- L'invention du Congo contemporain: Traditions, mémoires, modernités (Tome 1) L’Harmattan, July 2016, nb p. 264.
- L'invention du Congo contemporain: Traditions, mémoires, modernités (Tome 2) L’Harmattan, August 2016, nb p. 294.
- Les années Unaza, Contribution à l'histoire de l'université Africaine Tome 1 Editions l'Harmattan 2018
- Les années Unaza, Contribution à l'histoire de l'université Africaine Tome 2 Editions l'Harmattan 2018

=== Scholarly publications ===
- Histoire générale du Congo : de l’héritage ancien à la République démocratique, Paris, Brussels, De Boeck & Larcier – Département Duculot, 1998.
- "Identité congolaise contemporaine : du prénom écrit au prénomoral", in Figures et paradoxes de l’histoire au Burundi, au Congo et au Rwanda, Congo-Meuse, series Biennale des Archives et Musée de la littérature et du Centre d’étude des littératures belge et congolaise de langue française, tomes 4–5, vol. 2, 2002, p. 766-785.
- Les langues africaines et créoles face à leur avenir, L'Harmattan, 2003, p. 192.
- De l'authenticité à la libération : se prénommer en République démocratique du Congo, University of Kinshasa.
- "Historiographie congolaise", published in Civilisations, 2006, p. 237-254.
- Nouvelle histoire du Congo, Brussels, le Cri, 2009, 744 p.
