= List of banks in the Democratic Republic of the Congo =

This is a list of commercial banks in the Democratic Republic of the Congo, as updated on 1 October 2023 by the Central Bank of the Congo:

== List of commercial banks ==
- Equity Banque Commerciale du Congo (Equity BCDC, heir to the Banque du Congo Belge), part of Equity Group Holdings
- FirstBank DRC SA, part of FirstBank Group
- Citi Group Congo SA, part of Citigroup
- Standard Bank Congo, part of Standard Bank Group
- Rawbank
- Ecobank, part of Ecobank Group
- Trust Merchant Bank (TMB), part of KCB Group
- Afriland First Bank CD SA, part of Afriland First Bank Group
- Access Bank RDC, part of Access Bank Group
- Solidaire Banque SA
- SoFi Bank
- CRDB Bank DR Congo SA, part of CRDB Bank Group
- Bank Of Africa RDC SA (BOA), part of Bank of Africa Group
- United Bank For Africa DRC SA (UBA), part of UBA Group
- BGFibank, part of BGFIBank Group

== Defunct banks ==
1. African Trade Bank (ATB)
2. Bank with Gold Confidence (Bancor)
3. Congolese Bank of Commerce Outside (BCCE)
4. Continental Bank of Congo (BanCoC)
5. Trade and Development Bank (BCD)
6. Bank of Crédit Agricole (BCA)
7. Compagnie Banciare de Commerce et de Credit (COBAC)
8. First Bank Congo Corporation (FBCC)
9. New Bank of Kinshasa (NBK)
10. Ryad Bank (RB)
11. Union of Congolese Banks (UBC)
12. Continental Bank in Zaire (BACAZ)
13. Congolese Bank (BC)
14. Mining Bank of Congo
15. La Cruche Banque

== See also ==
- List of banks in Africa
- List of companies based in the Democratic Republic of the Congo
