= Supercell (mobile network) =

Supercell is a mobile phone network in the North Kivu owned by Supercell SPRL.

Supercell was originally granted a regional 900/1800 GSM-licence for the eastern part of the Congo and started services in July 2002. The concession was later upgraded to cover the whole country, but Supercell operates still a tiny wireless network, limited to Northern Kivu.
