= Association Congolaise des Banques =

The Association Congolaise des Banques (Congolese Banking Association), was created on 22 August 1952. By law No. 003-2002 of 2 February 2002, The Activities and Supervision of Credit Institutions in the Democratic Republic of Congo, Article 86 provides that all credit institutions are required to join the association. Currently, the association's headquarters is in Kinshasa at the regional headquarters of Trust Merchant Bank, and the latter acts as the association's general secretariat.
