= TMK Air Commuter =

Airline of the Democratic Republic of the Congo

| IATA | ICAO | Call sign |
|---|---|---|
| - | TMK | - |
- Founded: 1987
- Ceased operations: 2011
- Hubs: Goma International Airport
- Fleet size: 1
- Destinations: 5
- Headquarters: Goma, Democratic Republic of the Congo
- Website: http://www.tmkcongo.com/aviation.htm

TMK Air Commuter was a regional airline based in Goma, Democratic Republic of the Congo. Its main base is Goma International Airport. As of August 31, 2011, the airline had suspended operations.

== Destinations ==
- Democratic Republic of the Congo
  - Beni - Beni Airport
  - Bunia - Bunia Airport
  - Butembo - Butembo Airport
  - Goma - Goma International Airport Base
- Uganda
  - Entebbe - Entebbe International Airport

== Fleet ==
The TMK Air Commuter fleet includes the following aircraft (as of 25 August 2010):

TMK Air Commuter Fleet
| Aircraft | Total | Orders | Passengers (Economy) | Notes |
|---|---|---|---|---|
| Bombardier Dash 8 Q100 | 1 | 0 | - | |
| De Havilland Canada DHC-6 Twin Otter | 1 | 0 | - | |
| Total | 2 | 0 | | |

== See also ==
- Transport in the Democratic Republic of the Congo
