= Congolese Posts and Telecommunications Corporation =

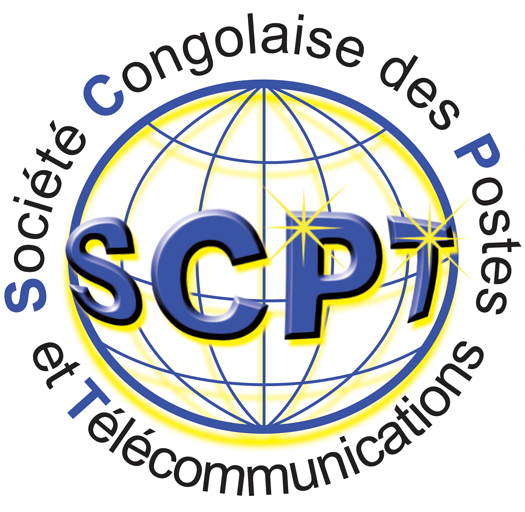
- Industry: Postal services, courier
- Founded: 1 January 1885
- Headquarters: 1009, boulevard du 30 Juin (Hôtel des Postes), Kinshaha, Democratic Republic of the Congo
- Services: Letter post, parcel service, EMS, delivery, Financial services
- Website: scpt.cd

The Congolese Posts and Telecommunications Corporation (French: Société congolaise des postes et télécommunications, pronounced [sɔsjete kɔ̃ɡɔlɛz de pɔst e telekɔmynikasjɔ̃]) is the public operator responsible for postal service in the Democratic Republic of the Congo. Didier Musete assumed the role of general director on 30 March 2021.

== See also ==
- Communications in the Democratic Republic of the Congo
