= Central Bank of the Congo =

Central Bank of Democratic Republic of Congo

Central Bank of the Congo Banque Centrale du Congo

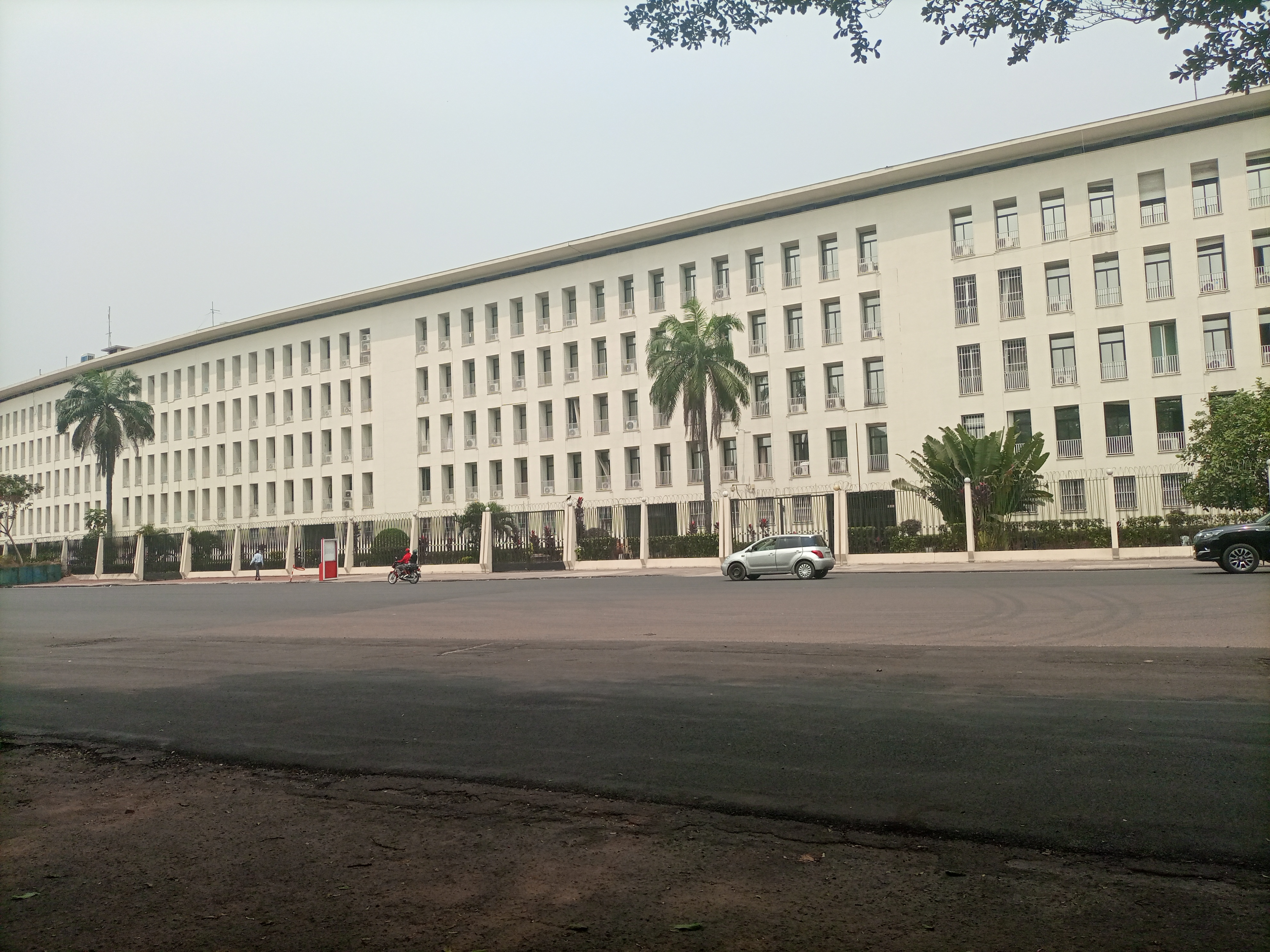
- Seat of the BCC in Gombe, Kinshasa
- Central bank of: Democratic Republic of the Congo
- Headquarters: 563 Bld. Colonel Tshiatshi; Kinshasa, Democratic Republic of the Congo
- Coordinates: 4°18′18″S 15°16′54″E
- Established: 30 July 1951; 75 years ago
- Ownership: 100% state ownership
- Governor: André Wameso Nkwaluloki
- Currency: Congolese franc CDF (ISO 4217)
- Reserves: 770 million USD (2017)
- Preceded by: Banque du Zaïre
- Website: www.bcc.cd

The Central Bank of the Congo (French: Banque Centrale du Congo, Lingala: Ndaku Monene ya Bokéngeli Mbongo ya Mboka Kongo), colloquially known by its acronym BCC, is the central bank of the Democratic Republic of the Congo. Its headquarters are located on Boulevard Colonel Tshatshi in Gombe, Kinshasa, surrounded by significant institutions including the Palais de la Nation, the National Library, and several government ministries.

Established under Law No. 005/2002 of 7 May 2002, the Central Bank of the Congo operates as an independent entity with the legal capacity to engage in contracts, acquire and dispose of property, and participate in legal proceedings. Its capital is wholly owned by the Congolese state, as stipulated in Article 5 of the law. The bank's primary mandate is to define and implement the nation's monetary policy to ensure price stability, as outlined in Article 3. This responsibility includes monitoring price fluctuations in goods and services across the market.

The bank is also engaged in developing policies to promote financial inclusion and is a member of the Alliance for Financial Inclusion. On 5 May 2012 the Central Bank of Congo announced it would be making specific commitments to financial inclusion under the Maya Declaration.

== History ==
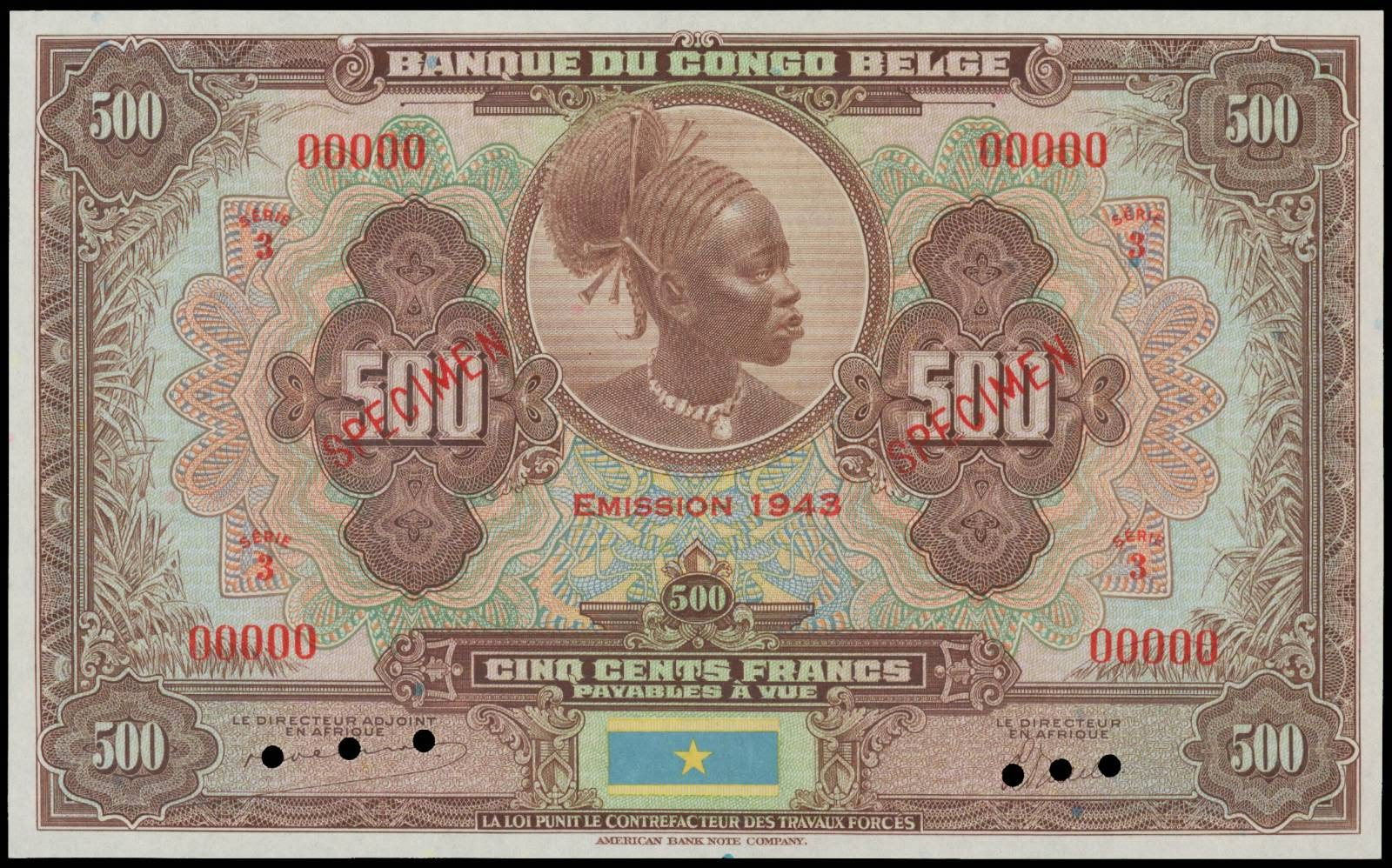
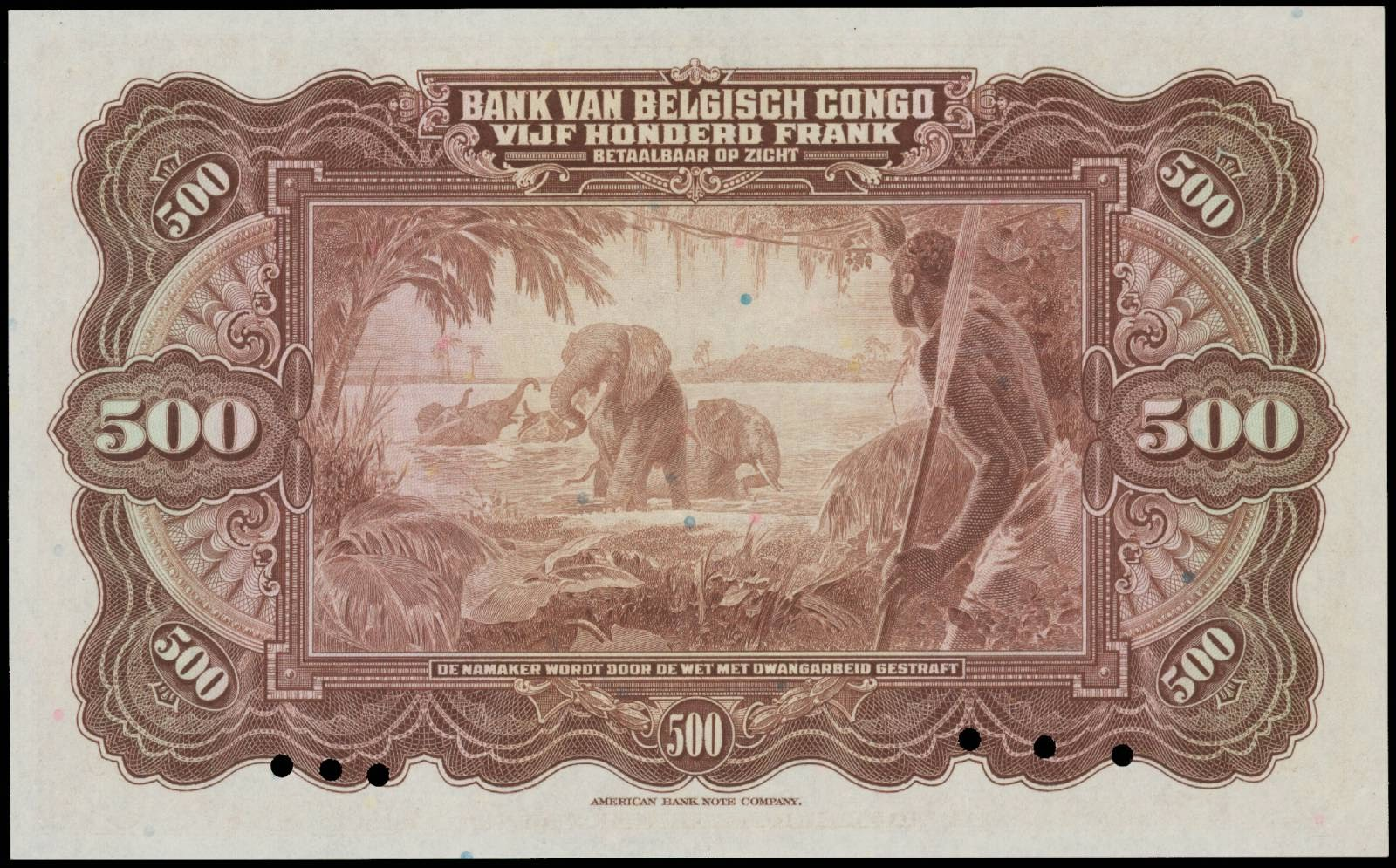
500 francs, issued by the Bank of the Belgian Congo, 1943 (obverse and reverse)

Banking in the Democratic Republic of the Congo began with the establishment of the Banque du Congo Belge in the early 20th century. In 1908, when the territories comprising the Congo Free State were ceded to Belgium, no financial institutions were operating in the colony. Economic reform policies at the time promoted broad commercial freedom, which encouraged discussions among colonial business circles about the potential benefits of establishing a bank. Proponents argued that a bank could serve the needs of major enterprises, particularly the Compagnie du chemin de fer du Congo, and support the development of the Katanga mining region. It was also suggested that such a bank could facilitate economic growth by ensuring the circulation of money throughout the colony. Despite these prospects, most business leaders initially believed that the Belgian Congo offered little room for banking operations.

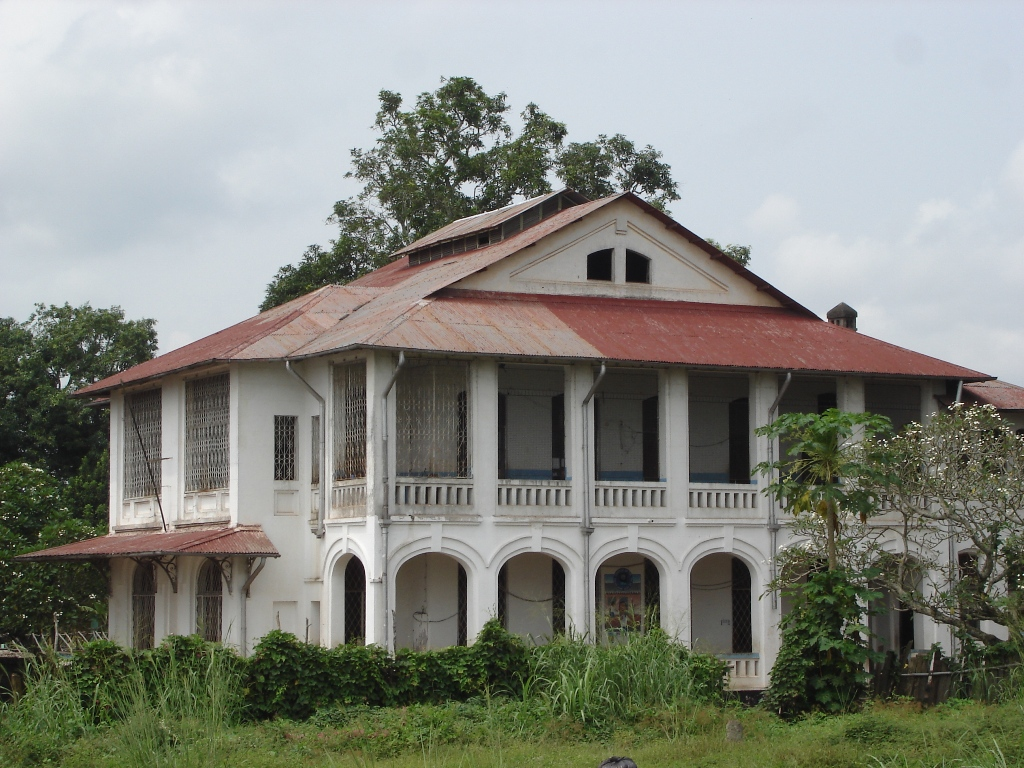
Former building of the Banque du Congo Belge in Coquilhatville (now Mbandaka)

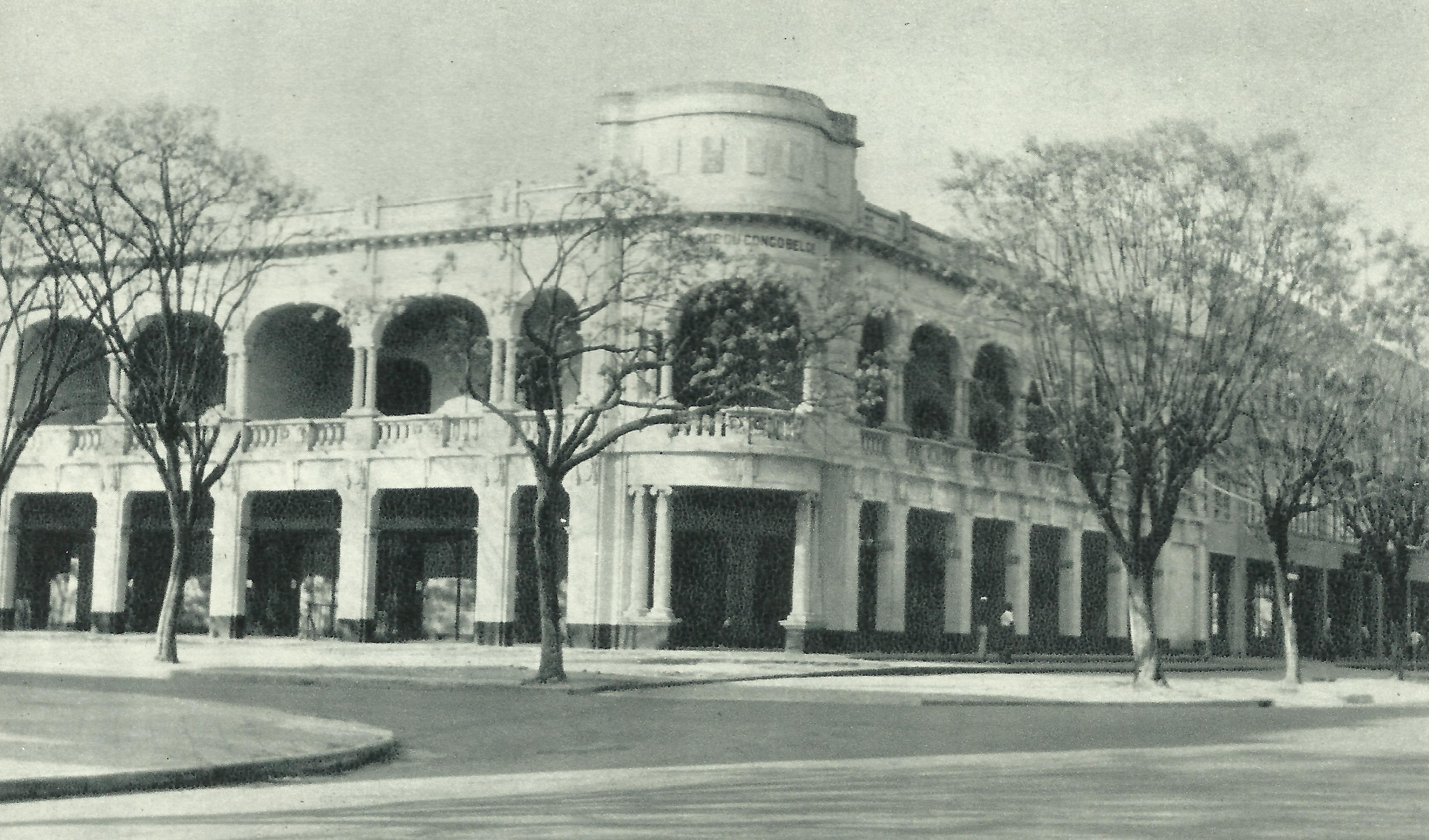
Branch of the Banque du Congo Belge in Elisabethville (now Lubumbashi) in 1926

At the initiative of the directors of Banque d'Outremer, discussions with prominent figures in the Belgian financial sector led to the formal establishment of the Banque du Congo Belge on 11 January 1909 as a joint-stock company under Belgian law. The bank began operations with only three employees, gradually expanding into the main economic centers and promoting the circulation of state-issued currency. Its first branch opened in Matadi on 1 June 1909, which was already a "relatively active commercial center, home to the country's main port and a strong customer base from the Compagnie du chemin de fer du Congo". On 28 October 1909, another branch was inaugurated in Elisabethville (present-day Lubumbashi), serving clients such as the Union Minière du Haut-Katanga, local labor recruiters, and merchants from neighboring Rhodesia. The Léopoldville branch (now Kinshasa) opened on 1 August 1910, benefiting from the colony's free-trade system and the new cash payment regulations introduced on 1 July of the same year. In accordance with its later mandate as an issuing institution and colonial cashier, additional branches were established in Boma on 1 October 1911 and Stanleyville (now Kisangani) on 1 January 1912. By 1912, the bank had grown to 25 employees and managed approximately 1,800 accounts.

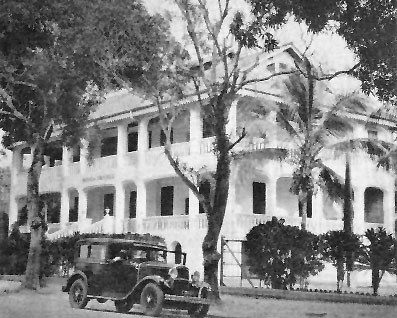
Head office of the Banque du Congo Belge in Léopoldville (now Kinshasa), photographed in 1942

During the First World War (1914–1918), banking activities in the Belgian Congo were initially disrupted due to uncertainties and the severance of ties with the bank's headquarters in Brussels. However, the Banque du Congo Belge adapted effectively and opened branches in district capitals to manage government accounting services and consolidating its role as an essential instrument for the colony's economic development. The bank successfully weathered the post-war deflation of 1920 and the global economic depression that followed in 1929. During this period, exports such as rubber, copal, palm oil, ivory, and copper benefited from reduced competition in European markets and new opportunities in America and Japan. This supported overall economic growth and increasing banking activity. The price of copper from the Union Minière du Haut-Katanga increased, while government infrastructure spending and rising consumer purchasing power further boosted the banking sector.

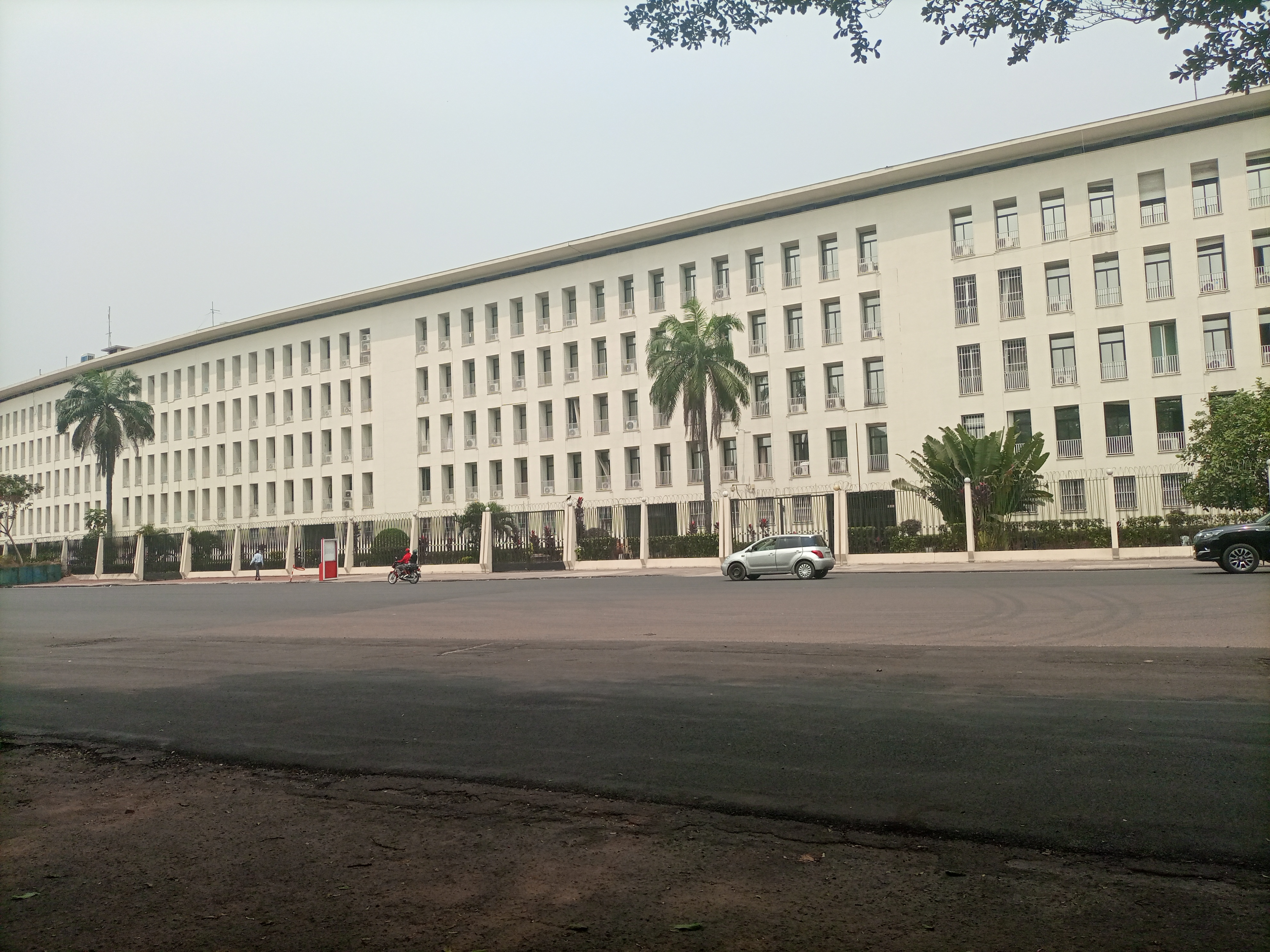
Headquarters of the Central Bank of the Congo, Gombe, Kinshasa

From its early years, the Banque du Congo Belge negotiated with the Colonial Department to secure the privilege of issuing currency. Pursuant to a convention of 7 July 1911, approved by decree on 18 July, the bank was granted a 25-year authorization to issue banknotes under specific conditions: capital was increased from 3 to 5 million Congolese francs, with at least 20% paid up; two new branches were to be opened, one in Boma and another in Stanleyville (Kisangani); the bank's corporate purpose was revised to limit its activities strictly to those permitted by the convention; profits were to be shared with the colony, with half allocated to the government after reserving 5% and deducting an amount equal to 6% of the paid-up capital; operations were to be supervised by a Government Commissioner; and the bank agreed to manage the colony's cash and treasury services in its branches and agencies under a special agreement also dated 7 July 1911. Banknotes could be issued in Matadi, Léopoldville, Elisabethville, or in any other "branches or agencies designated with the agreement of the Minister of Colonies, provided that the number of issuing centers did not exceed six". The decree of 27 July 1935 reaffirmed the bank's exclusive privilege to issue both banknotes and metallic currency, previously reserved for the colonial government, and coins issued by the Congo Free State were gradually replaced by the Congolese franc. The issuance privilege was extended until 30 June 1952. According to these agreements, the Banque du Congo Belge could propose to the Government, within the prescribed deadlines, a review of the "issuance charter". However, as the expiration date of this convention approached, the question arose whether the issuance privilege should continue to be granted to a private bank.

The Central Bank of the Congo was formally established on 30 July 1951 as the Central Bank of the Belgian Congo and Rwanda-Urundi (Banque Centrale du Congo Belge et du Ruanda-Urundi; BCCBRU). This institution served as the issuing authority for Belgian Congo and Rwanda-Urundi, which were then Belgian colonies. Following the independence of the First Congolese Republic in 1960, an agreement reached in Geneva later that year laid the groundwork for the dissolution of the BCCBRU and the creation of two separate central banks—one for the newly independent Congo and the other for Rwanda-Urundi. On 3 October 1960, a law decree established the Monetary Council of the Republic of Congo (Conseil Monétaire de la République du Congo), tasked with drafting proposals for a new central bank and financial system suited to the country's post-independence needs.

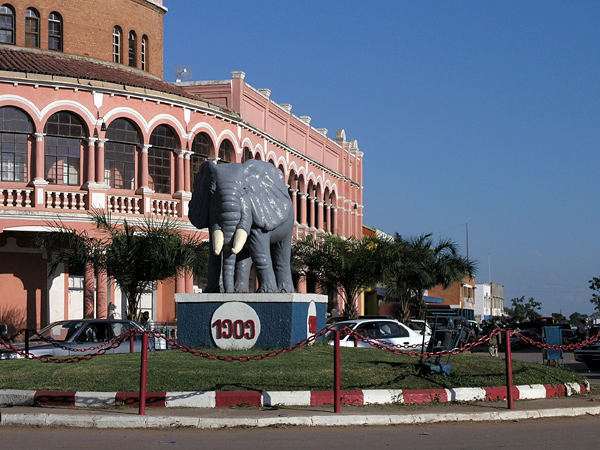
Elephant monument at the branch of BCC in Lubumbashi

On 16 February 1961, the Belgo-Congolese Convention regarding the liquidation of the BCCBRU was ratified in Brazzaville, and shortly thereafter, on 23 February 1961, the National Bank of the Congo (Banque Nationale du Congo; BNC) was officially created under a law decree. However, the Monetary Council temporarily assumed the bank's responsibilities until 22 June 1964, when the BNC formally began operations. Following the name change of the country to Zaire in 1971, the BNC was renamed the National Bank of Zaire (Banque Nationale du Zaïre; BNZ) by service order No. 218 on 4 November 1971. This was quickly amended by service order No. 219 on 25 November 1971, transforming the institution into the Bank of Zaire (Banque du Zaïre; BZ).

In 1997, following the political shift that led to the overthrow of Mobutu Sese Seko's regime and the country's renaming back to the Democratic Republic of the Congo, the Bank of Zaire was transformed into the National Bank of Congo (Banque Nationale du Congo; BNC) once again. In 2002, the institution was restructured and rebranded as the Central Bank of the Congo (Banque Centrale du Congo; BCC). Throughout these transitions, the country's currency has undergone several changes: from the Congolese franc inherited from the colonial period to the zaïre in 1967, followed by the new zaïre in 1993, and ultimately returning to the Congolese franc in 1998.

== Organization ==
=== Core functions ===
According to Law No. 005/2002 of 7 May 2002, governing the establishment, organization, and operation of the BCC, Article 1 defines the BCC as a public-law institution possessing legal personality. This status grants it the authority to enter into contracts, resolve disputes, make settlements, engage in legal proceedings, and acquire or dispose of property. Article 5 further specifies that the bank's capital is wholly owned by the Congolese state. Under this same law, the BCC is entrusted with several key missions:

- Implement the country's monetary policy, the main objective of which is to ensure the stability of the general price level, which thus provides the internal and external stability of the national currency;
- Hold and manage the official reserves of the Republic;
- Issue standards and regulations regarding foreign exchange operations;
- Participate in the negotiation of any international agreement involving payment arrangements and ensure its implementation;
- Develop regulations and supervise credit institutions, microfinance institutions, and other financial intermediaries;
- Promote the proper functioning of clearing and payment systems;
- Promote the development of money and capital markets.

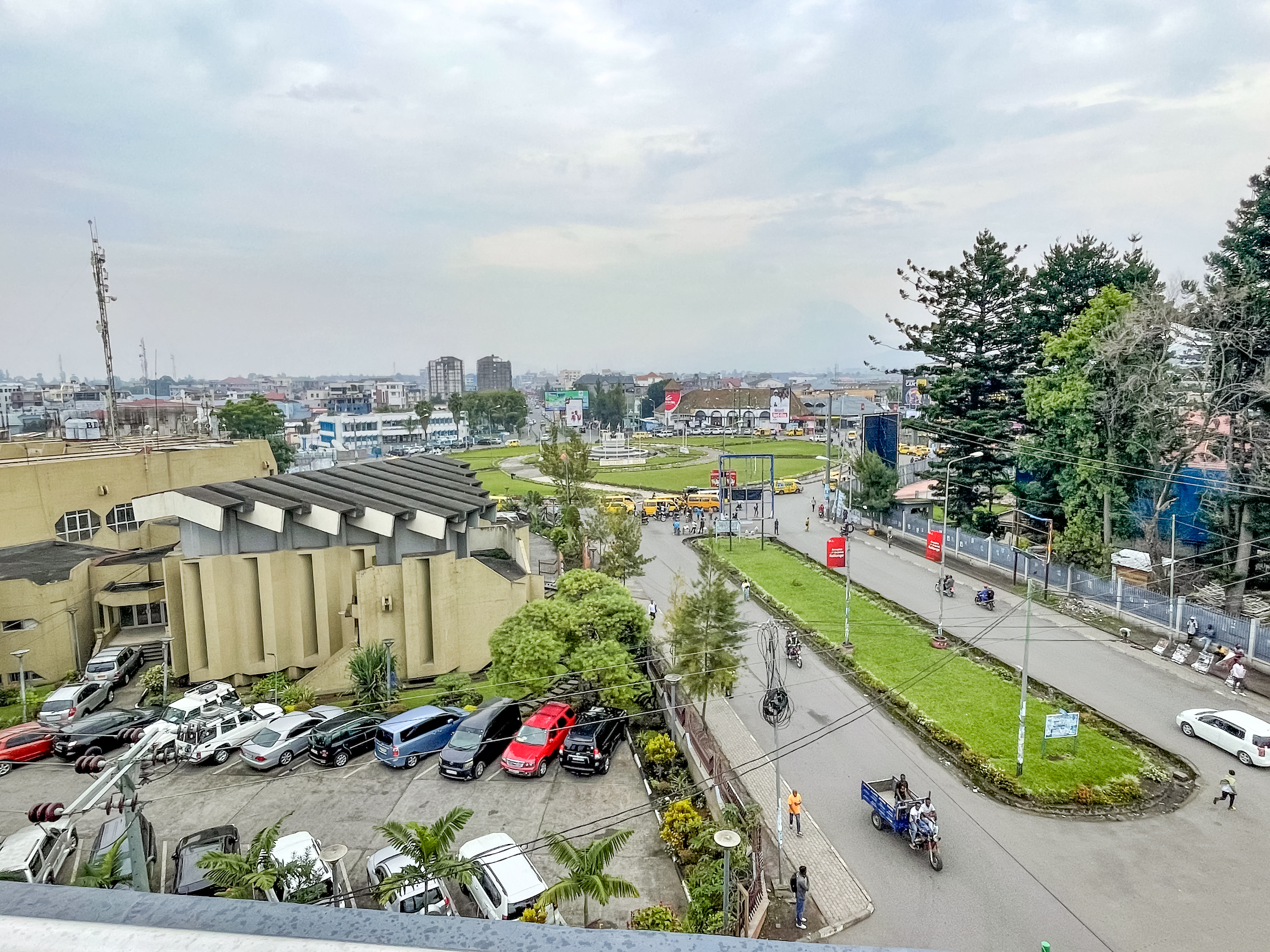
Aerial view of the Banks Roundabout, popularly known as BDGL, one of Goma's landmarks.

==== Main objectives ====
The BCC is tasked with formulating and implementing the country's monetary policy, with the primary objective of ensuring the stability of the general price level. It exercises full independence in the execution of this mission, as provided by Article 3 of its governing law. In this context, the BCC closely monitors price fluctuations of goods and services within the market. While upholding its primary mandate of price stability, the bank also carries out the full range of functions typical of a central bank, including the following:

- Issuing institution:
  - The BCC alone is authorized, within the national territory, to issue banknotes and coins with legal tender status, denominated in the monetary unit of the Democratic Republic of the Congo — the Congolese franc — or its subdivisions. It is responsible for maintaining the internal and external stability of the national currency.
- Bank of banks:
  - The BCC supervises the banking system and oversees the distribution of credit by banking and non-banking financial institutions.
- State cashier:
  - Acting under the agreement that governs state cashier services, the BCC manages the republic's financial transactions, executing payments on behalf of the state. Where it lacks direct representation, it may delegate this function to accredited financial institutions. The bank also administers public debt and special government accounts in coordination with relevant ministries. Additionally, it handles the purchase, sale, transfer, collection, and safekeeping of checks, securities, and other financial instruments on behalf of the state, as well as collects any proceeds arising from such holdings.
- Advisor to the state:
  - As the government's advisor on economic, monetary, and financial matters, the BCC may, either on its own initiative or at the government's request, issue opinions or provide advice on any policy or measure the government intends to adopt.
- Manager of the republic's Official Gold and Foreign Exchange Reserves:
  - The BCC holds and manages the gold and foreign currency reserves of the Democratic Republic of the Congo.
- Supervisor of financial intermediaries:
- The BCC is responsible for developing regulations and supervising credit institutions, microfinance institutions, and other financial intermediaries.

=== Governance structure ===
According to Article 17 of its founding law, the BCC operates under several governing bodies. The Bank Council is responsible for overseeing the institution's overall activities. The governor directs the bank, serving as its legal and administrative representative, and is authorized to sign banknotes, securities, official reports, contracts, and personnel-related documents, as well as to represent the institution in legal matters. The vice-governor supports the governor, carrying out delegated duties and assuming the governor's role in cases of absence or incapacity. Oversight responsibilities are also entrusted to the board of auditors, while the executive management office is composed of the governor's and vice-governor's advisors and expert consultants.

=== Operational structure ===
==== Directorates ====
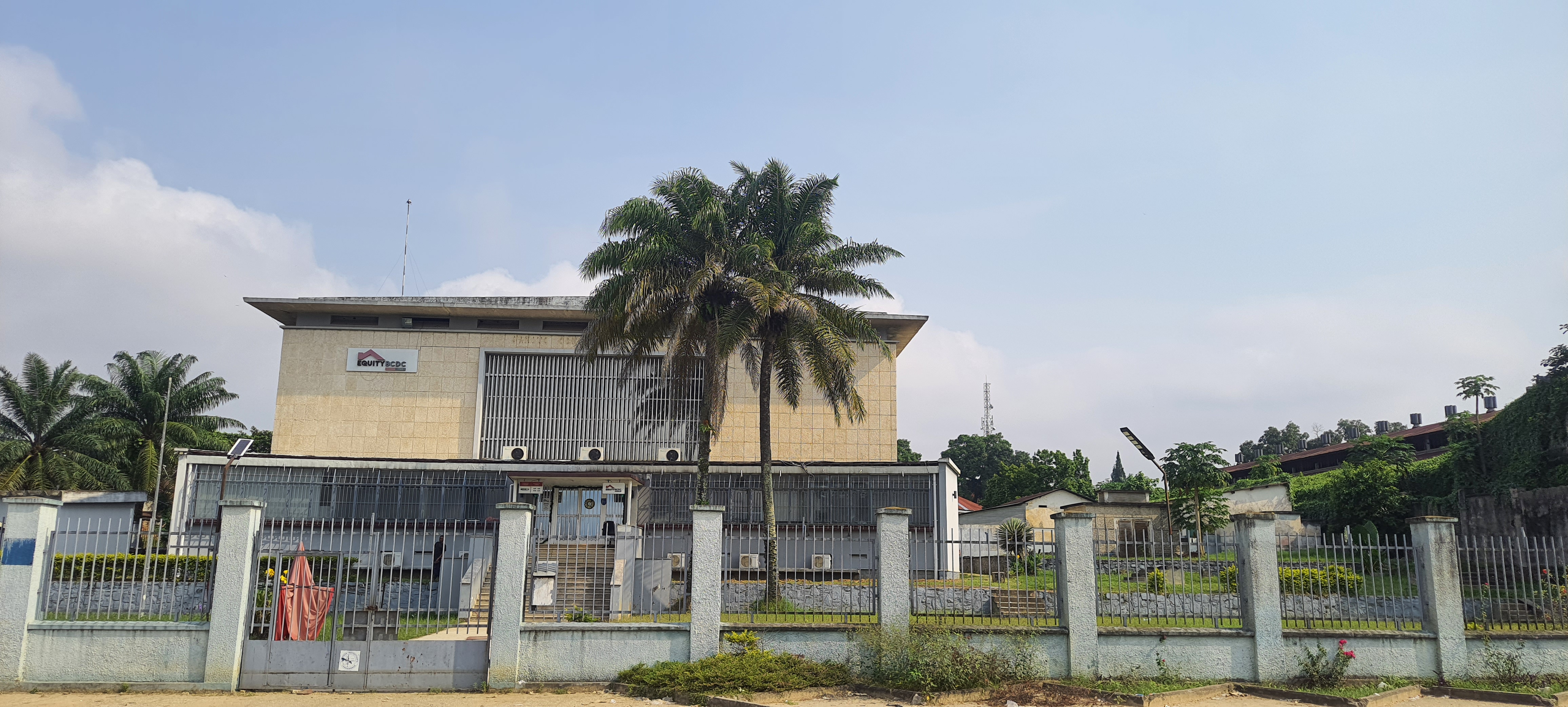
BCC of Kisangani

According to Service Order No. 075/09 of 12 June 2009, the BCC comprises the following general directorates at its headquarters:

- General directorate of monetary policy and banking operations
  - Directorate of Economic Analysis
  - Directorate of Statistics
  - Directorate of Markets and Banking Operations
  - Directorate of Treasury
- General directorate of administration and technical services
  - Directorate of General Administration
  - Directorate of Information Technology
  - Directorate of Human Resources
  - Directorate of Accounting and Budget
  - Sub-Directorate of Procurement
- Autonomous structures
  - Internal Audit
  - Change Management Directorate
  - Legal Directorate
  - Directorate of Supervision of Financial Intermediaries
  - Provincial Directorates
  - Secretariat for Provincial Coordination Support
  - Brussels Representative Office
- Provincial directorates
  - The bank maintains eight provincial offices in Goma, Bandundu, Boma, Bukavu, Kananga, Kisangani, Lubumbashi, Mbandaka, and Mbuji-Mayi. In cities where the central bank is not present, a commercial bank can be appointed to represent it; Trust Merchant Bank performs such a role in Likasi and Kolwezi.
- Autonomous agencies
  - Independent agencies are located in Kikwit, Matadi, Ilebo, Tshikapa, Kamina, and Kasumbalesa.
- Independent units
  - Certain units operate outside the directorates, including:
    - Sub-Directorate of Security
    - Committee for Active Financial Investments
    - Secretariat for Coordination of International and Regional Cooperation
    - Brussels Representative Office
    - Secretariat for Provincial Coordination Support
    - Health Center
    - Mint Hospital

== See also ==
- List of central banks
- List of financial supervisory authorities by country

== Sources ==
- Banque du Congo belge. 1959. Banque du Congo belge, 1909-1959. Bruxelles, Editions L. Cuypers
