= Trust Merchant Bank =

Trust Merchant Bank (TMB)
- Company type: Private
- Industry: Banking
- Founded: 2004
- Headquarters: 1223 Avenue Lumumba, Lubumbashi, Democratic Republic of Congo
- Products: Loans, checking, savings, debit cards, credit cards, mobile banking, leasing, online banking, trade finance, remote salary payments
- Revenue: US$114 million (2022)
- Net income: US$19 million (2022)
- Total assets: US$1.7 billion (2022)
- Number of employees: 1,700+
- Website: www.tmb.cd

Trust Merchant Bank or TMB, is a commercial bank based in the Democratic Republic of Congo (DRC), with its headquarters located in Lubumbashi. The bank began operations in 2004. TMB operates in all sectors of the local banking market, including in retail banking, SME banking, corporate banking, and mobile banking.

The bank is regulated by the Central Bank of Congo and is a member of the Association Congolaise des Banques.

== Overview ==
Trust Merchant Bank is one of the DRC's largest banks as measured by regulatory equity, total assets and turnover. As of 31 December 2022, total assets were in excess of US$1.7 billion, equivalent to approximately 12 percent of total bank assets in the DRC. TMB is a member of the SWIFT interbank network (TRMSCD3L) and is also a principal member of MasterCard, and Visa.

== Bank characteristics ==
Trust Merchant Bank has several unique characteristics:

- TMB was the first Congolese financial institution to launch a proprietary mobile banking service.
- TMB is the only bank to offer a nationwide branch network.
- It is the only bank headquartered in a city other than the national capital, Kinshasa.
- The bank was the first Congolese bank to secure a licence to open a representative office in Brussels.

== Branch Network ==
Trust Merchant Bank operates over 105 branches across 21 provinces of the Democratic Republic of Congo:

- Bandundu-Ville
- Beni
- Boma
- Bukavu (multiple branches)
- Bunia
- Butembo
- Fungurume
- Gbadolite
- Gemena
- Goma (multiple branches)
- Kabinda
- Kalemie
- Kamina
- Kamoa
- Kananga
- Kasumbalesa (multiple branches)
- Kenge
- Kikwit
- Kilwa
- Kindu
- Kinshasa (multiple branches)
- Kitona
- Kisangani
- Kolwezi (multiple branches)
- Likasi
- Lodja
- Logu
- Lubumbashi (multiple branches)
- Manono
- Matadi (multiple branches)
- Mbandaka
- Mbanza Ngundu
- Mbuji-Mayi
- Mwene-Ditu
- Muanda
- Uvira

The bank maintains a representative office in Brussels.

TMB is the only bank in the DRC to operate bank branches onsite at a number of MONUSCO sites across the country, including in Kisangani and Bunia.

== Awards ==
The African Banker named TMB as the Best Bank in Central Africa in 2014, 2017, and again in 2023. TMB was named as Bank of the Year Democratic Republic of Congo in 2012, 2013, 2014, 2015, 2017, 2018, 2019, 2021, and 2023 by The Banker. EMEA Finance awarded TMB the title Best Bank in the Democratic Republic of Congo for the thirteenth consecutive year in 2023.

In 2014, 2015, 2016, 2020 and 2022, Global Finance Magazine recognised TMB as the Best Bank in the Democratic Republic of Congo.

== Le Monde des Flamboyants ==
TMB's regional headquarters in Kinshasa plays host to Le Monde des Flamboyants, a multi-purpose exhibition gallery.

== Acquisition by KCB Group ==
In August 2022, KCB Group, based in Nairobi, Kenya agreed to acquire 85 percent shareholding in Trust Merchant Bank at "1.49 times the book value". It is estimated that that would cost approximately KSh15 billion/= (US$127 million then). KCB also agreed to acquire the remaining 15 percent ownership in the bank, not later than 2024. The deal requires shareholder and regulatory approvals in DRCongo and Kenya.

== See also ==
- List of banks in the Democratic Republic of the Congo
