= National Library of the Democratic Republic of Congo =

National library of the Democratic Republic of the Congo

- Bibliotheque Nationale de la Republique Democratique du Congo
- 4.304125629604195°S 15.28307406465234°E
- Location: 10 Boulevard Colonel Tshatshi, Kinshasa, Democratic Republic of the Congo
- Established: 1974
- Reference to legal mandate: Act No. 74-002

Collection
- Size: 1.2m books 7,500 photographs, 175 periodicals
- Legal deposit: yes

Other information
- Director: Professor Georges Mulumba Kalonga

National Library of the Democratic Republic of Congo (French: Bibliothèque Nationale de la République démocratique du Congo) is located in Kinshasa and was established in 1974 as an office within Ministry of Culture and Arts. In 1989, it became autonomous under presidential order.

In 2009, the Library received a $14,880 initiative from the Model United Nations of the University of Chicago and UNESCO to modernize facilities, train staff members and purchase new technology and materials. Although the library contains over seven thousand historical photographs of the political and cultural history of the country, only 25% have been scanned due to a lack of resources.

== See also ==
- Bibliothèque de l'université de Kinshasa
- Centre de documentation de l'enseignement supérieur, universitaire et de la recherche à Kinshasa

== Bibliography ==
- Marcel Lajeunesse, ed. (2008). "République démocratique du Congo". Les Bibliothèques nationales de la francophonie (PDF) (in French) (3rd ed.). Bibliothèque et Archives nationales du Québec. OCLC 401164333.
