= Rawbank =

Commercial bank in the Democratic Republic of the Congo

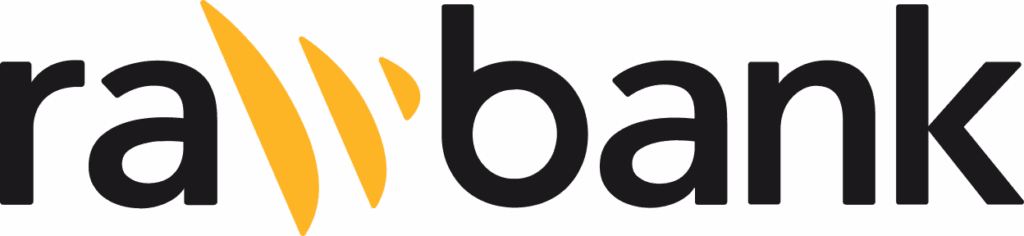

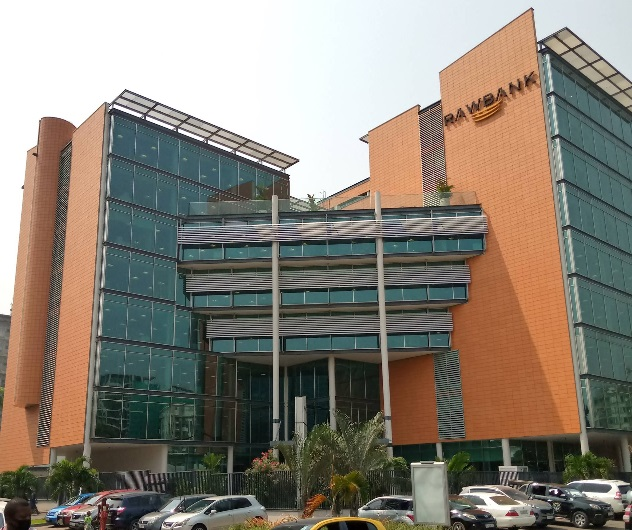
- Rawbank Headquarters in Kinshasa
- Type: Private bank
- Industry: Financial services
- Founded: 2002; 24 years ago
- Headquarters: Kinshasa, Democratic Republic of the Congo
- Key people: Isabelle Lessedjina (Chairman); Mustafa Rawji (CEO)
- Products: Corporate, SME, retail lending, transaction banking, savings, investments, syndications
- Revenue: US$487 million (2023)
- Total assets: US$4.9 billion (December 2022)
- Number of employees: 1,800+ (2022)
- Parent: Rawji Group of Companies
- Website: rawbank.com

Rawbank is a regulated financial institution based in the Democratic Republic of the Congo (DRC). The bank was created on 2 May 2002, and has grown to become the DRC's largest universal bank with total assets of US$4.9 billion as of December 2023.

As of 2022, the bank had over 1,800 employees, and serviced over 500,000 corporate, SME, and retail clients through its network of 110 branches, 500+ ATM's, as well as its digital banking platforms and applications.

== History ==
Rawbank was launched in 2002 by the Rawji family, which have a diversified set of business interests in the Democratic Rep. of Congo, that is commonly called Rawji Group. The family traces its roots in the DRC since 1902, and is owned by the Rawji brothers, namely Mushtaque, Zahir, Mazhar, Aslam and Murtaza. The history of the Rawji group begins at the beginning of the 20th century, when Merali Rawji (father of the Mushtaque siblings) settled in Kindu, then in Kalemie and later in Kisangani, in the eastern part of what was then the Belgian Congo. The family was initially heavily involved in the coffee and cocoa trading, which was a predominant export from Eastern Congo. In 1966, the family acquired Beltexco, a textile products distribution entity which had a national presence.

== Operations ==
Its five-year strategy is centered on a digital-first strategy, to ensure it meets its targets of financial inclusion to the underserved population of the DRC.

As of March 20202, Rawbank was the largest commercial bank in DR Congo, with 34 percent of banking assets in the country and a base of nearly 500,000 clients. Rawbank was the first financial house in DR Congo to offer mortgages to the public in 2015. Rawbank offers specifically adapted products and services for each of its market segments, as well as providing the latest technologies for its clients. With the advent of mobile wallets, Rawbank launched IllicoCash, a fast growing mobile payments and digital banking application in the DRC market enabling financial inclusion in urban and rural areas.

Rawbank has a unique program named Lady's First, a program dedicated to supporting women in business by providing tailor made training, mentoring groups, and financial capabilities in order to scale businesses managed by women. This program supports the growth of women-led SME's but also has created partnerships with micro-finance institutions that are dedicated to gender empowerment for those that are the bottom of the pyramid.

Rawbank's international financial partners include the International Finance Corporation, Trade Development Bank, African Export-Import Bank, Arab Bank for Economic Development, and African Development Bank.

== Branch Network ==
As at the end of 2021, Rawbank operated 110 branches (includes branches and sub-branches), across the Democratic Republic of Congo.

== See also ==
- List of banks in the Democratic Republic of the Congo
