= Tshiluba language =

Bantu language spoken in DR Congo

Tshiluba, Ciluba
- Cilubà
- Native to: Democratic Republic of the Congo, Angola
- Region: Kasai: Kasai-Occidental; Kasai-Oriental
- Ethnicity: Baluba (Luba, Bena Kasai)
- Native speakers: 15 million (2024)
- Language family: Niger–Congo?: Atlantic–Congo; Volta-Congo; Benue–Congo; Bantoid; Southern Bantoid; Bantu; Luban; Luba languages; Tshiluba, Ciluba
- Dialects: Ciluba-Lubilanji/Cena-Lubilanji (in Mbuji-Mayi, Kinshasa as well as Tshilenge district, and western Gandajika territory); Cena-Lulua (in Kananga, central-northern Lulua district, and eastern Luebo territory); Cikwa-Nyambi (in Northern Kamonia territory & Tshikapa); Cikwa-Luntu (in Dimbelenge territory)
- Writing system: Latin script Mandombe script

Official status
- Official language in: Democratic Republic of Congo (national language)

Language codes
- ISO 639-2: lua
- ISO 639-3: lua
- Glottolog: luba1249
- Guthrie code: L.31
- Location of speakers: Tshiluba Luba-Katanga

Pidgin Chiluba
- Native to: DR Congo
- Native speakers: None
- Language family: Luba-based pidgin

Language codes
- ISO 639-3: None (mis)
- Glottolog: None
- Guthrie code: L.30A

Tshiluba, known as Cilubà in the official orthography, (Note: The prefix tshi or ci, depending on the spelling used, is used for the noun class used with language names) and also known as Luba-Kasai and Luba-Lulua, (Note: "Luba-Lulua" combines the name "Luba" (in the strictest sense, Luba Lubilanji people) and "Lulua" (Beena Luluwa people), as in "the Luba-Lulua conflict". Ethnologue.com also indicates the name "Beena Lulua" but that is the name of the Beena Luluwa people, or the name "Luva" but that is a synonym of Kiluba (Kiluva), a different Luban language, which has a fricative bilabial between vowels.) is a Bantu language (Zone L) of Central Africa and a national language of the Democratic Republic of the Congo, alongside Lingala, Swahili, and Kikongo ya leta.

An eastern dialect is spoken by the Luba people of the East Kasai Region and a western dialect by the Lulua people of the West Kasai Region. The total number of speakers was estimated at 6.3 million in 1991.

Within the Zone L Bantu languages, Tshiluba is one of a group of languages which form the "Luba" group, together with Kaonde (L40), Kete (L20), Kanyok, Luba-Katanga (Kiluba), Sanga, Zela and Bangubangu. The L20, L30 and L60 languages are also grouped as the Luban languages within Zone L Bantu.

== Geographic distribution and dialects ==
Tshiluba is chiefly spoken in a large area in the Kasaï Occidental and Kasaï Oriental provinces of the Democratic Republic of the Congo. However, the differences in Tshiluba within the area are minor, consisting mostly of differences in tones and vocabulary, and speakers easily understand one another. Both dialects have subdialects.

Additionally, there is also a pidginised variety of Tshiluba, especially in cities, where the everyday spoken Tshiluba is enriched with French words and even words from other languages, such as Lingala or Swahili. Nevertheless, it is not a typical form of a pidgin since it is not common to everyone but changes its morphology and the quantity and degree to which words from other languages are used. Its form changes depending on who speaks it and varies from city to city and social class to social class. However, people generally speak the regular Tshiluba language in their daily lives, rather than pidgin.

The failure of the language to be taught at school has resulted in the replacement of native words by French words for the most part. For instance, people speaking generally count in French, rather than Tshiluba. The situation of French and Tshiluba being used simultaneously made linguists mistakenly think that the language had been pidginised.

== Vocabulary ==
| Western dialects | Eastern dialects | English |
|---|---|---|
| meme | mema | me |
| ne | ni | with |
| nzolo/nsolo | nzolu | chicken |
| bionso | bionsu | everything |
| luepu | mukela (e) | salt |
| kapia | mudilu | fire |
| bidia | nshima | maize meal |
| makelela | malaba | yesterday/ tomorrow |
| lupepe | luhepa | wind |
| Mankaji (shi)/tatu mukaji | tatu mukaji | aunty |
| bimpe | bimpa | well/good |

== Alphabet ==
Tshiluba uses the Latin alphabet, with the digraphs ⟨ng⟩, ⟨ny⟩ and ⟨sh⟩ but without the letters ⟨q⟩, ⟨r⟩ and ⟨x⟩: The former trigraph ⟨tsh⟩ has been replaced with the letter ⟨c⟩.

== Phonology ==
Tshiluba has a 5 vowel system with vowel length:

| | Front | Central | Back |
|---|---|---|---|
| Close | i iː | | u uː |
| Mid | e eː | | o oː |
| Open | | a aː | |

The chart shows the consonants of Tshiluba.

| | | Bilabial | Labio- dental | Alveolar | Post-alv./ Palatal | Velar | Glottal |
|---|---|---|---|---|---|---|---|
| Stop/ Affricate | voiceless | p | | t | tʃ | k | |
| Stop/ Affricate | voiced | b | | d | | | |
| Stop/ Affricate | vl. prenasal | ᵐp | | ⁿt | ⁿtʃ | ᵑk | |
| Stop/ Affricate | vd. prenasal | ᵐb | | ⁿd | | | |
| Fricative | voiceless | (ɸ) | f | s | ʃ | | h |
| Fricative | voiced | | v | z | ʒ | | |
| Fricative | vl. prenasal | | ᶬf | ⁿs | ⁿʃ | | |
| Fricative | vd. prenasal | | ᶬv | ⁿz | ⁿʒ | | |
| Nasal | | m | | n | ɲ | ŋ | |
| Approximant | | | | l | j | w | |

- /p/ may also have the sound [ɸ].
- If a /d/ is preceding an /i/, it may also be pronounced as an affricate sound [dʒ].

== Sample text ==
According to The Rosetta Project, Article 1 of the Universal Declaration of Human Rights translates to:

Bantu bonsu badi baledibwa badikadile ne badi ne makokeshi amwe. Badi ne lungenyi lwa bumuntu ne kondo ka moyo, badi ne bwa kwenzelangana malu mu buwetu.
"All human beings are born free and equal in dignity and rights. They are endowed with reason and conscience and should act towards one another in a spirit of brotherhood."

According to Learn Tshiluba (Mofeko):

Mukayi wuani udi mu bujimi
"My wife is on the farm"

Mulunda wanyi mujikija kalasa Uenda mu tshidimu tshishala
"My friend completed his/her studies last year"

== Bibliography ==
- Stappers, Leo. Tonologische bijdrage tot de studie van het werkwoord in het tshiluba. 1949. Mémoires (Institut royal colonial belge. Section des sciences morales et politiques). Collection in-8^{o}; t. 18, fasc. 4.
- de Schryver, Gilles-Maurice. Cilubà Phonetics: Proposals for a 'Corpus-Based Phonetics from Below' Approach. 1999. Research Centre of African Languages and Literatures, University of Ghent.
- DeClercq, P. Grammaire de la langue des bena-lulua. 1897. Polleunis et Ceuterick.
- Muyunga, Yacioko Kasengulu. 1979. Lingala and Ciluba speech audiometry. Kinshasa: Presses Universitaires du Zaïre pour l'Université Nationale du Zaïre (UNAZA).
- Kabuta, Ngo. Loanwords in Cilubà. 2012. University of Ghent, Belgium.
- Willems, Em. Het Tshiluba van Kasayi voor beginnelingen. 1943. Sint Norbertus.
