= Languages of the Democratic Republic of the Congo =

- Map showing the distribution of the four national languages in the Congo
- Official: French
- National: Kituba, Lingala, Swahili and Tshiluba
- Indigenous: More than 200
- Signed: American Sign Language (Francophone African Sign Language)
- Keyboard layout: French AZERTY
- Lingua franca: French, Kikongo ya leta, Lingala, Swahili and Tshiluba

The Democratic Republic of the Congo is a multilingual country where an estimated total of 242 languages are spoken. The publication Ethnologue lists 215 living languages. The official language, since the colonial period, is French, one of the languages of Belgium. Four other languages, all of them Bantu based, have the status of national language: Kikongo-Kituba, Lingala, Swahili and Tshiluba.

The DRC is a Francophone country, where, as of 2024, 55.393 million (50.69%) out of 109.276 million people speak French. In fact, 74% of the population use French as a lingua franca, showing that many speak it as a second or third language, even if they are not fully proficient.

In 2024, there were over 12 million native French speakers, or around 12% of the population.

When the country was a Belgian colony, it had already instituted teaching and use of the four national languages in primary schools, making it one of the few African nations to have had literacy in local languages during the European colonial period.

== French ==
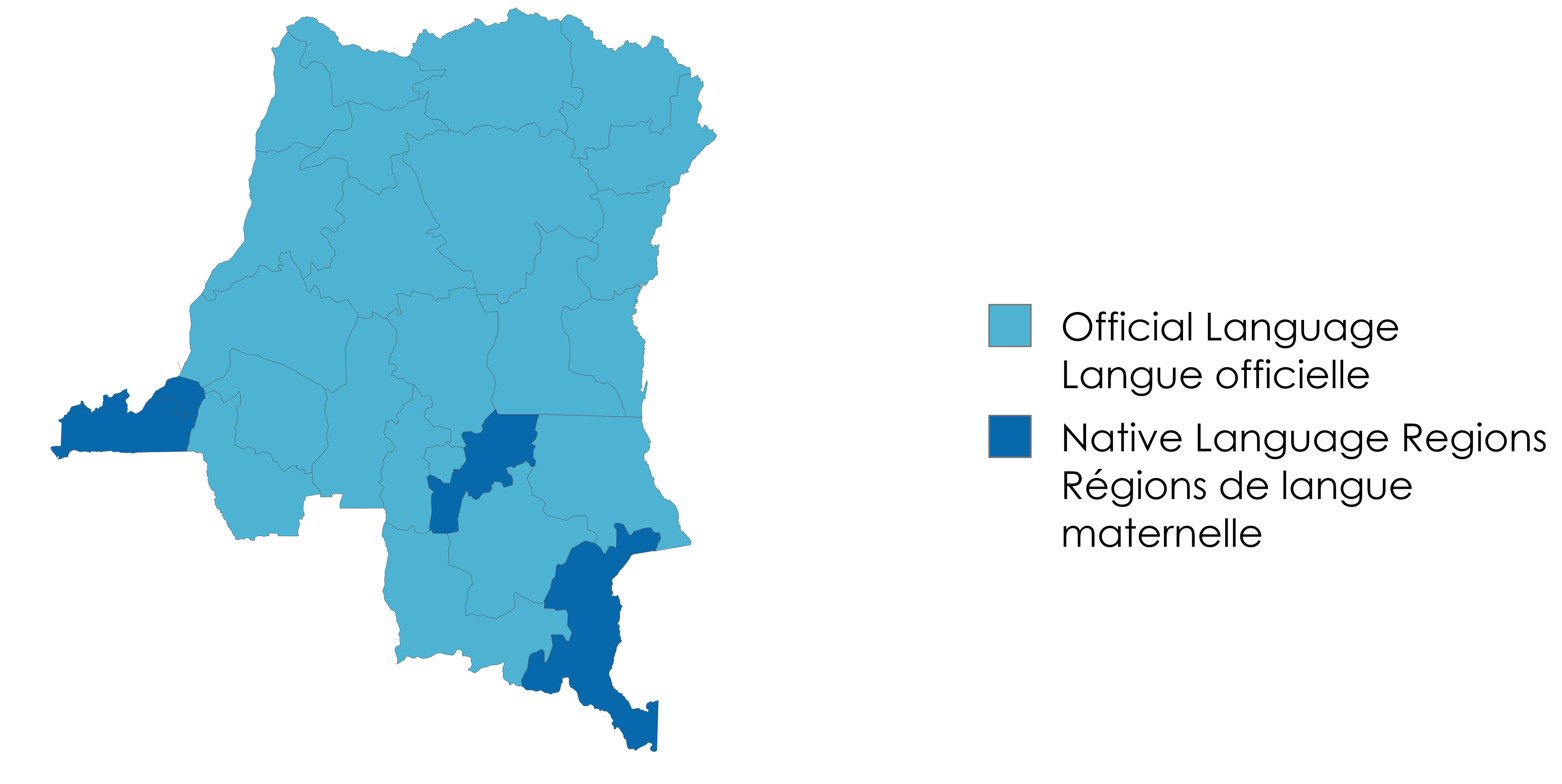
French Language in the DRC - Native and Official reports

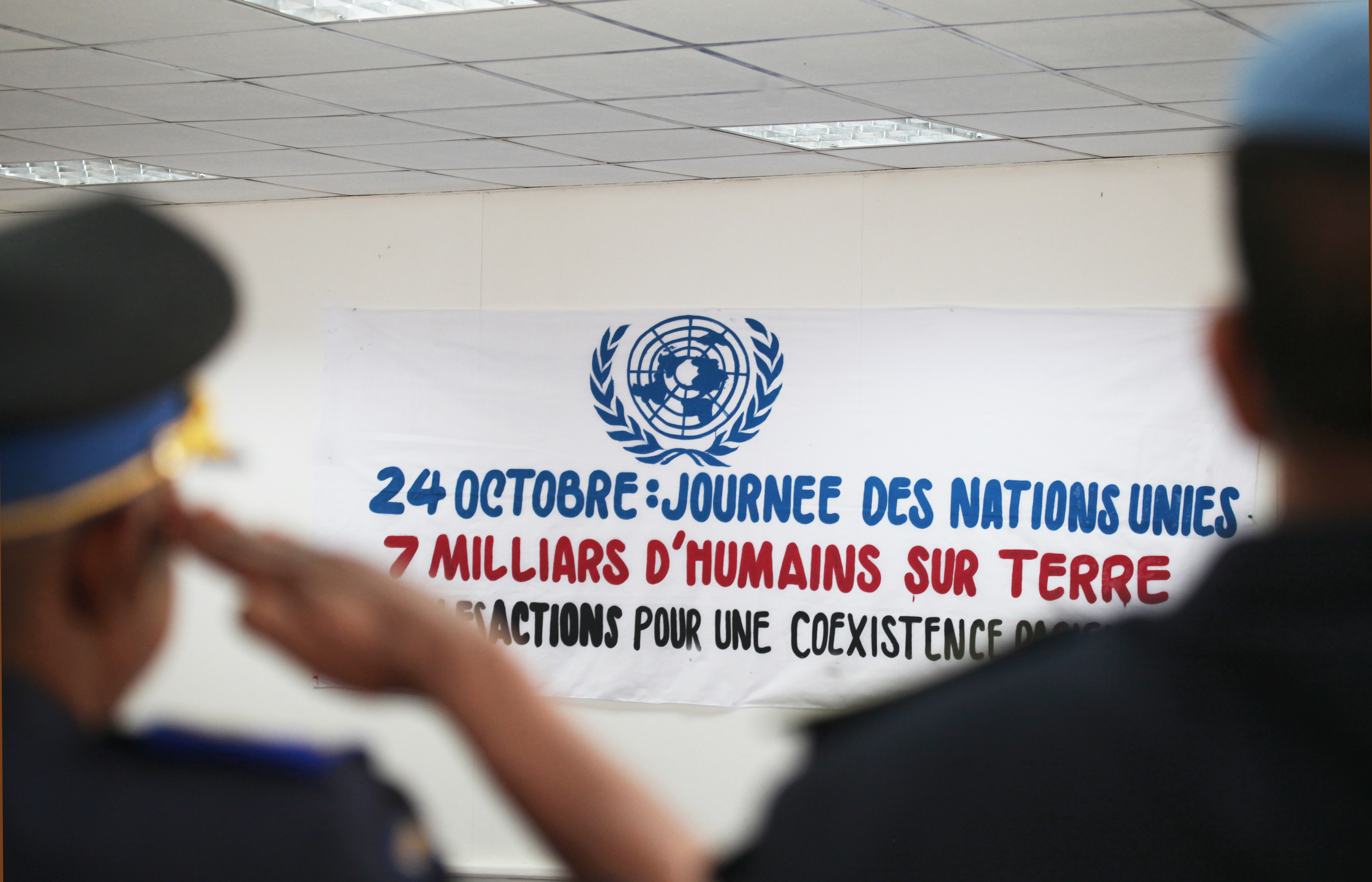
Banner in French in Kinshasa

French has been the official language of the country since its colonial period under Belgian rule. Therefore, the variety of French used in the DRC has many similarities with Belgian French. French has been maintained as the official language since the time of independence because it is widely spoken in Kinshasa, the capital of the country. It belongs to none of the indigenous ethnic groups and eases communication between them as well as with the rest of the Francophonie, which includes many African countries. According to a 2018 OIF report, 42.5 million Congolese people (50.6% of the population) can read and write in French. In the capital city Kinshasa, 67% of the population can read and write French, and 68.5% can speak and understand it. The Democratic Republic of the Congo currently has the largest population of any country with French as its official language.

Additionally, French has become a native language among the middle and upper class in cities like Kinshasa and Lubumbashi. French has been reported to be spoken natively by around 12% of the DRC, with just under 12 million speakers in large cities.

Date	Total French Speakers (Percentage)
1955	1.50%
1975	4%
1995	10%
2005	40%
2025	50.44%

== Kikongo ya leta ==
Although Kikongo is listed as one of the national languages in the constitution, the term ''Kikongo'' officially refers to Kikongo ya Leta (Kituba). In practice, the Kikongo-based creole, Kituba is used in the constitution and by the administration in the provinces of Bas-Congo (which are inhabited by the Bakongo), Kwango, and Kwilu. Kituba has become a vehicular language in many urban centres including Kikwit, Bandundu, Matadi, Boma and Muanda.

== Lingala ==
Lingala in its modern form was heavily shaped by the colonial period by the push of missionaries to standardize its grammar and vocabulary. It was originally spoken only in the northwestern region of the Congo river basin but rapidly spread to the middle Congo area and eventually became the major Bantu language. Kinshasa, the capital, mainly speaks Lingala.

Lingala was made the official language of the army under Mobutu, but since his ousting in 1997, the army has also taken to using Swahili in the eastern regions. The positions of French and Lingala as lingua francas became threatened by English and Kiswahili. After the transition period and the consolidation of different armed groups into the Congolese Army, the Armed Forces of the Democratic Republic of the Congo's linguistic policy reverted back to Lingala.

A 2021 survey found that Lingala was the second-most spoken language in the country, used by 59% of the population.

== Swahili ==
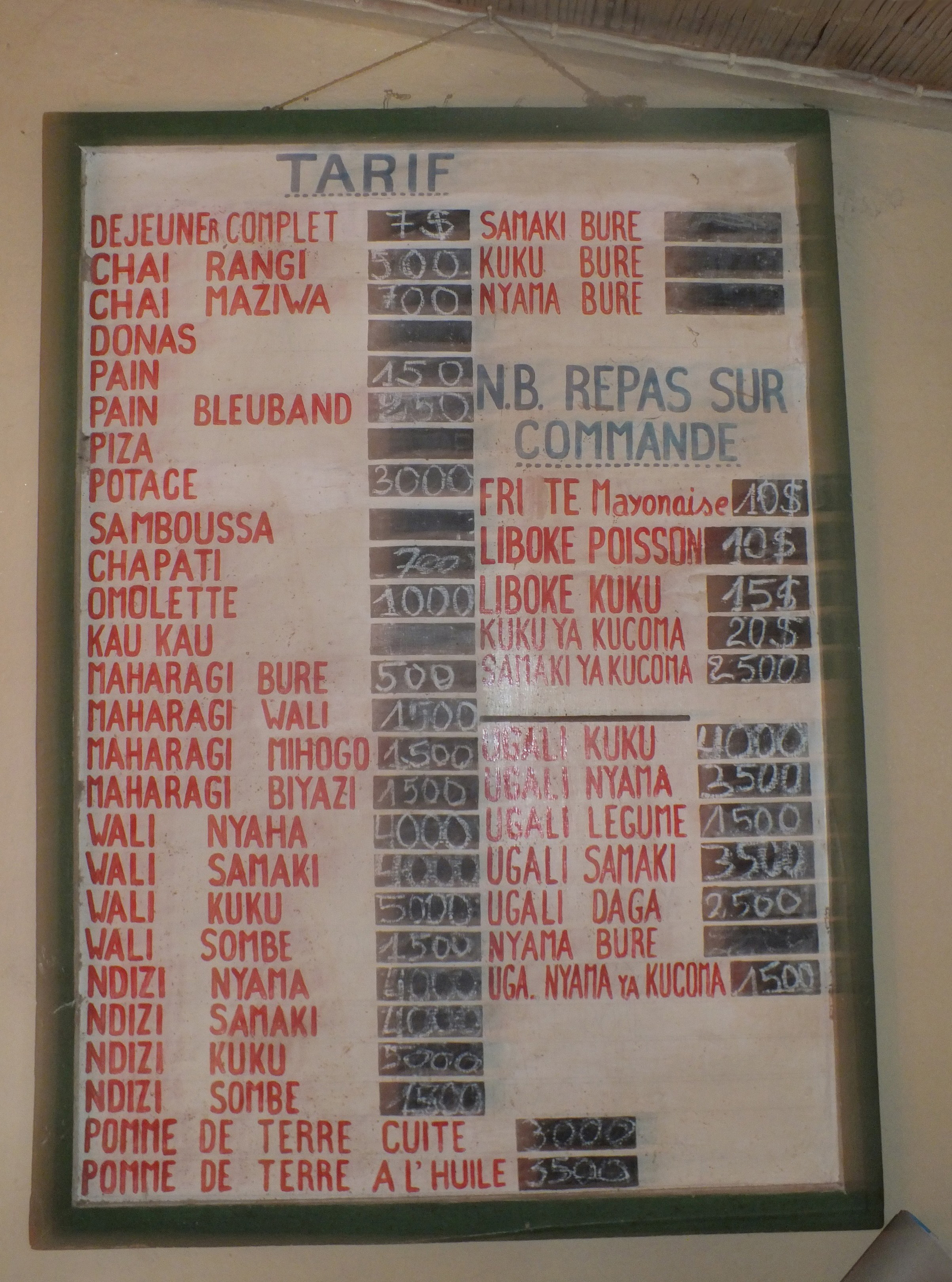
Menu in DR Congo in Swahili and French

Swahili is the most widespread lingua franca in East Africa. In Congo, the local dialect of Swahili is known as Congo Swahili and differs considerably from Standard Swahili. Many variations of Congo Swahili are spoken in the country but the major one is Kingwana, sometimes called Copperbelt Swahili, especially in the Katanga area.

== Tshiluba ==
The constitution does not specify which of the two major variations of Tshiluba is the national language. Luba-Kasai is spoken in the East Kasai Region (Luba people) and Luba-Lulua is used in the West Kasai Region among the Bena Lulua people. Luba-Kasai seems to be the language used by the administration. A related language, known as Luba-Katanga, is spoken in Katanga Province.

== Other languages ==
The most notable other languages of the Democratic Republic of the Congo are Mashi, Mongo, Lunda, Kilega, Tetela, Chokwe, Budza, Ngbandi, Lendu, Mangbetu, Yombe, Nande, Ngbaka, Zande, Lugbara, Kifuliiru and Komo.

As of 2010 the government decided to include Portuguese as an optional language at schools as a response to Brazil's increasing influence on the continent, and of the growing and considerable Angolan and Mozambican immigrant communities.

Among the various forms of slang spoken in the Congo, Indubil has been noted since around the 1960s and continues to evolve today.

== Sign languages ==
There are 12 deaf institutions in the country, most teaching French Sign Language or variations. American Sign Language is also practiced in the country.

== Foreign languages ==
=== Dutch ===
Dutch, one of the languages of Belgium, had official status in the Congo Free State from 1885 to 1908 and the Belgian Congo from 1908 to 1960. Although spoken by many Belgian colonials especially Catholic missionaries, French was largely favored by the Belgian administration. A good knowledge of the French language was necessary to obtain a promotion in the colony and the Dutch-speakers were therefore more dispersed in the provinces while the French-speakers were grouped together in the cities.

=== English ===
English is used by ministers and on certain official occasions. Former president Joseph Kabila grew up and studied in Tanzania, an English-speaking nation. Moreover, English is the language most often used by UN soldiers in the DRC and, since the 1960s, by a large number of Congolese refugees who have returned to the country after having previously lived in neighbouring countries where English is widely spoken (Zambia, Tanzania, Uganda, etc.).

== See also ==
- Languages of the Republic of the Congo
