= Luj =

Luj or LUJ may refer to:

- ISO code for the Luna language
- Luj, a region near Dharwas in the Chamba district in Himachal Pradesh, India
- LUJ, IATA airport code for Lusikisiki Airport, South Africa, on List of airports in South Africa
