= Bangubangu =

Bantu people from the eastern Democratic Republic of Congo

Regions with significant populations
- Democratic Republic of the Congo(Maniema, Tanganyika Province) • Tanzania

Languages
- Bangubangu • Kiswahili • French • Luba languages • English

Religion
- Islam • Christianity

Related ethnic groups
- Baluba • Bahemba

The Bangubangu are a Bantu people from the eastern Democratic Republic of Congo, primarily in the Kabambare Territory. They speak the Bangubangu language. They also live in Tanzania, where they migrated during the 18th century and are usually known by the umbrella term Manyema, which also includes other ethnic groups originating from the same area.
