= Songye people =

Bantu ethnic group

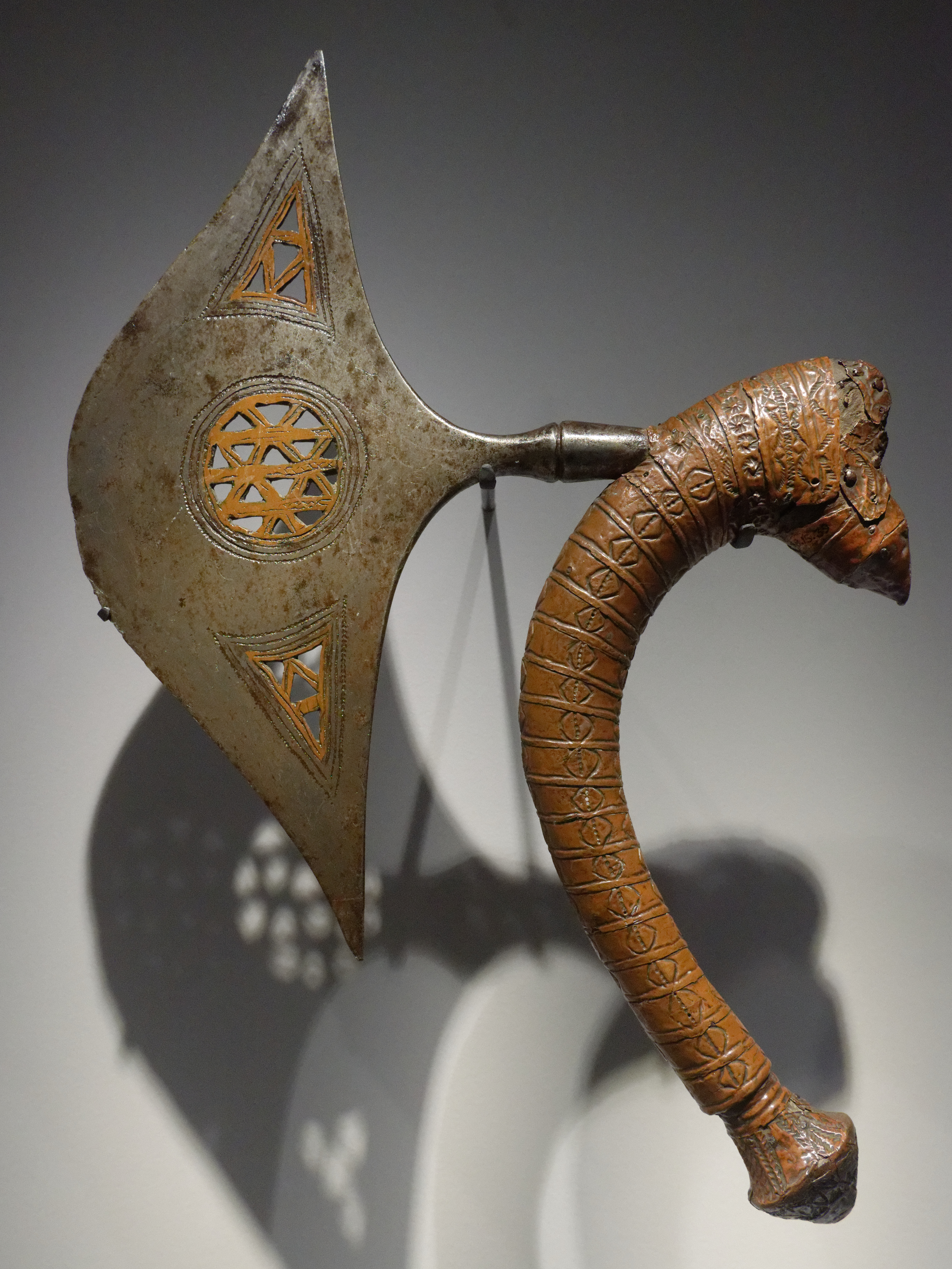
- Songye ceremonial axe, 19th century

Total population
- approx. 4,000,000

Regions with significant populations
- Democratic Republic of the Congo

Languages
- Songe language; Tshiluba; Swahili; Lingala; French

Religion
- Christianity, Islam

Related ethnic groups
- Luba people, Lunda people, Hemba people, Bemba people, Tetela people, Lokele people, Chokwe people and other Bantu peoples

- Person: Musongye
- People: Basongye
- Language: Kisonge

The Songye people, sometimes written Songe, are a Bantu ethnic group from the central Democratic Republic of the Congo. They speak the Songe language. They inhabit a vast territory between the Sankuru/Lulibash river in the west and the Lualaba River in the east. Many Songye villages can be found in present-day East Kasai province, parts of Katanga and Kivu Province. The people of Songye are divided into thirty-four conglomerate societies; each society is led by a single chief with a Judiciary Council of elders and nobles (bilolo). Smaller kingdoms east of the Lomami River refer to themselves as Songye, other kingdoms in the west, refer to themselves as Kalebwe, Eki, Ilande, Bala, Chofwe, Sanga and Tempa. As a society, the people of Songye are mainly known as a farming community; they do, however, take part in hunting and trading with other neighboring communities.

== Origins and ancestors ==
The origin of the Songye begins when its founding ancestors Tshimbale and Kongolo (king) established the Kingdom of Luba. Tshimbale and Kongolo played an important role in establishing the foundation of Luba's political empire. After suffering from political dissension, the ancestors of Songye migrated out of the Luba Empire. The Songye honor their ancestors and cultural heroes through a series of different practices and occasions. In Songye culture, it is believed that the chiefs are sacred heirs of their ancestors and of the founding cultural hero. Hunting was an occupation associated with cultural heroes: Chiefs would organize hunting of animals to showcase the power that was imbued in him by the cultural hero he was honoring. Blacksmithing was another craft that was associated with their heroes. Their smiths were reputed for their production of arms; their axes were used by Luba, and some were found in the ruins of Khami in Rhodesia.

== Origin and Structure of Chiefdoms ==
The pre-colonial political structure of the Songye people was characterized by centralized chiefdoms rather than a single unified empire. According to oral history and ethnographic research by Dunja Hersak, the Kalebwe chiefdoms claimed origins linked to the Luba region of Shaba, supported by archaeological evidence from Sanga indicating Early Iron Age settlements.

=== Governance and Leadership ===
The political hierarchy featured supreme chiefs who underwent elaborate investiture rituals, including the kutomboka musanga dance—symbolizing the shedding of blood and the chief's dual attributes as a warrior and protector. Among the eastern chiefdoms and the Kalebwe, governance involved a central governing body composed of royal family members (bana bua) and chosen ministers (bubikale). Unlike absolute rulers, some eastern chiefdom candidates were elected from lineage leaders for limited terms ranging from three to five years, subject to deposition or re-election based on popular consensus.

=== Decline ===
The centralized power of these chiefdoms began to disintegrate in the late 19th century due to Arab ivory and slave raiding, the arrival of Belgian colonial administrators, and internal succession disputes.

== Cosmology ==
The Songye believe in a single supreme god and divine creator known as Efile Mukulu. According to a creation myth documented among the central Songye, Efile Mukulu brought eight elements into existence: the sun, the moon, the star, water, earth, fire, the wind, and the rainbow. Water, viewed as a female element, delivers humans into physical life. Upon entering physical life, humans are endowed with a soul or individualized mental force called kikudi, which originates from a star. The wind functions as the distributor of kikudi and human consciousness, while the earth serves as the final matrix of human existence.

=== The Realm of Spirits ===
The Songye divide the spirit world into distinct hierarchical categories. Benevolent ancestral spirits are associated with Efile and act as guardians and protectors. Conversely, malevolent or wandering spirits are referred to as mikishi. The physical environment is deeply connected to this spiritual world, with geographical features like rivers, waterfalls, and specific trees holding sacred power and facilitating communication with ancestors.

=== Specialists in Mystical Power ===
Spiritual and magical practices are managed by specialists within the community. A socially approved specialist in mystical power is known as a nganga. The nganga utilizes mystical knowledge for the community's protection and the creation of magical substances. They operate in direct opposition to the basha masende, who are malevolent practitioners of sorcery.

== Secret Society: Bwadi bra Kifwebe ==
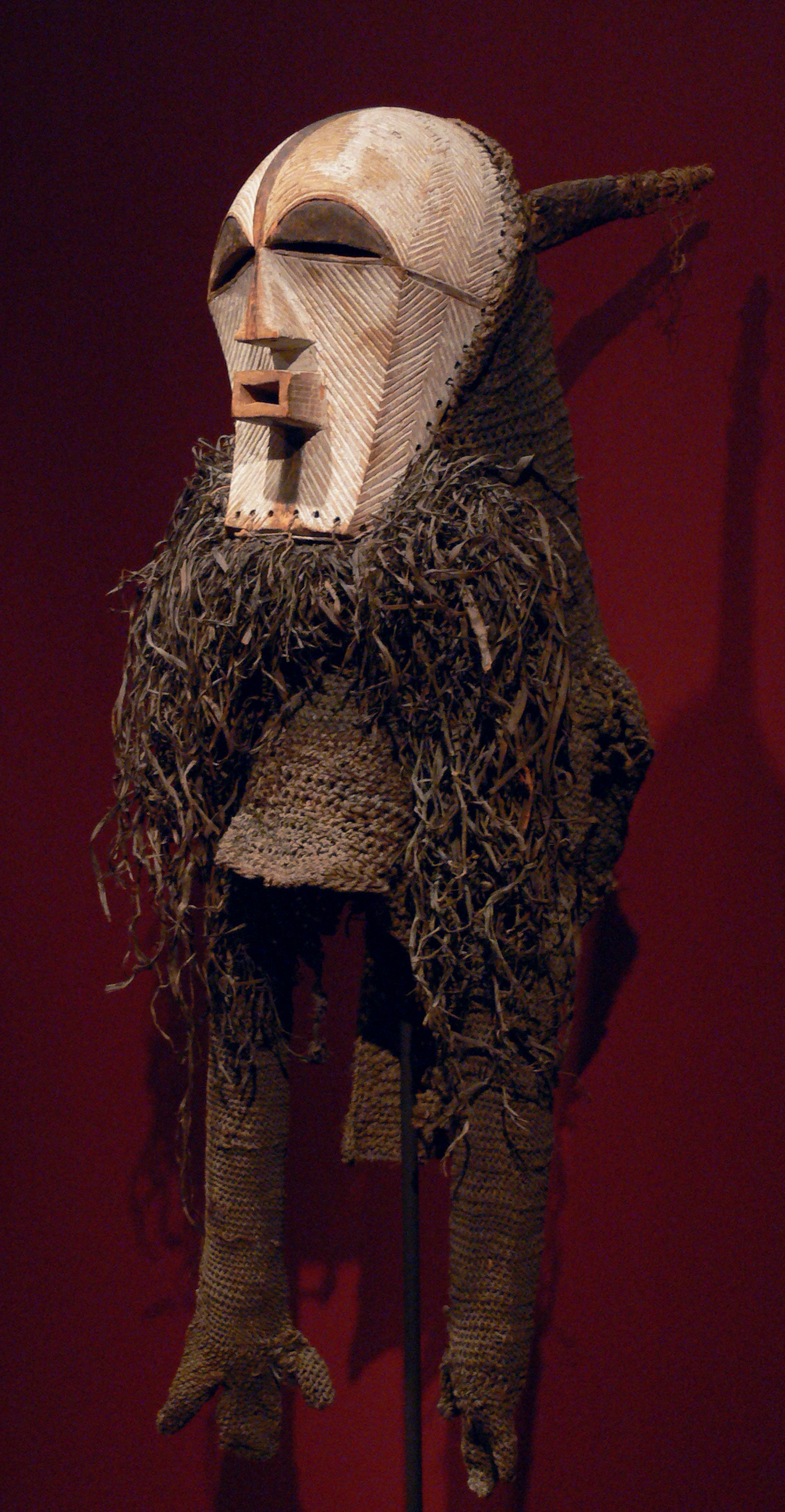
Example of how the top of a typical masquerader would look.

Bwadi bra Kifwebe is a secret society of masked men. In the community, these men were known for their use of magic (Buki or Buchi) and sorcery (Masende). Buki and Masende magic differ from witchcraft; these types of magic are inherited or obtained either by will or unconsciously. Witchcraft, in contrast, can be obtained through initiation and at the appropriate use of magical ingredients. In order to become a member of the Bwadi bra Kifwebe, all applicants must undergo an initiation process. During this process, initiates must learn and identify a secret esoteric language. They must undergo a radical and violent experience in order to become less fearful of the unknown and learn their roles within the subject to Bwadi bra Kifwebe. Some of the Bwadi bra Kifwebe help regulate and maintain political order and balance between the chief and his communities. The Bwadi bra Kifwebe maintain balance within the community by conducting masquerades, rituals and rites such as initiation rituals, circumcisions and funerals.

== Masquerades ==
The Bwadi bra Kifwebe maintain balance within the community by conducting masquerades.

=== Dancers ===
The overall appearance of a masquerader varies on the dancer, the type of ceremony they're performing in, and spirit being evoked. Normally Masqueraders have a wooden mask and are covered head to toe in flowing black raffia fibers made from the bark or roots of trees. Their arms, bodies and legs are covered with raffia netting, with goat skins fastened around their waist. The dancers are male and the complexity of their costume varies on their status within the community. When the dancer is wearing a male mask his movements are aggressive and unstable, however when a dancer wears a female mask his movements are gentle and controlled. The dances of the kifwebe dancers are meant to encourage social conformity within the community showing its people how one should behave in their society.

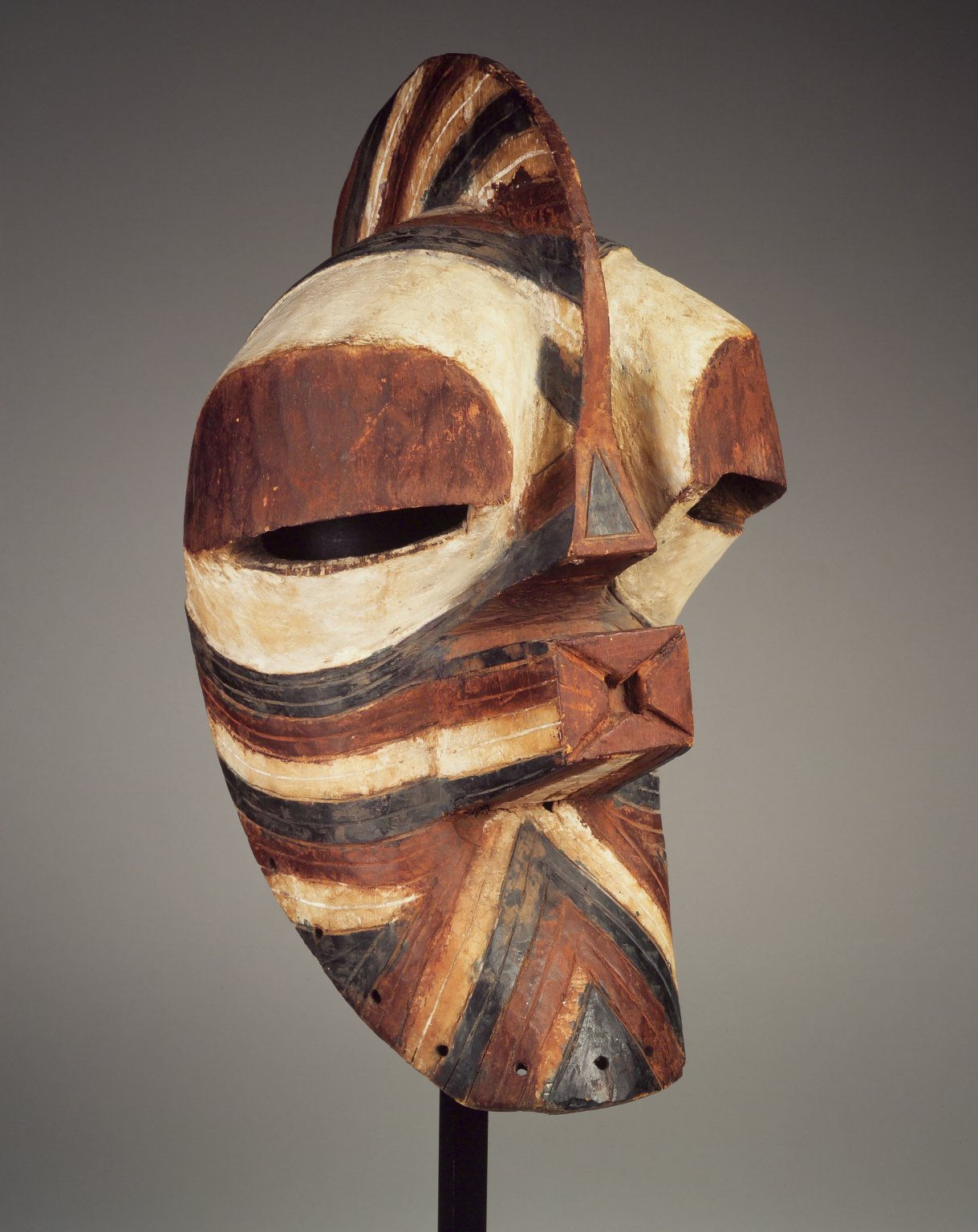
A male kifwebe mask, Songye tribe

== Mask ==
=== Cosmology of a mask ===
There are two different types of kifwebe masks. The kifwebe masks come in various designs and reference different aspects of nature, culture and cosmology. Kifwebe masks symbolized the spirits of the dead, the underworld and the struggle between good and evil (Community vs antisocial practices and witchcraft), each element of the mask symbolized these aspects in a certain way. the intertwining of the rhythmic colors of red, black and white was meant to symbolize the struggle between good (white) and evil (black and red), the combination of these colors embody the positive and dangerous force held with in the mask. The ruggedness of the mask itself symbolizes the underworld and the spirits escape from it.

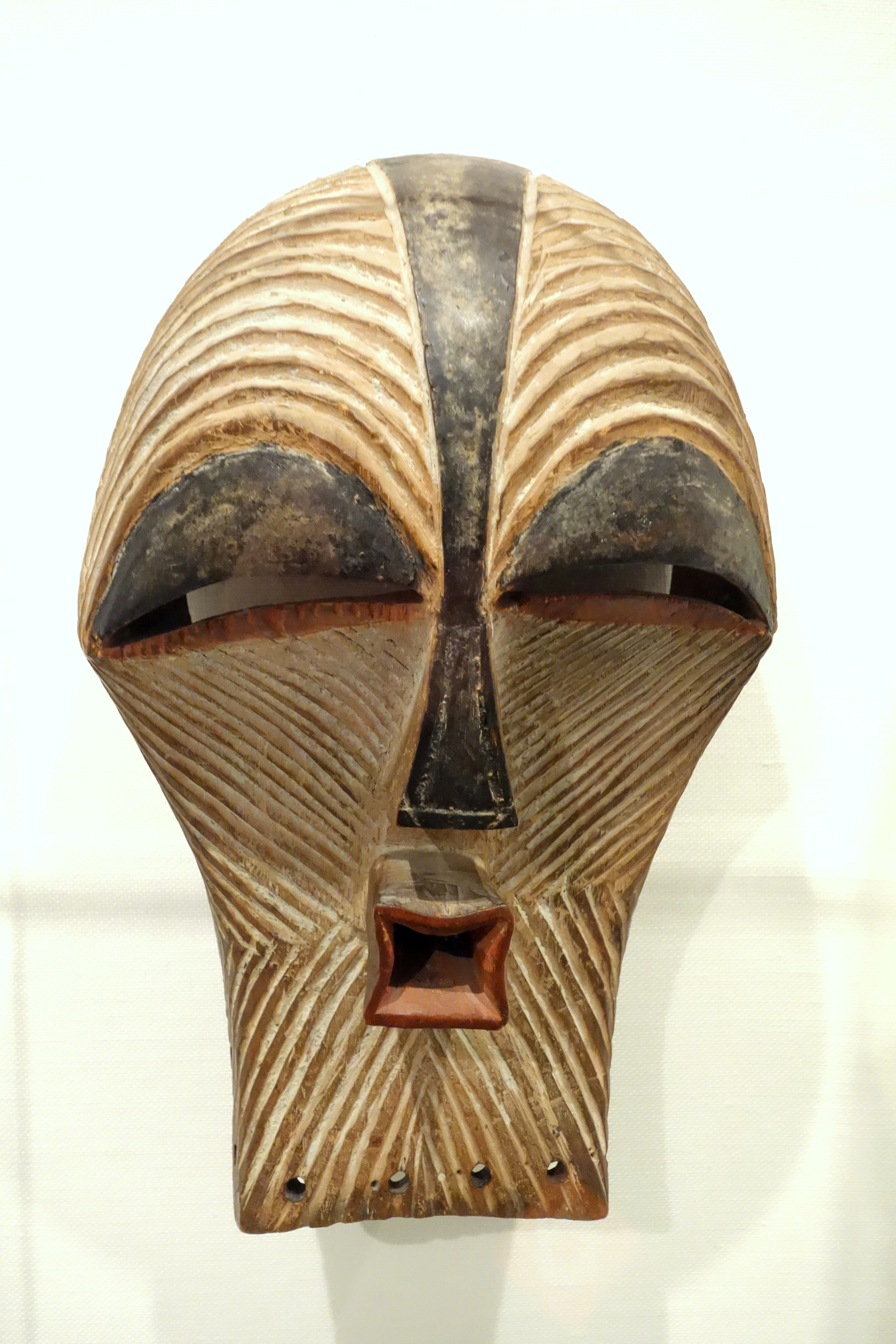

=== Male and Female kifwebe masks ===
Male Kifwebe masks were mainly used for initiation ceremonies, circumcision, and the enthronement and funerals of the supreme chief. The face of a typical Kifwebe masks is covered with linear incisions, a square protruding mouth and a linear nose set between globular pierced eyes. Male masks typical have a centered crest on the top of the masks and its size varies on the status of the dancer wearing it, elder dances within the Bwadi bra Kifwebe have larger centered crest compared to others. Female Kifwebe masks was typically used for public ceremonies and reproduction rituals. Women within the Songye community were viewed as the bearer of children and good fortune. To them, women represent continuation of life and cultural tradition. The features of the female kifwebe mask was meant to portray these ideas. Typically they share similar characteristics as the male mask however it facial features are more gentle and rounded evoking the tenderness of a mother as well as the power to protect and support her children. The structure of the face is longed, the mask itself is covered in white paint or Kaolin.

== Mankishi and the spirits within ==
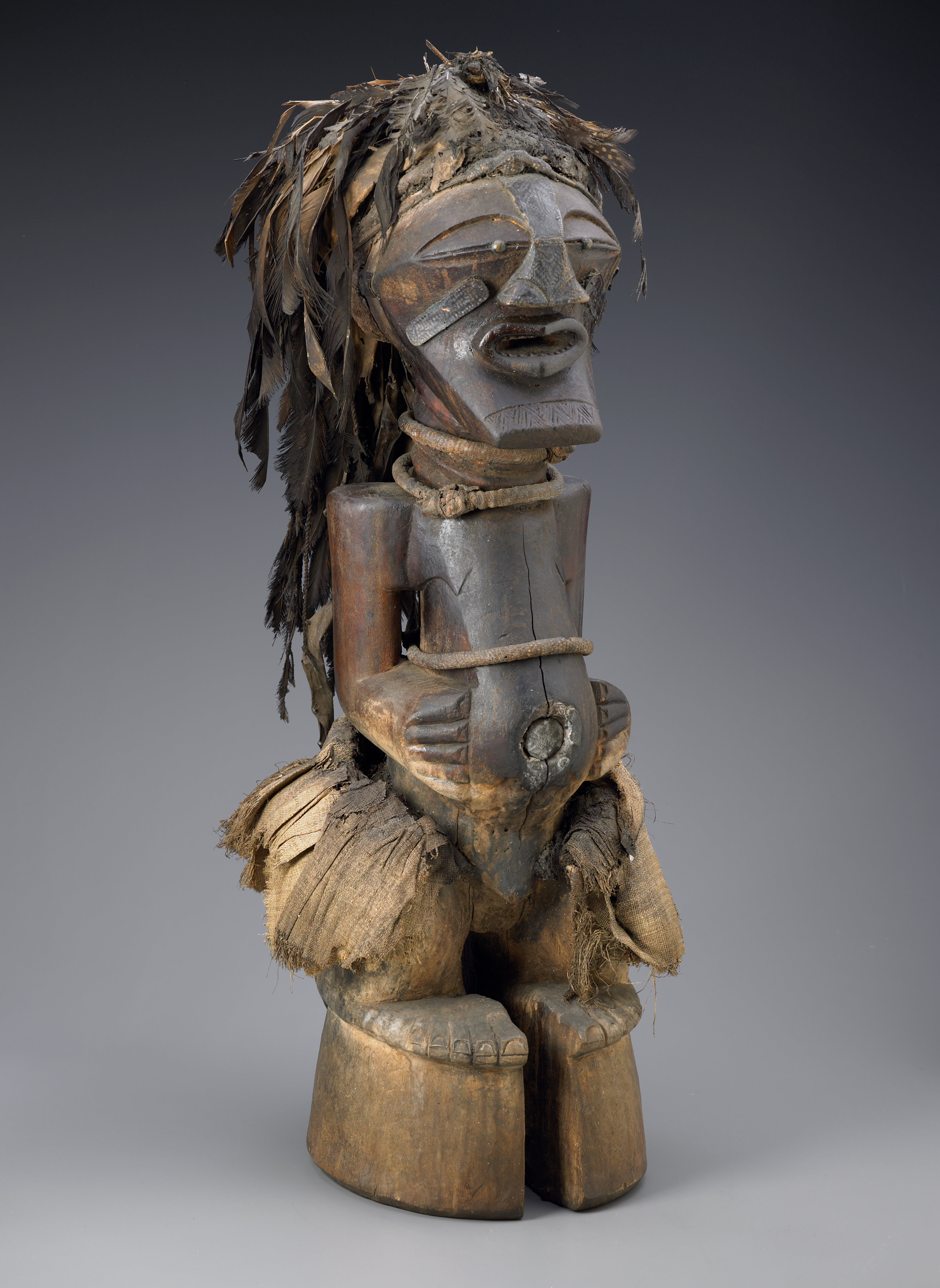
Songye power figure in the Indianapolis Museum of Art. Height 84 cm.

Mankishi (singular: Nkishi) are spirits of the dead that can influence the world of men. These spirits can be malevolent spirits causing infertility, bad harvests and sickness or benevolent spirits bringing good health and prosperity in the hunt and field. The Songye believe that spirits can be reborn; benevolent spirits are believed to be reborn by creating a mamkishi power figure, while malevolent spirits (bikudi) are not reborn and are forced to roam the earth for eternity. Not all spirits who are unable to be reborn as a Nkishi are wandering spirits, spirits who are not reborn yet are knowledgeable on their power and knowledge of patrilineage founders, heroic leaders, and lineage chiefs and dignitaries become guardians of the lineage and provide general protection. Mankishi conform to a certain magico-social standard within the Songye community. Songye figures serves as a protectors of the community, encourages fertility and protects families from evil spirits and practitioners. Nganga (magical practitioners) are responsible for commissioning these figures, they decide the dimensions, sex morphological aspects, and the type of wood used for the figure.

These Sculptures comes various forms and serves different purposes, Usually Mankishi are depicted as a large stylized sculptures of a standing on a base. In profile, the repetition of strong diagonals in the hair, beard forearm and feet are forceful and aesthetically pleasing. The horizontal shoulders arm and legs helps gives the figure a sense of energy and movement. The Stance is meant to signify the Mankishi's alertness and readiness to carry out his purpose whether it is protecting its owner from evil spirits or witches and sorcerers. Its head is usually elongated with sharp facial feature such as the eyes, chin, and rectangular nose. Its torso is also elongated yet the center of abdomen is hollowed along with the top of the head so that the Bijimba, a magical substance created by the Nganga, can be housed in the sculpture and bring spiritual power to it.

Female Mankishi exist, but they are smaller, less common, and they are usually for personal usage. Like its male counterpart, a female Nkishi has a cavity in the abdomen and head to house the Bijimba. The figure itself usually shows signs of scarification on its face and above its face. The legs of the figure are posed in an unusual way and appears to be unfinished, this may suggests that it was covered by sacred objects and was not meant to be shown.

When a Nkishi is being used, the Nganga places shells, horns, animal skins, nails or studs and other spiritual objects outside of the figure to enhance its power and influence. The housing of the Mankishi varies on its size, purpose and importance, larger Mankishi that are created to guard and protect a family or village is housed in a family shine. Smaller more personal Mankishi are usually kept by the owner and are portable.

== See also ==
- Zappo Zap
