= Songe language =

Bantu language spoken in DR Congo

Songe
- Kisonge, Yembe, Lusongye
- Native to: Democratic Republic of the Congo
- Region: Kasai-Oriental, Sankuru, Lomami,Tanganyika, Maniema
- Ethnicity: Songye people
- Native speakers: approx. 2–3 million (2026)
- Language family: Niger–Congo?: Atlantic–Congo; Benue–Congo; Bantoid; Bantu; Luban; Songe–Binji; Songe
- Writing system: Latin script Mandombe script

Language codes
- ISO 639-3: sop
- Glottolog: song1303
- Guthrie code: L.23

Songe, also known as Songye, Kisonge, Lusonge, Yembe, and Northeast Luba, is a Bantu language spoken by the Songye people in the Democratic Republic of the Congo. In particular, it is spoken in the provinces of Kasai Oriental, Lomami, Sankuru, Tanganyika, and Maniema.

Ethnologue notes that Songe is "related" to Mbagani, which they do not include in their database. Maho (2009) labels as "Mbagani (Binji)" one of the two geographic areas Ethnologue assigns to Songe, but says that it is closer to Lwalu; he says that it is a different language, Binji, that is close to Songe.

== Vocabulary ==
=== Nouns and Classes (Substantifs) ===
Kisonge Term	English Translation	Original French	Grammatical Notes
muntu	Person / Human	homme / personne	Singular (Class 1); Plural is bantu
mukashi	Woman / Wife	femme	Singular (Class 1); Plural is bakashi
mema	Water	eu	Pluralia tantum (Class 6; exists only in the plural)
malufu	Palm wine	vin de palme

=== Isolated Pronouns ===
Kisonge Term	English Translation	Original French	Grammatical Notes
ami	I / Me	je / moi	First-person singular
obe	You	tu / toi	Second-person singular
e	He / She / It	il / elle	Third-person singular
atwe	We	nous	First-person plural
anue	You (all))	vous	Second-person plural
abo	They	ils / elles	Third-person plural

=== Adjective Roots and Gender Derivations (Adjectifs) ===
Kisonge Term	English Translation	Original French	Grammatical Notes
-kata	Big / Large	grand	Adjective root
-fita	Black	noir	Adjective root
-uwa	Good	bon	Adjective root
-kashi	Female	femelle	Derivational suffix indicating gender

=== Verbs and Relational Particles (Verbes et Locatifs) ===
Kisonge Term	English Translation	Original French	Grammatical Notes
kukila	To surpass	dépasser	Verb used structurally to form comparative sentences
kukamba	To exceed	surpasser	Verb used structurally to form superlative sentences
-a	Of	de	Associative/Genitive particle (takes prefixes like wa, ba)
mu	Inside / In	dans	Locative marker
ku	Toward / Near	vers / près de	Locative marker
fa / ja	On / Upon	sur	Locative marker

== Phonology ==
=== Vowels ===
A five vowel system with vowel length is present:

	Front	Central	Back
Close	i iː		u uː
Mid	e eː		o oː
Open		a aː	

=== Consonants ===
		Labial	Alveolar	Post-alv./ Palatal	Velar
Nasal		m	n	ɲ	ŋ
Plosive/ Affricate	voiceless	p	t	tʃ	k
Plosive/ Affricate	vl. prenasal	ᵐp	ⁿt	ⁿtʃ	ᵑk
Plosive/ Affricate	voiced	b	d		ɡ
Plosive/ Affricate	vd. prenasal	ᵐb	ⁿd		ᵑɡ
Fricative	voiceless	f	s	ʃ	
Fricative	vl. prenasal	ᶬf	ⁿs	ⁿʃ	
Fricative	voiced	v	z	ʒ	
Fricative	vd. prenasal	ᶬv	ⁿz	ⁿʒ	
Approximant			l	j	w

== Sample text ==
Nkindi 31:1-10 (Jehovah’s Witnesses version)

Ano mmayi a nfumu Lemuele, mukandu wa muulo ubaadi nyinaye mumulungule bua kumulongiesha: Nkulungule namu kinyi, Ô muana ande mulume, Nkulungule kinyi, Ô muana a muifu diande, Na nkulungule kinyi, obe muana a mitshipo yande? Tokumanga kupa bana bakashi bukome bobe, Sunga kulonda mashinda aabutulaa ba nfumu. Tabi buwa bua ba nfumu, Ô Lemuele, Tabi buwa ba nfumu batome malofu, Sunga bakunkushi buabadia kuamba’shi: “A malofu ande e kunyi?” Tala batoma, baaluba miiya, Na baluisha kilumbu kia bantu bashadile. Pa baba abashimina malofu ebukopo, Na ope baba be na kinyongua kibukopo nfinyo. Batome bua’shi balube bulanda buabo; Na bayiluankane nkalakashi yabo. Akuila muntu shi na bia kuilamuina; Kaluila matalua a baba boso babakimbi kuipaa. Akula na osambishe na kululama; Kaluila matalua a bantu bashadile na balanda. Nnanyi mulombene kupeta mukashi sha ngobesha? E na muulo ukata kukila mabue a koraye.

Translation

Proverbs 31:1-10 (Jehovah’s Witnesses version)

The words of King Lemʹu·el, the weighty message his mother gave to instruct him: What should I tell you, O my son, What, O son of my womb, and what, O son of my vows? Do not give your vigor to women, nor follow ways that destroy kings. It is not for kings, O Lemʹu·el, it is not for kings to drink wine, nor for rulers to say, “Where is my drink?” So that they do not drink and forget what is decreed, and pervert the rights of the lowly ones. Give alcohol to those who are perishing, and wine to those in bitter distress. Let them drink and forget their poverty; Let them remember their trouble no more. Speak up on behalf of the speechless; Defend the rights of all who are perishing. Speak up and judge righteously; defend the rights of the lowly and the poor. Who can find a capable wife? Her value is far more than that of corals.

- Palatalization [ʲ] and labialization [ʷ] is also present among consonant sounds.
