= Kebwe language =

Bantu language of DR Congo

Kebwe
- Mikebwe
- Native to: Democratic Republic of the Congo
- Language family: Niger–Congo?: Atlantic–Congo; Benue–Congo; Bantoid; Bantu; Luban; Hemba–Kebwe; Kebwe

Language codes
- ISO 639-3: None (mis)
- Glottolog: mike1238
- Guthrie code: L.301

Kebwe (Mikebwe) is a Bantu language of the Democratic Republic of the Congo. It was related to Hemba by Ahmed (1995).
