= Kifwebe =

Mask of the Congo

The term Kifwebe (sometimes referred to as Bifwebe), meaning mask, refers to the traditional masks worn by the Songye and Luba peoples of the Congo. They are most often worn in all-male performances, the purposes of which vary greatly and can be for both sacred and secular purposes. Kifwebe masks are characterized by shapes and colors which represent age, gender, and status. The colors red and white represent the concept of duality and harmony (good and evil, men and women, etc).

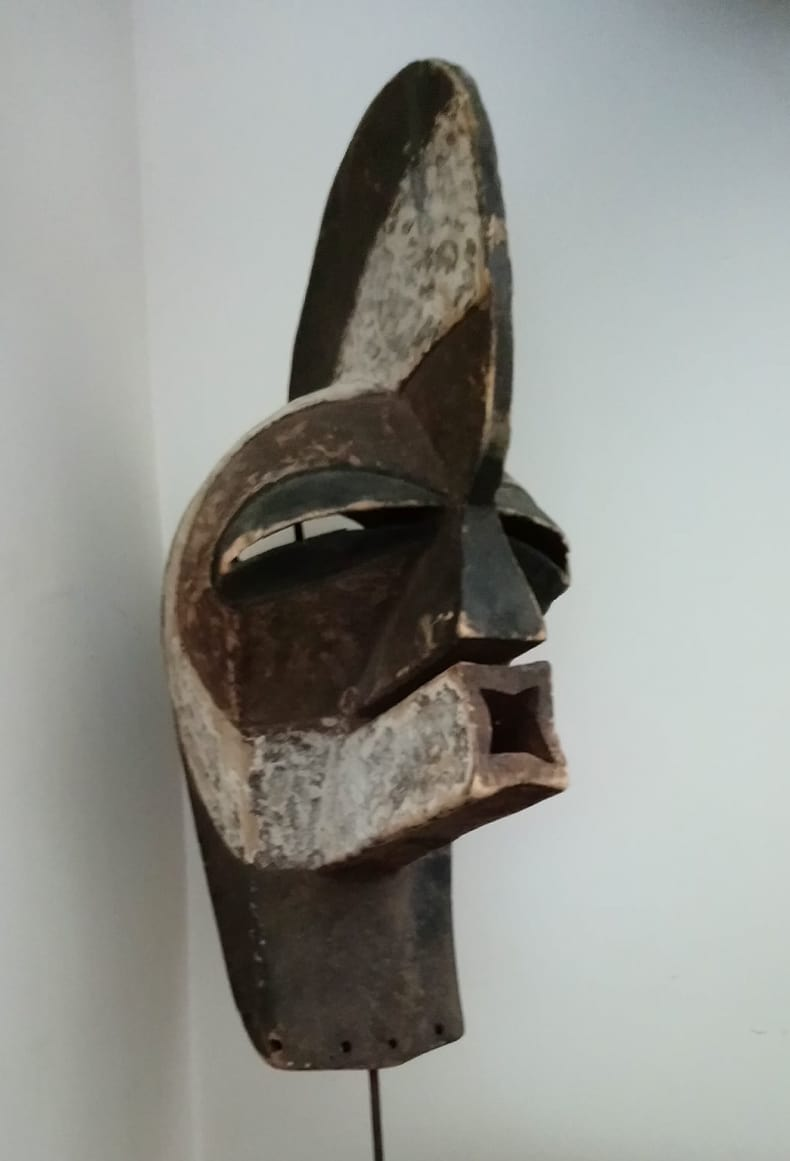
Kifwebe mask of the Songye

== Uses ==
These masks may vary widely in shape, color, and size to signify various aspects of the characters or figures they are meant to portray. The ceremonies and performances in which Kifwebe have been worn historically include funerals, secret society initiations, plays, and a number of spiritual rituals, including those for healing, fertility, and warding off hidden threats or enemies. Amongst the tradition of the Luba people, dances related to fertility which utilized Kifwebe took place during took place during the new moon. The masks were sometimes used in ceremonies of the Kifwebe secret societies where dances of the same name were performed, and the masks were then dressed with beards of long plant fibres attached to holes on the edges of the mask (Figure A). When these beards were absent (lack of fixing holes on the border of the mask) they were called Kabemba (meaning "hawks").

== Male and Female Masks ==
Masquerade Ceremonies using Kifwebe are performed with all-male dancers. The masks that they adorn are representative of either the female spirit or the male spirit. Female masks are often represented by white coloring, presumably referencing their cultural connection to the moon. In the customs of the Luba people, female masks are much larger than their male counterparts. Female masks can also be identified from scratches in the surface, meant to resemble scarification. Male masks are broadly represented through red, black, and white stripes. Holes around the rim of the masks were often used to attach beards made of fibrous material. Crests on male masks are a symbol of age and wisdom. The distinction between male and female masks allowed performers to act out different gender roles and expectations. Male masks often were depicted as dominant and enforced the rules of their elders. Female masks were characterized by their benevolence and balance.

== Gallery ==
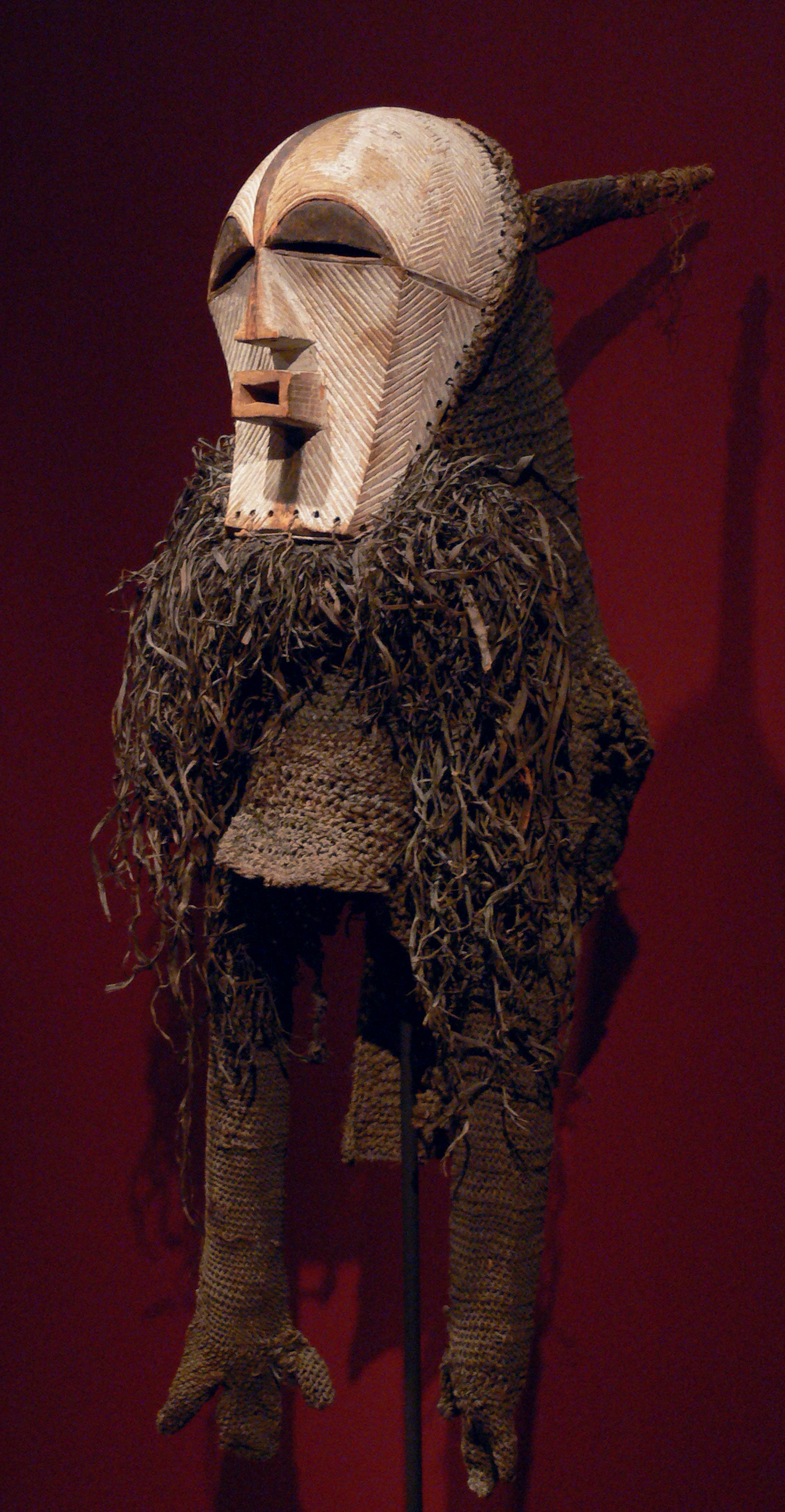
Figure A : Kifwebe with fibres beard

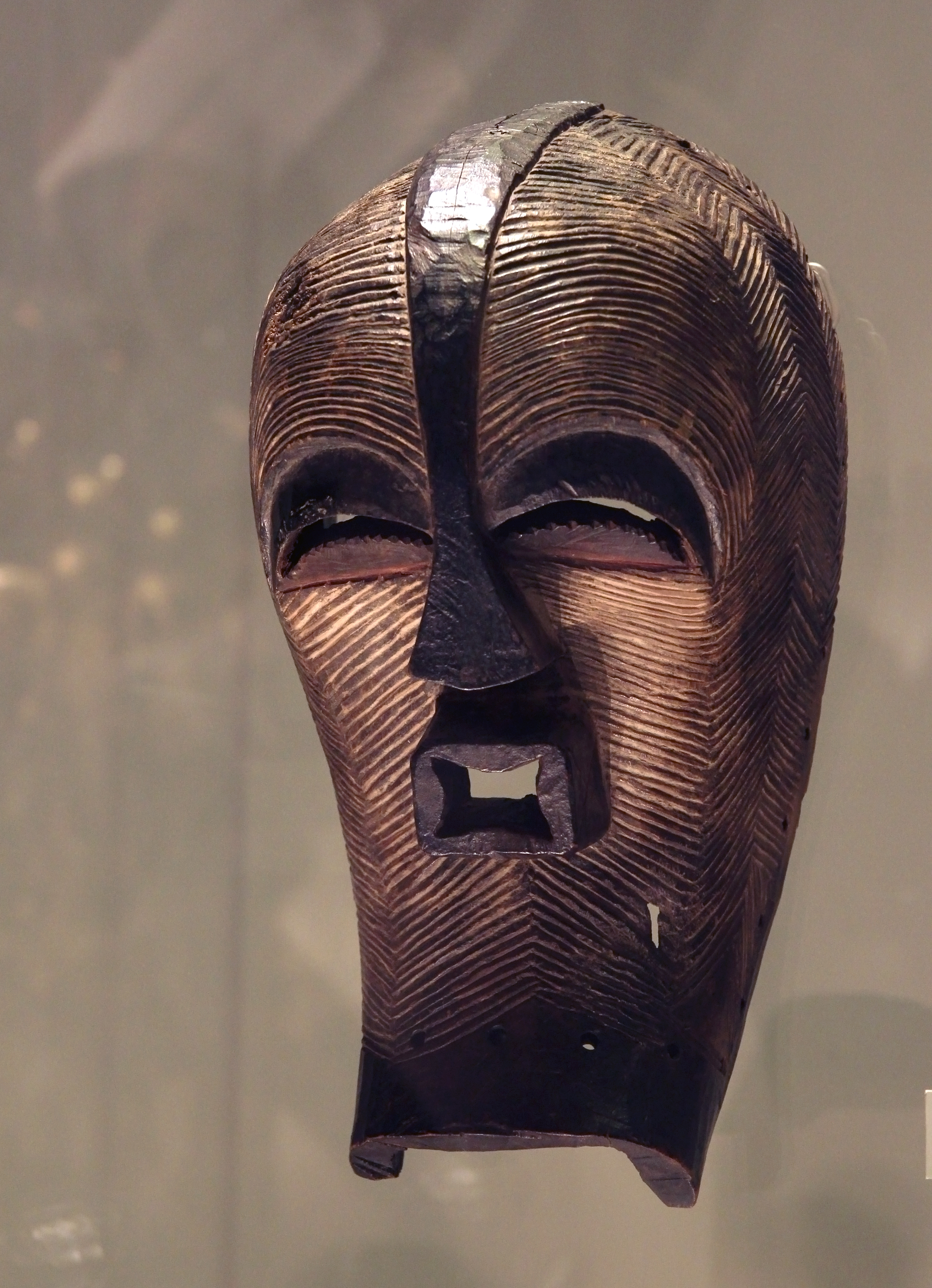
Kifwebe of the Songye

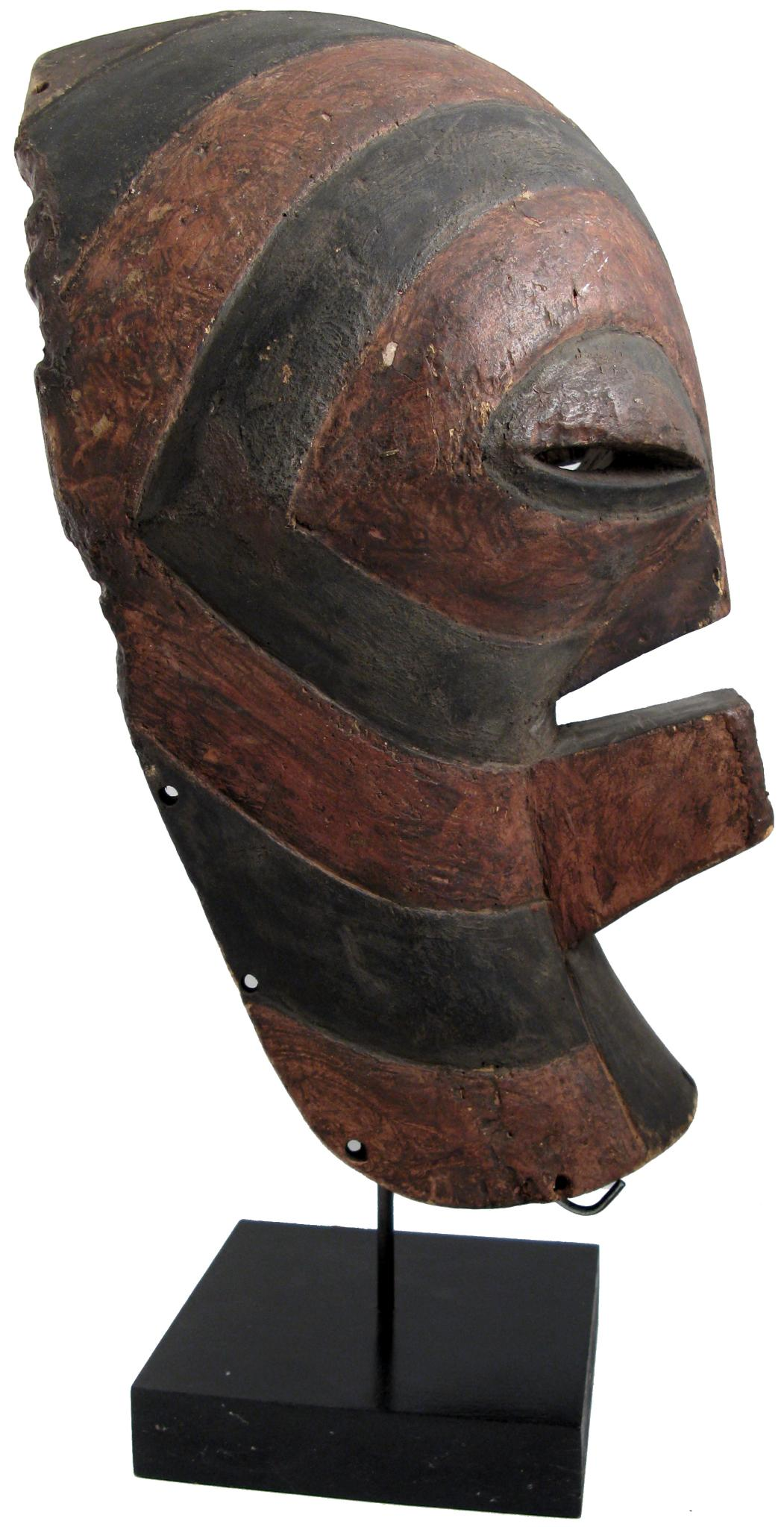
Painted kifwebe

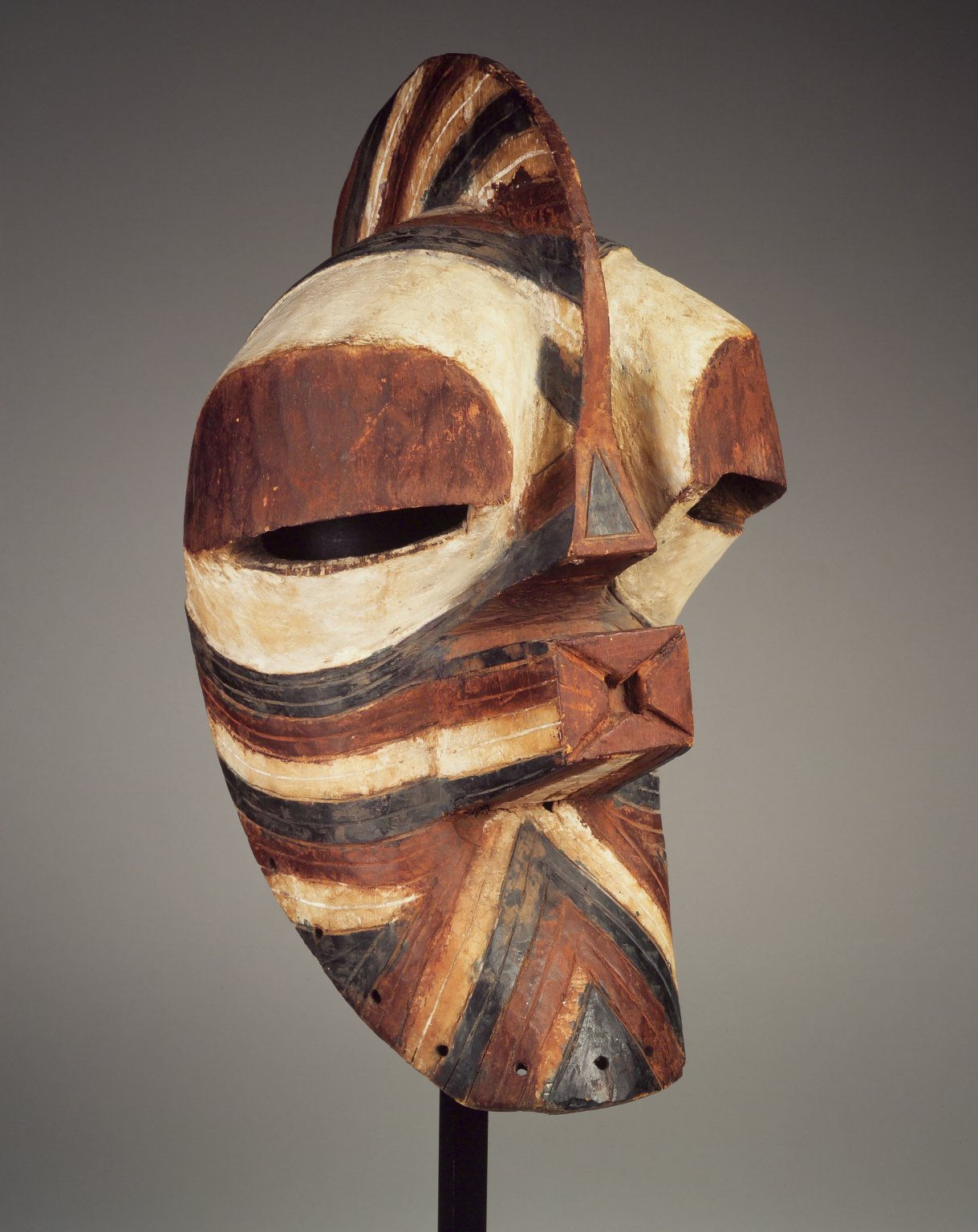
Painted mask

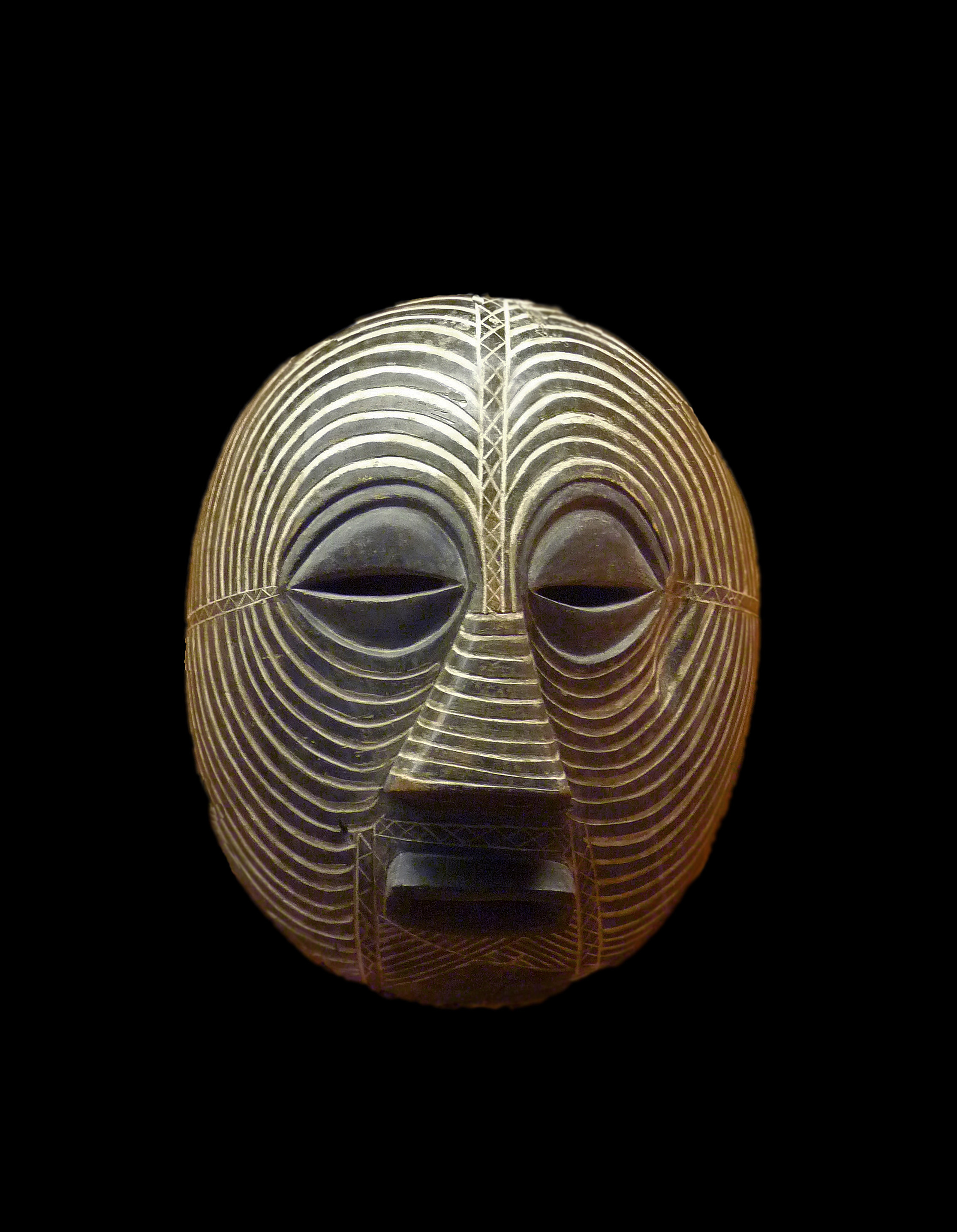
Rounded kifwebe with incised streaks of the Luba

== Bibliography ==
- Julien Volper, Under the influence of the Songye, Annales des Arts africains, 2012
- Alan P. Merriam, Kifwebe and other masked and unmasked societies among the Basongye, Africa-Tervuren, Tervuren, vol. 24, no 3, 1978
- François Neyt, Kifwebe: Un siècle de masques songye et luba, Cinq continents éditions, 2019
- Hersak, D. (n.d.). Further Perspectives on Kifwebe Masquerades. African Arts, 53(1), 6–23. https://doi.org/10.1162/afar_a_0051
