= Budya language =

Bantu language of DR Congo

Budya
- Native to: DR Congo
- Region: Kabinda Territory, Kasai
- Native speakers: (unknown; 4,000 cited 1955)
- Language family: Niger–Congo?: Atlantic–Congo; Benue–Congo; Bantoid; Bantu; Luban?; (?); Budya

Language codes
- ISO 639-3: None (mis)
- Glottolog: None
- Guthrie code: L.201

Budya
- Person: buini Budya
- People: beene Budya

Budya is a minor Bantu language. It is listed among Luban languages in Maho (2009).

Shona (Korekore) has a dialect of the same name (Budya/Budjga) in Zimbabwe.
