= Zela language =

Bantu language spoken in DR Congo

Zela
- Kizeela
- Native to: Democratic Republic of the Congo
- Language family: Niger–Congo?: Atlantic–Congo; Benue–Congo; Bantoid; Bantu; Luban; Luba languages; Kiluba; Zela

Language codes
- ISO 639-3: –
- Glottolog: None
- Guthrie code: L.331

Zela is a minor Bantu language of the Democratic Republic of the Congo. It is closely related to Luba-Katanga.
