= Sanga language (Bantu) =

Bantu language spoken in DR Congo

Sanga
- Kisanga
- Native to: Democratic Republic of Congo
- Ethnicity: Sanga people
- Native speakers: (430,000 cited 1991)
- Language family: Niger–Congo?: Atlantic–Congo; Benue–Congo; Bantoid; Bantu; Luban; Luba languages; Kiluba; Sanga

Language codes
- ISO 639-3: sng
- Glottolog: sang1331
- Guthrie code: L.35

Sanga, or Luba-Sanga, is a Bantu language of the Democratic Republic of the Congo. It is closely related to Luba-Katanga.

The Scottish missionary Dan Crawford translated the New Testament into Sanga, published in 1904; the whole Bible was published in 1928.
