= Binji language =

Bantu language of DR Congo

Binji
- Native to: Democratic Republic of the Congo
- Native speakers: (170,000 cited 2000)
- Language family: Niger–Congo?: Atlantic–Congo; Benue–Congo; Bantoid; Bantu; Luban; Songe–Binji; Binji

Language codes
- ISO 639-3: bpj
- Glottolog: binj1249
- Guthrie code: L.231

Binji is a Bantu language of eastern Democratic Republic of the Congo. Maho (2009) states that it is close to Songe, which is otherwise isolated within the Luban languages established by Ahmed (1995).

In the literature it has been confused with Mbagani, which goes by the same name. For instance, Guthrie assigned code L.22 "Binji" to what Maho labels Mbagani; in Maho, true Binji is L.231. The two languages are separated by 200 km.
