= Lwalu language =

Bantu language spoken in DRC

Lwalu
- Khongo
- Lwalwa
- Native to: Democratic Republic of the Congo, Angola
- Region: Kasai-Occidental province
- Native speakers: (21,000 cited 1971)
- Language family: Niger–Congo?: Atlantic–Congo; Benue–Congo; Bantoid; Bantu; Luban?; (?); Lwalu
- Dialects: Mbagani; Lwalwa

Language codes
- ISO 639-3: lwa
- Glottolog: lwal1238
- Guthrie code: L.221

Lwalu, also known as Lwalwa and Khongo, is a Bantu language of the Democratic Republic of the Congo and Angola. Its classification is uncertain: Nurse (2003), following Ahmed (1995), assigns all of Guthrie's L.20 languages to Luban, including Lwalu.

Maho (2009) lists L.22 Mbagani (which has no ISO code) as closely related. Mbagani is also called Binji, and has been confused in the literature with the Binji language. Ethnologue labels the area Maho assigns to Mbagani as Songe.
