= Hemba language =

Bantu language

Hemba
- Native to: Democratic Republic of the Congo
- Region: Katanga province
- Ethnicity: Hemba people
- Native speakers: (180,000 cited 2000)
- Language family: Niger–Congo?: Atlantic–Congo; Volta-Congo; Benue–Congo; Bantoid; Southern Bantoid; Bantu; Luban; Hemba–Kebwe; Hemba
- Dialects: Yazi

Language codes
- ISO 639-3: hem
- Glottolog: hemb1242
- Guthrie code: L.34, L.202

Hemba (Emba), also known as Eastern Luba, is a Bantu language of the Democratic Republic of the Congo. It is spoken by the Hemba people. Yazi may be a dialect.

== Dialects ==
There are more or less 7 Kihemba dialects according to the Linguistic Atlas of Central Africa:

- kinamunóno
- kinankúvu
- kinalêngwe
- kinamámbwe
- kinanyembo
- kinamuhóna
- kinayambúla
