= Bangubangu language =

Bantu dialect cluster of DR Congo

Bangubangu
- Native to: Democratic Republic of the Congo
- Region: Maniema province
- Native speakers: (170,000 cited 1995)
- Language family: Niger–Congo?: Atlantic–Congo; Benue–Congo; Bantoid; Bantu; Luban; Hemba (mostly); Luba (Mutingua); Bangubangu
- Dialects: Bangubangu proper; Mikebwe; Kasenga; Nonda; Hombo

Language codes
- ISO 639-3: bnx
- Glottolog: bang1350
- Guthrie code: D.27

Bangubangu is a Bantu dialect cluster spoken by the Bangubangu people of the Democratic Republic of the Congo.

The dialects are about 80% similar, apart from Hombo which is only 70% similar to the main dialect. It is possible that they are distinct languages. Christine Ahmed (1995) classifies the small "Bangubangu of Mutingua" apart from the rest, with the Luba rather than Hemba languages; this is presumably a Hombo dialect.

One of the earliest scholars to study Bangubangu was A. E. Meeussen, who wrote a brief description of the grammar of the language as a result of a visit to the area in 1951.
