= Luban languages =

Group of Bantu languages

Luban
- Luba–Songye
- Geographic distribution: S DR-Congo, C Zambia
- Linguistic classification: Niger–Congo?: Atlantic–Congo; Volta-Congo; Benue–Congo; Bantoid; Southern Bantoid; Bantu (Zone L); Luban

Language codes
- Glottolog: luba1253

The Luban languages are a group of Bantu languages spoken by the Luba people in the south of DRC Congo, established by Christine Ahmed (1995). They constitute half of Guthrie's Zone L. The languages, or clusters, along with their Guthrie identifications, are:

- Yazi (L20)
- Songe (Songye), Binji (L20)
- Hemba: Hemba (L20), Kebwe (L30), Bangubangu of Kabambare (D20)
- Luba (L30): Kaonde (L40), Kete (L20), Kanyok, Luba-Kasai (TshiLuba), Luba-Katanga (KiLuba)–Sanga–Zela, Bangubangu (of Mutingua only, D20)

The remaining L20 (Songe) languages, Lwalu, Luna, and Budya, presumably belong here.
