= Dharwas =

- Village of Pangi valley of Chamba district
- Interactive map of Dharwas
- Country: India
- State: Himachal Pradesh
- District: Chamba

Government
  - Type: State Government
  - Body: Government of Himachal Pradesh

Population (2011)
  - Total: 718

Languages
  - Official: Hindi
- Time zone: UTC+5:30 (IST)
- PIN: 176323
- Telephone code: 01897
- Vehicle registration: HP 45

Dharwas is the northernmost town of the state of Himachal Pradesh in India. It is located in the Chamba District at an elevation of 8,000 ft (2,400 m) above sea level. Dharwas is the largest and most populated area in the Pangi Valley, and trekking base camps are available for those on the Dalhousie-Kishtwar trekking route.

Dharwas is famous for the Tilmili natural mineral-water spring. It is believed that water from this spring was sent regularly to the Raja of Chamba. The Pangi Valley is the most remote valley of the Chamba district, and was described by Dr. J. Hutchison (in 1904) as follows:

"Pangi is unique in its grandeur and beauty: in this respect far surpassing any other portion of Chamba District. The scenery is sublime and imposing, and nature appears in her wildest and grandest moods. Everything is on a stupendous scale. The great river rolls along in a deep and narrow gorge, lashing itself into fury against the adamantine cliffs that confine it. Precipices spring from the brink, in places almost perpendicular, to a height of one or two thousand feet. On the lower ranges are grassy slopes of rich pasture with dense forests of pine and cedar, while high over all, the stern and majestic mountains, piled on one another, attain in altitude of 18,000 to 21,000 feet [5,500 to 6,400 m] rising far beyond the line of eternal snow. But all is not sublimity and grandeur. Every few miles the traveller reaches fairly open nooks of surpassing beauties, which may have been small lakes in some bygone age, while the river was cutting its way through a rocky barrier in front. There, the villages are chiefly to be found. These are few in number, and of small size, for the region is sparsely inhabited."

== Transport ==
The nearest railhead is at Pathankot in the state of Punjab and the nearest airport is at Gaggal. The nearest town is Killar, located in the deep, narrow gorge formed by the Chenab River; in Killar there are buses and taxis available for the trip to Dharwas.

The main road through Pangi Valley is the 170 km (110 mi) road link from Chamba to Killar via Saach Pass. One can also take the famous Leh–Manali Highway, although the road is in poor condition and occasionally closed to traffic. A trail leading to Sural Valley starts in Dharwas and ends in Zanskar.
