= Kete language =

Language

Kete
- Native to: Democratic Republic of the Congo
- Native speakers: 8,400 (2002)
- Language family: Niger–Congo?: Atlantic–Congo; Benue–Congo; Bantoid; Bantu; Luban; Luba; Kete

Language codes
- ISO 639-3: kcv
- Glottolog: kete1252
- Guthrie code: L.21

Kete is a Bantu language of the Democratic Republic of the Congo.
