= Luna language =

Bantu language spoken in DR Congo

Luna
- Northern Luba
- Native to: Democratic Republic of the Congo
- Native speakers: (undated figure of 50,000)
- Language family: Niger–Congo?: Atlantic–Congo; Benue–Congo; Bantoid; Bantu; Luban?; (?); Luna

Language codes
- ISO 639-3: luj
- Glottolog: luna1244
- Guthrie code: L.24

Luna (or Luna Inkongo) is a Bantu language of eastern Democratic Republic of the Congo. Assigned by Guthrie to a group called Songe (L.20), it is presumably one of the Luban languages established by Ahmed (1995), like most of the other Songe languages, though it was not specifically addressed. Ruhlen (1987) agrees in placing it with the Luban languages.

== Phonology ==
Luna consonants
		Bilabial	Labio-dental	Alveolar	Postalveolar/Palatal	Velar
Plosive	Voiceless	p		t		k
Plosive	Voiced	b		d		g
Affricate					t͡ʃ <c>	
Fricative			f	s	ʃ <x>	
		m		n		ŋ <ñ>
Semivowel					j <y>	w
Lateral				l		

/g/ is always prenasalized, and k is almost always palatalized. /p/ is realized as [Φ] if not following /m/.

Luna vowels
	Front	Mid	Back
Close	i		u
Close-mid	ɪ <ǐ>	ə	o
Open-mid	ɛ <e>	ə	ɔ <ô>
Open	a		ɒ <ǒ>

Stress typically falls on the penultimate syllable.

== Grammar ==
As is typical of Bantu languages, Luna utilizes a noun-class system defined by prefixes. The distal demonstrative 'that, yon' can be formed by adding the prefix yi- to the form. These are defined below:

Class prefixes
Class	Singular	Plural	Relative/pronominal singular	Relative/pronominal plural	Possessive singular	Possessive plural	Demonstrative
1	di-, bu-, bwa-, bo-, ku-	ma-, ø-	bu-, di-, ku-	a-	-adio, -abu, -aku	-ao	bobu, dedi, koku, aa
2	ka-	tu-	ka-	tu-	-ako	-atu	kaka, totu
3	ki-	bi-	ki-	bi-	-akio	-abio	k(i)eki, bebi
4	lu-, lo-, lwo-	N-	lu-	i-, y-, yi-	-alu	-ayo	lolu, yei
5	mu-	mi-	u- (before consonant), V̆- (before vowel)		-au	-ayo	ou, yei
6	mwo-	mie-	u- (before consonant), V̆- (before vowel)		-au	-ayo	ou, yei
7	mu-, ø-	ba-	u- (before consonant), a- (before vowel)	ba-	-anci, -enci (after i)	-abo	you, baba
8	ø-	ø-	u- (before consonant), a- (before vowel)	i-, y-, yi-	-anci	-abo	you, yei

Additionally, there are three locative/adverbial prefixes, these being ku- (at a place, motion towards something), mu- (motion into something, within something), and pa- (near to or on, approaching something).

Pronouns are prefixed to the front of a verb before the tense (except for objective form, which is placed directly before the verb root) and verb root. Possessive pronouns generally follow the noun they possess. They are as follows.

Personal pronouns
Person	Independent	Subject	Object	Negated	Possessive	Reflexive
1SG	meme	ngu-, n-, m-		ki-	-amene	mikyemi
2SG	owe	u-	ku-	ku-	-ebe	mikyebe
3SG	yei	u-, a-	mu-	ka-	-anci/-enci	mikyenci
1PL	coco	tu-		katu-	-ecu	mikyecu
2PL	nonu	nu-		kanu-	-enu	mikyenu
3PL	bobo	ba-		kaba-	-abo	mikyeabo

Ngu- is the first person singular subject prefix except before -di 'to be' (ndi 'I am') -bili 'to know' (mbili 'I know') and in the present tense progressive aspect of verbs, indicated by tana- (n-tana-nanga 'I am loving') and before object infixes. If there is an indirect and direct object, the indirect object is infixed in the object position and the direct object is moved to the end of the verb.The present and past progressive can also be expressed using the expressing -di mu + infinitive verb, literally to 'be in doing.' Relative pronouns are the same as subject pronouns when the subject, and moved to after the object pronoun when an object. (e. g. ngwakadya bukula 'I ate the flour' > bukula bunakadya 'the flour which I ate'). In relative clauses, ta- replaces the negative prefix.

n-kw-a-nanga
1SG.SUB-2SG.OBJ-PRES-love
I love you

Ma-la a-tw-aka-mona
NP1.PL-town NP1.PL.REL-1PL.SUB-PST.PRF-see
The towns which we saw

Various tense, aspect, and mood (TAM) prefixes may be added to a verb to modify its meaning. In the present progressive, past continuous, past perfective, past pluperfect, and simple future, the infinitive morpheme ku- must be placed before the first vowel of a vowel-initial verb, except for in -angata 'fetch' and -akala 'be'. In monosyllabic vowels, the first consonant and vowel (-VC) are repeated (e. g. -fwa 'die' > nfofwa 'I die', -ela 'throw' > ngwelela 'I throw') in the first person singular. If the root is not vowel-initial, the vowel -e- is inserted if the final syllable is -ya, and -o- is inserted in all other cases. The final vowel becomes -i in the hortative imperative. The prefix bi- indicates a meaning of 'so that, that, in order that' and the suffix -po 'please' 'is added to commands when addressing a superior.

Luna TAM prefixes
TAM	Prefix	Example	English
Simple present	a-, VC- (monosyllabic)	nwananga	I love
Present progressive	tana-	ntanananga	I am loving
Past continuous	ama-	namananga	I have loved (and am loving)
Recent past/present perfect	apu-	napunanga	I have loved
Past perfective	aka-	nakananga	I loved
Past pluperfect	akama-	nakamananga	I had loved
Affirmative past	a-	nananga	I did love
Simple future	na- (1SG naku-)	nakunanga	I will love
Definitive future	kye-	nkyenanga	I will love (at some definite time)
Conditional	xe-	nxenanga	I should, would love
Imperative	ø-	nanga	Love (command)
Hortative	-i	Anangi	Let him/her love

Additionally, complex verbs can be derived from simple verbs using prefixes.

Complex verbs
Form	Verb	Example	English
Simple		-xipa	kill
Reflexive	di-	-dixipa	kill oneself
Causative	-sa	-xipisa	cause to kill oneself
Relative	-la	-xipila	kill for another
Reciprocal/Habitual	-ñana	-xipañana	kill each other, kill habitually
Stative	-ka	-xipaka	be dead, in a killed state
Continuous	REDUPLICATED	-xipa xipa	keep on killing
Passive	-bwa	-xipibwa	be killed

There are a few adverbs that affix directly onto the verb:

Adverbs
Adverb	Meaning	Example
be-	please, used to soften commands, slightly, softly in non-imperatives	bedipula ncibo 'kindly open the house for me'
ki-	still	tukyananga 'we still love'
-po	please, if you please	namanangapo kantu ka sabanga 'I want a little bit of soap please'
mu- and bi-	the state in which, how	tebela mwencencayi 'behold how he works'

Cardinal numerals decline as both adjectives and simple numerals.

	Independent	Cardinal	Ordinal
1	kôci	-mo~mwe	-a buxi
2	pende	-bidi	-amubidi
3	exatu	-satu	-amusatu
4	enei	-nai	-amunai
5	etano	-tano	-amutano
6	esambanu	-sambomo	-amusambomo
7	sambwali	sambwali	-a sambwali
8	yenana	yenana	-a yenana
9	dibwa	dibwa	-a dibwa
10	iyomu	disangi	-a disangi

== Bibliography ==
- Westcott, William Henry (1923). Concise Grammar of Luna Inkongo (PDF). Bristol: Henry Hill Limited.
