= Kanyok language =

Bantu language of DR Congo

Kanyok
- Native to: Democratic Republic of the Congo
- Native speakers: (200,000 cited 1991)
- Language family: Niger–Congo?: Atlantic–Congo; Benue–Congo; Bantoid; Bantu; Luban; Luba languages; Kanyok

Language codes
- ISO 639-3: kny
- Glottolog: kany1247
- Guthrie code: L.32

Kanyok (Kanioka) is a Bantu language of the Democratic Republic of the Congo.
