= Luba people =

Ethnolinguistic group indigenous to the Democratic Republic of the Congo

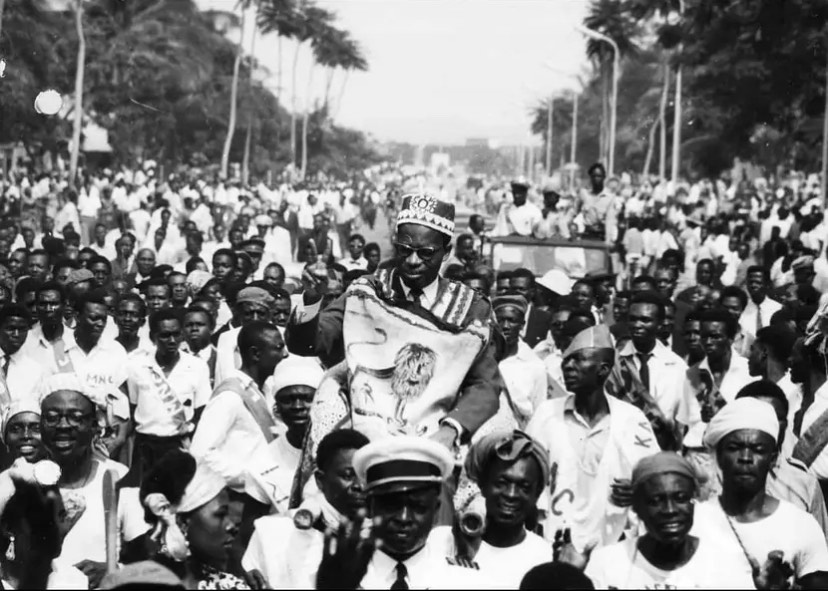
- Albert I former Mulopwe (Emperor) of South Kasai in 1961

Total population
- c. 28.8 million

Regions with significant populations
- Democratic Republic of the Congo Belgium; France United States

Languages
- Luba languages (Kiluba and Tshiluba); Swahili; French

Religion
- Christianity, Islam, African Traditional Religion, Bantu Mythology

Related ethnic groups
- Lunda people, Songye people, Bemba people and other Bantu peoples.

- Person: Mulubà
- People: Balubà
- Language: Kiluba
- Country: Baluba

The Luba people or Baluba are a Bantu ethno-linguistic group indigenous to the south-central region of the Democratic Republic of the Congo. The majority of them live in this country, residing mainly in Katanga, Kasaï, Kasaï-Oriental, Kasaï-Central, Lomami and Maniema. The Baluba consist of many sub-groups or clans.

The Baluba developed a society and culture by about the 400s CE, later developing a well-organised community in the Upemba Depression known as the Baluba in Katanga confederation. Luba society consisted of miners, smiths, woodworkers, potters, crafters, and people of various other professions. They found relative success over time, but this eventually caused their gradual decline with the Portuguese and Omani empires led or influenced invasions.

== History ==
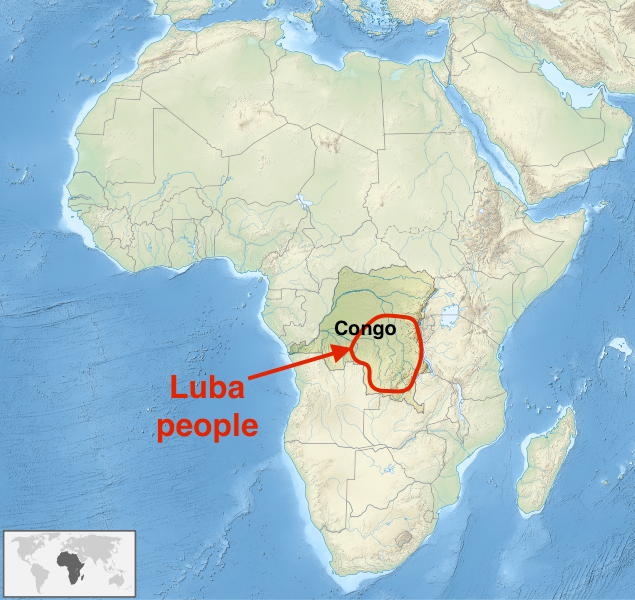
Geographical distribution of the Luba people (approx).

Archaeological evidence suggests that the Baluba had settlements around the lakes and marshes of the Upemba Depression by the 5th century CE. The evidence suggesting an advanced Iron Age society came from multiple sites. The Kamilambian, Kisalian and Kabambian series of evidence has been dated to be from 5th to 14th-century, suggesting a settled stable Luba culture over many centuries. Of these, the Kisalian period (8th to 11th century) pottery and utensils found. The finds dated to pre-8th century by modern dating methods are iron objects or pottery, thereafter copper objects appear.

The archaeological studies suggest that the Luba people lived in villages, in homes made of reeds and wattle, around the shores of numerous streams and lakes found in the Upemba Depression of Central Africa. This Depression has been historically flooded from the water runoff from southern Shaba highlands for parts of the year, its water bodies filled with papyrus islands and floating vegetation, the region drying out after rains ended. As a community, the Luba people constructed dams and dikes as high as 6 to 8 feet using mud, papyrus and other vegetation, to improve the marshy soil conditions for agriculture and stock fish during the long dry season.

The metal working techniques in use by the early Luba people included drawing out thin wires, twisting them, laminating them, and plaiting them into items such as necklaces, bracelets and hooks for fishing, needles for sewing and such.

These products attracted interest and demand from far off ethnic groups, creating trade opportunities and traders amongst the Luba people. This trade and all economic activity in the villages of Luba people had a tribute system, where a portion of the hunt, fish or produce was given to the lineage head or the people guarding the borders. These were natural borders, such as that created by waters of Lake Upemba, where passage across required channels and bridges. The movement into and out of the Luba people lands was thus controlled and taxed.

=== Luba Empire ===
Around 1500, possibly earlier, the Luba people began to coalesce into a single, unified state which historians now call the Kingdom of Luba or Luba Empire. The kingdom grew and became more sophisticated over time, reaching its peak between 18th to 19th-century. "...[I]ntegration into the forward edges of the expanding frontiers of international trade tore the Empire apart" in tandem with the advances of the 19th-century slave and ivory trade from Belgium and the Arab-Swahili chiefs such as Tippu Tip and Msiri, states Thomas Reefe.

A prominent sociopolitical system of the Luba Empire was the adoption of two layers of power, one of Balopwe (hereditary kingship) and another a council of royals or elders. These provided governmental stability through mutual balancing, when there were disputes of succession from death or other causes. This idea was adopted by the neighboring Lunda people and other ethnic groups.

The development and evolution of the Luba Empire, and the life of Luba people therein, has been unclear. This is in part because the Luba people were an entirely oral tradition culture where knowledge and records were held verbally without the use of a script. The orthography for the Luba language, called kiLuba, was invented in the 19th century; thus, early information about the Luba Empire has been derived from foreign documents. The later written texts suggest that the Luba people had developed sophisticated literary traditions around their concepts of good and evil, and integrated these concepts and their religious ideas into their legends about morality and people with power. For example, one legend relates to two kings, one called the red king Nkongolo Mwamba and other called the black king Ilunga Mbidi Kiluwe. According to the Luba people's oral history,

There are two kings, the Nkongolo Mwamba or red king, and Mbidi Kiluwe or black king. Nkongolo Mwamba is the violent, cruel and drunken despot; Mbidi Kiluwe is the gentle, just and refined one. Nkongolo is one who gets drunk, is ruthless, mocking, raping, robbing other, seen without manners. Mbidi Kiluwe is the opposite, one obsessed with good manners, thoughtful, who speaks carefully, is compassionate, keeps his distance, one with self control. Mbidi marries the sister of Nkongolo, and they have a son named Kalala. Nkongolo gets jealous and fearful of Kalala, and schemes to murder him. The guardian spirits, knowing the scheme, protect Kalala by (...)

— The rainbow legend, Luba people

The Luba people were a part of a large state in the 16th and 17th centuries, ruled by a Balopwe through delegation to regional chiefs. According to the oral tradition by inabanza Kataba, the empire expanded over time, with a major consolidation in the 18th century, partly triggered by the desire by rivals to control the salt and iron mines in the south. The Luba Empire was shielded from Portuguese and other colonial interests by the Lunda Empire, which lay to their southeast. This shielding was noted by David Livingstone in his travel memoirs, and likely blocked the Angolan traders from regular contact with the Luba people. Around the start of the 19th century, the oral traditions of both the Luba and Kanyok people suggest a major conflict, led by mutual raids. This conflict helped the Luba Empire grow, as its king Ilunga Sungu entered into new territories and formed marriage alliances. By 1810 when he died, his fame and reverence among the Luba people had peaked and the site of his royal court had become Kitenta (royal sacred village) where his spirit was venerated.

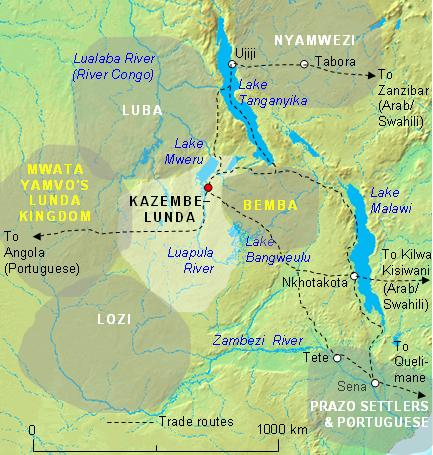
The Luba Empire (up left) in relationship to others and major trade routes, in the 19th century

After the death of Ilunga Sungu, Kumwimbe Ngombe came to power leading his warriors to expand southeast with contacts with traders from East Africa. After his victory, in accordance with Luba traditions, the conquered chiefs and rulers had to marry sisters or daughters from the Luba ruling family in order to tie them into a relationship and loyalty with the Luba Empire capital.

The ivory and slave trade had grown to the east of the Luba Empire by the mid-19th century; the natural supplies of ivory were exhausted whilst the international demand was increasing. The region under the Luba people had preserved herds of elephants. For example, the Kanyembo region had no ivory to sell. In 1840, after Kumwimbe Ngombe died of old age, king Ilunga Kabale succeeded to rule the Luba people until his death in 1870. By then, the region of Luba people and their empire covered much of what is now the southeastern Democratic Republic of Congo, extending for hundreds of kilometers from their early 19th-century heartland.

=== Guns, trade, and the colonial era ===
The success and wealth of Luba people grew in relative isolation because they were far from the eastern and western coasts of Africa, living in comparatively inaccessible terrain. The forests and mountains provided a natural border; additionally, their neighbors blocked direct and regular contact with distant international traders in order to monopolize the profits. This originally shielded the Luba from the effects of the slave trade. Later, however, the Luba people became victims of the slave demand and trading, in some cases selling people from their own lands as slaves. By the 1850s, slavers began intruding into the Luba people lands. Despite a ban on slave trading in the Western world, the eastern and northern parts of Africa, led by Arab-Swahili slave and ivory traders entered into the eastern and northeastern regions of the Luba Empire. These intruders came with guns, experience of running caravans, and other tools of war. Although the weapons of the Luba people were not primitive (with implements such as blades and bows), the opposing forces had more advanced weapons. David Livingstone, in his memoir, wrote how amazed the Luba people were with the guns, as they thought they were tobacco pipes; the firearm was the primary tool used against large populations of the Luba. Slave and ivory trader, Tippu Tip for example wrote, "Luba had no guns, their weapons were bows and arrows; guns they did not know. The guns we have with us, they asked us, 'Are they pestles?' The conquest of the Luba people was swift."

Msiri, a Tanzanian operator supplying ivory and slaves to the Sultan of Zanzibar, raided and took over the southeastern Shaba region of Luba people. Its other side, the southwestern borders were breached by the Ovimbundu ivory and slave hunters operating with the Portuguese. While slaves could no longer be exported to the Americas, they were used for work and caravan operations within Africa. Breaches from all sides, by better equipped armies, weakened the Luba Empire rapidly between 1860 and 1880s, and accelerated its demise. In parallel, the news of disarray and confusion from many corners of the Luba Empire, led to internal disputes on succession and strategy when the Luba king Ilunga Kabale died in 1870.

By 1868, Said bin Habib el-Afifi had raided Luba operations and with force taken 10,500 pounds of copper. By 1874, another Arab-Swahili trader Juma bin Salum wad Rakad, and a friend of Tippu Tip, had entered into an agreement with one of the Ilunga Kabale's son and established the base of his elephant hunting and ivory trade operations in the heart of the Luba people's lands. The Arab-Swahili raids, such as those by Tippu Tip, into Luba people's lands were organized with Nyamwezi subordinates and slave armies. These raids and attacks by the outsiders also introduced smallpox into the Luba population.

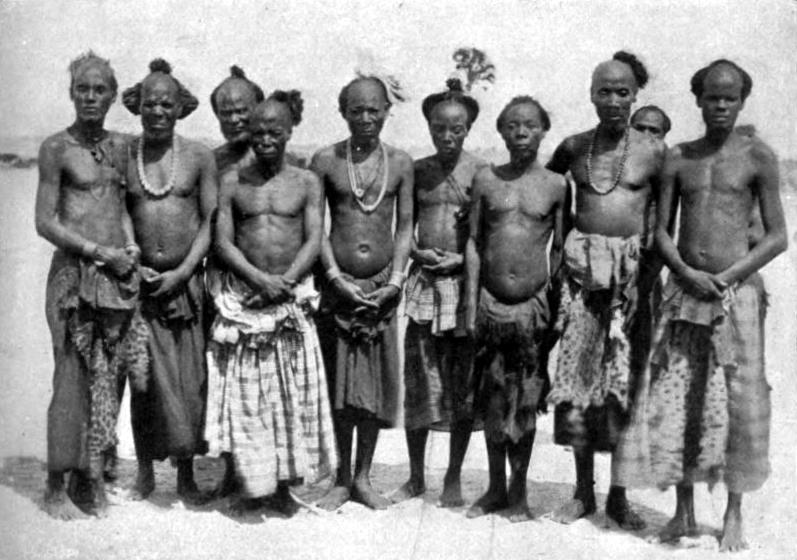
Baluba leaders, c. 1905

In 1885 Leopold II, king of Belgium, secured European recognition of his right over the territories that became what is now the Democratic Republic of the Congo. The first Belgian expedition into the Luba people's region arrived in 1891. The king of Belgium, impressed with the accomplishments of Tippu Tip in getting resources from central Africa, appointed him the governor of the region that included the Luba people's territory.

The Luba people were forced to work in the copper and gemstone mines of the Katanga province during the Belgian rule, causing numerous mining-related deaths. They rebelled in 1895, then again from 1905 to 1917, and these insurrections were subdued through military intervention.

=== Post-colonial era ===
In 1960, the Belgians, faced with rising demand for independence and an end to colonial rule, granted independence to the Democratic Republic of the Congo. That same year, Katanga Province, which was home to a considerable number of Luba, attempted to secede under Moise Tshombe as the State of Katanga. The Luba were divided, with one faction under Ndaye Emanuel supporting the secession, and another under Kisula Ngoye supporting the central government.

United Nations peacekeepers in Congo, as part of the ONUC force came into conflict with the Luba. On 8 November 1960, an Irish Army patrol was ambushed outside Niemba. In the fighting, the Irish soldiers killed 25 Baluba and 9 of the 11 Irish were killed.

When Tshombe's breakaway regime collapsed in 1965, Kisula Ngoye became the liaison between the Luba people and the central government.

== Religion ==
=== Traditional ===
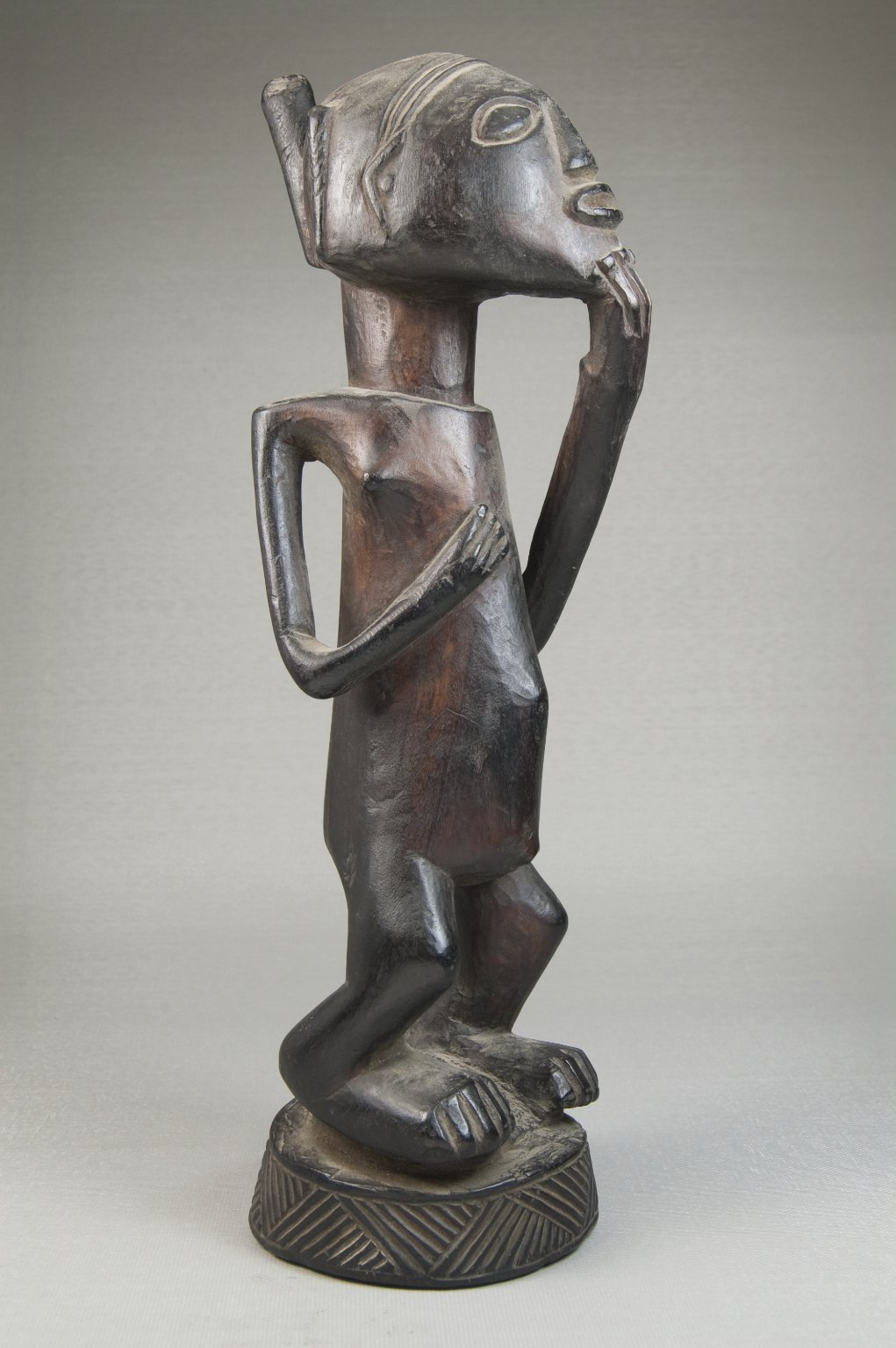
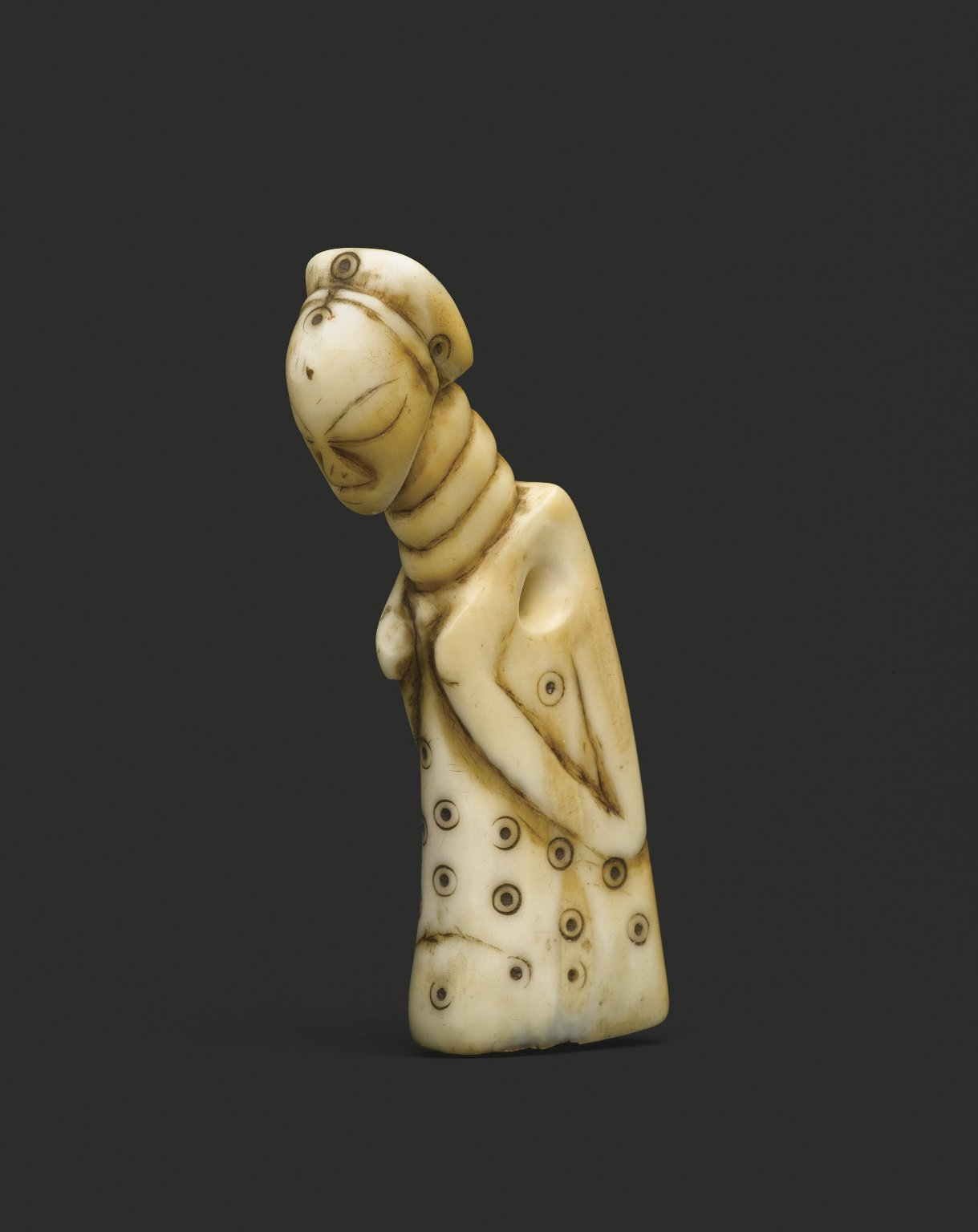
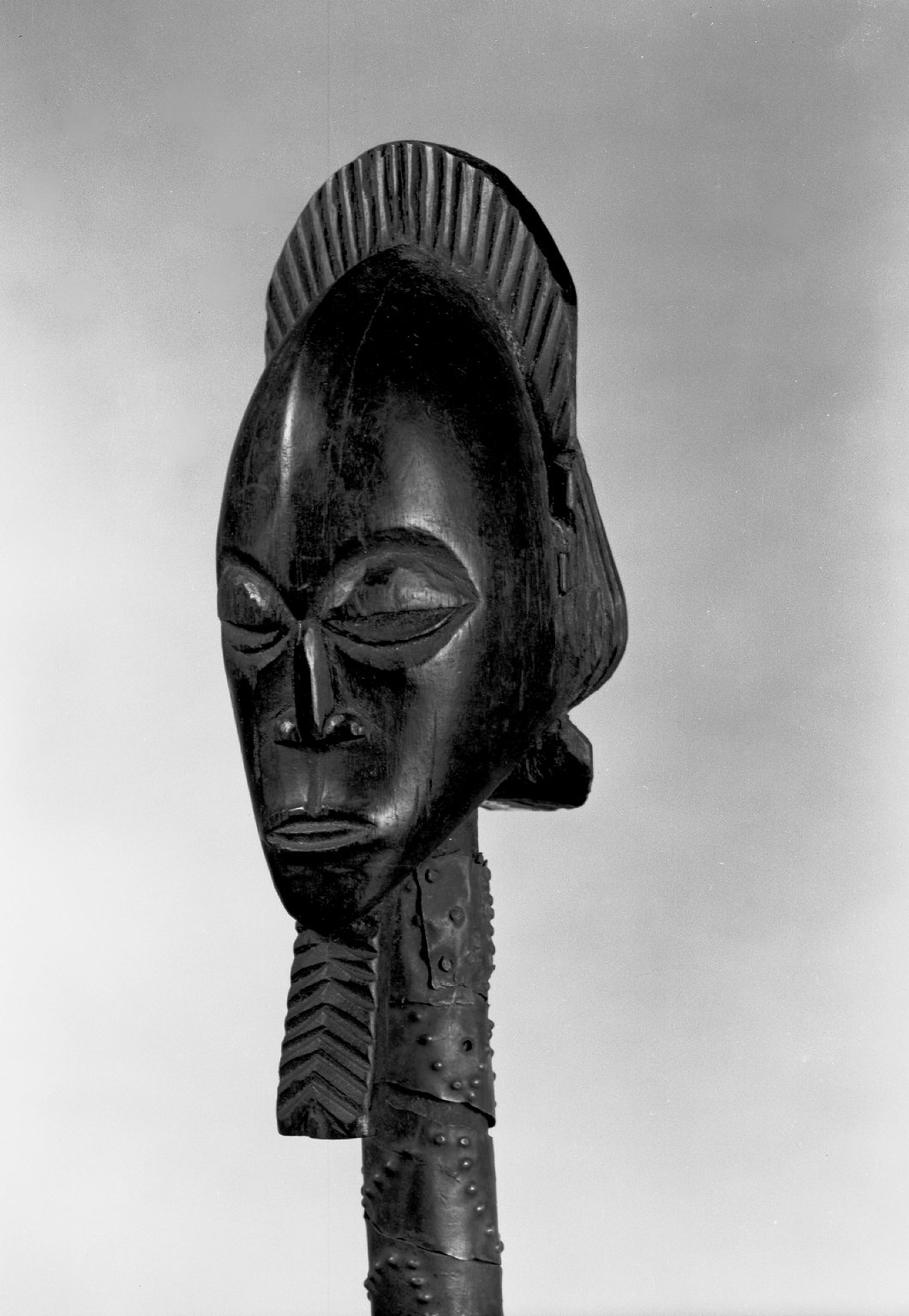
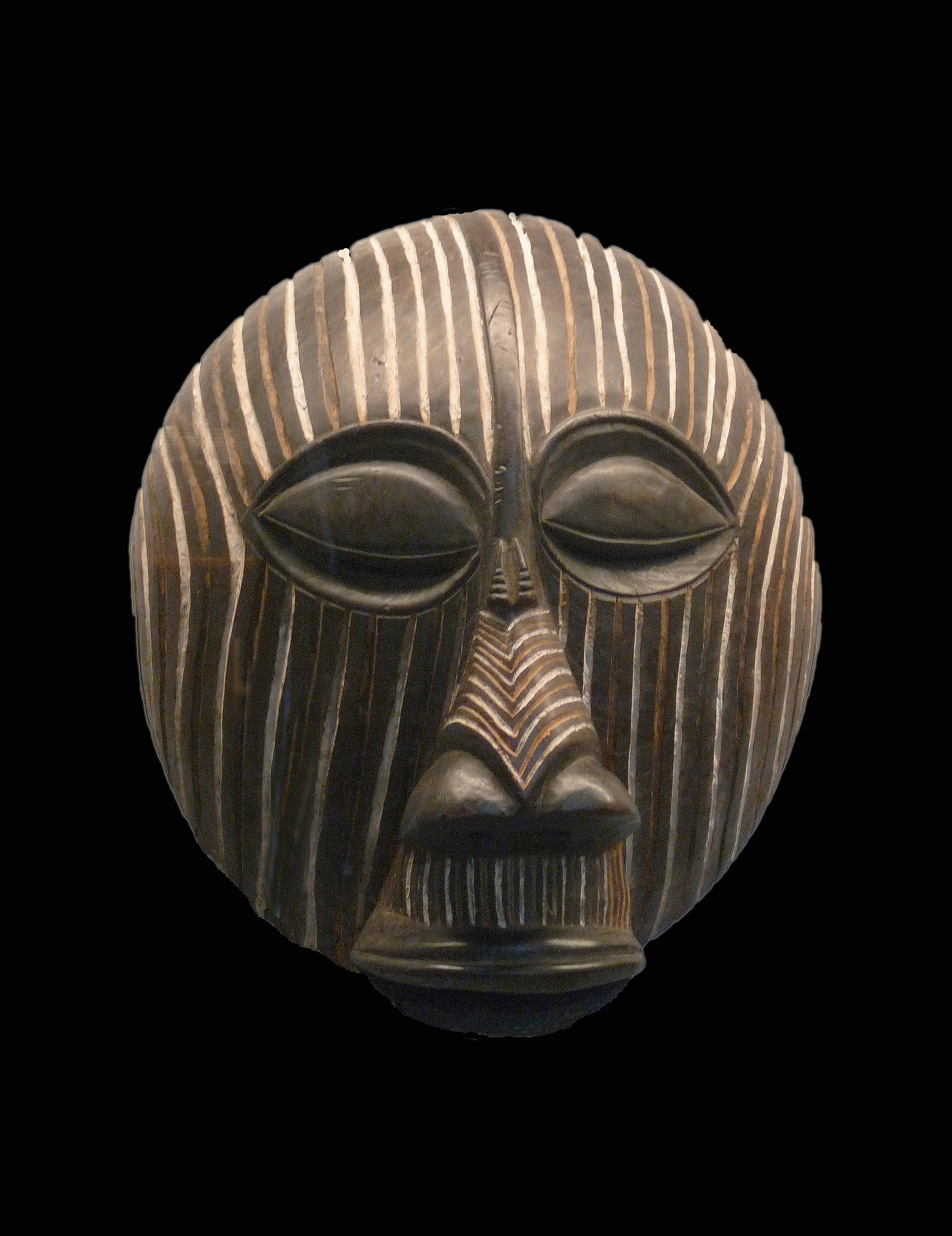
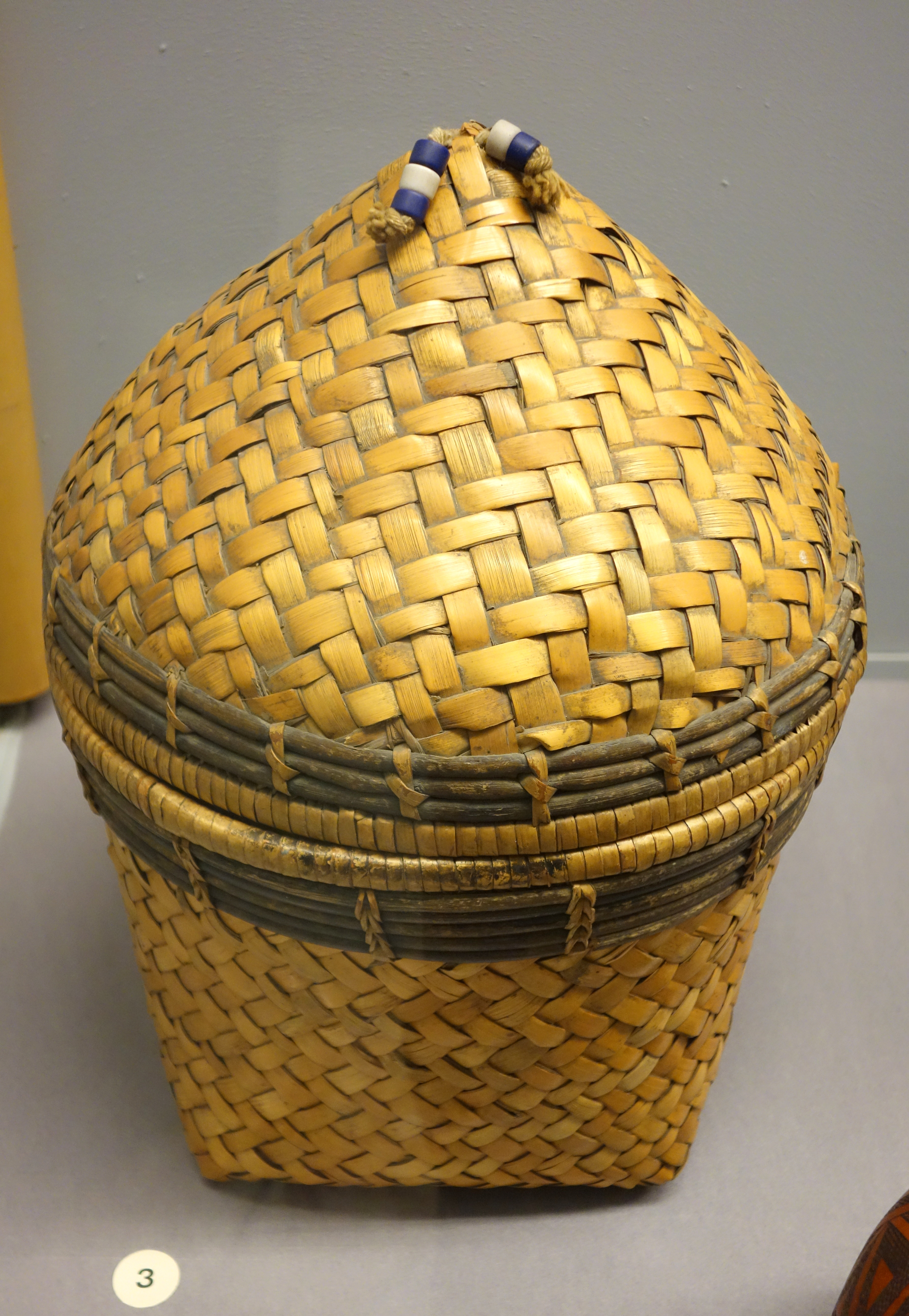
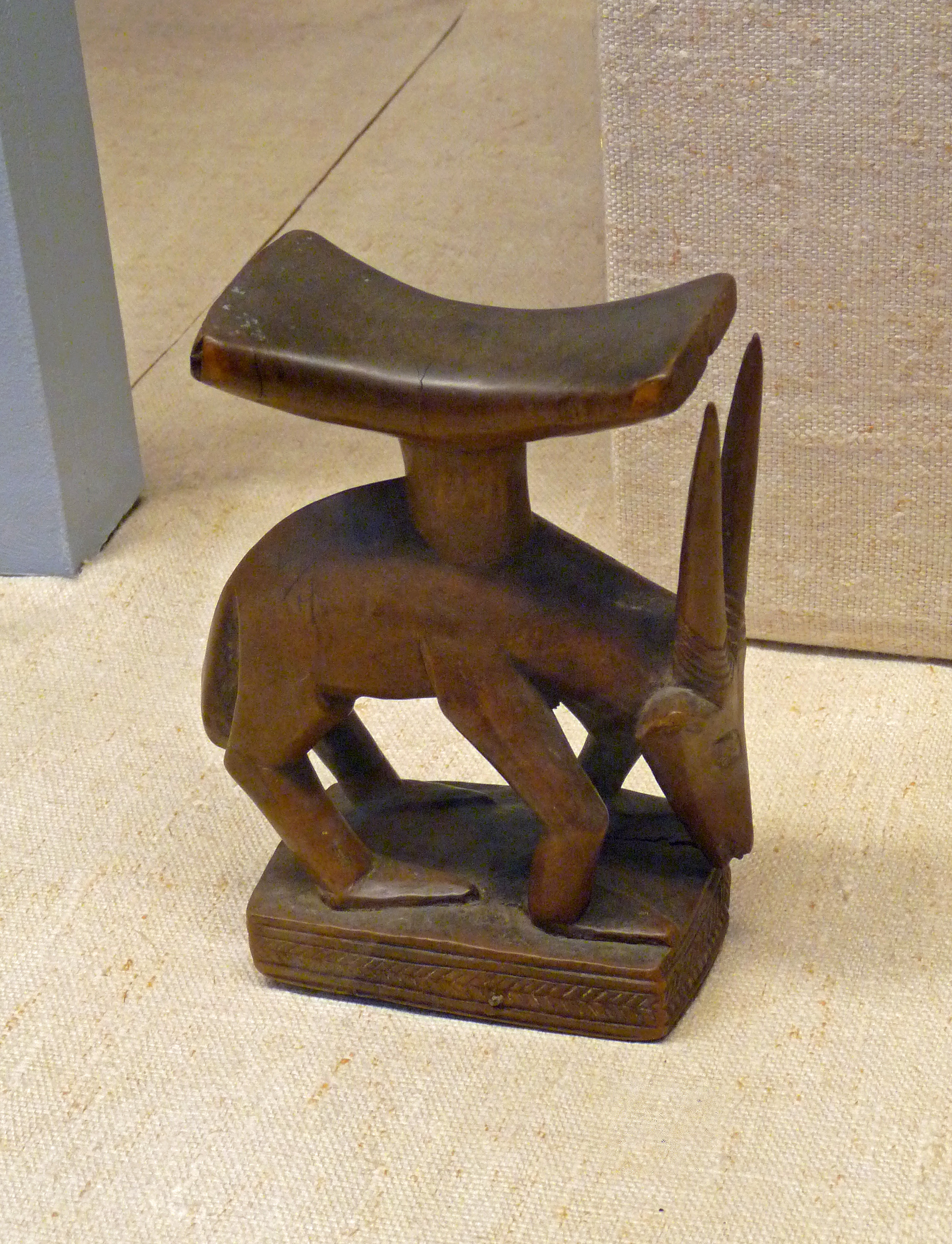
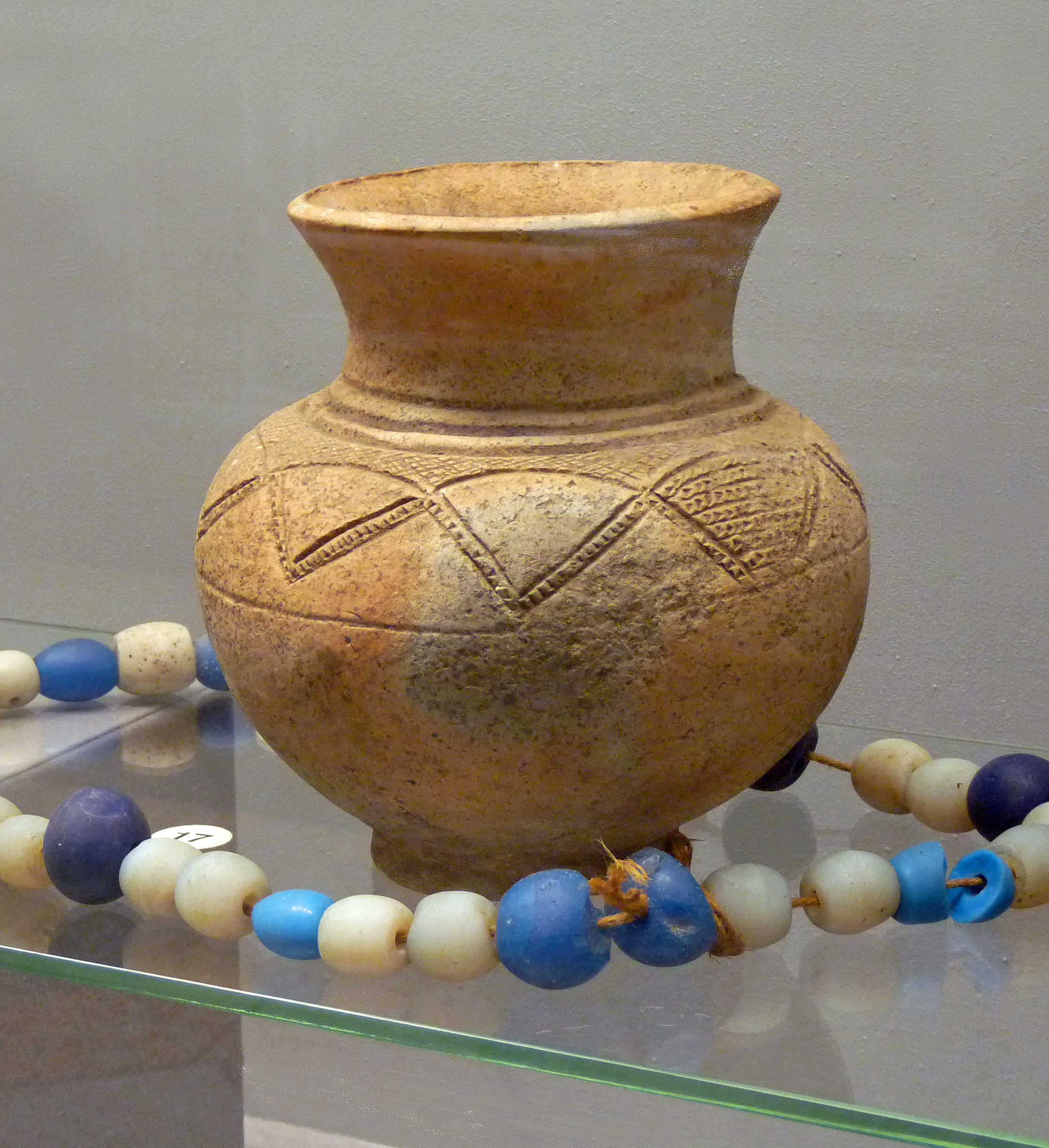
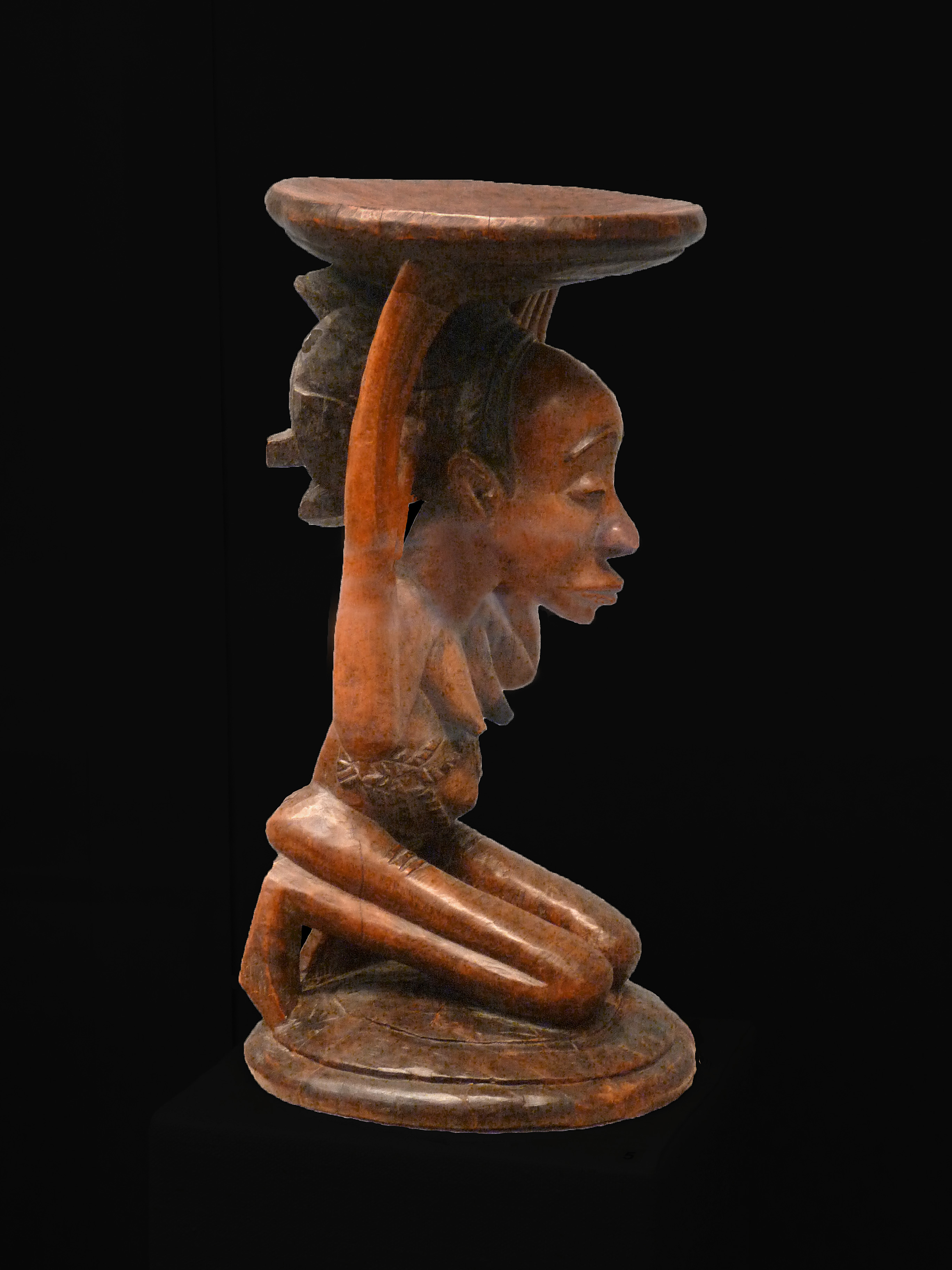
The artwork of Luba people

The traditional religious beliefs of the Luba people included the concept of a Shakapanga or a Universal Creator, a Leza or the Supreme Being, a natural world and a supernatural world. The supernatural world was where Bankambo (ancestral spirits) and Bavidye (other spirits) lived, and what one joined the afterlife if one lived an Mwikadilo Muyampe (ethical life). The Luba religions accepts the possibility of communion between the living and the dead.

The religious life included prayers, community singing, dances, offerings, rites of passage rituals and invocations. These rituals and services had intermediaries for rites such as Nsengha or Kitobo (priests). In addition, for anxiety and ailments, a Nganga or Mfwintshi (healer) were in service who would perform Lubuko (divination). The religious thought did not limit itself to rituals, but included ideas of a good personhood, good heart, dignity for others and self-respect. The religious code of civil life and goodness affected the Luba social life.

=== Christianity ===
Christianity was introduced to the Luba people by colonizers who came with the Belgium colonial rule. Some of these missionaries, such as William Burton, performed ethnographic research, starting with an aggressive projective research and teaching the Luba people.

Luba Catholics would later produce the famed Missa Luba, a form of the Latin Mass inculturated in the Luba arts and expression. This would lay the groundwork for the Zaire Use, a full-on rite of the Mass based on (and used primarily in) the Congo.

=== Islam ===
According to a 2011 source, an estimated 12% of Luba are adherents of Islam. Islam spread among the Luba during the 19th and 20th century due to increasing contact with the Swahili.

== Culture ==
The Luba people tended to cluster in single street villages, with homes with rectangular thatched roofs on both sides of the street whose lineage is usually related. The homes were in the savanna and forests. They hunted, fished in abundant waters near them, gathered food such as fruits from the wild and had mastered agriculture. In contemporary era, they grow cassava, corn, raise livestock. Some Luba carve wood and produce artist handicrafts.

=== Art ===
Art was well-developed in the Luba culture. Pottery, articles crafted from iron (such as axes, bows and spears), wooden staff and carvings and parts clad in sheets of copper were routinely produced. A notable artform of the Luba people was the Mwadi, where the male ancestors were represent in their female incarnations of the ancestral kings.

According to scholars such as Daniel Kabozi, some of the intricate art works of the Luba people were mnemonic devices, a form of symbolic coded script to aid preserving information and recalling the history and knowledge of the Luba.

The Luba people, according to art historian Mary Roberts, developed "one [of] the most complex and brilliant mnemonic systems in Africa for recording royal history, king lists, migrations, initiation esoterica and family genealogies", such as the Lukasa memory board. This artwork are now found in numerous museums of the world.

== Notable Luba people ==
- Herita Ilunga, footballer
- Kalala Ilunga, Emperor
- Albert Kalonji, politician, elected Mulopwe of Kasai
- Bill Clinton Kalonji, musician
- Jean-Bedel Mpiana wa Tshituka, musician founder of Ndombolo
- Grand Kalle, musician
- Pepe Kalle, musician
- Nico Kasanda, musician
- Oscar Kashala, politician
- Évariste Kimba, journalist and politician
- Gabriel Kyungu wa Kumwanza, politician
- Dieudonné Kayembe Mbandakulu, Lieutenant General of the Armed Forces of the Democratic Republic of Congo
- Tshala Muana, musician
- Ndaye Mulamba, footballer
- Dikembe Mutombo, basketball player
- Jean Kalala N'Tumba, footballer
- John Numbi, Military General in DRC
- Jason Sendwe, politician ex President of Balubakat
- Laurent Desire Kabila, 3rd president of DRC ex President of Jeunesse Balubakat
- Étienne Tshisekedi wa Mulumba He founded the Union for Democracy and Social Progress (UDPS) in 1982, the country's first opposition party, and remained its leader throughout his life.
- Joseph Kabila Kabange, 4th president of DRC
- Félix Antoine Tshisekedi Tshilombo, 5th president of DRC
