= Muya, Democratic Republic of the Congo =

Commune of the city of Mbuji-Mayi in the Democratic Republic of the Congo

Muya
- Commune
- Location within Democratic Republic of the Congo
- Coordinates: 6.109°S 23.620°E
- Country: Democratic Republic of the Congo
- Province: Kasaï-Oriental
- City: Mbuji-Mayi

Muya is a commune of the city of Mbuji-Mayi in the Kasaï-Oriental Province in the Democratic Republic of the Congo.

It is one of five communes in Mbuji-Mayi, along with Bipemba, Dibindi, Diulu, and Kanshi. It is the second-smallest of the Mbuji-Mayi communes, at 12.8 km^{2} (4.9 sq mi).

A campus of the Université officielle de Mbujimayi opened in the commune in 2025.
