= Diulu =

Commune of the city of Mbuji-Mayi in the Democratic Republic of the Congo

- Commune
- Location within Democratic Republic of the Congo
- Coordinates: 6°6′47″S 23°36′3″E
- Country: Democratic Republic of the Congo
- Province: Kasaï-Oriental
- City: Mbuji-Mayi

Diulu is a commune of the city of Mbuji-Mayi in the Kasaï-Oriental Province in the Democratic Republic of the Congo.

It is one of five communes in Mbuji-Mayi, along with Bipemba, Dibindi, Kanshi and Muya. It is the smallest of the Mbuji-Mayi communes both by area, at 8.2 km^{2} (3.2 sq mi), and by population. It is separated by a ravine from the commune of Bipemba, with a road bridge connecting the communes opened in 2025.

The main campus of the Université officielle de Mbujimayi is located in the commune. Illegal diamond mining also takes place in residential parts of the commune.
