= Kanshi =

Kanshi may refer to:

- Kanshi (poetry) (漢詩), Chinese poetry written by Japanese
- Kanshi, Fujian (坎市镇), town in Yongding District, Longyan, Fujian, China
- Kanshi, India, town in Meerut, Uttar Pradesh, India
- Kanshi, Mbuji-Mayi, a commune in the city of Mbuji-Mayi
