= Congolese Alliance for Agriculture and Development =

Congolese Alliance for Agriculture and Development Alliance Congolaise pour l'Agriculture et le Développement
- Abbreviation: CAAD
- Leader: Constantin Kasongo Munganga
- President: José Kasongo Ilunga
- General Secretary: Innocent K. Ntambua
- First Secretary: Ghisain Veron Nzuzi Nkodia
- Founded: 30 August 2012 (age 14)
- Headquarters: Lemba, Kinshasa
- Ideology: Social Democracy
- Political position: Left-wing

The Congolese Alliance for Agriculture and Development (CAAD) (French: Alliance Congolaise pour l'Agriculture et le Dévelopment) is a political party in the Democratic Republic of the Congo.

== History ==
The Congolese Alliance for Agriculture and Development was founded by Professor Kasongo Munganga on August 30, 2012.

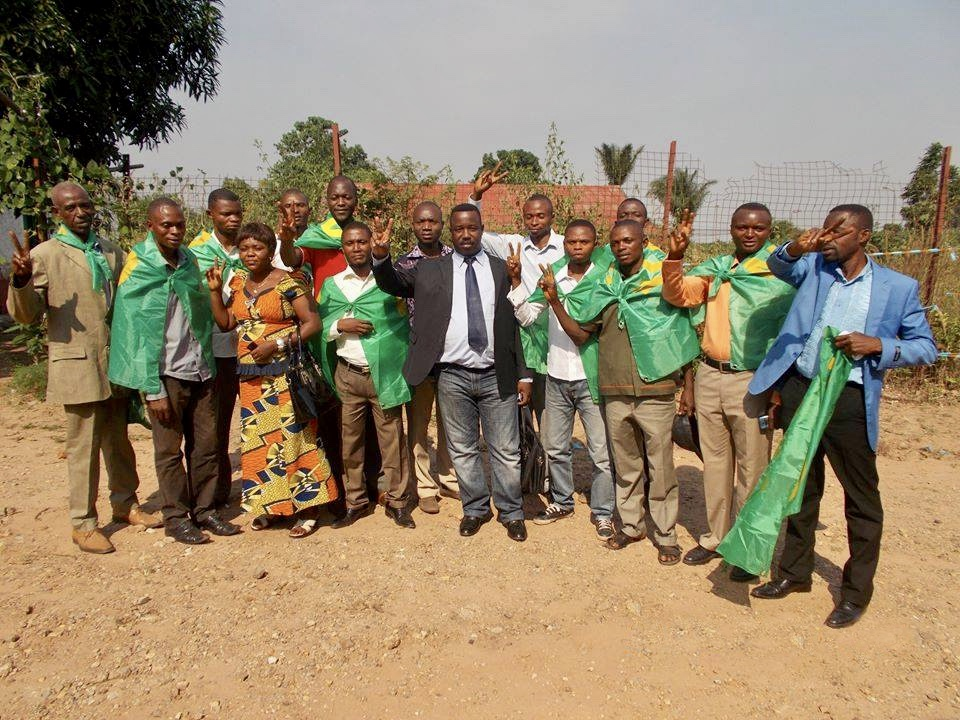
Inauguration of Congolese Alliance for Agriculture and Development (CAAD in short)

When he retired from the Central Bank on 2004, Kasongo began his political activism by joining the Civil Society led by friend Professor Bahati Lukwebo. Civil Society is apolitical. On 2005, he joined the presidential political party (PPRD) through its General Secretary, Camarade Vital Kamerhe. Next, he pulled his son Dicko Kasongo from UDPS and introduced him to Vital Kamerhe who appointed him as an Implanter, then he will be retained on the electoral list for the legislative. Actually, he is the Chairperson of the province of Kasai-Oriental in the parliamentary. Katanda Territory elected Kasongo in the parliamentary under the umbrella of RCD/N led by Roger Lumbala on November 28, 2011. Next year, Kasongo's parliamentary mandate had almost been invalidated when the president of their party RCD/N, Roger Lumbala had joined the armed rebellion of the M23. He then responded to the call of his constituency by resigning from RCD/N. On August 30, 2012, he created a new political party, Congolese Alliance for Agriculture and Development (CAAD). As the Caucus Chair of the province of Kasai-Oriental in the Congolese National Assembly, Kasongo Munganga thanked the President Kabila for keeping choosing the prime minister from his province.
