= Katanda =

Katanda may refer to:

- Katanda, Russia, a locality in the Altai Republic
- In the Democratic Republic of the Congo:
  - Katanda Territory, an administrative division of Kasaï-Oriental province
    - Katanda, the town that is its administrative center
  - Katanda, a village in Beni Territory of North Kivu province
  - Katanda, an archeological site in the upper Semliki valley
