= Kanshi, Mbuji-Mayi =

Commune of the city of Mbuji-Mayi in the Democratic Republic of the Congo

Kanshi
- Commune
- Location within Democratic Republic of the Congo
- Coordinates: 6.147°S 23.608°E
- Country: Democratic Republic of the Congo
- Province: Kasaï-Oriental
- City: Mbuji-Mayi

Kanshi is a commune of the city of Mbuji-Mayi in the Kasaï-Oriental Province in the Democratic Republic of the Congo.

It is one of five communes in Mbuji-Mayi, along with Bipemba, Dibindi, Diulu and Muya. It is the second-largest of the Mbuji-Mayi communes by area, at 28.8 km^{2} (11.1 sq mi), but the second-smallest by population. It was developed between 1948 and 1959.

Illegal diamond mining has occurred in the commune. Erosion, due to rain and illegal mining, is a serious problem within the commune.
