= Alphonse Ngoyi Kasanji =

Congolese politician

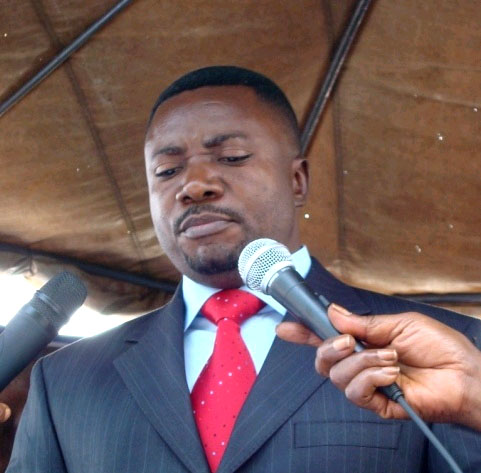
- Alphonse Ngoy Kasanji on16 October 2009

Governor of Kasaï Oriental Province
- In office 16 March 2007 – 8 May 2019
- Preceded by: Dominique Kanku
- Succeeded by: Jean Maweja Muteba

Personal details
- Born: 12 February 1963 (age 63) Gandajika, Lomami Province, DRC
- Occupation: Businessman, politician

Alphonse Ngoyi Kasanji (born 12 February 1963) is a teacher, businessman and politician who was governor of Kasaï-Oriental from 2007 to 2019.

== Life ==
Alphonse Ngoyi Kasanji is the son of Anaclet Mukendi Wa Kanda and Bernadette Mulanga. He was born on 12 February 1963 in Ngandajika, Kasai Oriental. He was educated in Kasai Oriental. He married Odette Mbuyi, and they had seven children. For some time he was a teacher, then became a diamond dealer. He became president of the Congolese Diamond Federation (FECODI). He branched out into bakeries and fruit juice canneries, and founded the RTOP radio and television channel.

Ngoyi Kasanji was elected governor of Kasai Oriental on 21 March 2007. Alphonse Ngoyi Kasanji was governor of Kasaï Oriental Province from 29 October 2015 to 8 May 2019.

== Sources ==
- Mbata Tshini, Serge, Biographie du gouverneur de la province, Kasaï-Oriental
