= Mbuji-Mayi River =

River in Democratic Republic of the Congo

Coordinates: 6.03333°S 23.76667°E

The Mbuji-Mayi River, also spelt Bushmaie, Bushimaie, Bushimay or Mbushimaie, (Swahili: Mto Mbuji-Maji) is a river in the Democratic Republic of the Congo, a major tributary of the Sankuru River. It flows northwards from the Kapanga Territory in the province of Lualaba to the province of Kasaï-Oriental, where it is the namesake of the city of Mbuji-Mayi.

The Upper Mbuji-Mayi is called the Nkalany River, and was were the Lunda Empire originated.
