= Kasongo Munganga =

Congolese politician

Professor Constantin Kasongo Munganga Chairperson of CAAD
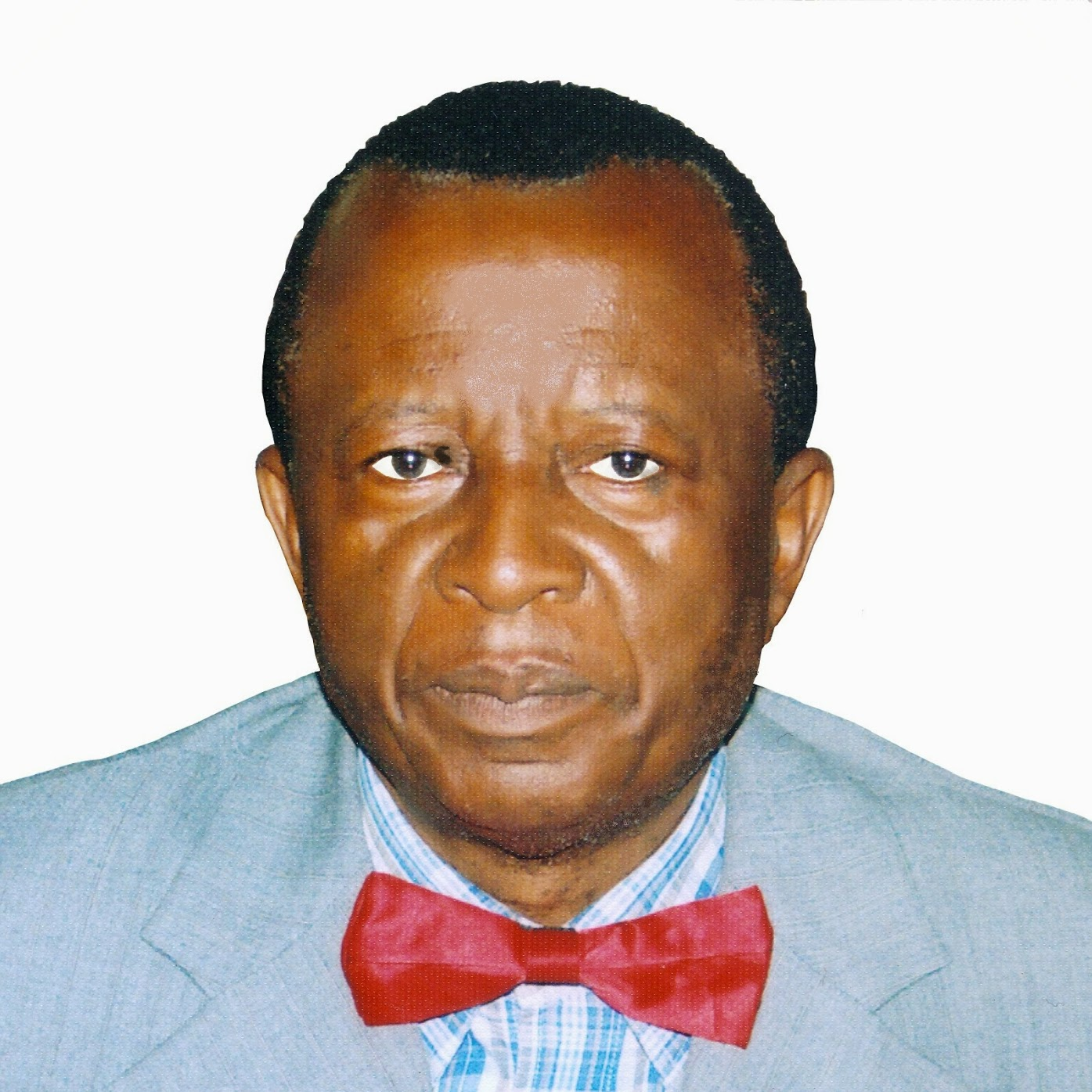

National deputy
- Incumbent
- Assumed office 28 November 2011
- Preceded by: Bashala Kantu wa Milandu

Caucus Chair of Kasai-Oriental Province in the Congolese National Assembly
- Incumbent
- Assumed office 28 November 2011
- Preceded by: Kazadi Nyembwe

Chairperson of CAAD
- Incumbent
- Assumed office 24 March 2012

CEO of CEEC
- In office 2006–2008

CEO of SOFIDE
- In office 1998–2000

Personal details
- Born: 22 July 1944 (age 82) Ngulungu, Katanda Territory, Kasai-Oriental, Democratic Republic of the Congo.
- Party: Congolese Alliance for Agriculture and Development (CAAD)
- Spouse: Marie-Antho Mbwaki Kasongo
- Children: 7
- Education: University of Kinshasa

Constantin Kasongo Munganga is a politician and monetarist from the Democratic Republic of Congo. He holds a Ph.D. in economics. In 2011, he was elected MP for the constituency of Katanda Territory, in the Kasai-Oriental province. He is the former Chief Executive Officer of the Center for Expertise, Evaluation, and Certification of Precious and Semi-Precious Mineral Substances, CEEC in short. Television audiences nicknamed him "The Man With The Red Knot" because of his appearance on media. Since 1975, he has taught at the Institut Supérieur de Commerce of Kinshasa.

== Early life ==
On Saturday, July 22, 1944, Constantin Kasongo was born in Ngulungu, Katanda Territory. His father, Ilunga Munsensa, was polygamous and died before he was born. He lost his mother at an early age. As an orphan, he could no longer attend school in Katanda. Therefore, he went to continue his middle school in Lusambo. Then, he joined his big brother Gaspard Kazadi who were a farmer in Ngandajika to attend high school. We all know that the first Congolese doctor is a gynecologist, Doctor Ilunga Felicien. But all didn't that he's also Kasongo's big brother who sponsored relocation from the province of East Kasai to the capital Kinshasa, on 1962. Once arrived in Kinshasa, Kasongo registered to College Albert 1st (actually Boboto College), where he graduated from high school, majoring in Poetry and Rhetoric of literature. Afterward, he earned an Economics degree at Lovanium University, now the University of Kinshasa.

== Education ==
- Early education and High school
- Higher education

== Early education and High school ==
=== Kasai-Oriental Province ===
- Elementary school: in Katanda
- Middle school: in Lusambo
- High School: College Saint George in Ngadanjika

=== Kinshasa ===
He moved to Kinshasa in 1962 for school reasons.

- High School: Boboto College

== Higher education ==
=== Undergraduate ===
Bachelor of Economics from Lovanium University (1970)

=== Graduate ===
- Master in Development Economics from the African Institute for Economic Development and Planning (IDEP) Dakar, Senegal (1979-1982)
- Master in Monetary Economic at The Catholic University of Louvain in Louvain-la-Neuve, Belgium (1982–83)
- Diploma of Advanced Economic Studies in Monetary, Financial and International Economics at the University of Kinshasa.
- Ph.D. in economics at the University of Kinshasa, after defending publicly his doctoral thesis on "mutations of economic structures for a self-centered and auto-dynamic development of the country".

=== Publication ===
- Tentatives de Stabilisation Économique au Zaïre,' is available on JSTOR
- La problématique des programmes d’ajustement structural durable en Afrique : contraintes d’appropriation et leçons de l’expérience congolaise de 1975 à 2012», Doctoral thesis on "mutations of economic structures for a self-centered and auto-dynamic development of the country".

== Employment /Occupation ==
- Caucus chair of the Kasai-Oriental in the Congolese National Assembly (2012 to Dec 2018).
- National deputy in the Congolese National Assembly for the constituency of Katanda Territory, in the province of Kasai-Oriental (2011 to Dec 2018).
- CEO of the Center for Expertise, Evaluation, and Certification of Precious and Semi-Precious Mineral Substances, CEEC in short, (2006 to 2008).
- CEO of SOFIDE appointed by the Central Bank of the Congo (1998-2000).
- Financial Analyst at the Central Bank of the Congo (1992 and retired on 2004).
- Economics Professor in charge of Money and Banking courses at Institut Supérieur de Commerce (1974 to Present).
- Economic and Financial Advisor at the Interior and Security Ministry (1970-1974).

== Family ==
On Saturday December 9, 1972, Constantin Kasongo married Antoinette Mbwaki with live music performed by the famous Tabu Ley Rochereau. They had seven children (5 sons and 2 daughters).

- J.B. Kasongo Musenga, Congolese Ambassador to Egypt since 2022

== Social in Katanda ==
- The construction of Kasongo Munganga Stadium in Katanda Territory in 2014
- He installed the first broadcast Station in Katanda in 2013.
- The construction of Health Care Center Katanda in 2012.

== Professional in Kinshasa ==
- At the time he was the CEO of the CEEC, to promote the diamond industry, gold, coltan and other precious and semi-precious mineral substances, his management introduced several authorizations to the shareholders. Once the government approved through its minister Kalele Kabila, this new CEO initiated the exploitation of several semi-precious mineral substances nationwide. His managerial approach increased significantly the mining production. Also, to prevent fraud of precious and semi-precious minerals, Kasongo's management implemented internal training of Congolese evaluators after having installed scanners at Congolese international airports, according to the Kimberley Process. The result in production and traceability was successful. (2006 to 2008).
- During its financial recovery, SOFIDE should be liquidated because of its bankruptcy. In its capacity as the major shareholder, the Central Bank of the Congo appointed Kasongo as the new CEO to give a strong signal for its rescue. Kasongo's management succeeded so to spare SOFIDE from its liquidation (1998-2000).
