= Enteromius lujae =

Conservation status
- Data Deficient (IUCN 3.1)

Scientific classification
- Domain: Eukaryota
- Kingdom: Animalia
- Phylum: Chordata
- Class: Actinopterygii
- Order: Cypriniformes
- Family: Cyprinidae
- Subfamily: Smiliogastrinae
- Genus: Enteromius
- Species: E. lujae

Binomial name
- Enteromius lujae (Boulenger, 1913)

Synonyms
- Barbus lujae Boulenger, 1913

Species of fish

Enteromius lujae is an African species of freshwater fish. It lives in the Sankuru River of D. R. Congo and Luce River, Kukulakaze, Cuanza River, Kunene River and Okavango River of Angola. It is hunted for human consumption and is threatened by artisanal and intensive diamond mining which causes sedimentation in small rivers of Kasai River.

== Footnotes ==
- Froese, Rainer; Pauly, Daniel (eds.). "Enteromius lujae". FishBase.
- Barbus lujae IUCN Red List (Accessed 2014)
