= Katanda Territory =

Katanda
- Territory
- Coordinates: 06°15′30″S 23°55′37″E
- Country: Democratic Republic of the Congo
- Province: Kasai-Oriental
- Founded: 1962
- Created: 18 January 1978 (age 48)
- Headquarters: Katanda Town
- Largest river: Lubilanji lulua Tshilemba

Government
  - AT: Jean
  - Parliamentary1: Kasongo Munganga
  - Parliamentary2: Mukuna Madimba

Area
  - Total: 1,856 km^{2} (717 sq mi)
- Elevation: 666 m (2,185 ft)

Population (2020)
  - Total: 709,359
  - Density: 382.2/km^{2} (989.9/sq mi)

Languages
  - Official: French
  - National: Tshiluba
- Time zone: UTC+02:00 (Congo eastern time)

Katanda Territory is one of five territories which, along with the city of Mbuji-Mayi, constitute the current Congolese province of Kasai-Oriental. The Democratic Republic of the Congo (DRC) is made up of 192 territories and 20 cities which are grouped in 26 provinces including Kinshasa, the capital city. Katanda Territory is sectioned into four sectors: Baluba-Lubilanji, Mutwayi, Nsangu, and Tshitolo. The territory is also endowed with three towns (Katanda, Tshala and Tshitenge). Katanda Town is the headquarters of both Katanda Territory and Baluba-Lubilanji Sector as well; this town is located on the top of the hill in the Bena Nshimba Grouping. Tshala town, in the Bakwa Ndaba Grouping, is also famous because of its power station on the Tshala River that supplies power to Mbuji-Mayi city and its neighborhoods. So, Tshitenge Town which is well known for its diamond businesses is in the Bena Nshimba Grouping.

== Meaning ==
Katanda simply means small hangar.

It once happened that somewhere on the hill, there was a single mother who used to sell her goods in her small hangar. With time, this small hangar became a meeting place for youth from everywhere and some travelers as well. So, when the Belgian settlers arrived to implant the Colo-Cotton (the colonial cotton industry), they asked autochthons for the name of that place and they all replied "Katanda", by reference to that single woman's small hangar. Katanda then became the name of the state post of settlers installed in 1924, comprising only a part of the Bena Nshimba Grouping which is located on the hill of the town of Katanda.

== Origin ==
The territory of Katanda originated from a colonial native constituency. During the pre-colonial period, this territory was ignored. On 1962, under the Provincial Governor Joseph Ngalula Mpanda-Njila, Katanda became a borough, which was made up of the actual territory of Katanda, including Bena Kalambayi Chiefdom and Bena Nomba Grouping. At that time, this borough was partitioned into rural communes. Katanda Territory was created on 1978, by Ordinance Law n 78/18 of 18 January 1978. Further, in 1982, Katanda Territory was divided into four sectors and one town (Katanda Town).

== Location ==
Katanda is located 60 km southwest of Mbuji-Mayi, the capital of East Kasai Province, in the Democratic Republic of the Congo. Katanda Territory is bounded to the north by Lusambo Territory (currently the town of the new province of Sankuru); to the northwest by Lupatapata Territory; to the south by Ngandajika Territory (Lomami); to the east by Kabinda Territory (Lomami); and to the west by both Tshilenge Territory and Mbuji Mayi city. Katanda lies approximately between 23 °42' 5" and 24 ° East longitudes, then 6° 17' 5" and 6 ° 25'3" South latitude.

== Administrative subdivisions ==
Katanda territory is subdivided into four sectors. The four sectors of the territory are subdivided into groupings as follows:

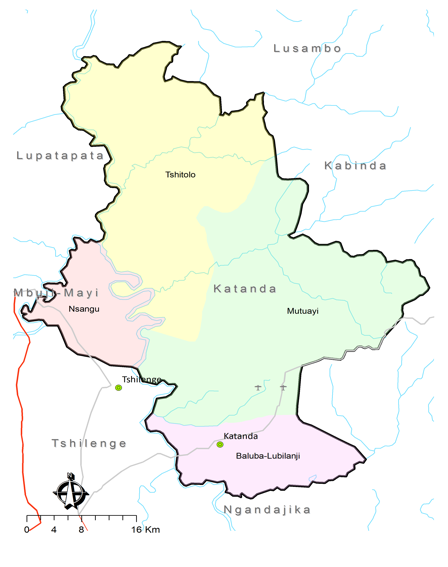
The 4 sectors that make up the territory of Katanda and its neighbors.

=== Sector of Baluba-Lubilanji ===
1. Bena Kapuya
2. Bena Muembia
3. Bena Nshimba (Most populous in the territory)

=== Sector of Mutwayi (Bibanga) ===
1. Bakwa Kanda Bakwa Mbuyi
2. Bakwa Kanda Bakwa Nyemba
3. Bakwa Lonji
4. Bakwa Tshinene (Lukangu)
5. Bena Nomba

=== Sector of Tshitolo ===
1. Bajambelu
2. Bakwa Ndaya
3. Bakwa Njiba
4. Bakwa Nseka
5. Bena Mbuyamba
6. Bena Nkelenda

=== Sector of Nsangu ===
1. Bakwa Bowa Grouping	2. Bakwa Ndaba Grouping	3. Bena Kabindi Grouping
Composed of 11 localities	Composed of 12 localities	Composed of 9 localities
1. Bakua Imba; 2. Bakua Ndaya; 3. Bena Kabua; 4. Bena Kasanga; 5. Bena Ngoyi Muana; 6. Bena Shabanza; 7. Bena Tshiantaku; 8. Bena Tshibindi; 9. Bena Tshikaya; 10. Mandu 1; 11. Mandu 2	1. Bakua Lubilanji; 2. Bakua Tshipamba; 3. Bena Kabunda; 4. Bena Musenga; 5. Bakua Nkamba; 6. Bena Tshimbayi; 7. Bakua Tshimuna; 8. Bena Ntonku; 9. Bena Mulamba; 10. Bakua Mulumba; 11. Bena Kalula; 12. Bena Kakona	1. Bakua Mukalenga; 2. Bakwa Lukesa; 3. Bena Shabanza; 4. Bakwa Mfika; 5. Bakua Kele; 6. Bena Mpiana; 7. Bena Mulunda; 8. Bakua Nkamba; 9. Lumpemba

Source: Mr. Modeste Tshimbowa Ntalaja, the current chief of Nsangu sector.

== Climate ==
Köppen-Geiger climate classification system classifies the climate of Katanda as tropical wet and dry (Aw). Two natural seasons alternate with the rainy season running from mid-August to mid-May, while the dry one runs from mid-May to mid-August. The rainfall is 1200 to 1400 mm. The temperature varies between 22 °C and 27 °C depending on the season, but sometimes it reaches 34 °C.

== Vegetation ==
The vegetation is dominated by imperata and panicum (the wooded savannah or clear forest). Its relief is rugged of valleys and hills.

== Ground ==
The soil of Katanda Territory is sandy and clayey. Its relief is rugged of the valleys and hills. The vegetation is dominated by imperata and panicum (the wooded savannah or clear forest). Its relief is rugged of valleys and hills.

== Hydrography ==
The territory is crossed by several rivers including lakes such Malengu, Lubombo, Nyinda, Kapongo, Kasampi and Lukelenge. But, the main and most important remains the river Lubilanji lulua Tshilemba, in short Lubilanji. This river crosses the territory to the west (through the sectors of Nsangu and Tshitolo) to the south (through the sector of Baluba-Lubilanji). Lubilanji River receives water from several streams such as Bufua, Kalenganyi, Kasulu, Mulunguyi River in the south in the sector of Baluba-Lubilanji; as well Kalenga, Mulamba and Mutuayi River in the east in the sector of Mutuayi.

== Predators ==
Formerly hidden in the depths of Lubilanji River, the crocodiles and hippopotamuses of Katandese rivers reappear, frequenting the banks, and terrorizing innocent people on their paths. Several people have been killed by ambuscades. Survivors keep testifying their tragedies and warning people to prevent any potential assault. Women refrain approaching the shores. The Province promised to assist the Territory by leading these carnivores back to their home rivers. Meanwhile, swimming is still prohibited and fishermen are converted to farmers.

Particularities and richness of the territory

Katanda is also one of those Congolese territories that holds a large part of the Congolese reserve of diamonds; the territory is mentioned among the largest producers of peanuts, palm oil, corn and cassava in the country.

== Economy ==
Katanda is a mining land inhabited by a traditionally mining population. So, despite the rarity of precious and semi-precious stones, the fall of raw materials on the international market, as well as other collateral repercussions of the financial crisis, diamond mining by individual contractors is still prevalent in the Katanda, whereas the economy is now oriented to subsistence activities such agriculture with local farmers who are using simple tools. The massive conversion of this mining people into farmers has significantly raised the provincial rank in the National agricultural production indicators. They could have done better but the infrastructure makes recurrent problems. The territorial activities is based on:

· Agriculture (45%)

· Retail trade (30%)

· Artisanal mining (diamond) (15%)

· Livestock (7%)

· Fishing (3%)

=== Cultural activities ===
The abundant harvest from these familial activities raises the economy of Katanda on the top list of the list of several national productions; such as corn & cassava. Some of these productions are consumed, some are stored for replanting (bartering is prohibited), and some other are sold.

The overproduction due to the increase in the quantity of workforce requires the improvement of some infrastructures such agricultural access roads arises.

=== Agriculture ===
Each household has at least one field where it practices agriculture. Subsistence farming is the type of agriculture intensively practiced in Katanda. This type is practiced to satisfying family or local needs alone, with a little left over for transport elsewhere. The territorial agricultural production started decreasing just when women and elderlies avoided maintaining and watering as scheduled their cornfields, fields of cassava, fields of wheat fearing hippopotamus and crocodiles' assaults offshore.

=== Hunting ===
Mostly men hunt while women either take care of children or their cattle.

==== Katanda Bone Harpoon Point ====
In 1988 Allison Brooks and John Yellin discovered a bone harpoon point in Katanda, Democratic Republic of Congo.

"Humans in Central Africa used some of the earliest barbed points, like this harpoon point, to spear huge prehistoric catfish weighing as much as 68 kg (150 lb)–enough to feed 80 people for two days. Later, humans used harpoons to hunt large, fast marine mammals" (http://humanorigins.si.edu/evidence/behavior/katanda-bone-harpoon-point, accessed 0510-2010)

== Culture ==
=== Language(s) ===
French is the official language, but the main spoken is Tshiluba

National language		Official language
1.Tshiluba	(80%)	· Only French
2. Swahili	(8%)	
3. Lingala	(2%)	

Being the unique official language of the country, French tends to take precedence over the four national languages as well as all dialects. However, only those who went to school are fluent in French, while the illiterates speak their specific broken French. Useful in professional fields, territorial branches, public administration, and somewhat in hospitals and police, French remains the principal working tool for students, teachers, authorities and so on in Katanda Territory.

Tshiluba remains the most spoken language throughout the territory of Katanda (spoken at 80%) because it is first and foremost the mother language in Katanda for natives, before also becoming one of the national languages. Since ancestries, autochthones spoke only Tshiluba Language. The influence of colonization and the effects of globalization have competitively lowered nowadays the predominance of Tshiluba Language to 80% speakers in various territorial fields.

The settlers brought French during the colonial period which is still useful for schooling. Catholic Church backed them up by introducing the alphabetization for adults and seniors in French.

In the '70s, Unitary system let Katanda people to get married with partners from different provinces; this allowed some household to speak other dialects according to their partner's understanding.

In the '80s, the wave of deportation from Katanga brought Swahili in all five territories of the East Kasai. Those deported once back home, they spread Swahili throughout the territory. So, with an estimated rate of 8% of Swahili-speakers, Swahili Language became the second national language most spoken at Katanda.

In the '90s, Democracy reinforced English in school which is still useful for teachers and students in school and various other circumstances. Even dominated by Tshiluba and somewhat Swahili, French remains the unique official language in Katanda and the entire country as well.

The Lingala which is so far spoken at 2% is positioned as the third national language of the territory. Both military and police are the first to introduce Lingala in this territory during various conflicts among groupings. After restoring the public order, military may further leave, whereas police will stay. Police were deployed throughout the entire territory for national purpose. They all speak only in Lingala with anyone on their way. Katanda people learned Lingala involuntarily just for to communicate with them. Secondly, the federal development agents working synergistically with the local authorities of public administration. They mostly came from the Capital Kinshasa where they speak fluently French & Lingala. Thirdly both, Tetela and Songe languages are audible on the Route National 2 as well as in some isolated conversations at the market. The constituency of Katanda is so far multilingual.

=== Cinema ===
Sax and Zadis (Kazadi), are the only modern movie theaters in the territory. They generally show popular recent Hollywood productions as well as NC-17 films. However, they also show movies about Congolese and African recent history like Mister Bob, Sniper: Reloaded, SEAL Team 8: Behind Enemy Lines, and Tears of the Sun. Before films, they both showed Congolese and international music videos, and US wrestling. Zadis primarily addresses the young adults of Lubumbashi. Children are exposed to huge NC-17 posters, but seldom get in.

Zadis in particular also screens great football matches, and local singers' concerts and Christian meetings are regularly held here. All over the city, especially in crowded neighborhoods, are spread small rooms in which children are exposed to violent movies from morning to night.

Nigeria's Nollywood films are also, as in many other parts of the DRC and Africa, popular among the residents. These films are often sold on VCD and DVD platforms.

=== Music ===
Folklore music dominates in the territory. The popular music from Kinshasa can also be heard around.

=== Okapi Radio's cultural participation ===
Okapi Radio's Katanda presenters participate each Saturday evening in "métissage," the cultural program of the radio. The whole country is informed of the cultural activities in the city.

== Media ==
=== National channel (RTNC/Katanga) ===
RTNC (Congolese National Radio and Television) has a provincial station located in Lubumbashi district at Mbuji-Mayi.

=== Independent channels ===
Radio Kasongo Munganga, the first independent radio station in the territory, started broadcasting in 2013; since then several radio stations were constructed.

== Sports ==
Katanda is home to football clubs such as TP Kasongo whose Chairman is the actual National Deputy of Katanda Territory, Professor Kasongo Munganga.

== Notable people ==
- Professor Kasongo Munganga (Chairman of TP Kasongo & Current National Deputy)
- Jonas Mukamba Kadiata Nzemba (Former CEO of Societé minière de Bakwanga MIBA)

== Sister city ==
- Liège, Belgium
