= Lubefu River =

River in Democratic Republic of the Congo

Coordinates: 4.165294°S 22.979965°E

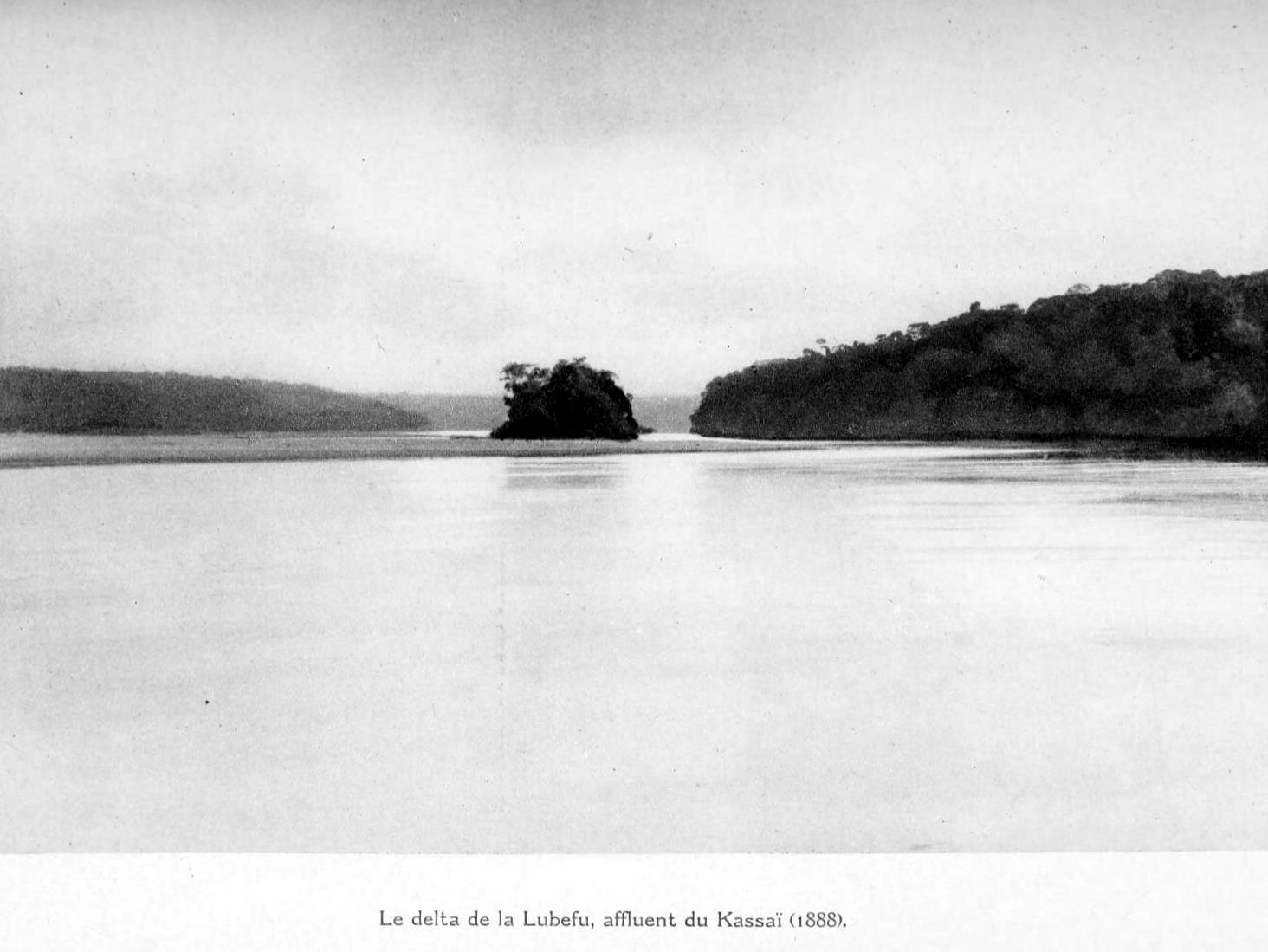
- Delta of the Lubefa River (1888)

Location
- Country: Democratic Republic of the Congo

Physical characteristics
- Mouth
  - location: Sankuru River

The Lubefu River is a tributary of the Sankuru River, which in turn is a tributary of the Kasai River in the Democratic Republic of the Congo.

One of the first Europeans to visit the river was Alexandre Delcommune in 1887 during an epic exploration of navigable rivers in the Congo Basin. An account of a journey through the Kasai River region in 1908 said there were crocodiles in the river but due to the rapid current there were no hippopotami except where the river joins the Sankuru. The river is fast, narrow and winding, and in places the overhanging trees form a tunnel. From Bena Dibele, a town on the Sankuru just below the point where it is joined by the Lubefu to the government station of Lubefu is about 100 miles (160 km). However, it took 19 days for a whaleboat with experienced paddlers to cover this distance.

The Belgian colonial authorities forced the peasants of the area to grow cotton against their will. Direct refusal to plant cotton would have been suicidal given the brutal techniques of the colonialists. One passive resistance technique was to boil the cotton seeds before planting them, so they would not germinate. In 1925 people living in the southern plains of the Lubefu explained to a state agronomist that "the soil is burning the cotton seeds".

== Sources ==
- Briart, Paul; Ryelandt, Dominique (2003). Aux sources du fleuve Congo: Carnets du Katanga, 1890-1893 (in French). Editions L'Harmattan. ISBN 2-7475-4861-9.
- Hilton-Simpson, M.W. (1911). Land and Peoples of the Kasai; Being a Narrative of a Two Years' Journey Among the Cannibals of the Equatorial Forest and Other Savage Tribes. Constable. p. 65.
- Likaka, Osumaka (1997). Rural society and cotton in colonial Zaire. University of Wisconsin Press. ISBN 0-299-15334-7.
