= Kasongo Musenga =

Congolese diplomat (born 1974)

His Excellency Kasongo Musenga Ambassador Extraordinary and Plenipotentiary
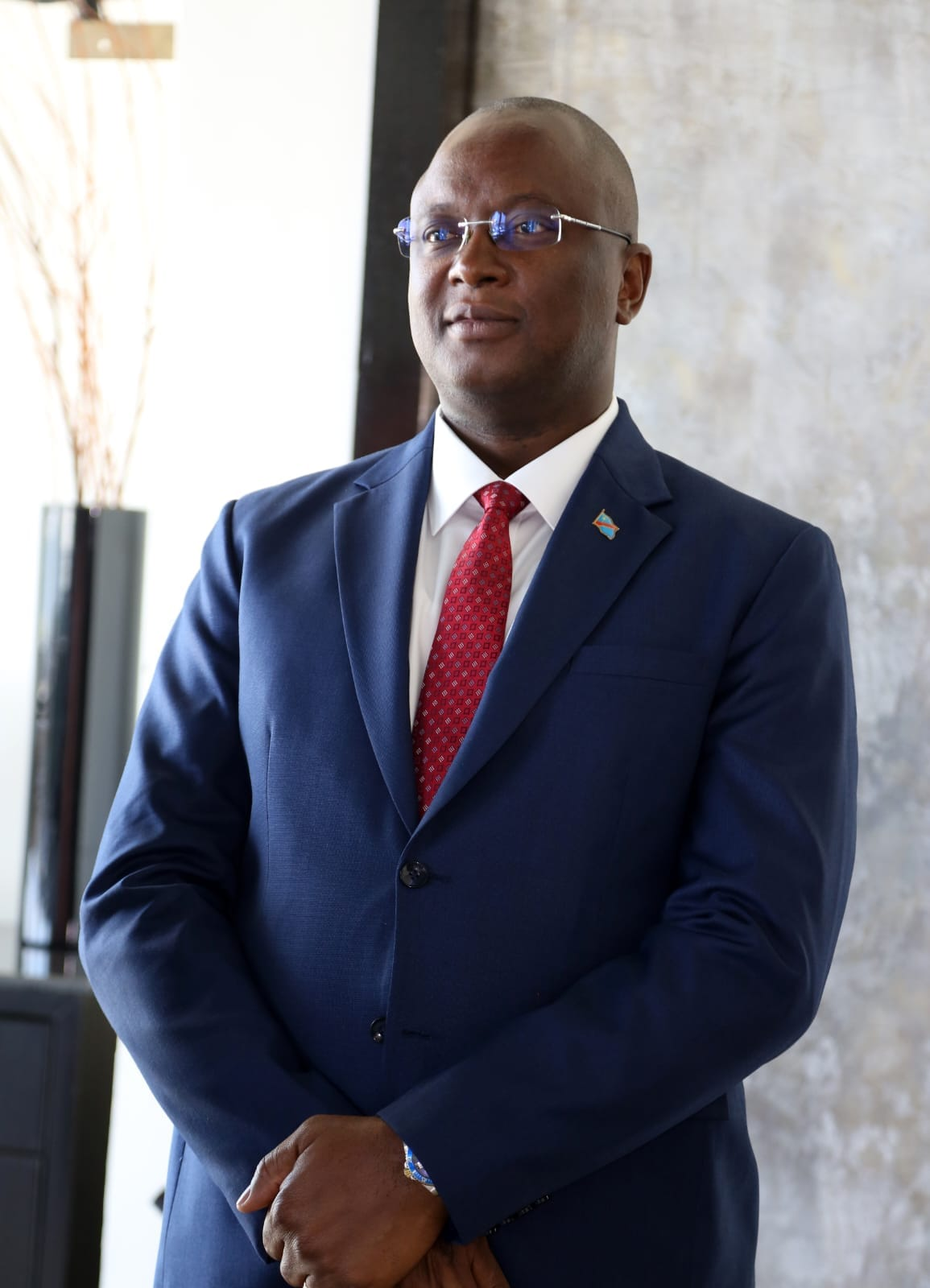

Congolese Ambassador Extraordinary and Plenipotentiary to Egypt
- Incumbent
- Assumed office December 19, 2022
- President: Felix Tshisekedi

Personal details
- Born: May 7, 1974 (age 52) Kinshasa, Democratic Republic of the Congo.
- Spouse: Nicole Ntumba (m. 2000)
- Children: 4

Born in Kinshasa on May 7, 1974 (age 52), Jean Baptiste Kasongo Musenga is a Congolese diplomat who is serving as Ambassador Extraordinary and Plenipotentiary of Congo to Egypt as of 2022. He presented his credentials to the Egyptian President Abdel Fattah el-Sisi on April 4, 2023. He joined the diplomatic service in 2000 and is a career member of the Senior Foreign Services, class of Extraordinary and Plenipotentiary Ambassador. Prior to his transfer to Egypt, he served as Minister Plenipotentiary at the Congolese Embassy in New Delhi, India (from February to December 2022)

== Personal life ==
Musenga's parents are committed Catholics although they are both from different ethnic groups: Professeur Kasongo Munganga (his father) is a Luba from Katanda Territory while his multilingual mother, Antoinette Mbwaki, is from Kisantu in Kongo Central. He married Nicole Ntumba in 2000, making him the father of four.

== Career ==
Musenga's diplomatic career began in May 2000 when he was posted to the embassy of the Democratic Republic of Congo in India where he served until his appointment as the Extraordinary and Plenipotentiary Ambassador of the Democratic Republic of Congo to the Arab Republic of Egypt in 2022.

=== Temporary at the Congolese Embassy in India 2000 - 2003 ===
Musenga's first posting was in 2000, when the Minister of Foreign Affairs of the Democratic Republic of the Congo) deployed him as a temp at AMBARDC New Delhi, India. Two years later, he was hired in the Public Service and assigned to the Foreign Affairs Ministry (Order Nº CAB.MIN/FP/MJ/kit/181/2002 of May 8, 2002 On Admission Sub-status and Appointment of Public Service Career Agents of the State of Different Ministries), hence the starting point of his diplomatic career.

=== Secretary at the Congolese Embassy in India 2003 - 2006 ===
He was transferred to AMBARDC New Delhi at the rank of 2nd Secretary of Embassy (aka ATB2), on January 29, 2003 (Transfer Order Nº 131.1/165/2003 of January 29, 2003 to exercise the functions of 2nd Embassy Secretary). He joined the Corps of Diplomats of the Republic at the rank of 1st Secretary of Embassy (aka ATB1) on May 10, 2003 (Order Nº 130/006 of May 10, 2003 of the Minister of Foreign Affairs and International Cooperation, page 3, relating to integration into the diplomatic corps of the Republic)

=== Counselor at the Congolese Embassy in India 2006 - 2022 ===
- Musenga was promoted to the rank of 2nd Embassy Counselor (aka Chef de Bureau), on September 27, 2006 and transferred to AMBARDC New Delhi (Transfer and Regularization Order Nº130A.E/131.1/1197/2005 of September 27, 2006 to exercise the functions of 2nd Counselor of Embassy)
- Twelve years later, he get promoted to the rank of First Advisor (aka Chef de Division), by Order Nº 130/0006/2018 of January 23, 2018 supplementing and modifying Collective Commissioning Nº 130/0001/2017 of December 22, 2017 for Agents and Officials of the Ministry of Foreign Affairs and Regional Integration

=== Minister Counselor 2022 ===
On May 5, 2022, Kasongo was promoted as Minister Counselor (by Order Nº 038/CAB.VPMIN/FP-MA-ISP/JPL/2022 of the interim appointment of career staff to public command posts State services of the various Ministries). He thus became a career member of the Senior Foreign Services.

=== Ambassador to Egypt ===
On December 19, 2022, President Félix Tshisekedi appointed Kasongo Musenga as the Extraordinary and Plenipotentiary Ambassador of the Democratic Republic of Congo to the Arab Republic of Egypt (Ordinance Nº 22/247 of December 19, 202). He was officially sworn in as Ambassador to Egypt on December 29, 2022. He arrived in Cairo on January 26, 2023 and presented his credentials to President Abdel Fattah el-Sisi on February 23, 2023. In October 2025, Musenga accompanied President Félix Tshisekedi during an official visit to Cairo for the inauguration of the Grand Egyptian Museum and high-level bilateral talks with President Abdel Fattah el-Sisi.

== Accomplishments ==
Alerted by the cry of distress of Congolese players stranded in Sudan following the war, the Minister of Sports and Leisure, Mr. Kabulo informed President Félix Tshisekedi. The latter entrusted this emergency mission to his extraordinary and plenipotentiary ambassador in Egypt, Kasongo Musenga who brought back all the players safe and sound. It is Fabrice Ngoma, Steven Ebwela, Glody Lilepo and trainer Eugène Bulayima who are finally in Kinshasa, accompanied by the ambassador Jean Baptiste Kasongo Musenga. They were welcomed at N'djili Airport, in the early afternoon of Monday, May 15, 2023, by the Minister of Sports and Leisure François Kabulo Mwana Kabulo.

== See also ==
- "President Al-Sisi receives credentials of new ambassadors to Egypt" on YouTube
- (L – R) Mr. Surender Singh; H.E Mr. Francois Balumuene, Ambassador of DR Congo to India; Mr. Kasongo Musenga, Second Counsellor of Democratic Republic of Congo; Mr. Sumit and Mr. Sikander posing for a photograph
- DR Congo seeks to boost cooperation with Egypt in pharmaceutical sector – Medafrica Times

Diplomatic posts
Preceded by Mrs Nduku Booo	Ambassador Extraordinary and Plenipotentiary to Egypt; 2022–Present	Incumbent
Preceded by Mavinga	Minister plenipotentiary to India; 2018–2022	Succeeded by Freddy Damier
