= List of governors of Kasaï Oriental Province =

Kasaï Oriental in the Democratic Republic of the Congo

Kasaï Oriental since 2015

This list of governors of Kasaï Oriental Province includes governors of the former Kasaï-Oriental Province of the Democratic Republic of the Congo, created in 1966 by merging Lomami, Sankuru and Sud-Kasaï provinces, which had been split from the former Kasaï province. It also contains lists of governors of the three predecessor provinces.

Kasaï Oriental was split in 2015 into the new, smaller Kasaï-Oriental, Lomami and Sankuru provinces.

== Predecessor provinces (1962–1966) ==
The governors (or equivalent) of the provinces that were combined to form Kasaï Oriental Province were:

=== Lomami ===
Start	End	Officeholder	Title
15 September 1962	April 1966	Dominique Manono	President, from 1965, governor
18 Apr 1966	25 April 1966	Jean Marie Kikalanga	Governor

=== Sankuru ===
Start	End	Officeholder	Title
14 September 1962	December 1963	André Diumasumbu	President
1 January 1963	April 1963	Athanase Ndjadi	President (in rebellion)
27 December 1963	June 1965	Paul Marcel Sumbu	President
1 June 1965	27 January 1966	Benoît Wetshindjadi	Governor
18 April 1966	25 April 1966	Étienne Kihuyu	Governor

=== Sud-Kasaï ===
Start	End	Officeholder	Title
9 August 1960	12 April 1961	Albert Kalonji (1929–2015)	President
12 April 1961	14 July 1961	Albert I Kalonji	King
August 1962	October 1962	Sébastien Ikolo	Special commissioner
12 October 1962	July 1965	Joseph Ngalula (b. 1928)	President
August 1965	25 April 1966	Jonas Mukamba (b. 1931)	Governor

== Governors of Kasaï Oriental ==
The governors of Kasaï Oriental were:

Start	End	Officeholder	Title
25 April 1966	3 January 1967	Jonas Mukamba	Governor
3 January 1967	9 August 1968	Henri-Désiré Takizala (1936–2000)	Governor
9 August 1968	23 December 1970	Bernard Ndebo	Governor
23 December 1970	9 Jul 1971	André William Ntikala	Governor
9 Jul 1971	24 February 1972	Derikoye Tite Avungara	Governor
24 February 1972	15 Jul 1972	Boji Ntole	Governor
15 Jul 1972	19 March 1974	Mozagba Ngbuka	Commissioner
19 March 1974	10 February 1976	Matabisi Iyualeke Ilande	Commissioner
10 February 1976	21 January 1978	Kyalwe Mihambo	Commissioner
21 January 1978	18 January 1980	Kamakanda N'koma	Commissioner
18 January 1980	10 October 1981	Efambe Ey'Olanga	Governor
10 October 1981	19 March 1983	Zamundu Agenong'Ka	Governor
19 March 1983	1 January 1985	Duga Kugbe Toro (d. 2010)	Governor
1 January 1985	10 March 1985	Konde Vila Kikanda	Governor
10 March 1985	26 April 1986	Mananga Dintoko Pholo	Governor
26 April 1986	1987	Mpambia Musanga Bekaja (b. 1935)	Governor
		Bangala Basila (b. 1943)	Governor
		Bashala Kantu wa Milandu	Governor
1989	1992	Elias Kakule Mbahingana (1947–2011)	Governor
		Dikonda wa Lumanyisha	Governor
April 1997	November 1997	Mbuyi Mulomba	Governor
27 November 1997	January 1999	Omer Kamba	Governor
		Mbala Muana	Governor
15 March 1999	1999	Jean-Charles Okoto (b. 1955)	Governor
	March 2001	Paul Kabongo	Governor
March 2001	26 November 2001		
26 November 2001	26 May 2004	Jean-Marie Mbala	Governor
26 May 2004	16 March 2007	Dominique Kanku (b. 1963)	Governor
16 March 2007	29 October 2015	Alphonse Ngoyi Kasanji (b. 1963)	Governor
29 October 2015	8 May 2019	Alphonse Ngoyi Kasanji	Special commissioner, then governor from April 2016
8 May 2019		Jean Maweja Muteba (b. 1958)	Governor

== See also ==
- List of governors of Kasaï (former province)
- Lists of provincial governors of the Democratic Republic of the Congo
