= Tshilenge =

- Location in DRC
- Coordinates: 6°15′S 23°46′E
- Country: DRC
- province: Kasai-Oriental Province

Population (2012)
  - Total: 84,651
- Time zone: UTC+2 (Central Africa Time)
- Climate: Cwb

Tshilenge is a city in Kasai-Oriental Province, in eastern Democratic Republic of the Congo. It is the capital of Tshilenge Territory.
