= Tshilenge Territory =

Tshilenge
- Territory
- Interactive map of Tshilenge
- Coordinates: 6.2500°S 23.7670°E
- Country: DR Congo
- Province: Kasaï-Oriental

Area
  - Total: 2,021 km^{2} (780 sq mi)

Population (2020)
  - Total: 912,353
  - Density: 451.4/km^{2} (1,169/sq mi)
- Time zone: UTC+2 (CAT)

Tshilenge is a territory in Kasai-Oriental province of the Democratic Republic of the Congo. Its capital is Tshilenge.

== Geography ==
The territory of Tsilenge is bordered by:

- To the north by the Lubilanji River, which separates it from the territory of Katanda;

- To the south by the Kalelu River, which separates it from the territory of Luilu (Lomami Province);

- To the east by the same river, which separates it from the territory of Ngadajika;

- To the west by the Mbujimayi River, which separates it from the town of Mbujimayi, and also forms a border with the territories of Miyabi, Kamiji and Lupatapata.

== Municipalities ==
The territory includes two rural municipalities with a population of less than 80,000 voters:

- Lukalaba (7 municipal councilors)
- Tshilenge (7 municipal councilors)

== Chiefdom ==
It includes one chiefdom, the Bakwa-Kalonji Chiefdom, which comprises 29 groups.
