= Mbuji-Mayi =

- Provincial capital and city
- Ville de Mbuji-Mayi
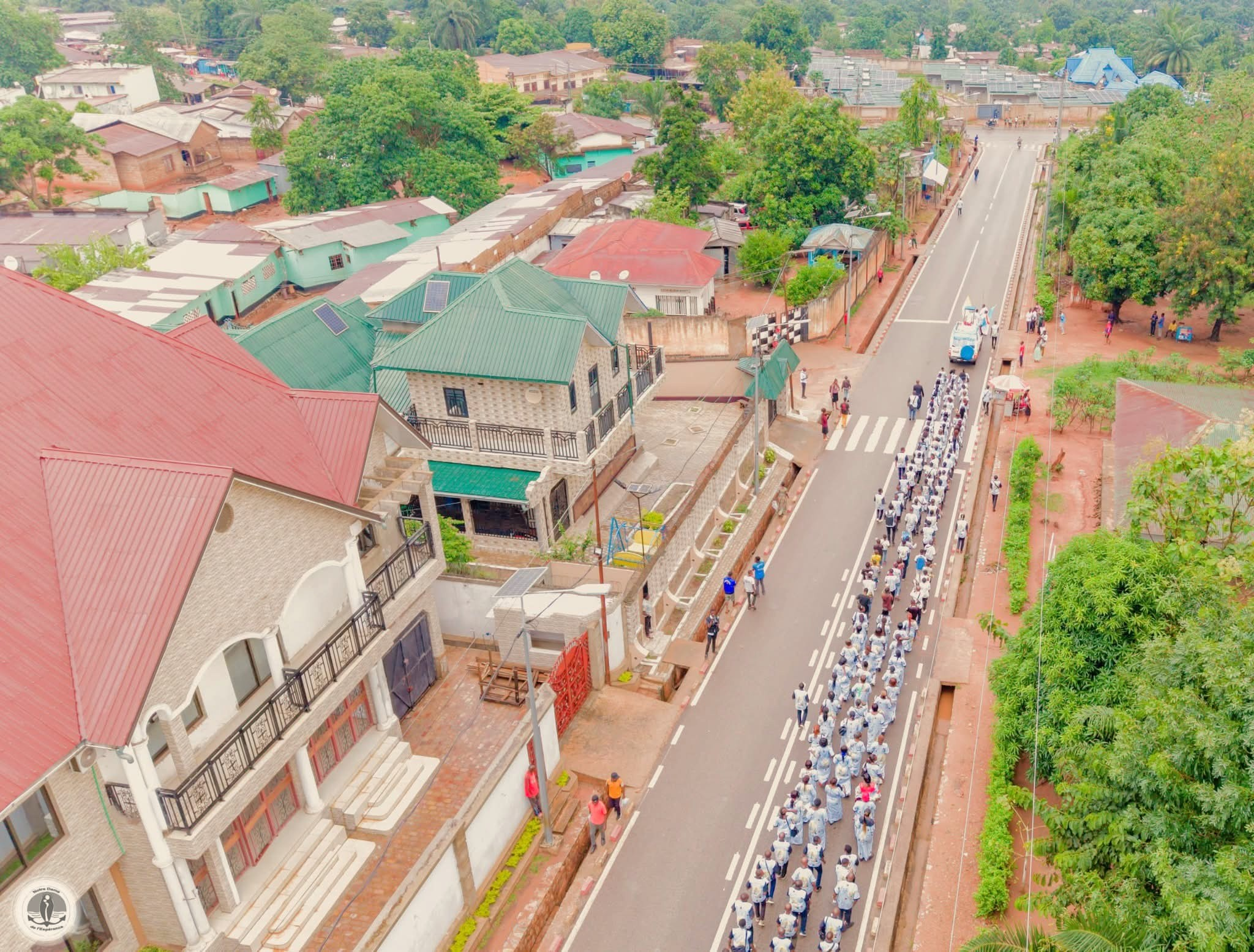
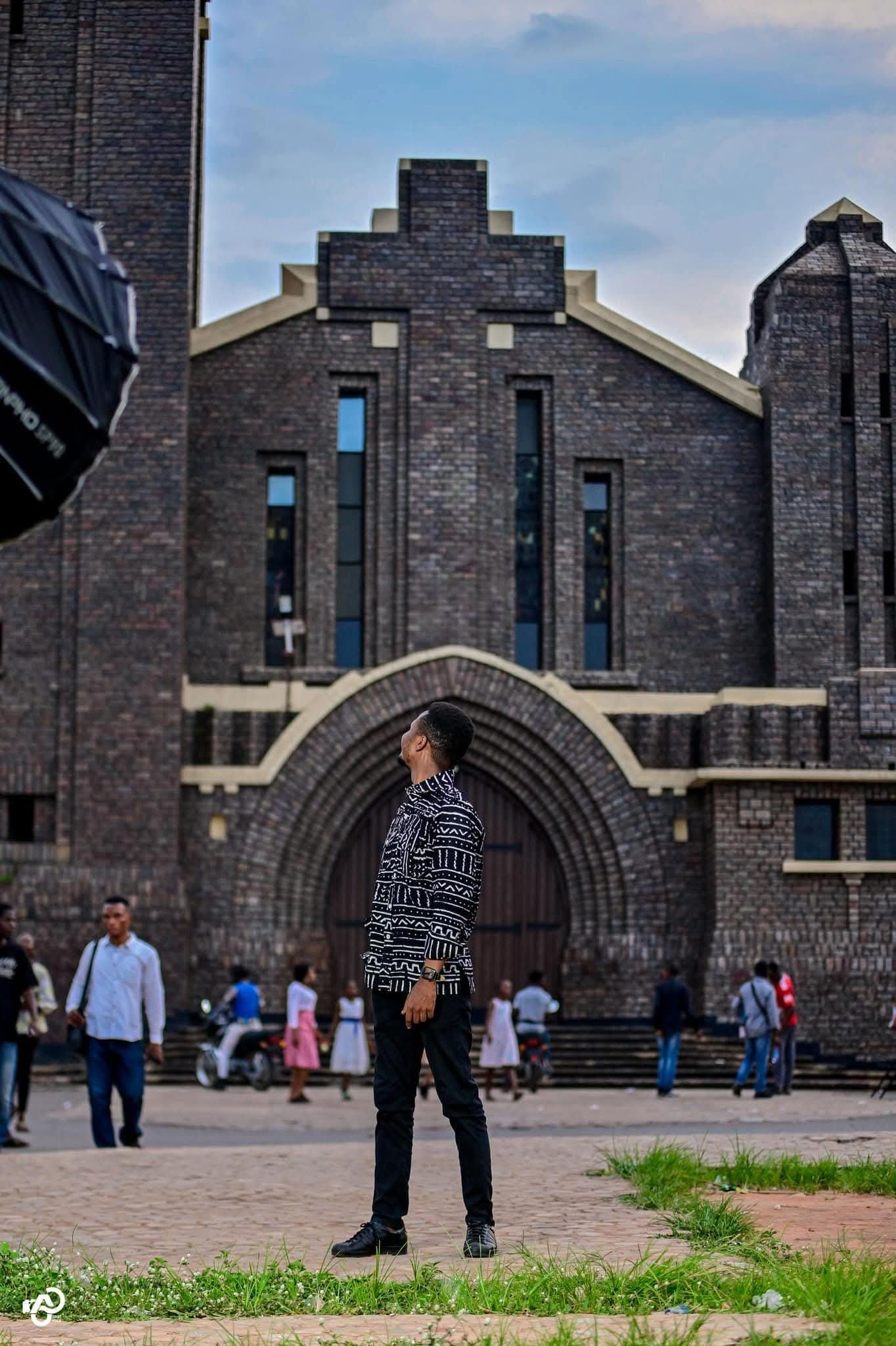
- Street view of Mbuji-Mayi Cathédrale Saint-Jean-Baptiste de Bonzola

- Location within Democratic Republic of the Congo
- Coordinates: 6°07′34″S 23°35′59″E
- Country: Democratic Republic of the Congo
- Province: Kasai-Oriental
- Founded: 1914

Government
  - Mayor: Jean-Marie Lutumba

Area
  - Urban: 135.12 km^{2} (52.17 sq mi)
- Elevation: 549 m (1,801 ft)

Population (2023)
  - Urban: 2,892,000
  - Urban density: 21,400/km^{2} (55,430/sq mi)
  - Ethnicities: Majority Luba-Kasaï (Baluba) • other Bantu peoples
- Time zone: UTC+2 (Central Africa Time)
- Climate: Aw

Mbuji-Mayi (known until end-1962 as Bakwanga) is a city and the capital of Kasai-Oriental Province in the south-central Democratic Republic of Congo. It is thought to be the second largest city in the country, after the capital Kinshasa and ahead of Lubumbashi, Kisangani and Kananga, though its exact population is not known. Estimates range from a 2010 CIA World Factbook estimated population of 1,480,000 to as many as 3,500,000 estimated by the United Nations in 2008.

Mbuji-Mayi lies in Luba country on the Mbuji-Mayi River. The name Mbuji-Mayi comes from the local language, Tshiluba, and translates as "Goat-Water," a name deriving from the great number of goats in the region. Despite its large population, the city remains remote, having little connection to surrounding provinces or to Kinshasa and Lubumbashi. However, Mbuji-Mayi is the traditional centre of industrial diamond mining in Congo, being located on top of one of the largest known deposits in the world. Air travel is provided through the Mbuji Mayi Airport.

== Territorial organization ==
Mbuji-Mayi is made up of five communes (municipalities), each headed by a burgomaster: Bipemba, Dibindi, Diulu, Kanshi and Muya. This division into communes has been in effect since Ministerial (Departmental) Order No. 83 of 4 March 1968 of the Minister of the Interior.

== History ==
=== Pre-independence ===
The region where the city of Mbuji-Mayi now stands was once a cluster of villages on land owned by the Bakwanga clan. Diamonds were first discovered in the area as early as 1907, but the true value of the find was not recognised until 1913. Following the discovery, a mining camp designed to house miners and company officials of the Societé minière de Bakwanga (MIBA) was developed in the area.

The young city, known at the time as Bakwanga, grew quickly but around strict planning by MIBA, which divided the community into labor camps, mining areas and living quarters. The city's growth was not explosive, and planning was done with the needs of the mining company in mind, not the development of the region as a general population centre.

In fact, fearing theft of the company's diamond resources, the MIBA actively discouraged building in the region and closely monitored who went in and out of the region. Every person in the region needed a permit allowing them to be there, and registration at a command post that monitored the population, which made indefinite residence in the area almost impossible to establish. There was limited economic activity besides the company-run mining, with even limited agriculture, and the city's population remained low, at approximately 39,830 by the late 1950s.

As the city grew, more and more infrastructure needs required investment in roads, public works and hospitals. While several primary schools were developed for workers, until independence, there was no higher education available for the native population.

=== Mineral wealth ===
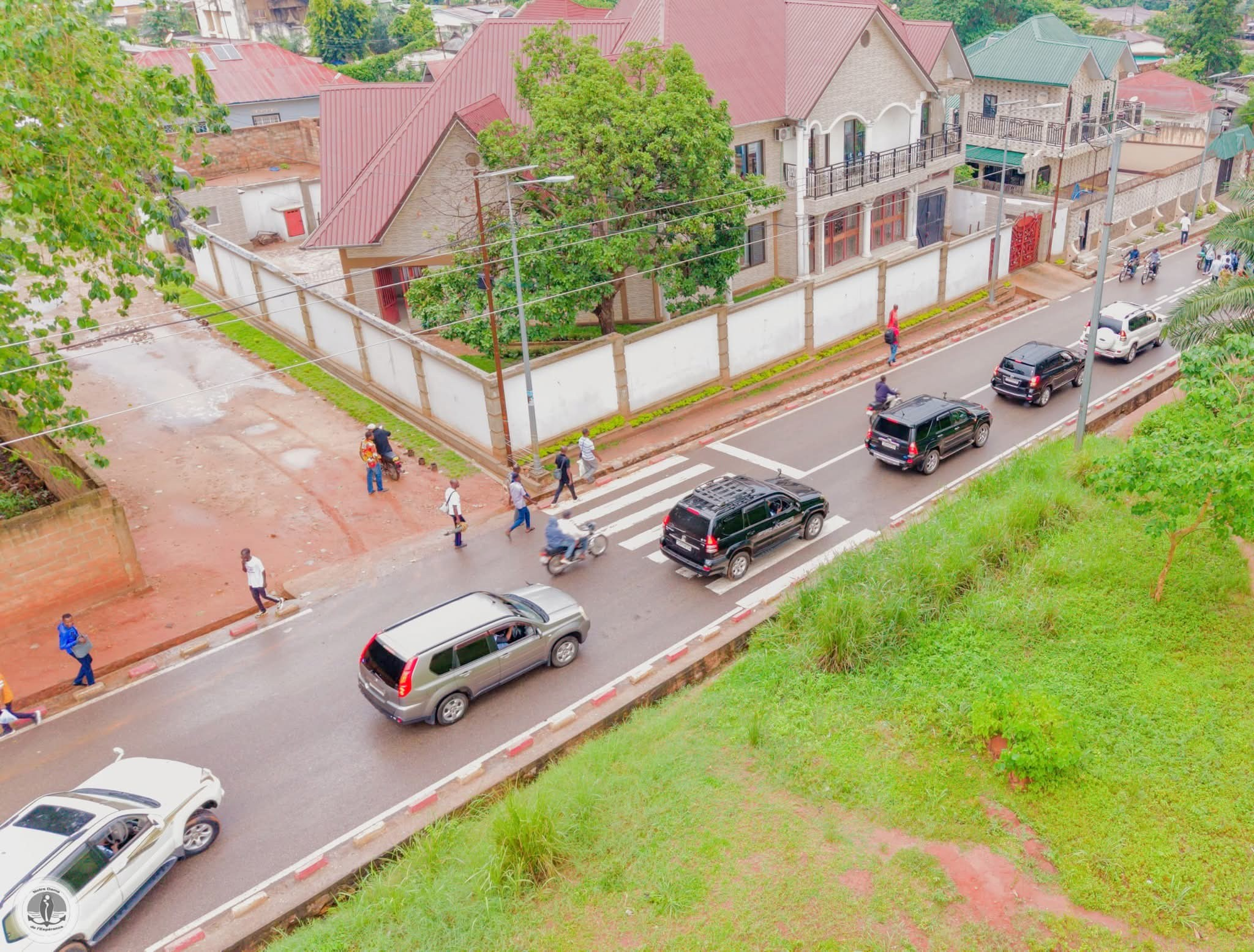
A street scene in Mbuji-Mayi, with pedestrians and vehicles moving through a residential area.

The area around Mbuji-Mayi is one of the richest sources of mineral wealth in the world. In the 1950s, it was estimated that the Mbuji-Mayi area had the world's most important industrial diamond deposits, containing at least 300 million karats of diamonds. The city was constructed on top of the diamond deposits, and while the city's reputation as a company town under tight control of Belgian economic interests led the Belgians to invest in self-serving infrastructure, it also meant that the city's buildings and homes, including those of top MIBA executives, were sometimes demolished to access the diamonds.

In the earlier years, most of the diamonds mined in the area came from one large MIBA-controlled mine on the city's outskirts, but diamonds could also be easily found in the area's streams and waterways, making it possible for anyone to collect them.

As of 1963, Mbuji-Mayi-based MIBA was the source of 80 percent of the world's industrial diamonds and 57 percent of all diamonds.

=== Capital city of South Kasai ===
Mbuji-Mayi grew rapidly upon Congolese independence in 1960 with the immigration of members of the Luba ethnic group from different parts of the country.

Shortly after independence, Albert Kalonji, a Luba tribal chief, declared himself ruler of the secessionist Mining State of South Kasai on 8 August 1960 and established the city, then still known as Bakwanga, as his capital. In April 1961, Kalonji declared himself as emperor of the region in a traditional tribal ceremony and then returned to Bakwanga, where he was "carried through crowds of chanting, singing and cheering Balubas," and dancing continued outside his royal palace there for four days.

The celebration was short-lived, as the central government's Armée Nationale Congolaise (ANC) troops took control of the town and arrested Kalonji, by December 1961. After escaping from the jail in which he was being held, he briefly re-established his government. A second assault on the independent state was launched in the summer of 1962, with ANC government troops fighting poorly armed tribesmen outside of the city. Kalonji was captured again on 4 October 1962 when ANC forces retook Bakwanga, effectively ending the region's independence. Soon after the end of the secession, on 1 January 1961 Bakwanga was renamed Mbuji-Mayi after the local river, in an attempt to signify a Luba intra-ethnicity reconciliation since the name Bakwanga referred to only one subgroup.

=== Jonas Nzemba ===
Throughout the 1980s and 1990s, Zaïre and Mobutu paid little attention to Mbuji-Mayi, offering almost no money to build roads, schools or hospitals.

In the political vacuum, MIBA stepped in. In the place of the federal government, MIBA invested heavily in the region by repairing roads, paying soldiers and supplying water and electricity to the city from its own power station. The company set up a social fund of $5 to $6 million a year, roughly 8 percent of its annual budget. This money went to repair infrastructure and to fund a new university.

The investments and its position as largest employer made Jonas Mukamba Kadiata Nzemba the chief executive officer of MIBA one of the most powerful men in the region, and the de facto governor of Mbuji-Mayi. Nzemba, who was appointed by Mobutu in 1986, was considered one of the more powerful players in Mobutu's political party, the Popular Movement of the Revolution (MPR), but he also called himself a "brother" of Étienne Tshisekedi, a popular local political figure and Mobutu's most significant political opposition.

Nzemba is credited with creating the Conference pour le Developpement Economique de Kasai Oriental (CDEKO), a regional economic development group in the early 1990s. Nzemba also backed the creation of the University of Kasai, which was jointly sponsored by MIBA and the local Catholic Church, and which became the home base of CDEKO. The new organization spearheaded economic growth in Mbuji-Mayi, helped support the development of new agricultural and beer industry expansion around the city and launched Wetrafa, a locally owned airline.

Mobutu's willingness to let Nzemba control the province through MIBA came at a price, as Nzemba may have skimmed as much as $1.5 to $2 million a month to send to Mobutu's personal bank accounts.

Although Nzemba and MIBA's largesse helped Mbuji-Mayi maintain some semblance of infrastructure and social services, at least by the standards of Zaïre, the city still struggled. Electricity was spotty, the university was broken down and the road system disintegrated with the rain. Outside of the sector of the city controlled by MIBA, the road network was virtually nonexistent, and in 1991, the entire city had only about 19.7 km of paved roads, all in poor condition. The state-run power plant went out of service in 1990, with an 11.8 mW hydroelectric plant run by MIBA as the only source of electricity, but frequent power outages led residents to other sources of heat and light, mainly wood and charcoal leading to widespread deforestation in the area.

=== Civil war ===
As the First Congo War broke out, Nzemba initially sided with Mobutu against the rebels led by Laurent-Désiré Kabila, but as Kabila's Alliance of Democratic Forces for the Liberation of Congo-Zaire (AFDL or ADFLC) approached the city, Nzemba quickly switched sides.

When the city fell to the rebels on 4 April 1997, looting by both sides took a toll on the city, particularly MIBA's mining operations. Nzemba was also summoned to Goma to speak with Kabila, who held him for several days, prompting his family to purchase advertising in newspapers publicising their concerns for his safety. Nzemba was released shortly after, but MIBA began making "voluntary contributions" to Kabila's war, an estimated $5.5 million in 1997 and 1998.

In October 1998, Mbuji-Mayi was occupied by both Zimbabwean and Chadian troops as they poured into the country to back up Kabila as the First Congo War began to grow.

=== Early 21st century ===
As of 2019 some residents were obtaining water from local rivers which contributed to local outbreaks of water-borne diseases such as cholera. In 2020 the DRC government launched a project to improve drinking water expected to cost at least $26.2 million. This investment was expected to help, but not be enough to substantially solve the city's water crisis. The Pan China company doing the work will rehabilitate the city's pumping station, extend the distribution network, construct water towers, and add metering and administrative buildings.

== Culture and economy ==
=== Diamond mining and smuggling ===
As a commercial center, Mbuji-Mayi handles most diamond mining, panning, and production in the Democratic Republic of the Congo. Societé minière de Bakwanga and Diamant International are the major diamond producers in the area.

The city had always been a major source of the world's diamonds and that did not change after independence, nor did the age-old tradition of diamond smuggling. But after independence, that ability of the government to control the diamond smuggling quickly eroded and diamond smuggling dramatically increased. The black market quickly eclipsed the official business, and in 1963, MIBA officially recorded producing 1.4 million karats of diamonds, while smugglers exported between 4 million and 6 million more karats.

=== Architecture ===
The city lacks much of the organization and classic European architecture that other major cities in the DRC inherited from the Belgian colonists. Journalist Michela Wrong, described Mbuji-Mayi as "a curiously soulless settlement, with no tangible centre ... It is purely functional conurbation, dedicated to making money, with little left over for less focused activities." Even today, much of the city revolves around the Avenue Inga, where diamond and mineral buyers have set up shop and the city's main business remains the diamond trade.

=== Human rights criticisms ===
In January 2015 there was an outbreak of tuberculosis (TB), including multi-drug-resistant TB in the Mbuji-Mayi Central Prison. The CDC investigated and found the prison was filled to six times its capacity giving each prisoner a fixed spot less than about 0.25 square meters (2.7 square feet) in a cell. About half of the inmates were malnourished. These conditions, combined with poor ventilation, lack of sunshine, and lack of TB screening, had allowed TB to spread for years.

Amnesty International published a report in 2002 about dozens of people being shot dead in the diamond fields of Mbuji-Mayi, with most victims suspected of illegal mining. No state agents were known to have been prosecuted for the killings. Poverty lures in illegal miners to MIBA diamond concessions where they may be shot or detained in quarters with poor living conditions.

== Climate ==
Köppen-Geiger climate classification system classifies its climate as tropical wet and dry (Aw).

Climate data for Mbuji-Mayi (1991–2021)
| Month | Jan | Feb | Mar | Apr | May | Jun | Jul | Aug | Sep | Oct | Nov | Dec | Year |
|---|---|---|---|---|---|---|---|---|---|---|---|---|---|
| Mean daily maximum °C (°F) | 29.8 (85.6) | 30.7 (87.3) | 30.5 (86.9) | 30.5 (86.9) | 31.8 (89.2) | 32.9 (91.2) | 33.6 (92.5) | 32.9 (91.2) | 30.9 (87.6) | 29.8 (85.6) | 29.4 (84.9) | 29.2 (84.6) | 31.0 (87.8) |
| Daily mean °C (°F) | 24.6 (76.3) | 25.1 (77.2) | 25.0 (77.0) | 25.0 (77.0) | 25.7 (78.3) | 25.6 (78.1) | 26.2 (79.2) | 26.3 (79.3) | 25.1 (77.2) | 24.5 (76.1) | 24.2 (75.6) | 24.2 (75.6) | 25.1 (77.2) |
| Mean daily minimum °C (°F) | 20.8 (69.4) | 21.1 (70.0) | 21.1 (70.0) | 21.1 (70.0) | 20.7 (69.3) | 19.0 (66.2) | 19.0 (66.2) | 20.5 (68.9) | 20.8 (69.4) | 20.7 (69.3) | 20.6 (69.1) | 20.7 (69.3) | 20.5 (68.9) |
| Average precipitation mm (inches) | 149 (5.9) | 137 (5.4) | 186 (7.3) | 148 (5.8) | 40 (1.6) | 7 (0.3) | 3 (0.1) | 33 (1.3) | 119 (4.7) | 170 (6.7) | 191 (7.5) | 179 (7.0) | 1,362 (53.6) |
| Average precipitation days | 16 | 14 | 17 | 15 | 5 | 1 | 0 | 5 | 13 | 18 | 19 | 18 | 141 |
| Average relative humidity (%) | 81 | 80 | 81 | 81 | 69 | 50 | 41 | 55 | 75 | 82 | 83 | 83 | 72 |
| Mean daily sunshine hours | 8.3 | 8.5 | 8.0 | 8.0 | 9.2 | 10.1 | 10.3 | 9.4 | 7.5 | 6.8 | 6.9 | 7.6 | 8.4 |
Source: Climate-Data.org, altitude: 614m

== Education ==
- University of Mbuji Mayi
- Université Officielle de Mbuji Mayi
- Université de Tshilenge

== See also ==
- Roman Catholic Diocese of Mbujimayi
