= Katanda, Russia =

Katanda Катанда
- Village
- Location within Altai Republic Location within Russia
- Coordinates: 50°09′N 86°10′E
- Country: Russia
- Region: Altai Republic
- District: Ust-Koksinsky District
- Time zone: UTC+7:00

Katanda (Russian: Катанда. Altay: Катан Туу, romanized: Qatan Tû) is a rural locality (a selo) and the administrative centre of Katandinskoye Rural Settlement of Ust-Koksinsky District, the Altai Republic, Russia. The population was 905 as of 2016. There are 16 streets.

== Geography ==
Katanda is located in the Katanda steppe, 50 km southeast of Ust-Koksa (the district's administrative centre) by road. Tyungur is the nearest rural locality.
