= South Kasai =

1960–1962 unrecognised state in Africa

Coordinates: 6°7′30″S 23°36′0″E

South Kasai Sud-Kasaï
- 1960–1962
- Flag Coat of arms
- Anthem: Debout Congolais (French); Arise, Congolese
- Map of the Congo in 1961 with South Kasai highlighted in red, bordered by secessionist Katanga to the south.
- Status: Unrecognised state
- Capital: Bakwanga
- Government: De Jure: Autonomous federated state of the Republic of the Congo; De facto: Independent semi-presidential, later monarchic, ethnocracy
- President/Emperor
  - 1960–1962: Albert Kalonji
- Historical era: Congo Crisis
  - Congolese independence: 30 June 1960
  - Unilateral secession: 9 August 1960
  - Monarchy proclaimed: 12 April 1961
  - Arrest of Kalonji: 30 December 1961
  - Coup d'état: 29 September 1962
  - Dissolution: 5 October 1962

Population
  - 1962 est.;: 2,000,000
- Currency: Congolese franc
| Preceded by | Succeeded by |
| Republic of the Congo (Léopoldville) | Republic of the Congo (Léopoldville) |
- Today part of: Democratic Republic of the Congo

South Kasai (French: Sud-Kasaï) was an unrecognised secessionist state within the Republic of the Congo (the modern-day Democratic Republic of the Congo) (Note: Not to be confused with the neighbouring state currently known as the Republic of the Congo, formerly the French Congo, with its capital at Brazzaville. The state's name changed to the Democratic Republic of the Congo in August 1964.) which was semi-independent between 1960 and 1962. Initially proposed as only a province, South Kasai sought full autonomy in similar circumstances to the much larger neighbouring state of Katanga, to its south, during the political turmoil arising from the independence of the Belgian Congo known as the Congo Crisis. Unlike Katanga, however, South Kasai did not explicitly declare full independence from the Republic of the Congo or reject Congolese sovereignty.

The South Kasaian leader and main advocate, Albert Kalonji, who had represented a faction of the nationalist movement (the Mouvement National Congolais-Kalonji or MNC-K) before decolonisation, exploited ethnic tensions between his own ethnic group, the Baluba, (Note: In most Bantu languages, the prefix ba- is added to a human noun to form a plural. As such, Baluba refers collectively to members of the Luba ethnic group. Its adjectival form is Muluba.) and the Bena Lulua to create a Luba-focused state in the group's traditional heartland in the south-eastern parts of the Kasai region. As sectarian violence broke out across the country, the state declared its secession from the Congo on 9 August 1960 (Note: Some sources instead date the state's proclamation to 8 August.) and its government and called for the Baluba living in the rest of the Congo to return to their "homeland". Kalonji was appointed president. Although the South Kasaian government claimed to form an autonomous part of a federal Congo-wide state, it exercised a degree of regional autonomy and even produced its own constitution and postage stamps. The state, supported by foreign powers, particularly Belgium, and funded by diamond exports, managed numerous crises, including those caused by the large emigration of Luba refugees, but became increasingly militarist and repressive.

Soon after its secession, South Kasaian and Congolese troops clashed after the Congolese central government ordered an offensive against it. The resulting campaign, planned to be the first act of a larger action against Katanga, was accompanied by widespread massacres of Baluba and a refugee crisis termed a genocide by some contemporaries. The state was rapidly overrun by Congolese troops. The violence in the suppression of Kasai provided much legitimacy to Joseph Kasa-Vubu's deposition of Patrice Lumumba from the office of prime minister in late 1960 and Lumumba's later arrest and assassination. As a result, South Kasai remained on relatively good terms with the new Congolese government from 1961. Its leaders, including Kalonji himself, served in both the South Kasaian government and the Congolese parliament. South Kasai continued to exercise quasi-independence while Congolese and United Nations troops were able to move through the territory without conflict with the South Kasaian gendarmerie. In April 1961, Kalonji took the royal title Mulopwe ("King of the Baluba") to tie the state more closely to the pre-colonial Luba Empire. The act divided the South Kasaian authorities and Kalonji was disavowed by the majority of South Kasai's parliamentary representatives in Léopoldville. (Note: During the period of Mobutu Sese Seko's rule in the Congo (1965–97), large numbers of place names created during the colonial period were changed as part of his authenticité campaign. For the modern equivalents, see former place names in the Democratic Republic of the Congo.) In December 1961, Kalonji was arrested on a legal pretext in Léopoldville and imprisoned, and Ferdinand Kazadi assumed power as acting head of state. UN and Congolese troops occupied South Kasai. In September 1962, shortly after his escape from prison and return to South Kasai, Kalonji was ousted by a military coup d'état which forced him into exile and brought the secession to an end.

The end of South Kasai's secession is usually held to be either December 1961, the date of Kalonji's arrest, or October 1962 with the anti-Kalonji coup d'état and final arrival of government troops.

== Background ==
=== Colonial rule ===
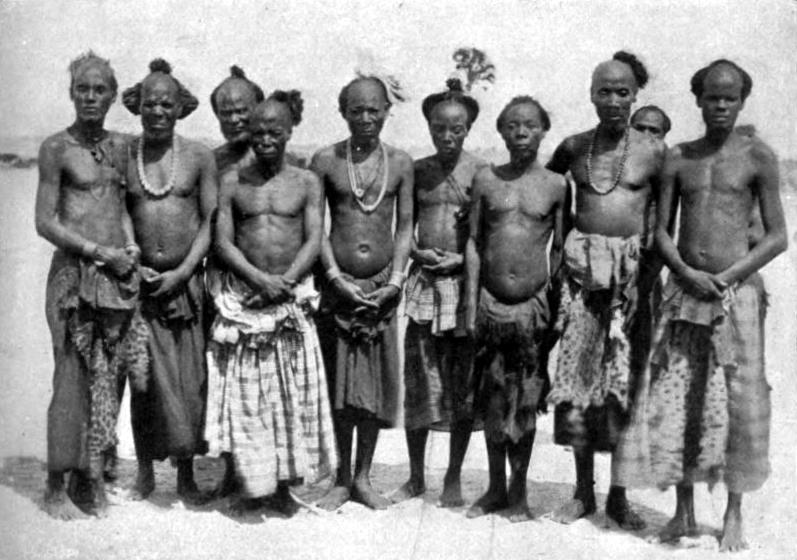
Luba chiefs of the Congo Free State, c. 1900

European colonial rule in the Congo began in the late 19th century. King Leopold II of Belgium, frustrated by his country's lack of international power and prestige, attempted to persuade the Belgian government to support colonial expansion around the then-largely unexplored Congo Basin. The Belgian government's ambivalence about the idea led Leopold to eventually create the colony on his own account. With support from a number of Western countries, who viewed Leopold as a useful buffer between rival colonial powers, Leopold achieved international recognition for a personal colony, the Congo Free State, in 1885. The Luba Empire, the largest regional power in the Kasai region, was annexed into the new state in 1889. By the turn of the century, the violence of Free State officials against indigenous Congolese and the ruthless system of economic extraction had led to intense diplomatic pressure on Belgium to take official control of the country, which it did in 1908, creating the Belgian Congo.

Belgian rule in the Congo was based around the "colonial trinity" (trinité coloniale) of state, missionary and private company interests. The privileging of Belgian commercial interests meant that large amounts of capital flowed into the Congo and that individual regions became specialised. On many occasions, the interests of the government and private enterprise became closely tied and the state helped companies break strikes and remove other barriers imposed by the indigenous population. The country was split into hierarchically-organised administrative subdivisions, and run uniformly according to a set "native policy" (politique indigène) – in contrast to the British and the French, who generally favoured the system of indirect rule whereby traditional leaders were retained in positions of authority under colonial oversight.

=== Ethnicity ===
Before the start of the colonial period, the region of South Kasai formed part of the Luba Empire, a federation of local kingdoms with a degree of cultural uniformity. During the 17th and 18th centuries, the Baluba spread across large parts of the Kasai-Katanga savannah along the Kasai river basin and eventually developed into a number of ethnic subgroups, notably the Luba-Kasai and the Luba-Katanga. Although never united into a single centralised state, the groups retained a degree of emotional attachment based around shared origin myths and cultural practices. Other groups, like the Songye and the Kanyok, also had long histories in the Kasai region.

One of the major legacies of colonial rule in Kasai was the arbitrary redivision of the population into new ethnic groups. Despite the shared language (Tshiluba) and culture of the two groups, colonial administrators believed the inhabitants of the Lulua river area to be ethnically different from the Baluba and dubbed them the Bena Lulua. The colonists believed the Baluba to be more intelligent, hardworking and open to new ideas than the Bena Lulua. As a result, from the 1930s, the state began to treat the two groups differently and applied different policies to each and promoted the Baluba to positions above other ethnicities.

During the 1950s when the Belgians began to fear that the rise of a powerful Luba elite would become a threat to colonial rule, the administration began to support Lulua organisations. This further contributed to the growing ethnic polarisation between the two groups. In 1952, an organisation called the Lulua Frères (Lulua Brothers) was established to campaign for socio-economic advancement of the Lulua group and became an unofficial representative of the Bena Lulua. In 1959, Luba-Lulua animosity was brought to a head by the discovery of a colonial proposal to move Luba farmers out of Lulua land to the less fertile land on Luba territory. As a result, hostility increased and violent clashes broke out. In August 1959, Luba demonstrations against the plan which were violently repressed by the colonial military and police. Attempts to broker peace between the two ethnic groups persisted into early 1960 but were unsuccessful.

=== Nationalist movement and Congolese politics ===
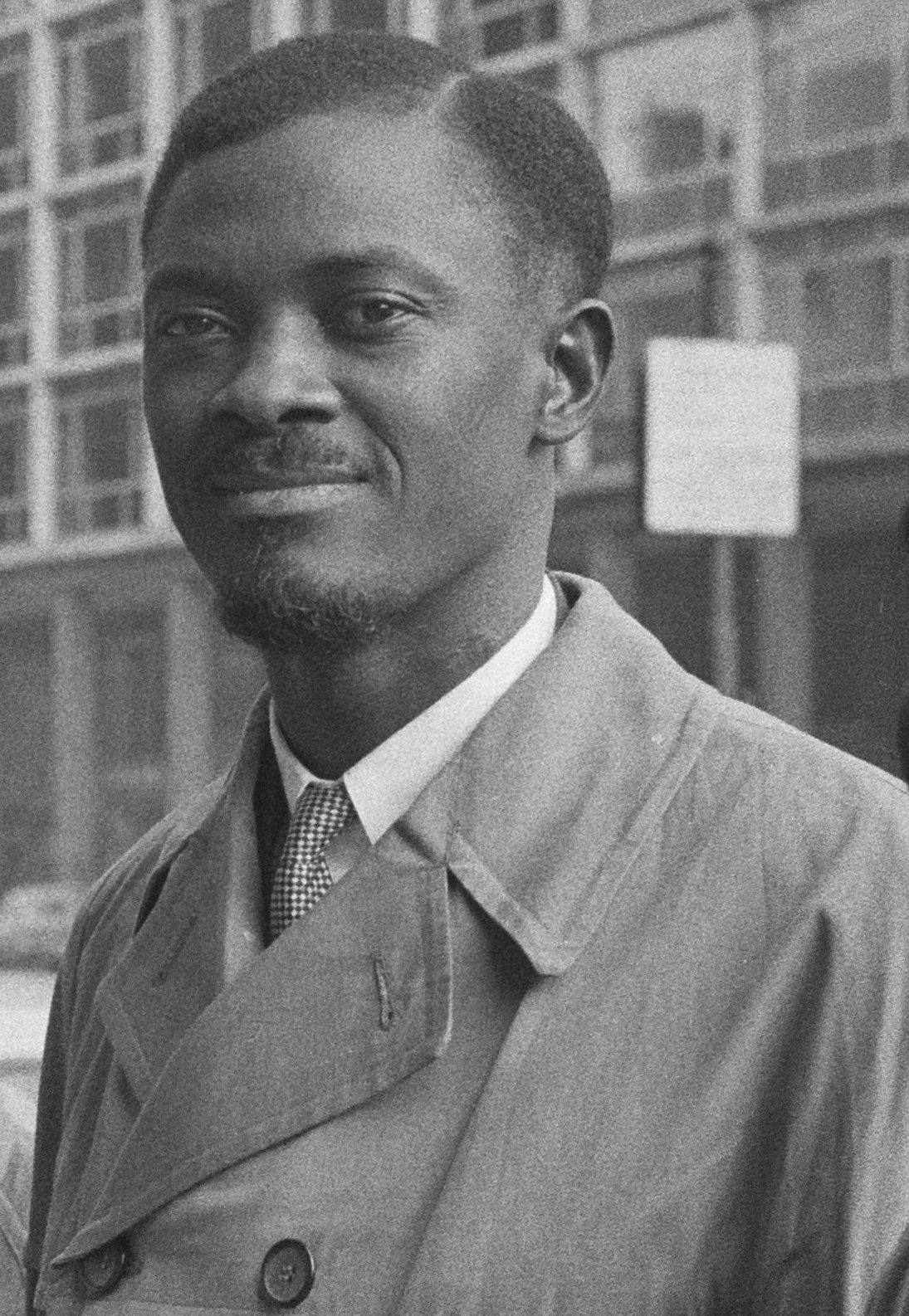
Patrice Lumumba split with Kalonji in 1959 and denied his supporters roles in central government.

==== Congolese nationalism ====
An anti-colonial Pan-African and nationalist movement developed in the Belgian Congo during the 1950s, primarily among the évolué class (the urbanised black bourgeoisie). The movement was divided into a number of parties and groups which were broadly divided on ethnic and geographical lines and opposed to one another. The largest, the Mouvement National Congolais (MNC), was a united front organisation dedicated to achieving independence "within a reasonable" time. It was created around a charter which was signed by, among others, Patrice Lumumba, Cyrille Adoula and Joseph Iléo. Lumumba became a leading figure and by the end of 1959, the party claimed to have 58,000 members. However, many found the MNC was too moderate. A number of other parties emerged, distinguished by their radicalism, support for federalism or centralism and affiliation to certain ethnic groupings. The MNC's main rival was the Alliance des Bakongo (ABAKO) led by Joseph Kasa-Vubu, a more radical party supported among the Kongo people in the north, and Moïse Tshombe's Confédération des Associations Tribales du Katanga (CONAKAT), a strongly federalist party in the southern Katanga Province.

==== Kalonji-Lumumba split and polarisation ====
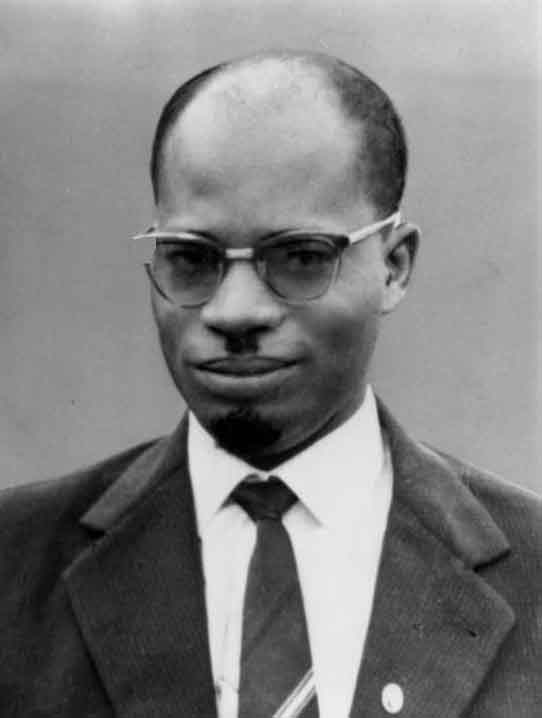
Albert Kalonji broke with Lumumba and later led the secession of South Kasai.

Although it was the largest of the African nationalist parties, the MNC had many different factions within it that took differing stances on a number of issues. It was increasingly polarised between moderate évolués and the more radical mass membership. A radical and federalist faction headed by Ileo and Albert Kalonji split away in July 1959, but failed to induce mass defections by other MNC members. The dissident faction became known as the MNC-Kalonji (MNC-K), while the majority group became the MNC-Lumumba (MNC-L). The split divided the party's support base into those who endured with Lumumba, chiefly in the Stanleyville region in the north-east, and those who backed the MNC-K, popular in the south and among Kalonji's own ethnic group, the Baluba. The MNC-K later formed a cartel with ABAKO and the Parti Solidaire Africain (PSA) to call for a united, but federalised, Congo.

The 1960 elections degenerated into an "anti-Baluba plebiscite" in Kasai. The MNC-K, campaigning on a platform of preserving Luba interests, won 21 of the 70 seats in the provincial assembly and eight seats in the Leopoldville Parliament. Other parties, many representing smaller ethnic groups, organised against the MNC-K under the MNC-L's leadership. Voters in northern Kasai showed favor towards the MNC-L—since Lumumba had grown up there—while in the south division occurred between the Lulua and Luba. An anti-MNC-K coalition led by the MNC-L formed to control the provincial assembly and thus determined the provincial leaders. Lumumba promoted a Lulua candidate, Barthélemy Mukenge, as provincial president while Kalonji was denied an important ministerial portfolio in Lumumba's national government. Kalonji refused Lumumba's offer of the Agriculture portfolio. Mukenge attempted to form a government of unity in the province, even offering MNC-K member Joseph Ngalula a place in his cabinet. Ngalula rejected the offer and on 14 June the MNC-K resolved to establish an alternative government under his leadership. Kalonji did not recognise this government as having any authority.

The Kalonjists, who felt rejected and marginalised by the central government, began supporting alternative parties. Among them, the Kalonjists supported Tshombe's CONAKAT party in nearby Katanga which, because of its strongly federalist stance, opposed to Lumumba's conception of a strong central government based in the capital Léopoldville. As part of this, the Kalonjists supported CONAKAT against their main local rivals, the Association Générale des Baluba du Katanga (BALUBAKAT) party led by Jason Sendwe, which, although it represented the Baluba of Katanga Province, was in favour of centralism. The Kalonjists, who believed themselves to be acting on behalf of all the Luba-Kasai, created an animosity between the Luba-Kasai and the Luba-Katanga but also failed to gain the full support of CONAKAT, much of which had racial prejudice against the Baluba and supported only the "authentic Katangese".

== Secession ==
=== Persecution of the Baluba ===
The Republic of the Congo received independence on 30 June 1960 with Kasa-Vubu as president and Lumumba as prime minister. The Chamber of the Léopoldville Parliament had convened one week prior to review Lumumba's cabinet and give it a vote of confidence. During the session, Kalonji, in his capacity as an elected deputy, criticised the proposed cabinet, expressing dissatisfaction that his party had not been consulted in its formation and declaring that he was proud not to be included in an "anti-Baluba" and "anti-Batshoke" (Note: The Batshoke were an ethnic group that was allied with the Baluba.) government which had shown contempt for the wishes of Kasai's people. He also stated his intentions to encourage the Baluba and Batshoke to refrain from participating in the government and to take his own steps to form a sovereign state centered in Bakwanga.

On 26 June, MNC-K officials petitioned the Léopoldville Parliament to peacefully divide the Province of Kasai along the lines suggested by Kalonji. The motion, which would have required the modification of the Congo's new constitution (Loi fondamentale), was received by a legislature divided between Lumumba and Kasa-Vubu factions and no agreement could be reached.

In the aftermath of independence, ethnic tensions flared up across the country, much of it directed against the Baluba, and a number of violent clashes occurred. On 3 July the central government ordered the arrest of the rival MNC-K Kasai government, precipitating unrest in Luluabourg. Despite rejecting earlier proposals for Luba repatriations to the province in January 1960, the Kalonjists made an official call to the Baluba across the Congo to return to their Kasaian "homeland" on 16 July. Initially, the Kalonjists envisaged the division of Kasai Province in two in order to allow for the creation of a quasi-autonomous MNC-K and Luba-dominated provincial government. The proposed province was termed the Federated State of South Kasai (État fédératif du Sud-Kasaï). Rapidly, however, Kalonji realised that the chaos in the rest of the Congo could be used to secede unilaterally and declare full local independence. This decision was further re-enforced by the full secession of the State of Katanga (État du Katanga), led by Tshombe, on 11 July 1960. Kalonji visited Katanga at the start of August 1960, shortly after its secession, where, on 8 August, he declared that Kasai "must be divided at all costs."

=== Secession ===
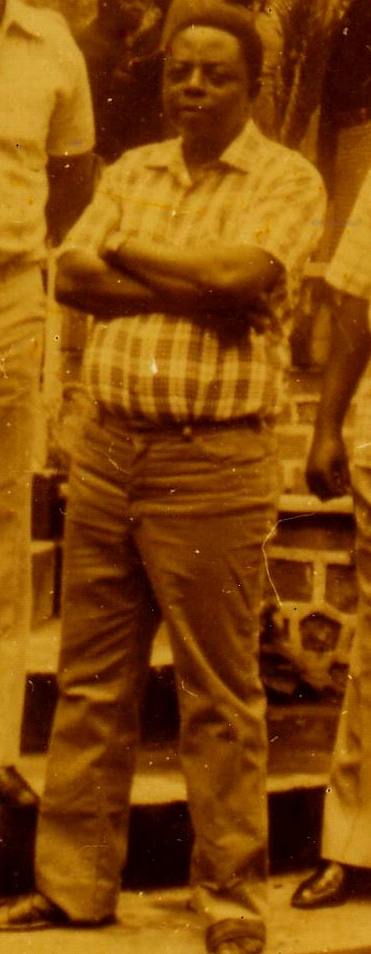
Joseph Ngalula was appointed Prime Minister of South Kasai.

On 9 August 1960, Kalonji, still in Katanga, declared the region of south-eastern Kasai to be the new Mining State of South Kasai (État minier du Sud-Kasaï) or Autonomous State of South Kasai (État autonome du Sud-Kasaï). (Note: In the period shortly after its formation, South Kasai's official title remained unclear. Beside État autonome or État minier, it is sometimes termed Province of the Luba (Province muluba) or Mining Province (Province minier). The use of the word "state" (état) was deliberately ambiguous, allowing Kalonji to avoid specifying whether the South Kasai claimed to independence as a nation-state in imitation of Katanga, or as a province within the Congo.) The declared borders of South Kasai included all of Kasai Province except Sankuru District and Lulua District, though in fact the Kalonjists controlled a much smaller portion of territory.

Unlike Katanga, however, South Kasai's secession did not explicitly mean the rejection of its position within the Republic of the Congo. Rather, it resembled the self-declared local governments in Équateur Province. The "Autonomous State" title was chosen in order to re-enforce the impression that the secession was not a rejection of Congolese sovereignty, but the creation of a federally-governed region of the Congo. The secession had some support among journalists, intellectuals and politicians in Léopoldville, with one newspaper calling it "a model by which the many new states now mushrooming in the Congo might form a new federation". In practice South Kasai had considerably more independence than a regular province and, by mandating its own federated powers unilaterally, was effectively seceding from the Congo. It also did not forward any taxes to the central government and locals—drawing a comparison to the secessionist state to the south—sometimes referred to it as "Little Katanga". MNC-K deputies also initially refused to sit in the Congolese Parliament in Léopoldville.

Kalonji was declared president and Joseph Ngalula prime minister. Although the Luba-Kasai had never lived in a single state before, Kalonji was able to gain the broad support of the Luba chiefs for the secession. He was able to portray the secession internationally as the result of the persecution and the failure of the Congolese government to sufficiently protect the Baluba in the rest of the Congo. South Kasai's borders frequently changed, never stabilizing during its brief existence. The state's capital was Bakwanga. In 1962 its population was estimated at 2,000,000.

=== Governance ===
Once established in power, Kalonji positioned himself personally as a "big man" and the patron from whom state power originated. Tribal leaders from Luba and other ethnic groups enjoyed a close, client-like relationship with Kalonji himself and received preferential treatment in exchange for services rendered. In particular, Kalonji was reliant on tribal leaders to mobilise paramilitaries to support the South Kasaian army. Governance of South Kasai was complicated by the dynamic Luba politics in which it was embedded. Tensions rose between Kalonji and Ngalula, who had different ideas for how the state was to be run; Kalonji wanted the government to be based in tradition and relied on customary chiefs, while Ngalula preferred a democratic system and worked with the intellectual elite. South Kasai had five different governments in the first few months of its existence.

The immediate internal problems faced by South Kasai were large number of unsettled Luba refugees and internal dissent from non-Luba minorities. The state was able to direct money from diamond exporting and foreign support to fund public services which allowed Luba refugees to be settled in employment. Social services were "relatively well-run". State revenue was estimated to total $30,000,000 annually. The state produced three constitutions, with the first being promulgated in November 1960 and the last on 12 July 1961. The July constitution transformed the state into the Federated State of South Kasai (État fédéré du Sud-Kasaï), declaring the state itself both "sovereign and democratic" but also part of a hypothetical "Federal Republic of the Congo". The constitution also provided for a bicameral legislature, with a lower chamber composed of all national deputies, senators, and provincial assemblymen elected in constituencies within South Kasai's territory, and an upper chamber filled by traditional chiefs. A judicial system was organised, with justices of the peace, magistrates' courts, and a court of appeal. The state had its own flag and coat of arms, published its own official journal, the Moniteur de l'État Autonome du Sud-Kasaï, and even produced its own postage stamps, (Note: South Kasai issued a total of 28 unique postage stamps and one souvenir sheet, all in 1961.) and vehicle registration plates. Unlike Katanga, South Kasai maintained no diplomatic missions abroad. The Congolese franc was retained as the state's currency.

The South Kasaian army or gendarmerie grew from just 250 members at its inception to nearly 3,000 by 1961. It was led by 22-year-old "General" Floribert Dinanga with the assistance of nine European officers. In 1961, the military led a campaign to expand the size of the state's territory at the expense of neighbouring ethnic groups. Despite receiving some support from Belgium, the gendarmerie was poorly equipped and constantly low on supplies and ammunition.

As government authority in South Kasai was consolidated, the regime became increasingly militaristic and authoritarian. Non-Luba groups were increasingly marginalised. Political opponents were killed or driven into exile, including Ngalula, who had a falling out with Kalonji in July 1961. Non-Luba groups in the region, especially the Kanyok, fought a constant but low-level insurgency against the South Kasaian government.

=== International support ===
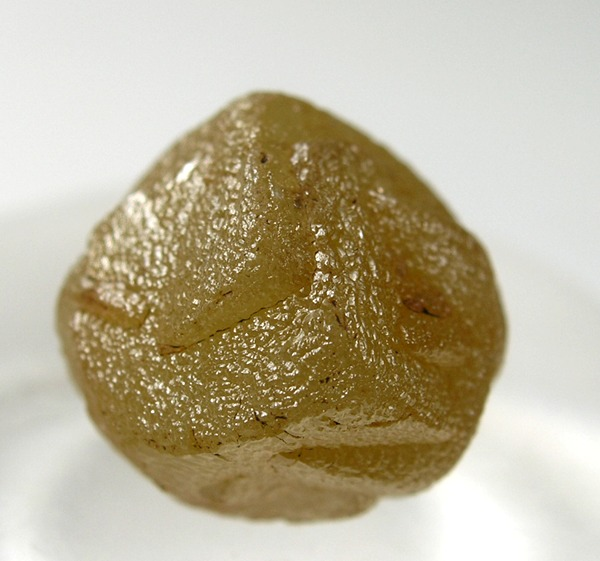
An uncut yellow diamond from South Kasai; diamond exporting was a major asset to the state.

Kalonji went to great lengths to secure international recognition and support for the state of South Kasai. The former colonial power, Belgium, distrusted the Congolese central government and supported both the governments of South Kasai and Katanga. Like Katanga, South Kasai had important mineral deposits, including diamond fields, and Belgian companies had large sums of money tied up in mines in the area. A Belgian company, Forminière, was the state's principal supporter and received concessions from South Kasai in exchange for financial support. Because of the early sponsorship the mining company, South Kasai was referred to derisively as the République de la Forminière. After the secession, South Kasai's diamonds were rerouted through Congo-Brazzaville for export to international markets. The comparatively large income from the mining companies (Note: An administrator of the Societé Minière de Bakwanga estimated that his company paid approximately $12,000,000 in taxes annually to the South Kasaian government. Other Belgians estimated that the regime, in taking half of the diamond mines' profits, extracted BEF 350,000,000 ($7,000,000) per year and an additional BEF 235,000,000 ($4,700,000) in excise taxes.) meant that South Kasai was able to support significant public services and cope with large numbers of internally-displaced Luba refugees. In the context of the Cold War, Kalonji was supported by Western powers and moderates in the Congolese government who viewed him as both a moderate pro-Westerner and anticommunist. Although both Katanga and South Kasai were supported by South Africa, France and the Central African Federation, neither state ever received any form of official diplomatic recognition. A South Kasaian delegation went to South Africa in September 1960 with a letter signed by Ngalula requesting military aid from Prime Minister Hendrik Verwoerd. The South African government refused to furnish military equipment but informed the delegation that they could purchase hardware offered on the South African market.

After the coup d'état which removed Lumumba from power, Kalonji tried to cultivate good relations with the Congolese government. General Joseph-Désiré Mobutu, in particular, was able to use South Kasai for the execution of his political opponents and dissident Lumumbists including Jean-Pierre Finant. Such activity led the secessionist state to be nicknamed "the national butcher's yard".

=== Kalonji as Mulopwe ===
Because of the importance of the Luba ethnicity to South Kasai, Kalonji used his support from the traditional Luba tribal authorities to have himself declared Mulopwe. The title, Mulopwe (usually translated as "King" or "Emperor"), was extremely symbolic because it was the title employed by the rulers of the pre-colonial Luba Empire and had been disused since the 1880s. By taking it, along with the extra name Ditunga ("homeland"), Kalonji was able to closely tie himself and the South Kasaian state to the Luba Empire to increase its legitimacy in the eyes of the Baluba. In order to avoid accusations of impropriety, the title was bestowed on Kalonji's father on 12 April 1961, who then immediately abdicated in favour of his son. With the accession of Kalonji to the title of Mulopwe on 16 July, the state's title changed to the Federated Kingdom of South Kasai (Royaume fédéré du Sud-Kasaï).

Kalonji's accession to the position of Mulopwe was heavily criticised even by many Luba in South Kasai. (Note: Some Kalonji detractors noted that the Luba Empire was historically centered in Katanga, not Kasai, and that the Kasai Baluba had never been led by a Mulopwe.) The move was also mocked in Western media. Kalonji remained popular among some groups, but lost the support of the South Kasaian évolués who saw his elevation as flagrant opportunism. Soon after his elevation, Kalonji was publicly condemned and disavowed by 10 of South Kasai's 13 representatives in the Léopoldville Parliament, beginning the disintegration of the secessionist state.

== Collapse and reintegration ==
=== Campaign of August–September 1960 ===
When South Kasai seceded, government troops from the Armée Nationale Congolaise (ANC) were already fighting Katangese troops in the Kasai region. South Kasai held important railway junctions needed by the Congolese army for its campaign in Katanga, and therefore soon became an important objective. South Kasai also had important mineral wealth which the central government was anxious to return to the Congo. The central government also misunderstood the South Kasaian position, believing that, like Katanga, the region had declared full independence from the Congo and rejected Congolese sovereignty.

"[The actions of the ANC in South Kasai] involve a most flagrant violation of elementary human rights and have the characteristics of the crime of genocide since they appear to be directed towards the extermination of a specific ethnic group, the Balubas [sic]."

— Dag Hammarskjöld, UN Secretary-General, September 1960

Initially, Lumumba hoped that the United Nations (UN), which sent a multi-national peacekeeping force to the Congo in July 1960, would help the central government suppress both Katangese and South Kasaian secessions. The UN was reluctant to do so, however, considering the secessions to be internal political matters and its own mission to be maintaining basic law and order. Rejected by both the UN and United States, Lumumba sought military support from the communist Soviet Union. Within days of the secession and with Soviet logistical support, 2,000 ANC troops launched a major offensive against South Kasai. The attack was successful. On 27 August, ANC soldiers arrived in Bakwanga.

During the course of the offensive, the ANC became involved in ethnic violence between the Baluba and Bena Lulua. When government troops arrived in Bakwanga, they released Lulua detainees from prison and began requisitioning civilian vehicles. When David Odia, the South Kasai Minister of Public Works, protested, soldiers beat him and fatally injured him. Many Baluba first fled in terror, but then began resisting with home-made shotguns. As a result, the ANC perpetrated a number of large massacres of Luba civilians. In September, Dag Hammarskjöld, the UN Secretary-General who had recently deployed a large peacekeeping force to the Congo, referred to the massacres as "a case of incipient genocide". The Baluba were also attacked by the Katangese from the south. In the ensuring massacres, in which ANC or Katangese troops often participated, around 3,000 Baluba were killed. The violence of the advance caused an exodus of many thousands of Luba civilians who fled their homes to escape the fighting; more than 35,000 went to refugee camps in Élisabethville (the capital of Katanga) alone. As many as 100,000 sought refuge in Bakwanga. Diseases, notably kwashiorkor but also malaria, smallpox and anemia, were widespread and reached "epidemic proportions" among Luba refugees between October and December 1960. The World Health Organization sent one million small pox vaccines to South Kasai to alleviate the problem. The epidemic had been preceded by widespread famine which by December was killing an estimated 200 people daily. The UN appealed to its member states for relief, and by late January government and private aid had reduced mortality by 75 percent. Further assistance in the form of an emergency food airlift, additional medical personnel, and seeds from the Food and Agriculture Organization ensured that the famine was almost entirely resolved by March 1961. UN relief workers were withdrawn following the April 1961 Port Francqui incident due to security concerns, though food aid continued to be brought to the border.

Allegations of genocide (Note: Though there has been little study of the ANC atrocities in South Kasai, no information has ever been presented to corroborate the notion that Lumumba or other officials intended to eliminate certain populations and the use of the term "genocide" was primarily a rhetorical device meant to damage his reputation.) and brutality by the ANC were used to provide legitimacy to Kasa-Vubu's dismissal of Lumumba, with the support of Mobutu, in September 1960. In the aftermath of the campaign, the South Kasaian state was able to provide substantial aid to its refugees, many of whom were resettled in homes and jobs. Nevertheless, the invasion caused considerable disruption to the local economy; by December the number of diamonds cut by Forminière and the number of people it employed both had fallen by thousands.

=== Coexistence and attempted reconciliation ===
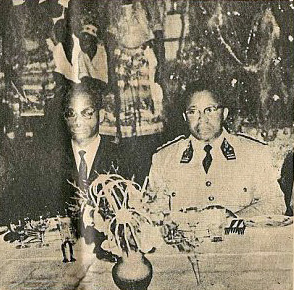
Kalonji with Congolese President Joseph Kasa-Vubu in 1961

Despite the occupation of South Kasai, the South Kasaian state was not dismantled and co-existed with the rest of the Congo. Congolese delegates, as well as ANC and UN troops were generally able to move around the territory without conflict with the South Kasaian authorities while their sporadic campaign against Katangese forces continued. A UN-sponsored ceasefire in September 1960 gave pause to the Luba-Lulua conflict, but by November Kalonji's forces had broken the truce. Throughout much of the period, the South Kasaian gendarmerie fought with Kanyok and Lulua militias across the region while local ethnic violence persisted. In January 1961 Kasa-Vubu flew to Bakwanga to meet with Kalonji. The trip began acrimoniously as Kasa-Vubu refused to recognise the South Kasaian honour guard present at the airport and ride in the provided limousine, which was flying the South Kasian flag. Kalonji eventually removed the flag and the two reconciled.

In mid-1961, conferences were held at Coquilhatville (modern-day Mbandaka) and later in Antananarivo, Madagascar to attempt to broker a peaceful reconciliation between the secessionist factions and the central government in the face of a rebel government in the Eastern Congo led by Antoine Gizenga. It was believed that, with Lumumba dead, it might be possible to create a federal constitution that could reconcile the three parties. The agreements instead led to more uncertainty. The ousting of Ngalula—the chief organiser of the South Kasai state—in July hastened internal collapse. He established his own political party, the Democratic Union, to oppose the Kalonjists. Later that month Parliament reconvened with Kalonji and the other South Kasain deputies in attendance. A new Congolese central government was formed on 2 August with Ngalula as Minister of Education, and Kalonji went back to South Kasai. In late October 1961 Kalonji and several Lulua leaders made a symbolic union in an attempt to end the Luba-Lulua tribal conflict.

=== Kalonji's arrest ===
Map showing the situation in the Congo in 1961 with the territory split between four opposing factions

On 2 December 1961, Kalonji was accused by another deputy, the communist Christophe Gbenye, of having ordered corporal punishment against a political prisoner in South Kasai. Parliament voted to remove Kalonji's parliamentary immunity and he was taken into custody by the ANC in Léopoldville. A delegation of around 400 Luba tribal elders sent to Léopoldville to protest were also briefly arrested. Mobutu and General Victor Lundula visited Bakwanga soon afterwards. Ferdinand Kazadi assumed power as acting head of state of South Kasai.

On 9 March 1962, the recently re-convened Léopoldville Parliament, under Prime Minister Cyrille Adoula, agreed to modify the Constitution and gave South Kasai official provincial status. In April 1962, UN troops were ordered to occupy South Kasai as part of Secretary-General U Thant's new aggressive stance against secession following Hammarskjöld's death. In Léopoldville, Kalonji was sentenced to five years' imprisonment. On 7 September, however, Kalonji escaped from prison and returned to South Kasai where he hoped to regain an official position in local elections and, at the head of a government, regain his immunity.

=== Coup d'état of September–October 1962 ===
As dissatisfaction with the secession grew, Ngalula and other South Kasaian émigrés in Léopoldville plotted to overthrow the regime in Bakwanga. In September 1962, the Léopoldville government appointed Albert Kankolongo, a former minister in Kalonji's government, as Special Commissioner (commissaire extraordinaire) for South Kasai, giving him full military and civil power, to dismantle the local state. Ngalula approached Kankolongo to lead a mutiny and coup d'état against Kalonji.

On the night of 29–30 September 1962, military commanders in South Kasai, led by Kankolongo, launched a coup d'état in Bakwanga against the Kalonjist regime. An appeal was broadcast over Radio Bakwanga to all officers of the South Kasaian gendarmerie to support the central government with the promise that they would integrated into the ANC at their current rank and pay. Kalonji and General Dinanga were placed under house arrest, while the other South Kasaian ministers were imprisoned in a single home. Kalonji and Dinanga escaped a few days later; the former took a lorry to Katanga. Kankolongo reacted by immediately flying out the remaining ministers to Léopoldville. On 5 October 1962, central government troops again arrived in Bakwanga to support the mutineers and help suppress the last Kalonjist loyalists, marking the end of the secession. Kalonji took up residence in Kamina and attempted to meet Tshombe, but was rebuffed by Katangese Minister of Interior Godefroid Munongo. He then fled to Paris before settling in Barcelona in Francisco Franco's Spain.

== Aftermath ==
=== In Kasai ===
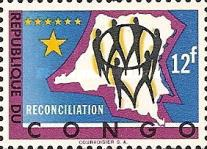
1963 stamp celebrating the "reconciliation" of South Kasai and Katanga with the Congolese central government

In October 1962, South Kasai returned to the Republic of the Congo. The State of Katanga continued to hold out against the central government until it too collapsed in January 1963 after UN forces began to take a more aggressive stance under Thant. As a compromise, South Kasai was one of the 21 provinces formally established by the federalist constitution of 1964. As the Mobutu regime launched a centralist restructuring of the Congolese state from 1965, South Kasai was one of the few provinces which were retained. The province was later restructured to include new territory in Kabinda and Sankuru Districts and renamed Eastern Kasai (Kasaï-Oriental).

The majority of the South Kasaian soldiers were integrated into the ANC after the dissolution of the state but nearly 2,000 loyalists went into hiding to await Kalonji's possible restoration. The rebels were led by General Mwanzambala and fought a guerrilla war against the new provincial government until 1963 when they also accepted integration into the ANC. Soon after the end of the secession, the city of Bakwanga was renamed Mbuji-Mayi after the local river in an attempt to signify a Luba intra-ethnicity reconciliation. Regardless, violence among Luba factions lasted through 1964, and a political solution was not reached until 1965 with the election of J. Mukamba as Provincial President of South Kasai.

=== End of the Congo Crisis ===
In 1965, Mobutu launched a second coup d'état against the central government and took personal emergency powers. Once established as the sole source of political power, Mobutu gradually consolidated his control in the Congo. The number of provinces was reduced, and their autonomy curtailed, resulting in a highly centralised state. Mobutu increasingly placed his supporters in the remaining positions of importance. In 1967, to illustrate his legitimacy, he created a party, the Popular Movement of the Revolution (MPR), which until 1990 was the nation's only legal political party under Mobutu's revised constitution. In 1971, the state was renamed Zaire and efforts were made to remove all colonial influences. He also nationalised the remaining foreign-owned economic assets in the country. Over time Zaire was increasingly characterised by widespread cronyism, corruption, and economic mismanagement. Dissatisfaction with the regime in Kasaï-Oriental was particularly strong.

The issues of federalism, ethnicity in politics, and state centralisation were not resolved by the crisis and partly contributed to a decline in support for the concept of the state among Congolese people. Mobutu was strongly in favour of centralisation and one of his first acts, in 1965, were to reunify provinces and abolish much of their independent legislative capacity. Subsequent loss of faith in central government is one of the reasons that the Congo has been labeled as a failed state, and has contributed violence by factions advocating ethnic and localised federalism.

== See also ==
- Article 15 (Democratic Republic of the Congo) — popular idiom referring to South Kasai's constitution
- Decolonisation of Africa
- Conflict diamonds
- Biafra

== Notes and references ==
=== Books ===
- Akyeampong, Emmanuel Kwaku; Gates, Henry Louis, eds. (2012). Dictionary of African Biography. Vol. 3. New York: Oxford University Press USA. ISBN 978-0-19-538207-5.
- Boulden, Jane (2001). Peace Enforcement: The United Nations Experience in Congo, Somalia, and Bosnia (1st ed.). Westport, Conn.: Praeger. ISBN 0-275-96906-1.
- Bring, Ove (2011). Hammarskjöld's approach to the United Nations and international law. Documentos. Chile: Instituto de estudios internacionales.
- French, Howard W. (2007). A Continent for the Taking: The Tragedy and Hope of Africa (reprint ed.). Knopf Doubleday Publishing Group. ISBN 9780307424303.
- Freund, Bill (1998). The Making of Contemporary Africa: The Development of African Society since 1800 (2nd ed.). Basingstoke: Palgrave-Macmillan. ISBN 978-0-333-69872-3.
- Gondola, Charles Didier (2002). The History of Congo. Wesport (Conn.): Greenwood. ISBN 0-313-31696-1.
- Haskin, Jeanne M. (2005). The Tragic State of the Congo: From Decolonization to Dictatorship. New York: Algora Publishing. ISBN 0-87586-416-3.
- Hoskyns, Catherine (1965). The Congo Since Independence: January 1960 – December 1961. London: Oxford University Press. OCLC 414961.
- Janzen, Eileen R. (2013). Growing to One World: The Life of J. King Gordon. McGill-Queen's Press. ISBN 9780773589629.
- Kanza, Thomas R. (1994). The Rise and Fall of Patrice Lumumba: Conflict in the Congo (expanded ed.). Rochester, Vermont: Schenkman Books, Inc. ISBN 0-87073-901-8.
- MacGaffey, Wyatt, ed. (1962). Area Handbook for the Republic of the Congo (Leopoldville). Washington D.C.: American University Foreign Areas Studies Division. OCLC 1347356.
- Nugent, Paul (2004). Africa since Independence: A Comparative History. New York: Palgrave-MacMillan. ISBN 978-0-333-68273-9.
- Nzongola-Ntalaja, Georges (2007). The Congo, From Leopold to Kabila: A People's History (3rd ed.). New York: Palgrave. ISBN 978-1-84277-053-5.
- O'Ballance, Edgar (1999). The Congo-Zaire Experience, 1960–98 (illustrated ed.). London: Springer. ISBN 9780230286481.
- Olivier, Lanotte (6 April 2010). "Chronology of the Democratic Republic of Congo/Zaire (1960-1997)". Online Encyclopedia of Mass Violence. Archived from the original on 12 May 2019.
- Omasombo Tshonda, Jean, ed. (2014). Kasaï-Oriental: Un nœud gordien dans l'espace congolais (PDF) (in French). Tervuren: Musée royal de l’Afrique centrale. ISBN 978-9-4916-1524-5. Archived (PDF) from the original on 27 October 2018.
- Othen, Christopher (2015). Katanga 1960–63: Mercenaries, Spies and the African Nation that Waged War on the World (illustrated ed.). The History Press. ISBN 9780750965804.
- Packham, Eric S. (1996). Freedom and Anarchy. New York: Nova Science. ISBN 1-56072-232-0.
- Pakenham, Thomas (1992). The Scramble for Africa: the White Man's Conquest of the Dark Continent from 1876 to 1912 (13th ed.). London: Abacus. ISBN 978-0-349-10449-2.
- Pandey, Gyanendra; Geschiere, Peter (2003). The Forging of Nationhood. Manohar. ISBN 9788173044250.
- Passemiers, Lazlo (2019). Decolonisation and Regional Geopolitics : South Africa and the 'Congo Crisis', 1960–1965 (online ed.). London: Routledge. ISBN 9781351138161.
- Simmonds, R. (2012). Legal problems arising from the United Nations military operations in the Congo (illustrated ed.). Springer. ISBN 9789401192675.
- Stapleton, Timothy J. (2017). A History of Genocide in Africa. ABC-CLIO. ISBN 9781440830525. Archived from the original on 11 December 2024.
- Turner, Thomas (2007). The Congo Wars: Conflict, Myth, and Reality (2nd ed.). London: Zed Books. ISBN 978-1-84277-688-9.
- UN-CHS (1991). The Management of Secondary Cities in Sub-Saharan Africa: Traditional and Modern Institutional Arrangements. Nairobi: United Nations Centre for Human Settlements (Habitat). ISBN 978-92-1-131160-0.
- Weiss, Herbert (2019). Political Protest in the Congo : the Parti Solidaire Africain During the Independence Struggle (reprint ed.). Princeton: Princeton University Press. ISBN 9780691655505. Archived from the original on 11 December 2025.
- Willame, Jean-Claude (1972). Patrimonialism and Political Change in the Congo. Stanford: Stanford University Press. ISBN 0-8047-0793-6.
- Williams, Susan (2021). White Malice : The CIA and the Covert Recolonization of Africa. New York: PublicAffairs. ISBN 978-1-5417-6829-1.
- De Witte, Ludo (2001). The Assassination of Lumumba. Translated by Wright, Ann; Fenby, Renée. London: Verso. ISBN 978-1-85984-618-6. OCLC 1028192223.
- Young, M. Crawford (1965). Politics in the Congo: Decolonization and Independence. Princeton: Princeton University Press. OCLC 307971.
- Zeilig, Leo (2008). Lumumba: Africa's Lost Leader. London: Haus. ISBN 978-1-905791-02-6.

=== Journals ===
- Dufresne, André (January 2011). "Les Timbres-poste du Sud-Kasaï" (PDF). Philatélie Québec (292): 25–31. Archived from the original (PDF) on 15 August 2011.
- Lowenstein, Frank W. (1962). "An Epidemic of Kwashiorkor in the South Kasai, Congo" (PDF). Bulletin of the World Health Organization. 27 (6): 751–758. PMC 2555843. PMID 20604126. Archived from the original (PDF) on 27 January 2005.
- "Onze mois de crise politique au Congo". Courrier Hebdomadaire du CRISP (in French). 120 (30). Centre de recherche et d'information socio-politiques: 1–24. 1961. doi:10.3917/cris.120.0001.
- Rubbens, A. (1961). "La décolonisation du droit et de l'organisation judiciaire dans la République du Congo" (PDF). Bulletins des Séances (in French). 7 (6): 798–808. Archived (PDF) from the original on 17 September 2021.

=== News ===
- "Mukenge Announces Kasai Government". Belgian Congo Home Service. Léopoldville. 17 June 1960. p. I1. Via Daily Report: Foreign Radio Broadcasts. 1960.
- Mopipi, Jacky (15 March 2010). "Que sont-ils devenus?: Albert Kalonji-Ditunga dit Mulopwe". Congo Indépendant. Archived from the original on 4 September 2017.
- EISA. "DRC: Background to the 1965 election". Electoral Institute for Sustainable Democracy in Africa (EISA). Archived from the original on 25 July 2014.
- Ngapi, Rich (15 August 2008). "Congo-Kinshasa: Le 8 août 1960, Albert Kalonji proclame l'autonomie du Sud-Kasaï". Le Potentiel. Archived from the original on 16 May 2010.
- Snee, Charles (15 September 2017). "The stamps of short-lived South Kasai, spreadsheet stamp images: Inside Linn's". Linn's Stamp News. Archived from the original on 29 December 2017.
- Hofmann, Paul (3 November 1960). "'Civil War' in South Kasai Reported by U.N. in Congo". The New York Times. pp. 1, 8. ProQuest 115109726.(subscription required)
- Halberstam, David (19 February 1962a). "Rich Diamond Mines at Stake In Congo-South Kasai Struggle : Secession Continues Despite Arrest of State's Leader by Central Regime– Negotiations on Status in Progress". The New York Times. p. 2. ProQuest 115673183.(subscription required)
- Garrison, Lloyd (9 September 1962b). "Kalonji, 'King' of South Kasai, Out of Congo Jail". The New York Times. p. 22. ProQuest 115736669.(subscription required)
