= Jonas Mukamba Kadiata Nzemba =

Democratic Republic of the Congo politician

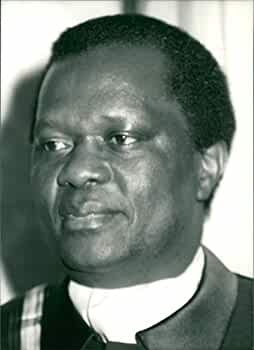

Governor of Sud-Kasaï Province
- In office August 1965 – 25 April 1966
- Preceded by: Joseph Ngalula
- Succeeded by: .

Governor of Kasaï Oriental Province
- In office 25 April 1966 – 3 January 1967
- Preceded by: .
- Succeeded by: Henri-Désiré Takizala

Governor of Équateur Province
- In office 3 January 1967 – 9 August 1968
- Preceded by: Léon Engulu
- Succeeded by: Denis Paluku

Governor of Orientale Province
- In office 9 August 1968 – 19 October 1968
- Preceded by: Michel Denge
- Succeeded by: Anaclet Kaniki

Governor of Équateur Province
- In office 27 August 1980 – 19 March 1983
- Preceded by: Mpambia Musanga Bekaja
- Succeeded by: Kititwa Tumansi Benga Tundu

Personal details
- Born: January 4, 1931 (age 95)

Jonas Mukamba Kadiata Nzemba (born January 4, 1931) is a politician from the Democratic Republic of the Congo and former chairman of the state-run diamond company MIBA.

== Biography ==
Jonas Mukamba was born of Ilunga Lubumbashie and Ngomba Shilumbayi. He completed his primary education at the Mayi-Munene Catholic mission in Tshikapa. He pursued his secondary education at the minor seminary in the locality of Kabwe near Kananga, then studied in Belgium in the late 1950s at Catholic University of Leuven.

=== Congo Crisis and aftermath ===
In 1960 Mukamba was a close associate of Albert Kalonji and thus became an opponent of Patrice Lumumba and his nationalist government. He was appointed a Commissioner for the Interior in the College of Commissioners-General which acted as the country's executive body following Lumumba's dismissal in September 1960.

On 17 January 1961, together with Commissioner for Defense Ferdinand Kazadi, Mukamba was one of the two Congolese government representatives who escorted the captive Lumumba together with his associates Maurice Mpolo and Joseph Okito in the air transfer from Muanda Airport to Elisabethville airport (now Lubumbashi International Airport), during which the three prisoners were severely beaten by Congolese soldiers. Between beatings, Lumumba had a conversation with Mukamba, pleading that Mukamba not hand him over to Moise Tshombe which Lumumba correctly understood would mean his assassination. Mukamba later claimed that Lumumba had almost persuaded him. After having delivered the prisoners to the authorities of the secessionist State of Katanga at the airport, Mukamba did not participate in the later steps leadeing to Lumumba's assassination. He attended a celebratory reunion at Tshombe's residence in the late afternoon, then went to dinner at a restaurant with Kazadi.

In 1961 he also completed his studies at Louvain, graduating with a degree in political and administrative sciences.

Between August 1965 and October 1968 he was governor in turn of South Kasai, Kasaï-Oriental, Équateur and Orientale Province. He was again governor of Équateur Province between 27 August 1980 and 19 March 1983.

=== Head of Miba ===
Zaire's president Mobutu Sese Seko appointed Nzemba the chief executive officer of the state's main diamond mining company, the Societé minière de Bakwanga (MIBA) in 1986. Based in the city of Mbuji-Mayi, formerly Bakwanga, the company provided as much as 80 percent of the world's industrial diamonds, but other than mining operations which provided much-needed hard currency, the region was widely neglected by Mobutu and the central government. Throughout the 1980s and 1990s, Zaire and Mobutu paid little attention to Mbuji-Mayi, offering almost no money to build roads, schools or hospitals.

In the political vacuum, MIBA, stepped in. In the place of the federal government, MIBA invested heavily in the region - repairing roads, paying soldiers and supplying water and electricity to the city from its own power station. The company set up a social fund of $5 to $6 million a year, or roughly 8 percent of its annual budget. This money not only went for infrastructure repair, but also to fund a new university.

These investments and position as largest employer made Nzemba one of the most powerful men in the region, and de facto governor of Mbuji-Mayi. Nzemba was considered one of the more powerful players in Mobutu's political party, the Mouvement Populaire pour le Revolution (MPR), but also called himself a "brother" of Étienne Tshisekedi, a popular local political figure and Mobutu's most significant political opposition.

During his time as head of MIBA, Nzemba is credited with creating the Conference pour le Developpement Economique de Kasai Oriental (CDEKO), a regional economic development group in the early 1990s. Nzemba also backed the creation of the University of Kasai, which was jointly sponsored by MIBA and the local Catholic church, and which became the home base of CDEKO. The new organization spearheaded economic growth in Mbuji-Mayi, helping support the development of new agricultural and beer industry expansion around the city, and launched Wetrafa, a locally owned airline.

But, Mobutu's willingness to let Nzemba control the province through MIBA came at a price - Nzemba may have skimmed as much as $1.5 to $2 million a month to send to Mobutu's personal bank accounts.

As the First Congo War broke out, Nzemba initially sided with Mobutu against the rebels led by Laurent-Désiré Kabila, but as Kabila's Alliance of Democratic Forces for the Liberation of Congo-Zaire (AFDL or ADFLC) approached the city, Nzemba quickly switched sides. Nzemba declared that he was ready to work with AFDL a week before the fall of Mbuji-Mayi.

When the city fell to the rebels on April 4, 1997, Nzemba was summoned to Goma to speak with Kabila, who held him for several days, prompting his family to purchase advertising in newspapers publicizing their concerns for his safety. Nzemba was released shortly after, but MIBA began making "voluntary contributions" to Kabila's war effort - totaling an estimated $5.5 million in 1997 and 1998.

=== Post Civil War ===
He ran for president in the 2006 presidential election, receiving 0.24% of the vote.
