= Dibindi =

- Commune
- Country: Democratic Republic of the Congo
- City: Mbuji-Mayi

Population (2017)
  - Total: 295,768
- Time zone: UTC+2 (CAT)

Dibindi is a commune of the city of Mbuji-Mayi in the Democratic Republic of the Congo. It is one of the main urban communes that form the city.

== Geography ==
Dibindi is located in the central part of Mbuji-Mayi, the capital of Kasaï-Oriental Province. The commune is part of the larger urban area and plays a significant role in the city's social and economic activities.

== Population ==
According to available estimates, Dibindi has a population of nearly 300,000 inhabitants, making it one of the most densely populated communes of Mbuji-Mayi.

== Administration ==
The commune of Dibindi is administered by a local mayor (bourgmestre) who oversees municipal governance, basic services, and coordination with the city authorities of Mbuji-Mayi.

== Economy ==
As a highly urbanized commune, Dibindi hosts markets, small businesses, and community services that contribute to the economy of Mbuji-Mayi. Informal trade is common, and the commune plays a role in the diamond trade, which is significant in the region.

== See also ==
- Mbuji-Mayi
- Communes of the Democratic Republic of the Congo
