= Bipemba =

Coordinates: 6.1063°S 23.5590°E

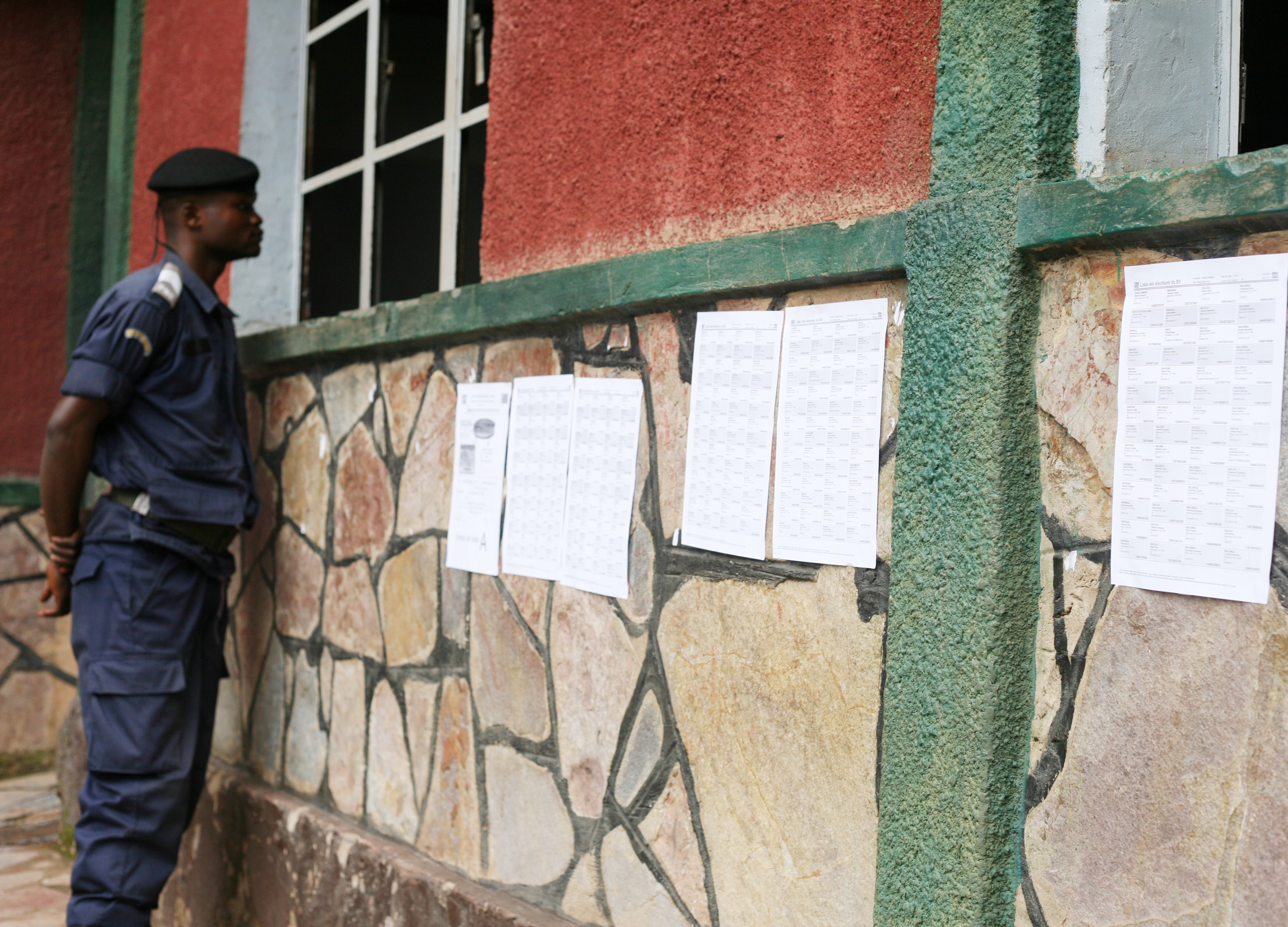
Bipemba

Bipemba is a commune of the city of Mbuji-Mayi in the Democratic Republic of the Congo.
