= Sankuru River =

River in the Democratic Republic of the Congo

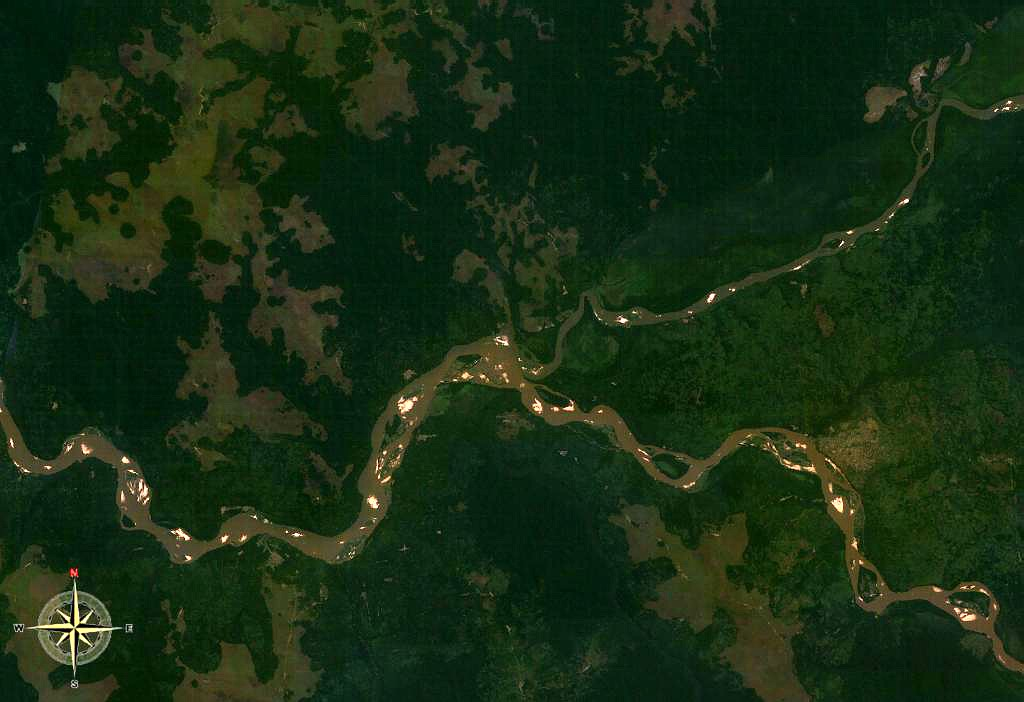
Sankuru River (upper right) entering Kasai River, seen from space

The Sankuru River, in red

The Sankuru River (Swahili: Mto Sankuru) is a major river in the Democratic Republic of the Congo. Its approximate length of 1,200 km makes it the longest tributary of the Kasai River.

Above the confluence with its tributary Mbuji-Mayi it is also known as Lubilash or Lubilanji. It flows northwards and then westwards crossing through a few towns, most notably Lusambo. Then it enters the Kasai River near Bena-Bendi, at 4°17′S 20°25′E.
