= Kasaï-Oriental =

Province of the Democratic Republic of the Congo

Kasaï-Oriental Province du Kasaï Oriental (French)
- Province
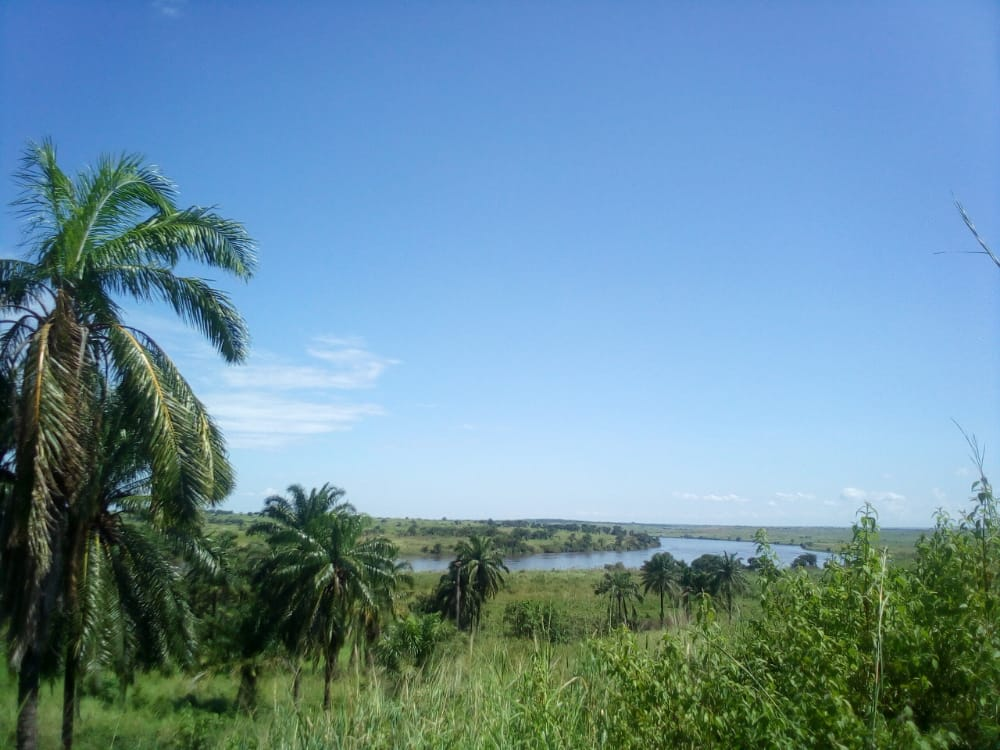
- View of the Sankuru River

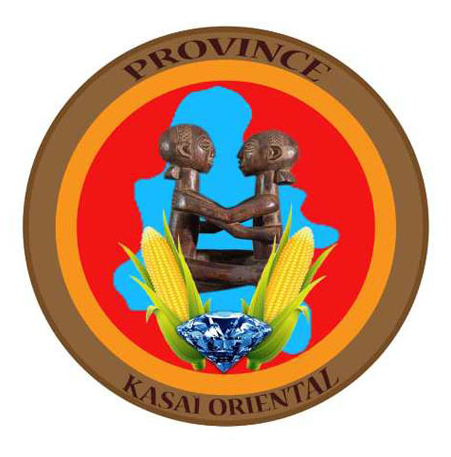
- Seal

- Coordinates: 06°09′S 23°36′E
- Country: Democratic Republic of the Congo
- Established: 2015
- Named for: Kasai River
- Capital: Mbuji-Mayi

Government
  - Governor: Augustin Kayemba (acting)

Area
  - Total: 9,545 km^{2} (3,685 sq mi)
  - Rank: 26th

Population (2020)
  - Total: 3,864,300
  - Rank: 9th
  - Density: 404.9/km^{2} (1,049/sq mi)

Ethnic groups
  - Native: Luba-Kasaï(Baluba) • Basongye
- Time zone: UTC+02:00 (CAT)
- License Plate Code: (Democratic Republic of the Congo) CGO / 09

Kasaï-Oriental (French for "East Kasai") is one of the 21 provinces of the Democratic Republic of the Congo created in the 2015 repartitioning. Kasaï-Oriental, Lomami, and Sankuru provinces are the result of the dismemberment of the former Kasaï-Oriental province. Kasaï-Oriental was formed from the Tshilenge district and the independently administered city of Mbuji-Mayi which retained its status as a provincial capital.

The new province's territory corresponds to most of the historic Sud-Kasaï province which existed in the early period after independence between 1963 and 1966.

== History ==
Kasai-Oriental is inhabited by members of the Luba tribe.

Congo obtained independence from Belgium in 1960. Friction with Congo's other ethnic groups and encouragement by Belgian corporations hoping to keep their mining concessions led to the secession of the province of South Kasai as a separate state headed by Albert Kalonji.

After being repulsed, the Congo occupied the province in September 1961. Several thousand people were killed during the "pacification" of South Kasai, which lasted through the spring of 1962.

The population of Mbuji-Mayi grew rapidly with the immigration of Luba people from other parts of the country.

== Diamond mining ==
The region in which Mbuji-Mayi is situated annually produces one-tenth in weight of the world's industrial diamonds, with mining managed by the Société Minière de Bakwanga. This is the largest accumulation of diamonds in the world, more concentrated than those at Kimberley, South Africa. Mbuji-Mayi handles most of the industrial diamonds produced in the Congo.

== Administration ==
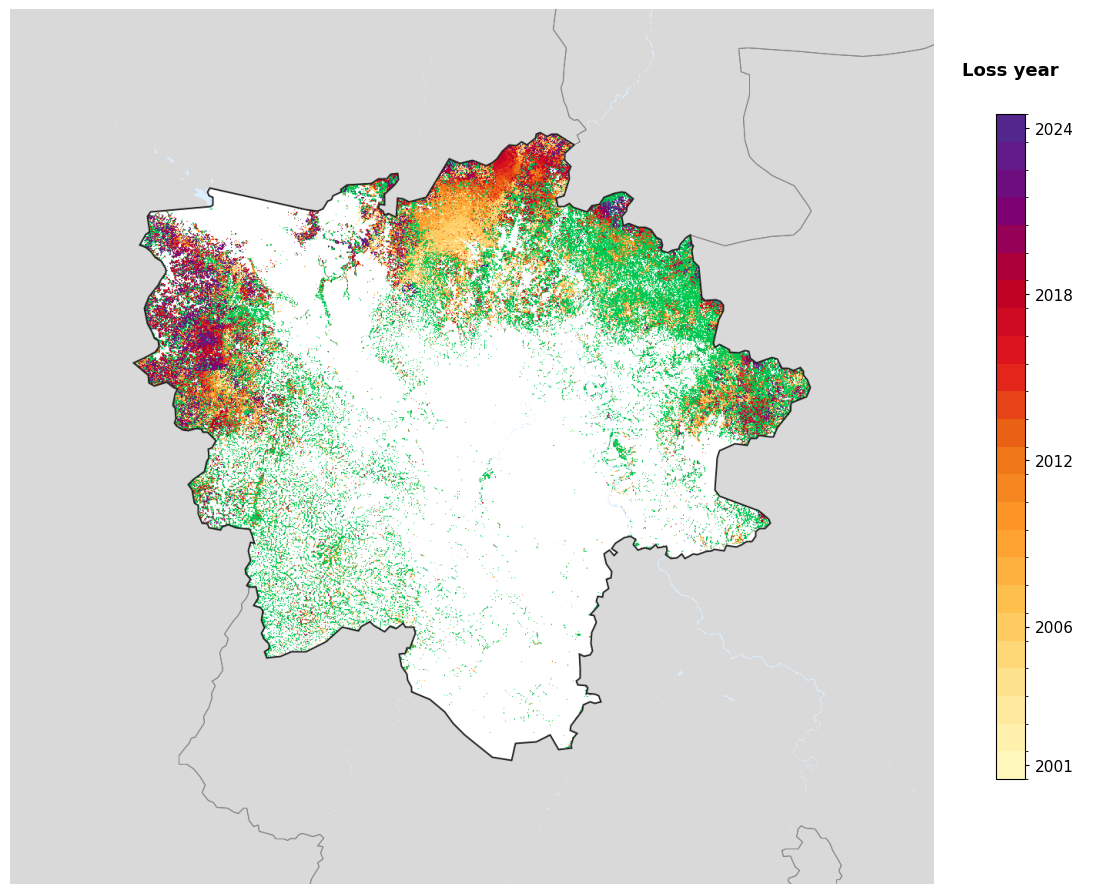
Tree-cover loss year in Kasaï-Oriental, 2001-2024, from the Global Forest Change dataset.

Kasaï-Oriental is divided in to five territories and one independently administered city.

Administrative division	Type	Map
Mbuji-Mayi	City	Mbuji-Mayi
Kabeya-Kamwanga	Territory	Kabeya-Kamwanga
Katanda	Territory	Katanda
Lupatapata	Territory	Lupatapata
Miabi	Territory	Miabi
Tshilenge	Territory	Tshilenge

== Languages ==
French is the official language. Tshiluba is one of the four national languages of the Democratic Republic of the Congo. Tshiluba is spoken by about 6.3 million people in the Kasai-Oriental, Kasai-Occidental and Kasaï-Central provinces.

== See also ==
- Kasai region
- List of governors of Kasaï Oriental Province
