= Bernard Emmanuel Kasanda Mulenga =

Congolese Catholic prelate (born 1954)

The Most Reverend Bernard Emmanuel Kasanda Mulenga
- Bishop of Mbujimayi, Democratic Republic of the Congo
- Church: Catholic Church
- Archdiocese: Roman Catholic Archdiocese of Kananga
- See: Roman Catholic Diocese of Mbujimayi
- Appointed: 1 August 2009
- Installed: 1 August 2009
- Predecessor: Tharcisse Tshibangu Tshishiku
- Successor: Incumbent

Orders
- Ordination: 6 August 1981
- Consecration: 14 June 1998 by Tharcisse Tshibangu Tshishiku
- Rank: Bishop

Personal details
- Born: Bernard Emmanuel Kasanda Mulenga; 25 December 1954 (age 71) Kananga, Kasaï-Central, DR Congo

Styles of Bernard Emmanuel Kasanda Mulenga
- Reference style: Your Lordship; The Most Reverend
- Spoken style: His Lordship
- Religious style: Bishop

Bernard Emmanuel Kasanda Mulenga (born 25 December 1954) is a Congolese Catholic prelate who is the Bishop of the Roman Catholic Diocese of Mbujimayi in the Democratic Republic of the Congo since 1 August 2009. Before that, from 14 February 1998 until 1 August 2009 he was Auxiliary Bishop of the diocese of Mbujimayi. He concurrently served as Titular Bishop of Utimmira, while auxiliary bishop. He served as a priest of the same diocese from 6 August 1981 until 14 February 1998. He was appointed bishop on 14 February 1998 by Pope John Paul II. He was consecrated as bishop at Mbujimayi on 14 June 1998.

== Background and education ==
He was born on 25 December 1954 in Kananga, Kasai-Central, DRC. After elementary and secondary school education in his home country, he studied at the University of Paris VIII Saint Denis, where he graduated with a Doctorate in social and anthropological psychology.

== Priest ==
He was ordained a priest of the Diocese of Mbujimayi on 6 August 1981. He served as a priest until 14 February 1998.

While a priest, he served in various roles including as:

- Vicar of the parishes of Saint Amand and Inabanza in Ngandajika, Diocese of Mbujimayi from 1981 until 1990.
- Rector of the minor seminary of Saint Thomas Aquinas in Lukelenge, Diocese of Mbujimayi from 1981 until 1990.
- President of the Diocesan Commission for Vocations from 1981 until 1990.
- Episcopal vicar in charge of seminaries and vocations from 1981 until 1990.

== Bishop ==
Pope John Paul II appointed him Auxiliary Bishop of Mbujimayi on 14 February 1998. He was contemporaneously appointed Titular Bishop of Utimmira. He was consecrated and installed at Mbujimayi, Democratic Republic of the Congo on 14 June 1998 by the hands of Bishop Tharcisse Tshibangu Tshishiku, Bishop of Mbujimayi assisted by Archbishop Godefroid Mukeng'a Kalond, Archbishop of Kananga and Bishop Valentin Masengo Nkinda, Bishop of Kabinda.

On 1 August 2009, Pope Benedict XVI appointed him Bishop of Mbujimayi. He succeeded Bishop Tharcisse Tshibangu Tshishiku, whose age-related resignation had been accepted by the Holy See and took effect that day.

== See also ==
- Catholic Church in the Democratic Republic of the Congo

== Succession table ==
Catholic Church titles
| Preceded by | Auxiliary Bishop of Mbujimayi (14 February 1998 - 1 August 2009) | Succeeded by |
| Preceded by Tharcisse Tshibangu Tshishiku (26 November 1991 - 1 August 2009) | Bishop of Mbujimayi (since 1 Aug 2009) | Succeeded by Incumbent |
