= Diocese of Mbujimayi =

Roman Catholic diocese in the Democratic Republic of the Congo

Diocese of Mbujimayi Dioecesis Mbugimayensis

Location
- Country: Democratic Republic of the Congo
- Metropolitan: Kananga

Statistics
- Area: 15,285 km^{2} (5,902 sq mi)
- Population: Total; Catholics: (as of 2004); 4,000,000; 2,500,000 (62.5%)

Information
- Rite: Latin Rite
- Cathedral: Saint Jean Baptiste de Bonzola

Current leadership
- Pope: Leo XIV
- Bishop: Bernard Emmanuel Kasanda Mulenga

The Roman Catholic Diocese of Mbujimayi (Latin: Mbugimayen(sis)) is a Latin diocese in the Democratic Republic of the Congo's Kasai Oriental province. It is a suffragan in the ecclesiastical province of Kananga.

Its cathedral episcopal see is the Cathédrale Saint-Jean-Baptiste de Bonzola in the city of Mbuji-Mayi.

== History ==
- Established on 22 November 1963 as Apostolic Administration of Mbuji-Mayi, on territories split off from the Metropolitan Archdiocese of Luluabourg and the Diocese of Kabinda
- 3 May 1966: Promoted as Diocese of Mbujimayi

== Bishops ==
(all Latin Rite)

=== Ordinaries ===
Apostolic administrator

- Joseph Ngogi Nkongolo (1963 - 3 May 1966 see below), previously Titular Bishop of Lebedus & Apostolic Vicar of Luebo (Congo-Kinshasa) (25 April 1959 – 10 November 1959), promoted first Bishop of Luebo (Congo-Kinshasa) (10 November 1959 – 3 May 1966)

Suffragan Bishops of Mbujimayi

- Joseph Ngogi Nkongolo (see above 3 May 1966 – 26 November 1991)
- Tharcisse Tshibangu Tshishiku (26 November 1991 – 1 August 2009), previously Titular Bishop of Scampa & Auxiliary Bishop of Kinshasa (Congo-Kinshasa) (1 September 1970 – 26 November 1991)
- Bernard Emmanuel Kasanda Mulenga (since 1 August 2009), previously Titular Bishop of Utimmira (14 February 1998 – 1 August 2009) and Auxiliary Bishop of Mbujimayi (14 February 1998 – 1 August 2009)

=== Auxiliary bishop ===
- Bernard Emmanuel Kasanda Mulenga (1999–2009), appointed Bishop here

== See also ==
- Roman Catholicism in the Democratic Republic of the Congo

== Sources and external links ==
- GCatholic.org, with incumbent biography links
- Catholic Hierarchy
