= Emery Kibal Nkufi Mansong'loo =

Congolese Catholic prelate (born in 1969)

The Most Reverend Emery Kibal Nkufi Mansong'loo
- Bishop of Kole, Democratic Republic of the Congo
- Church: Catholic Church
- Archdiocese: Roman Catholic Archdiocese of Kananga
- See: Roman Catholic Diocese of Kole
- Appointed: 6 May 2015
- Installed: 9 August 2015
- Predecessor: Stanislas Lukumwena Lumbala
- Successor: Incumbent

Orders
- Ordination: 2 August 1998
- Consecration: 9 August 2015 by Cardinal Laurent Monsengwo Pasinya
- Rank: Bishop

Personal details
- Born: Emery Kibal Nkufi Mansong'loo; 28 June 1968 (age 57) Kimputu, Kwilu Province, Democratic Republic of the Congo

Styles of Emery Kibal Nkufi Mansong'loo
- Reference style: Your Lordship; The Most Reverend
- Spoken style: His Lordship
- Religious style: Archbishop

Emery Kibal Nkufi Mansong'loo C.P. (born 28 June 1969) is a Congolese Catholic prelate who serves as Bishop of the Roman Catholic Diocese of Kole, in the Democratic Republic of the Congo, since 6 May 2015. Before that, from 2 August 1998 until he was appointed bishop, he was a priest of the Roman Catholic Order of the Congregation of the Passion of Jesus Christ. He was appointed bishop on 6 May 2015 by Pope Francis. He was consecrated and installed at Kole, on 9 August 2015. From 6 March 2018 until 21 July 2019, while bishop, he concurrently served as Apostolic Administrator of the Roman Catholic Diocese of Bokungu-Ikela in the DR Congo.

== Background and education ==
He was born on 28 June 1969 at Kimputu, Diocese of Idiofa, Kwilu Province, DR Congo. He attended primary school and secondary school in his home area. He became a member of the Order of the Congregation of the Passionist Fathers, in Kinshasa in 1988. He studied Philosophy at the Saint Augustin Institute in Kinshasa from 1988 until 1991. He then studied Theology at Tangaza University College (a component of the Catholic University of Eastern Africa), in Nairobi, Kenya from 1992 until 1997. From 2005 until 2013 he studied at the Pontifical Athenaeum of Saint Anselm in Rome, Italy where he graduated with a Licentiate in Liturgy.

== Priest ==
He took his perpetual vows as member of the Order of the Congregation of the Passion of Jesus Christ on 31 July 1998. He was ordained a priest of the same religious Order on 2 August 1998. He served as priest until 6 May 2015.

While a priest, he served in various roles and locations including as:

- Assistant priest of the Holy Family of Ototo, in the Diocese of Tshumbe, Archdiocese of Kananga from 1998 until 1999.
- Pastor of the Catholic Mission of Lumbi, Diocese of Kikwit, Archdiocese of Kinshasa from 1999 until 2002.
- Provincial Superior of the Passionists, for two successive mandates from 2005 until 2013.
- Professor of Liturgy at the Saint Augustin University, Kinshasa from 2005 until 2013.
- Professor of Liturgy at the Saint Eugene de Maznod Institute, Kinshasa from 2005 until 2013.
- Professor of Liturgy at the Inter-novitiate of women's Congregations from 2005 until 2013.
- President of ASUMA from 2008 until 2013.
- Member of the Board of Directors of the Catholic University of Congo from 2011 until 2013.

== As bishop ==
On 6 May 2015, Pope Francis appointed him as bishop of the Roman Catholic Diocese of Kole, DRC. He was consecrated and installed at Kole, on 9 August 2015 by the hands of Cardinal Laurent Monsengwo Pasinya, Archbishop of Kinshasa assisted by Archbishop Marcel Madila Basanguka, Archbishop of Kananga and Bishop Fridolin Ambongo Besungu, Bishop of Bokungu-Ikela.

While bishop, from 6 March 2018, he served as apostolic administrator of the Roman Catholic Diocese of Bokungu-Ikela in the DRC. That administratorship ceases on 21 July 2019.

== See also ==
- Catholic Church in the Democratic Republic of the Congo

== Succession table ==
Catholic Church titles
Preceded by Stanislas Lukumwena Lumbala (14 February 1998 - 30 October 2008)	Bishop of Kole (since 6 May 2015)	Succeeded by Incumbent
