= Sebastien Kenda Ntumba =

Congolese Catholic prelate (born in 1960)

The Most Reverend Sebastien Kenda Ntumba
- Bishop of Tshilomba, Democratic Republic of the Congo
- Church: Catholic Church
- Archdiocese: Roman Catholic Archdiocese of Kananga
- See: Roman Catholic Diocese of Tshilomba
- Appointed: 22 March 2022
- Installed: 5 June 2022
- Predecessor: Diocese created
- Successor: Incumbent

Orders
- Ordination: 9 August 1987
- Consecration: 5 June 2022 by Ettore Balestrero
- Rank: Bishop

Personal details
- Born: Sebastien Kenda Ntumba; 11 June 1960 (age 65); Tshiona, Diocese of Luiza, Kasaï-Central, Democratic Republic of the Congo

Styles of Sebastien Kenda Ntumba
- Reference style: Your Lordship; The Most Reverend
- Spoken style: His Lordship
- Religious style: Archbishop

Sebastien Kenda Ntumba (born 11 June 1960) is a Congolese Catholic prelate who has served as Bishop of the Roman Catholic Diocese of Tshilomba in the Democratic Republic of the Congo since June 2022. From 9 August 1987 until then he was a priest of the Roman Catholic Diocese of Luiza.

== Background and education ==
He was born on 11 June 1960 in Tshiona, Diocese of Luiza, Kasaï-Central, in the DR Congo. He studied at the Kamponde Minor Seminary, graduating with a diploma in Literary Humanities in 1980. He then entered the Saint François Xavier Major Seminary in Mbuji-Mayi, where he studied philosophy from 1980 to 1983. He then earned a Bachelor's degree in theology from the Pontifical Urban University in Rome and, graduated from the Pontifical Theological Faculty of Sicily in Palermo, with a licentiate in theology.

== Priest ==
He was ordained a priest for the Diocese of Luiza on 8 August 1987. He was: formator at the Kamponde Minor Seminary from 1987 until 1990; parish priest of Saint Jean in Yangala and Sainte Marie Alacoque in Winkon; dean and head of the diocesan office for pastoral ministry from 1990 until 2003; Fidei donum priest in the Diocese of Agrigento (Italy) from 2003 until 2016; administrator of the parish of the Transfiguration in the Villaggio Giordano in Palma di Montechiaro from 2003 to 2012; vicar forane from 2008 to 2012; administrator of the parish of Maria Santissima della Catena in Italy from 2012 to 2013; administrator of the parish of San Nicola alle Fontanelle in Agrigento from 2014 to 2016; a lecturer in the diocesan seminary of Agrigento from 2016 to 2017; and priest of Saint Anthony of Padua in Kalomba (Democratic Congo) from 2017 to 2022.

== Bishop ==
On 25 March 2022, Pope Francis created the Roman Catholic Diocese of Tshilomba (DRC) and appointed Ntumba its first bishop. He was consecrated and installed at Tshilomba on 5 June 2022 by Ettore Balestrero, Apostolic Nuncio to the DRC, assisted by Archbishop Marcel Madila Basanguka, Archbishop of Kananga, and Félicien Mwanama Galumbulula, Bishop of Luiza.

== See also ==
- Catholic Church in the Democratic Republic of the Congo

Catholic Church titles
Diocese created	Bishop of Tshilomba (25 March 2022 – present)	Incumbent
