= 2025 Kasaï Province Ebola outbreak =

Disease outbreak in Democratic Republic of the Congo

- Disease: Ebola
- Pathogen: Zaire ebolavirus
- Location: Democratic Republic of the Congo
- Date: 20 August 2025 – 1 December 2025
- Confirmed cases: 81
- Deaths: 28

An outbreak of the Zaire ebolavirus (EBOV) was declared in Kasai Province in the Democratic Republic of Congo by the country's Ministry of Public Health on 4 September 2025. At least 81 confirmed cases were recorded, while at least 28 people died. On December 1, the Congolese government declared the end of the outbreak.

== Background ==
Since Ebola was first identified in 1976 the Democratic Republic of the Congo (or Zaire) has had 14 other outbreaks of Zaire ebolavirus (EBOV), and also had one outbreak of another Ebola variant of Bundibugyo virus disease (BDBV). Kasai Province has had two of these outbreaks.

Date	Virus	Human cases	Human deaths	CFR	Description
Aug–Nov 2007	EBOV	264	187	71%	Outbreak was declared in September in Luebo and Mweka health zones of the Kasaï-Occidental province.
Dec 2008–Feb 2009	EBOV	32	14	45%	Occurred in the Mweka and Luebo health zones of the Kasaï-Occidental province.

== Epidemiology ==
As of 14 September 2025, a total of 81 confirmed cases had been identified.

=== Timeline ===
On 20 August, the first known index case of the outbreak, a 34-year old pregnant woman who was a resident of Bulape in the Bulape health zone was admitted to Bulape General Reference Hospital and died of multiple organ failure on 25 August.

By 4 September when the outbreak was declared, 28 cases and 15 deaths (confirmed, probable or suspected) had been identified of which 14 deaths were in Bulape and one death was in Mweka. The death toll included four medical workers including nurses and lab technicians.

By 6 September 31 cases and 14 deaths (confirmed, probable or suspected) had been identified in Bulape health zone, and one case and one death (confirmed, probable or suspected) in Mweka heath zone. On September 7 the head of the Mweka health zone Dr. Amitié Bukidi said all 4 health zones (Bulape, Mweka, Kakenge and Mushenge) of Mweka Territory had received suspected cases, while the chief medical officer of the Bulape health zone Dr. Jean Paul Mikobi said many had fled their villages which had affected tracing and monitoring. By 10 September cases had risen to 42 with 15 deaths (confirmed, probable or suspected).

==== Spread outside Mweka Territory ====
By 12 September the four health zones of Bulape, Mweka and Mushenge in Mweka Territory, and Dekese in Dekese Territory had officially registered cases with a combined total of 68 cases and 16 deaths (confirmed, probable or suspected) as reported to the Africa Centres for Disease Control and Prevention. This marked the first official spread of the disease outside of Mweka Territory.

On 14 September the DRC health authorities announced that 81 confirmed cases and 28 deaths had been recorded. The WHO put the number of confirmed cases at 38 as of 18 September, of which 31 had died. On 21 September, the number of confirmed cases rose to 47, of which 35 had died. On 5 October, the number of cases reached 53, of which 32 had died. It also noted no new cases in the preceding 10 days. The last known patient was discharged on 19 October, by which time there were 53 confirmed cases, of which 43 had died.

Province	Cases	Deaths	Last update
Kasai	81 Confirmed	28 Confirmed	14 September 2025
Total	81 Confirmed	28 Confirmed	14 September 2025

== Response ==
The DRC health ministry informed the World Health Organization of suspected Ebola cases on 1 September. The DRC health ministry then declared an outbreak of Zaire ebolavirus (EBOV) on 4 September after the first samples were taken and confirmed by the National Institute of Biomedical Research in the capital Kinshasa. A Rapid Response Team of the health authorities in the DRC were joined by World Health Organization (WHO) experts and deployed to Kasai Province by that same day. The WHO ordered the release of 2,000 doses of Ebola vaccines that had been placed on standby in Kinshasa to vaccinate contacts and health workers.

On 5 September, authorities in Mweka Territory imposed a suspension of classes and graduation ceremonies and the closure of weekly markets. On 8 September the provincial governor announced Bulape health zone had been put under confinement with checkpoints erected to restrict movement in and out. The first Ebola treatment center was set up by the DRC health ministry, with support from WHO and Doctors Without Borders (MSF), in the compound of Bulape General Reference Hospital with the first patients admitted and mAb114 administered on September 9. A UN peacekeeping helicopter delivered Ebola vaccines to Bulape on 12 September. The first shipment of the 400 doses of Ebola vaccines were handed out to those most at risk in Bulape on 14 September.

== Transmission and virology ==
Ebola is mainly spread through contact with bodily fluids. The average case fatality rate of Ebola (all 4 viruses) is 50%.

The results from whole genome sequencing from the first confirmed cases of the outbreak suggested that this outbreak was a new zoonotic spillover event and not linked to the past Ebola outbreaks in Kasai province, or other outbreaks elsewhere.
