= Mweka =

Mweka may refer to the following African places and jurisdictions :

- Mweka Territory, Democratic Republic of the Congo
  - Mweka, the town that is the seat of the above territory
    - the Roman Catholic Diocese of Mweka, with seat in the above town
- Mweka, Tanzania, location of the College of African Wildlife Management
