= Eustache Ntambwe Makoyo =

Congolese Catholic prelate (born 1974)

The Most Reverend Eustache Ntambwe Makoyo
- Bishop of Kabinda, Democratic Republic of the Congo
- Church: Catholic Church
- Archdiocese: Roman Catholic Archdiocese of Kananga
- See: Diocese of Kabinda
- Appointed: 29 July 2026
- Installed: 11 October 2026
- Predecessor: Félicien Ntambue Kasembe, C.I.C.M. (23 July 2020 - 19 March 2024)
- Successor: Incumbent

Orders
- Ordination: 28 August 2005
- Consecration: 11 October 2026 by Félicien Ntambue Kasembe

Personal details
- Born: Eustache Ntambwe Makoyo; 14 February 1974 (age 52) Musoshi, Diocese of Kabinda, Lomami Province, Democratic Republic of the Congo
- Motto: "Adiutorium nostrum in nomine Domini" ("Our help is in the name of the Lord").

Styles of Eustache Ntambwe Makoyo
- Reference style: His Grace; The Most Reverend
- Spoken style: Your Grace
- Religious style: Bishop

Eustache Ntambwe Makoyo (born 14 February 1974) is a Congolese Catholic prelate who was appointed bishop of the Roman Catholic Diocese of Kabinda, in the Democratic Republic of the Congo on 29 July 2026. Before that, from 28 Aug 2005 until he was appointed bishop, he served as a priest for the same Roman Catholic diocese. He was appointed bishop by Pope Leo XIV. He received his episcopal consecration on 11 October 2026.

== Background and education ==
He was born on 14 February 1974 at Musoshi, Democratic Republic of the Congo. He studied philosophy at the Saint Paul VI Seminary of Kabinda. He then studied theology at the Christ the King Seminary in Kananga. He graduated from the Pontifical Institute of Sacred Music in Rome, Italy with a Bachelor's degree in musicology in 2019. The Pontifical Institute of Liturgy of Saint Anselm in Rome awarded him a licentiate in vocal pedagogy and a Master's degree in liturgical music, both in 2021. In 2025, he graduated from the University of Rome Tor Vergata, with a Doctorate in music and performing arts, specializing in ethnomusicology.

== Priest ==
He was ordained a priest on 28 August 2005, for the Diocese of Kabinda. He served as a priest until 29 July 2026. While a priest, he served in various roles and locations including:

- Vice rector of the Saint Charles Borromée Preparatory Seminary in Kabinda from 2005 until 2006.
- Spiritual director of the Saint Pius X Minor Seminary from 2006 until 2011.
- President of the diocesan commission for the liturgy from 2006 until 2011.
- Studies at the Pontifical Institute of Sacred Music in Rome, leading to the award of a bachelor's degree in musicology from 2012 until 2019.
- Studies at the Pontifical Institute of Liturgy of Saint Anselm in Rome leading to the award of a licentiate in vocal pedagogy and a master's degree in liturgical music, both in 2021.
- Studies at the University of Rome Tor Vergata in Rome, Italy leading to the award of a doctorate in music and performing arts, specializing in ethnomusicology in 2025.
- Pastoral assistant at the Tre Arcangeli Pastoral Community in Livorno, Italy from 2021 until 2025.
- Rector of the Saint Charles Borromée Preparatory Seminary in Kabinda from 2025 until 2026.

== Bishop ==
On 29 July 2026, Pope Leo XIV appointed him bishop and posted him at Kabinda as the local ordinary. He succeeded Félicien Ntambue Kasembe who was transferred to the Archdiocese of Kananga and appointed Archbishop there in March 2024. The episcopal consecration of Bishop Eustache Ntamwe Makoyo took place on 11 October 2026. The Principal Consecrator was Félicien Ntambue Kasembe, Archishop of Kananga Archdiocese.

== See also ==
- Roman Catholicism in the Democratic Republic of the Congo

== Succession table ==
Catholic Church titles
Preceded by Félicien Ntambue Kasembe, C.I.C.M. (23 July 2020 - 19 March 2024)	Bishop of Kabinda (since 29 July 2026)	Succeeded by (Incumbent)
