= Oscar Nkolo Kanowa =

Congolese Catholic prelate (born 1957)

The Most Reverend Oscar Nkolo Kanowa
- Bishop of Mweka, Democratic Republic of the Congo
- Church: Catholic Church
- Archdiocese: Roman Catholic Archdiocese of Kananga
- See: Roman Catholic Diocese of Mweka
- Appointed: 18 February 2017
- Installed: 28 May 2017
- Predecessor: Gérard Mulumba Kalemba
- Successor: Incumbent

Orders
- Ordination: 19 July 1987
- Consecration: 28 May 2017 by Cardinal Laurent Monsengwo Pasinya
- Rank: Bishop

Personal details
- Born: Oscar Nkolo Kanowa; 8 September 1957 (age 68) Mbuji-Mayi, Kasaï-Oriental, DR Congo

Styles of Oscar Nkolo Kanowa
- Reference style: Your Lordship; The Most Reverend
- Spoken style: His Lordship
- Religious style: Bishop

Oscar Nkolo Kanowa C.I.C.M. (born 8 September 1957) is a Congolese Catholic prelate who is the Bishop of the Roman Catholic Diocese of Mweka in the Democratic Republic of the Congo since 18 February 2017. Before that, from 19 July 1987 until he was appointed bishop, he was a priest of the Order of Congregation of the Immaculate Heart of Mary. He was appointed bishop on 18 February 2017 by Pope Francis. He was consecrated as bishop on 28 May 2017.

== Background and education ==
He was born on 8 September 1957 in Mbuji-Mayi, Kasai-Oriental, DRC. He attended elementary school in Kamilabi-Kananga. He then studied at the Minor Seminary in Kabwe, for his secondary school education. He studied Philosophy at the Interdiocesan Major Seminary of Kasai-Kabwe. He entered the novitiate of the CICM Missionaries in Mbudi, Kinshasa in 1981. From 1998 until 1999 he studied as formator at the Saint Louis University in the United States.

== Priest ==
He professed as a member of the Order of Congregation of the Immaculate Heart of Mary (CICM) in September 1982. He took his perpetual vows as a member of that Order in September 1986. He was ordained a priest of the same religious Order on 19 July 1987. He served as a priest until 18 February 2017.

While a priest, he served in various roles including as:

- Vicar and parish priest, in the Dominican Province of the CICM Missionaries from 1988 until 1995.
- Bursar of the Dominican Province of the CICM Missionaries from 1988 until 1995.
- Vice provincial of the Dominican Republic from 1995 until 1997.
- Rector of the pre-novitiate in the Dominican Republic from 1996 until 1998.
- Rector of the Scholasticate in Kinshasa from 1999 until 2000.
- Member of the provincial governance from 2001 until 2003.
- Adjunct prosecutor for the province from 2001 until 2003.
- Provincial superior of Kasayi and Southern Africa from 2004 until 2012.
- Bursar of the International Novitiate of Mbudi in Kinshasa from 2014 until 2017.

== Bishop ==
On 18 February 2017, Pope Francis accepted the resignation from the pastoral care of the Diocese of Mweka in the Democratic Republic of Congo, presented by Bishop Gérard Mulumba Kalemba. The Holy Father appointed Reverent Father Oscar Nkolo Kanowa, C.I.C.M. as the new Local Ordinary of the diocese of Mweka. He was consecrated and installed at Mweka on 28 May 2017 by the hands of Cardinal Laurent Monsengwo Pasinya, Archbishop of Kinshasa assisted by Archbishop Marcel Madila Basanguka, Archbishop of Kananga and Bishop Cyprien Mbuka Di Nkuanga, Bishop of Boma. He continues to serve as the bishop of Mweka Diocese as of 2022.

== See also ==
- Catholic Church in the Democratic Republic of the Congo

== Succession table ==
Catholic Church titles
Preceded by Gérard Mulumba Kalemba (19 January 1989 - 18 Feb 2017)	Bishop of Mweka (since 18 February 2017)	Succeeded by Incumbent
