= Bena Makima =

- Location in the Democratic Republic of the Congo
- Coordinates: 4.971415°S 21.10038°E
- Country: DR Congo
- Province: Kasai
- Territory: Mweka
- Time zone: UTC+02:00 (Central Africa Time)

Bena Makima is a community in the Democratic Republic of the Congo. It is on the right bank of the Kasai River, a few kilometers downstream from the point where the Lulua River enters the Kasai. It is at the highest navigable point on the Kasai in the dry season.

Bena Makima was situated within the territory of the Kuba Kingdom. It was a post of the Compagnie du Kasai (CK). The post was a trading center, one of the locations to which the Zappo Zaps brought their ivory and rubber. Early in the 1900s a residence of the Catholic Prefecture Apostolic of Upper Kassai was established at Bena Makima. The Presbyterian missionaries led by William Morrison had asked to be allowed to establish a mission there, but were refused.

The company began a rubber plantation at Bena Makima in October 1904. In a unique arrangement, four missionaries of the order of Scheut fathers took charge of planting rubber and of gathering wild rubber in exchange for having their goods transported at no charge on the steamer from Kinshasa to Luebo. The missionaries ran the plantation using bonded Luba laborers, former slaves from eastern and central Kasai who had recently been liberated. On 5 November 1904 the post was attacked by the Kuba. The Europeans managed to drive off the attackers with the help of their foreign workers, and were relieved on 9 November by soldiers of the Force Publique led by De Cock and Hubin, who arrived from the east.

With construction of the railway Bena Makima lost its importance as a transshipment point in the dry season, and after 1928 became less and less important.

== Sources ==
- Benedetto, Robert (1996). Presbyterian reformers in Central Africa: a documentary account of the American Presbyterian Congo Mission and the human rights struggle in the Congo, 1890-1918. BRILL. ISBN 90-04-10239-6.
- This article incorporates text from a publication now in the public domain: Herbermann, Charles, ed. (1913). "Prefecture Apostolic of Upper Kassai". Catholic Encyclopedia. New York: Robert Appleton Company.
- Kwete Mwana, Georges; Vansina, Jan (2010). Souvenirs d'un prince Kuba du Congo (1913-1970). Editions L'Harmattan. ISBN 978-2-296-09653-0.
- Marchal, Jules; Delathuy, A. M. (1996). E.D. Morel contre Léopold II. Editions L'Harmattan. ISBN 2-7384-2856-8.
- Vansina, Jan (2010). Being colonized: the Kuba experience in rural Congo, 1880-1960. Univ of Wisconsin Press. ISBN 978-0-299-23644-1.
