= Marcel Madila Basanguka =

Congolesse Catholic prelate (born 1955)

The Most Reverend Marcel Madila Basanguka
- Archbishop Emeritus of Kananga, Democratic Republic of the Congo
- Church: Catholic Church
- Archdiocese: Archdiocese of Kananga
- See: Kananga
- Appointed: 9 December 2006
- Installed: 9 December 2006
- Term ended: 21 December 2022
- Predecessor: Godefroid Mukeng'a Kalond (3 March 1997 - 3 May 2006)
- Successor: Félicien Ntambue Kasembe (since 19 March 2024)
- Other post: Auxiliary Bishop of Kananga (27 February 2004 - 9 December 2006)

Orders
- Ordination: 30 August 2081 by Martin-Léonard Bakole wa Ilunga
- Consecration: 29 May 2004 by Arhbishop Godefroid Mukeng'a Kalond
- Rank: Archbishop

Personal details
- Born: Marcel Madila Basanguka; 17 May 1955 (age 71) Demba, Archdiocese of Kananga, DR Congo
- Motto: "Spes unica" (The only hope)

Styles of Marcel Madila Basanguka
- Reference style: Your Lordship; The Most Reverend
- Spoken style: His Lordship
- Religious style: Bishop

Marcel Madila Basanguka (born 17 May 1955) is a Congolese Roman Catholic prelate who served as the Archbishop of Roman Catholic Archdiocese of Kananga, in the Democratic Republic of the Congo, from 9 December 2006 until his resignation on 21 December 2022. Before that, from 27 February 2004 until 9 December 2006, he served as Auxiliary Bishop of the same Catholic archdiocese. While auxiliary bishop, he concurrently served as Titular Bishop of Gigthi. He was appointed bishop by Pope John Paul II. His episcopal consecration took place on 29 May 2004. The Principal Consecrator was Godefroid Mukeng'a Kalond, Archbishop of Kananga, his predecessor at the helm of that Metropolitan Ecclesiastical Province. On 21 December 2022, Pope Francis accepted the resignation from the pastoral care of the Archdiocese of Kananga presented by Archbishop Marcel Madila Basanguka. He lives on as Archbishop Emeritus of Kananga, in the DRC.

== Background and education ==
He was born on 17 May 1955 at Demba, Archdiocese of Kananga, Kasaï-Central, Democratic Republic of the Congo. He attended the Kabwe Minor Seminary in Kabwe, Zambia. He studied philosophy at Mbujimayi Major Seminary in Mbuji Mayi, DR Congo. He then studied theology at the Malole Major Seminary (Grand Séminaire de Malole) in Kananga. He graduated from the Catholic Faculty Kinshasa (now Catholic University of the Congo) with a degree in Theology. He also holds a Doctorate in philosophy from the Catholic University of Paris jointly awarded in History of Religions and Religious Anthropology with the University of Paris-Sorbonne.

== Priest ==
He was ordained a priest on 30 August 1981 at Kananga by Archbishop Martin-Léonard Bakole wa Ilunga, Archbishop of Kananga. He served in that capacity until 27 February 2004. While a priest, he served in various roles and locations, including:

- "Vicaire routier" at M.C. Mikalayi Saint Joseph from 1981 until 1984.
- Professor at the Mbujimayi Major Seminary from 1984 until 1986.
- Studies in Paris, France, leading to the award of a joint doctorate degree from the Catholic University of Paris and the University of Paris-Sorbonne from 1987 until 1996.
- Professor of philosophy at Kabwe Major Seminary from 1996 until 1999.
- "Clergy animator" at the Kabwe Major Seminary from 1996 until 1999.
- Rector of the John Paul II Seminary University in Kinshasa from 2000 until 2004.
- Professor at the Catholic University of the Congo from 2000 until 2004.

== Bishop ==
On 27 February 2004, Pope John Paul II appointed the Right Revedrend Monsigor Marcel Madila Basanguka, previously a member of the clergy of the same Catholic see as Auxiliary Bishop of Kananga, DR Congo. He was simultaneously assigned Titular Bishop of Gigthi. He received his episcopal consecration on 29 May 2004 at Kananga. The Principal Consecrator was Godefroid Mukeng'a Kalond, Archbishop of Kananga who was assisted by Gérard Mulumba Kalemba, Bishop of Mweka and Giovanni d'Aniello, Titular Archbishop of Pesto.

On 9 December 2006, Pope Benedict XVI appointed him archbishop of the Metroplotitan Ecclesiastical Province of Kananga. He succeeded Archbishop Godefroid Mukeng'a Kalond, who was archbishop here until his age-related reirement on 3 May 2006. On 21 December 2022, Pope Francis accepted the resignation from the pastoral care of the Archdiocese of Kananga, presented by Archbishop Marcel Madila Basanguka, who lives on as Archbishop Emeritus of Kananga, DR Congo.

== See also ==
- Catholic Church in the Democratic Republic of the Congo

== Succession table ==
Catholic Church titles
Preceded by Godefroid Mukeng'a Kalond (3 March 1997 - 3 May 2006)	Archbishop of Kananga (9 December 2006 - 21 December 2022)	Succeeded by Félicien Ntambue Kasembe (since 19 Mar 2024)
Preceded by	Auxiliary Bishop of Kananga (27 February 2004 - 9 December 2006)	Succeeded by
