= Pierre-Célestin Tshitoko Mamba =

Congolese Catholic prelate (born 1956)

The Most Reverend Pierre-Célestin Tshitoko Mamba
- Bishop of Luebo, Democratic Republic of the Congo
- Church: Catholic Church
- Archdiocese: Roman Catholic Archdiocese of Kananga
- See: Roman Catholic Diocese of Luebo
- Appointed: 7 January 2006
- Installed: 25 March 2006
- Predecessor: Emery Kabongo Kanundowi
- Successor: Incumbent

Orders
- Ordination: 22 August 1982
- Consecration: 25 March 2006 by Godefroid Mukeng'a Kalond
- Rank: Bishop

Personal details
- Born: Pierre-Célestin Tshitoko Mamba; 23 February 1956 (age 70) Kolwezi, Lualaba Province, Democratic Republic of the Congo
- Motto: "Ut Unum Sint" (May all be one)

Styles of Pierre-Célestin Tshitoko Mamba
- Reference style: Your Lordship; The Most Reverend
- Spoken style: His Lordship
- Religious style: Bishop

Pierre-Célestin Tshitoko Mamba (born 23 February 1956) is a Congolese Catholic prelate who is the Bishop of the Roman Catholic Diocese of Luebo in the Democratic Republic of the Congo since 7 January 2006. Before that, from 22 August 1982 until he was appointed bishop, he was a priest of the Roman Catholic Archdiocese of Kananga. He was appointed bishop on 7 January 2006 by Pope Benedict XVI. He was consecrated as bishop on 25 March 2006.

== Background and education ==
He was born on 23 February 1956 in Kolwezi, Lualaba Province, Democratic Congo. He attended Saint Thérèse School in Nganza Parish, in the Archdiocese of Kananga, for his elementary school education. He then transferred to Kabwe Minor Seminary for his secondary school education. He studied philosophy at the Philosophy Seminary of Kabwe and Mbujimayi. He then studied theology at Inter-diocesan Seminary at Malole. He graduated with a Licentiate in Biblical Theology from the Catholic Faculty in Kinshasa in 1985. He holds a Doctorate in biblical theology from the Pontifical Urban University in Rome, Italy, where he studied from 1988 until 1993.

== Priest ==
On 22 August 1982, he was ordained a priest of the Roman Catholic Archdiocese of Kananga. He served as priest until 7 January 2006.

While a priest, he served in various roles including:

- Studies for an advanced degree in biblical theology at the Catholic Faculty Kinshasa from 1982 until 1985.
- Professor at the Inter-diocesan major Seminary, Malole, Archdiocese of Kananga from 1985 until 1988.
- Studies in Rome for a Doctorate in biblical theology at the Pontifical Urban University from 1988 until 1993.
- Secretary to the archbishop of Kananga from 1993 until 1994.
- Rector of the Inter-diocesan Philosophy Seminary at Kabwe, archdiocese of Kananga from 1994 until 2006.

== Bishop ==
Pope Benedict XVI appointed him Bishop of the Roman Catholic Diocese of Luebo on 7 January 2006. He was consecrated and installed at Luebo on 25 March 2006 by the hands of Archbishop Godefroid Mukeng'a Kalond, Archbishop of Kananga assisted by Bishop Valentin Masengo Nkinda, Bishop of Kabinda and Bishop Gérard Mulumba Kalemba, Bishop of Mweka.

== See also ==
- Catholic Church in the Democratic Republic of the Congo

== Succession table ==
Catholic Church titles
Preceded by Emery Kabongo Kanundowi (10 December 1987 - 14 August 2003)	Bishop of Luebo (since 7 January 2006)	Succeeded by Incumbent
