= Tharcisse Tshibangu Tshishiku =

Congolese Catholic prelate (born 1933)

The Most Reverend Tharcisse Tshibangu Tshishiku
- Bishop Emeritus of Mbujimayi, Democratic Republic of the Congo (Deceased)
- Church: Catholic Church
- Archdiocese: Roman Catholic Archdiocese of Kananga
- See: Roman Catholic Diocese of Mbujimayi
- Appointed: 26 November 1991
- Installed: 26 November 1991
- Term ended: 1 August 2009
- Predecessor: Joseph Ngogi Nkongolo
- Successor: Bernard Emmanuel Kasanda Mulenga
- Other post: Auxiliary Bishop of Archdiocese of Kinshasa (1 September 1970 – 26 November 1991)

Orders
- Ordination: 9 August 1959 by Bishop Joseph-Floribert Cornelis
- Consecration: 6 December 1970 by Cardinal Joseph-Albert Malula
- Rank: Bishop

Personal details
- Born: Tharcisse Tshibangu Tshishiku; April 23, 1933 Kipushi, Archdiocese of Lubumbashi, Katanga Province, Democratic Republic of the Congo
- Died: 29 December 2021 (aged 88)

Styles of Tharcisse Tshibangu Tshishiku
- Reference style: Your Lordship; The Most Reverend
- Spoken style: His Lordship
- Religious style: Bishop

Tharcisse Tshibangu Tshishiku (23 April 1933 – 29 December 2021) was a Congolese Catholic prelate who was the bishop of the Roman Catholic Diocese of Mbujimayi in the Democratic Republic of the Congo from 26 November 1991 until his age-related retirement on 1 August 2009. Before that, from 1 September 1970 until 26 November 1991, he was auxiliary bishop of the Roman Catholic Archdiocese of Kinshasa. He was concurrently appointed Titular Bishop of Scampa. He was consecrated and installed at Kinshasa, Democratic Republic of the Congo on 6 December 1970 at the age of 37. On 26 November 1991 Pope John Paul II transferred him to the Roman Catholic Diocese of Mbujimayi and appointed him Local Ordinary there. His retirement request was accepted by Pope Francis and took effect on 1 Aug 2009. Bishop Tharcisse Tshibangu Tshishiku died on Wednesday, 29 December 2021 at the University Clinics of Kinshasa at the age 88.

== Background and education ==
Tharcisse Tshibangu Tshishiku was born in Kipushi, in the Katanga Province, in the Democratic Republic of Congo, on 24 April 1933. He attended primary school in Kipushi in the Sainte Barbe Parsh, from 1939 until 1944. He attended the Benedictine Fathers' Minor Seminary at Kapiri-Kakanda from 1945 until 1951, where he studied "Greco-Latin humanities" and completed secondary school studies. He then transferred to the Baudouinville Major Seminary (now "Moba"), where he studied from 1951 until 1957. This major seminary was administered by the White Fathers. While there, he studied both philosophy and theology. He graduated with a degree in theology from the Lovanium University of Kinshasa. Later, he studied at the Catholic University of Louvain in Belgium from 1961 until 1962, graduating with a Doctorate in Theology. He then studied further from 1962 until 1965 and was awarded a "Magisterium" in Theology.

== Priest ==
He was ordained a priest of the Archdiocese of Lubumbashi on 9 August 1959 by Bishop José Floriberto Cornelis, Titular Bishop of Tunes. As a young priest, he "began to deepen the question of the possibility of an African theology". Pope John XXIII appointed him as an Expert at the Second Vatican Council, when he was a holder of a master's degree in theology. In 1966, Pope Paul VI, appointed him as the "Pope's Prelate".

== Bishop ==
On 6 December 1970, The Holy Father Pope Paul VI appointed him Auxiliary Bishop of the Archdiocese of Kinshasa. On the same day, he was concurrently appointed Titular Bishop of Scampa. He was consecrated bishop on 6 December 1970 at Kinshasa by the hands of Cardinal Joseph-Albert Malula, Archbishop of Kinshasa assisted by Archbishop Eugène Kabanga Songasonga, Archbishop of Lubumbashi and Archbishop Martin-Léonard Bakole wa Ilunga, Archbishop of Luluabourg (today Archdiocese of Kananga). On 26 November 1991, Pope John Paul II transferred Bishop Tharcisse Tshibangu Tshishiku to the Roman Catholic Diocese of Mbujimayi and appointed him the Local Ordinary of that diocese.

On 1 August 2009 the age-related retirement request of Bishop Tharcisse Tshibangu Tshishiku from the apostolic care of the Catholic Diocese of Mbujimayi was accepted by Pope Francis. He was succeeded by Bishop Bernard Emmanuel Kasanda Mulenga, effective that same day.

Bishop Tharcisse Tshibangu Tshishiku died on 29 December 2021 at the University Clinics of Kinshasa at the age of 88.

== See also ==
- Catholic Church in the Democratic Republic of the Congo

== Succession table ==
Preceded by	Auxiliary Bishop of Kinshasa (1 September 1970 – 26 November 1991)	Succeeded by
Preceded by Joseph Ngogi Nkongolo (3 May 1966 – 26 November 1991)	Bishop of Mbujimayi (26 November 1991 – 1 August 2009)	Succeeded by Bernard Emmanuel Kasanda Mulenga (since 1 August 2009)
