= Diocese of Tshilomba =

Roman Catholic diocese in the Democratic Republic of the Congo

Diocese of Tshilomba Dioecesis Tshilombana

Location
- Country: Democratic Republic of the Congo
- Ecclesiastical province: Province of Kananga
- Metropolitan: Félicien Ntambue Kasembe

Statistics
- Area: 11,747 km^{2} (4,536 sq mi)
- Population: Total; Catholics: 1,320,000; 792,000 (60%)
- Parishes: 27

Information
- Denomination: Roman Catholic
- Rite: Roman Rite
- Established: March 25, 2022; 3 years ago
- Cathedral: Saint James Cathedral in Tshilomba
- Secular priests: 76

Current leadership
- Pope: Leo XIV
- Bishop: Sebastien Kenda Ntumba

The Roman Catholic Diocese of Tshilomba (Latin: Dioecesis Tshilombana) is a diocese of the Roman Catholic Church in the Democratic Republic of the Congo.

== History ==
- 25 March 2022: the diocese was established from the Diocese of Luiza It is suffragan to the Metropolitan Archdiocese of Kananga. The cathedral is the parish church of Saint Jacques in Tshilomba.

== Ordinaries ==
Bishops

1. Sebastien Kenda Ntumba (since 25 Mar 2022)

== See also ==
- Roman Catholicism in the Democratic Republic of the Congo
