= Vincent Tshomba Shamba Kotsho =

Congolese Catholic prelate (born 1963)

The Most Reverend Vincent Tshomba Shamba Kotsho
- Bishop of Tshumbe, Democratic Republic of the Congo
- Church: Catholic Church
- Archdiocese: Roman Catholic Archdiocese of Kananga
- See: Roman Catholic Diocese of Tshumbe
- Appointed: 11 June 2022
- Installed: 11 June 2022
- Predecessor: Nicolas Djomo Lola
- Successor: Incumbent
- Other post: Auxiliary Bishop of Kinshasa (29 June 2020 - 11 June 2022)

Orders
- Ordination: 1 August 1990 by Eugène Moke Motsüri
- Consecration: 10 October 2020 by Cardinal Fridolin Ambongo Besungu
- Rank: Bishop

Personal details
- Born: Vincent Tshomba Shamba Kotsho; 22 January 1963 (age 63) Kinshasa, Democratic Republic of the Congo

Styles of Vincent Tshomba Shamba Kotsho
- Reference style: Your Lordship; The Most Reverend
- Spoken style: His Lordship
- Religious style: Bishop

Vincent Tshomba Shamba Kotsho (born 22 January 1963) is a Congolese Catholic prelate who is the Bishop of the Roman Catholic Diocese of Tshumbe in the Democratic Republic of the Congo since 11 June 2022. Before that, from 29 June 2020 until 11 June 2022, he was an Auxiliary Bishop of the Roman Catholic Archdiocese of Kinshasa. He was appointed bishop on 29 June 2020 by Pope Francis. He concurrently served as Titular Bishop of Oescus, while he was auxiliary bishop. He was consecrated as bishop at Kinshasa on 10 October 2020. He was transferred to the Diocese of Tshumbe on 11 June 2022 and was installed there as the Local Ordinary on 10 August 2022.

== Background and education ==
He was born on 22 January 1963 in Kinshasa. He attended local schools for his elementary and secondary school education. He studied Philosophy from 1981 until 1984 at the Saint Kaggwa Major Seminary in Kinshasa. He then studied Theology from 1985 until 1989 at the Saint John XXIII Major Seminary, also in Kinshasa.

== Priest ==
On 1 August 1990, he was ordained a priest of the Roman Catholic Archdiocese of Kinshasa by Bishop Eugène Moke Motsüri, Titular Bishop of Lestrona. He served as priest until 29 June 2020.

While a priest, he served in various roles including as:

- Parish Vicar of Saint-Augustin from 1990 until 1994.
- Parish Vicar of Saint André from 1994 until 1996.
- Parish priest of Mama wa Bosawa from 1996 until 2003.
- Parish priest of Saint Frédéric from 1996 until 1997.
- Parish Priest of Saint Marc and Dean from 2003 until 2008.
- Parish priest of Saint-Augustin and parish priest of Saint Gabriel from 2008 until 2014.
- Parish Priest of Saint-Joseph and Dean from 2014 until 2018.
- Parish priest of Saint Albert the Great, diocesan chaplain of Justice and Peace. Member of the Presbyteral Council from 2018 until 2020.

== Bishop ==
Pope Francis appointed him Auxiliary Bishop of Kinshasa on 29 June 2020. He was contemporaneously appointed Titular Bishop of Oescus and served as such while auxiliary bishop. He was consecrated and installed at Kinshasa on 10 October 2020 by the hands of Cardinal Fridolin Ambongo Besungu, Archbishop of Kinshasa assisted by Archbishop Ettore Balestrero, Titular Archbishop of Victoriana and Archbishop Marcel Utembi Tapa, Archbishop of Kisangani.

On 11 June 2022, The Holy See accepted the age-related resignation from pastoral care of the Catholic Diocese of Tshumbe, DRC presented by Bishop Nicolas Djomo Lola. The Holy Father appointed Bishop Vincent Tshomba Shamba Kotsho, previously auxiliary bishop of Kinshasa as the new Local Ordinary at Tshumbe. He was installed at Tshumbe on 10 August 2022.

== See also ==
- Catholic Church in the Democratic Republic of the Congo

== Succession table ==
Catholic Church titles
Preceded by	Auxiliary Bishop of Kinshasa (29 Jun 2020 - 11 June 2022)	Succeeded by
Preceded by Nicolas Djomo Lola (20 May 1997 - 11 June 2022)	Bishop of Tshumbe (since 11 June 2022)	Succeeded by Incumbent
