= Félicien Mwanama Galumbulula =

- Bishop of Luiza
- Church: Catholic Church
- Diocese: Diocese of Luiza
- Appointed: 3 January 2014
- Predecessor: Léonard Kasanda Lumembu

Orders
- Ordination: 9 August 1987
- Consecration: 23 March 2014 by Adolfo Tito Yllana

Personal details
- Born: 26 October 1960 (age 65) Tshibala (south of Bulungu), Kasaï Province, Republic of the Congo

Félicien Mwanama Galumbulula (born 26 October 1960) is a Congolese prelate of the Catholic Church who has been bishop of Luiza in the Democratic Republic of the Congo (DRC) since 2014.

== Biography ==
Félicien Mwanama Galumbulula was born on 26 October 1960 in the village of Tshibala (Note: A Caritas report in March 2019 refers to aid delivered to "la Zone de Santé de Tshibala, dans le Territoire de Kazumba, Secteur de Kavula". Mwanama said the aid was targeted at the villages of Yangala and Tshibala based on the level of distress, difficulty of access, and neglect by other aid interventions.) in the newly independent Republic of the Congo. After attending primary schools in Tshibala from 1968 to 1974 and secondary schools at the Popopu Institute in Tshibala from 1974 to 1980, he completed his studies in philosophy at the Christ the King Major Seminary in Kabwe in Zambia from 1980 to 1983 and in theology at the Major Seminary in Fano, Italy, from 1983 to 1986. He was ordained a priest on 9 August 1987.

Mwanama held the following positions: 1987-1988: Spiritual Director and Professor at the preparatory seminary of St Léon in Luiza; 1988-1992: Spiritual Director and Professor at the Jean Paul II Major Seminary in Tschilomba. From 1992 to 1996 he completed his doctoral studies in missiology at the Pontifical Gregorian University and then studied at the Pontifical Lateran University from 1996 to 2002, earning a doctorate in canon law. He was then Vice Chancellor of the Diocese of Rieti in Italy and an assistant parish priest in Sant'Agostino parish there for the year 2000–2001. He returned to the DRC where he taught at the Catholic University of the Congo in Kinshasa for more than a decade. He was also a professor at the Major Seminary of Malole-Kananga from 2002 to 2004, interim rector there from 2004 to 2006, and professor at the African Institute of Missionary Science in Kinshasa from 2005 to 2014.

Within the Episcopal Conference of the Democratic Republic of the Congo (CENCO), he was secretary of the Episcopal Commission for Legal Affairs from 2006 to 2008 and Second Deputy Secretary General from 2008 to 2014.

Pope Francis appointed him bishop of Luiza on 3 January 2014. He was installed there when he received his episcopal consecration in the Luiza soccer stadium on 23 March from Archbishop Adolfo Tito Yllana, apostolic nuncio to the DRC. The national government was represented by Richard Muyej, minister of the interior. Mwanama is the first bishop of the diocese to come from the secular clergy.

In February 2017, Mwanama reported that "unimaginable atrocities" had been committed against civilians in his region, caught in violence between local militias and national military forces. The bishop reported that many parishes had been looted and said that "the population is in the throes of psychosis to the point that it is impossible to organise the funeral of the victims". In April, after receiving death threats from militia forces, Mwanama fled to safety in Kinshasa. He returned in August. (Note: Bishop Pierre-Célestin Tshitoko Mamba of Luebo also fled his dioceses for the same four months)

In November 2020, he pleaded for aid in rebuilding in the wake of violence, reporting that many people had fled to Angola but been sent back. He said stabilizing village life required the rehabilitation of health facilities and schools, and road construction, organized in order to provide employment for the peasants, who also needed agricultural tools and seed.

== Writings ==
- Mwanama Galumbulula, Félicien (1996). Le dynamisme missionnaire de l'Église locale dans la missiologie postconciliaire de J. Masson et A. Seumois: une contribution à l'éveil missionnaire (in French). Gregorian & Biblical Press.

== See also ==
- Kamwina Nsapu rebellion
