= KBN =

KBN could refer to:

- Kare language, ISO 639-3 language code
- Kilburn High Road railway station, London, England; National Rail station code
- Tunta Airport, Kabinda, Democratic Republic of the Congo, IATA airport code
