= Kananga (commune) =

Commune in Kananga City, DR Congo

- Commune
- Location within Democratic Republic of the Congo
- Coordinates: 5°54′01″S 22°28′11″E
- Country: Democratic Republic of the Congo
- Province: Kasaï-Central
- City: Kananga

Kananga is a commune of the city of Kananga, which is located in the Kasaï-Central province of the Democratic Republic of the Congo. It is the most populous commune of the city.

The commune is located in middle of the city and is home to many of the provincial offices, including the Provincial Assembly and Governor for Kasaï-Central.
