= Nganza =

Coordinates: 4.318822°S 15.311707°E

Nganza is a commune of the city of Kananga in the Democratic Republic of the Congo.

== History ==
In March 2017, during the Kamuina Nsapu war more than 300 people were killed in the town.
