= Diocese of Kole =

Roman Catholic diocese in the Democratic Republic of the Congo

Coordinates: 3.4356°S 22.4744°E

Diocese of Kole Dioecesis Kolensis

Location
- Country: Democratic Republic of the Congo
- Metropolitan: Kananga

Statistics
- Area: 66,000 km^{2} (25,000 sq mi)
- Population: Total; Catholics: (as of 2002); 280,000; 59,000 (21.1%)

Information
- Rite: Latin Rite

Current leadership
- Pope: Leo XIV
- Bishop: Emery Kibal Nkufi Mansong'loo, CP
- Bishops emeritus: Stanislas Lukumwena Lumbala, OFM

The Roman Catholic Diocese of Kole (Latin: Kolen(sis)) is a diocese located in the city of Kole in the ecclesiastical province of Kananga in the Democratic Republic of the Congo. It is coterminous with the Territoires ("counties") of Kole, Dekese and Lomela.

== History ==
- 14 June 1951: Established as Apostolic Prefecture of Kole from the Apostolic Vicariate of Léopoldville
- 14 September 1967: Promoted as Diocese of Kole

== Leadership, in reverse chronological order ==
- Bishops of Kole (Latin Rite), below
  - Bishop Emery Kibal Nkufi Mansong'loo, C.P. (since 6 May 2015)
  - Bishop Stanislas Lukumwena Lumbala, O.F.M. (14 February 1998 – 30 October 2008)
  - Bishop Louis Nkinga Bondala, C.I.C.M. (28 January 1980 – 13 March 1996)
  - Bishop Victor Van Beurden, SS.CC. (14 September 1967 – 28 January 1980); see below
- Prefect Apostolic of Kole (Latin Rite)
  - Father Victor Van Beurden, SS.CC. (22 June 1951 – 14 September 1967); see above

== See also ==
- Roman Catholicism in the Democratic Republic of the Congo
- Kole, Democratic Republic of the Congo

== Sources ==
- GCatholic.org
- Catholic Hierarchy
