= Luebo Airport =

- IATA: none; ICAO: FZUN

Summary
- Airport type: Public
- Serves: Luebo
- Elevation AMSL: 1,630 ft / 497 m
- Coordinates: 5°21′4″S 21°25′20″E

Map
- Location of the airport in Democratic Republic of the Congo

Runways
Direction	Length		Surface
Direction	m	ft	Surface
04/22	710	2,329	Grass
- Sources: Google Maps GCM

Luebo Airport (ICAO: FZUN) is an airstrip serving the town of Luebo in Kasai Province, Democratic Republic of the Congo.

== See also ==
- List of airports in the Democratic Republic of the Congo
