= Josephites of Belgium =

Catholic clergymen congregation

Institute of the Josephites of Belgium
- Institutum Iosephitarum Gerardimontensium
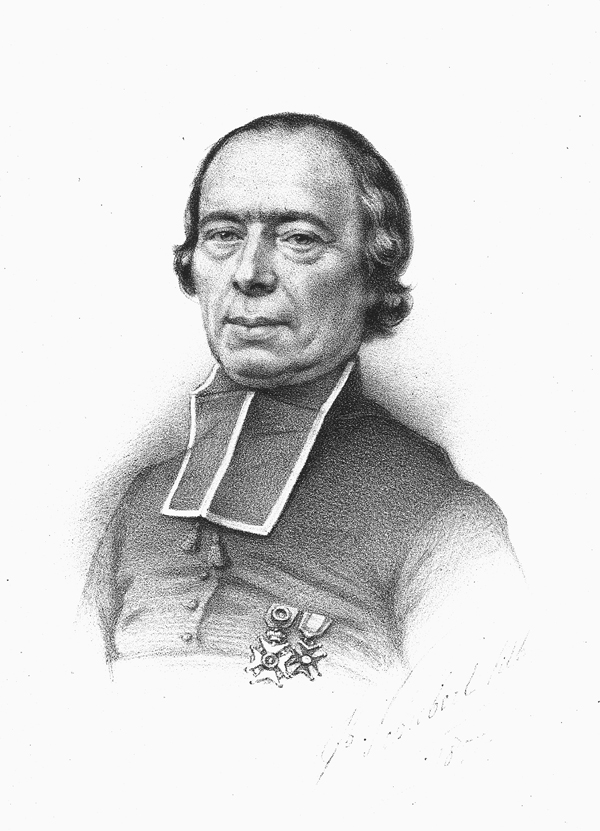
- Constant Van Crombrugghe
- Abbreviation: Post-nominal letters: C.J.
- Nickname: Josephites
- Established: May 1st, 1817; 208 years ago
- Founder: Fr. Constant Guillaume van Crombrugghe
- Founded at: Ghent, Belgium
- Type: Clerical Religious Congregation of Pontifical Right for Men
- Headquarters: General Motherhouse; Karmelietenstraat 57, Geraardsbergen, Belgium
- Coordinates: 41°54′4.9″N 12°27′38.2″E
- Members: 122 members (includes 66 priests) as of 2018
- Superior General: Fr. Jacob Beya Kadumbu, CJ
- Patron saint: St. Joseph
- Parent organization: Roman Catholic Church
- Website: www.josephite.community

The Institute of the Josephites of Belgium (Latin: Institutum Iosephitarum Gerardimontensium), commonly called Josephites is a Roman Catholic clerical religious congregation of pontifical right for men devoted to the Christian education of the youth It was founded in Ghent Belgium by Canon van Crombrugghe, in 1817. Its members add the nominal letters C.J. after their names to indicate membership in the Institute.

While their primary apostolate is the education of the youth, they also have a missionary past in Africa. Their headquarters is at Karmelietenstraat 57, 9500 Geraardsbergen, Belgium. The organisation is a Congregation of Pontifical Right.

== History ==
The Josephites were founded in the Diocese of Ghent by Canon Constant van Crombrugghe in 1817. Members of the congregation use the initials "C.J." after their names.

The purpose was the education of children from poorer backgrounds who might not otherwise go to school. The congregation set up a commercial school and an industrial school.

As of 2017 the congregation had established four schools in Belgium, two in England, one in the United States, and nine in the Democratic Republic of Congo.

== Statistics ==
In 2018, they had 9 houses, with 111 members including 72 priests.

== Prelates from their ranks ==
Deceased

- Marcel Evariste van Rengen, C.J.,
  Apostolic Prefect (1957 – 29 September 1964)
  Bishop of Mweka (Congo-Kinshasa) (29 September 1964 – death 15 March 1988)

== Superiors general ==
- Founder: Father Constant Guillaume van Crombrugghe (1817) (Belgium)

- Ignatius van den Bossche (1817 – 1851)
- Stanislas De Haeck (1851 – 1850)
- Remi de Saedeleer (1860 – 1869)
- Félicien Campe (1869 – 1893)
- Gustave De Meyer (1893 – 1898)
- Felix Vlieghe (1899 – 1922)
- Antonin Wicart (1922 – 1932)
- Théophile De Paepe (1933 – 1938)
- Hilaire Sterckx (1938 – 1950)
- Hubert Trévis (1950 – 1956)
- George Kean (1956 – 1962)
- Emmanuel Devroye (1962 – 1974)
- Leonard de Kort (1974 – 1983)
- John Mayhew (1983 – 1989)
- Jean-Marie Vander Stricht (1989 – 1990)
- Guillermo C. García (1990 – 1996)
- J Richard Lear (1996 – 2001)
- Robert D. Hamilton (2001 – 2016)
- Jacob Beya Kadumbu (2016 – )

== See also ==
- St George's College, Weybridge
