= Lukonga =

Commune in Kananga City, DR Congo

- Commune
- Location within Democratic Republic of the Congo
- Coordinates: 5°53′32″S 22°24′10″E
- Country: Democratic Republic of the Congo
- Province: Kasaï-Central
- City: Kananga

Lukonga is a commune of the city of Kananga, which is located in the Kasaï-Central province of the Democratic Republic of the Congo.

The commune has both urban and rural characteristics, spanning from the city of Kananga to farming villages in the nearby Demba Territory. The N7 road passes through the commune.
