= St George's College, Weybridge =

Public school in Weybridge, Surrey, England

St George's Weybridge

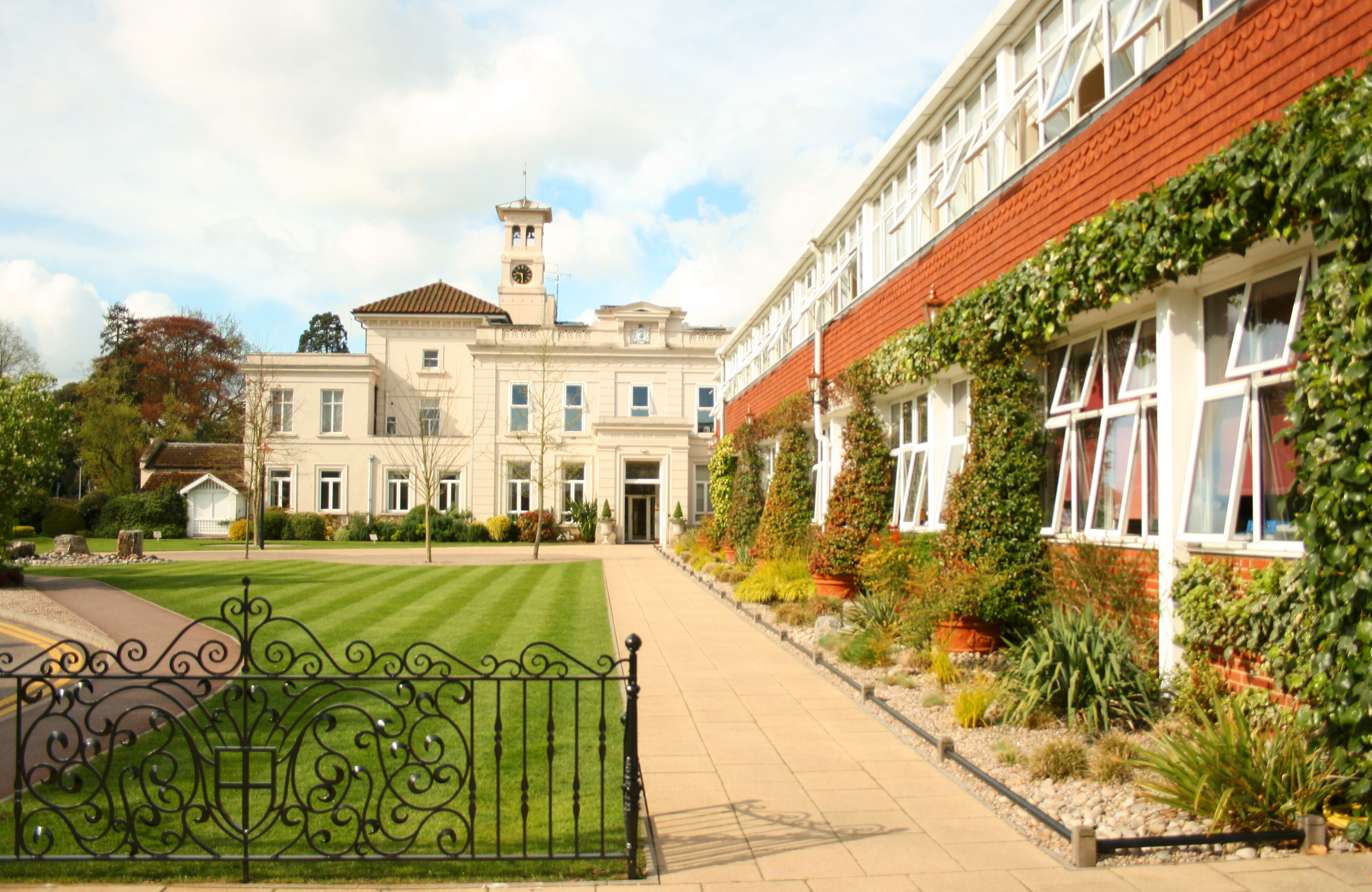
- The front of St George's College

Location
- Addlestone, Surrey, KT15 2QS; England
- Coordinates: 51.376°N 0.478°W

Information
- Type: Public school Private day school
- Motto: Amore et Labore (Love and work)
- Religious affiliation: Roman Catholic
- Established: 1869
- Founders: Josephites
- Department for Education URN: 125361 Tables
- Chair of Governors: Denis Nowlan
- Headmistress: Rachel Owens
- Staff: 480
- Gender: Co-educational
- Age: 11 to 18
- Enrolment: 1043
- Houses: Stirling; Southcote; Kilmorey; Petre; Woburn; King
- Colours: Maroon and white
- Publication: Always Georgian (alumni magazine)
- Former pupils: Old Georgians
- Website: https://www.stgeorgesweybridge.com

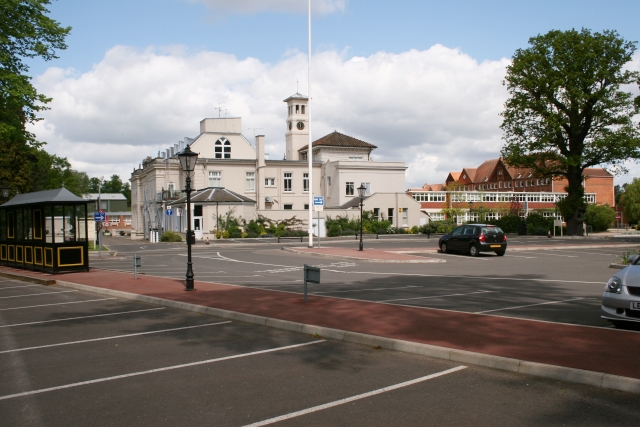
The front of the College and teaching blocks

St George's Weybridge is a selective independent mixed Roman Catholic co-educational Josephite day school in Surrey, taking pupils from 2 to 18. St George's Weybridge is made up of St George's Junior School (2–11) and St George's College (11–18).

== History ==
St George’s Weybridge was founded in 1869 by a Belgian Catholic order of priests called the Josephites, and was originally based in Croydon. Within a few years St George’s had outgrown its Croydon location and in 1884 moved to the grounds of Woburn Park near Weybridge. In the 18th century, Woburn Park became famous as the first ornamental farm developed by its then-owner, Philip Southcote. After his death, the estate had numerous owners including William Petre, who purchased the estate in 1876 and established the first Catholic school on the site before he sold it to the Josephites.

The Josephite order once provided the entire staff and management of the school. Today, although much reduced in number, they still reside on the same site.

St George’s was originally a boys' boarding school but starting in the 1960s girls were allowed to join the 6th Form. St George’s became a day school in 1992, became co-educational in 1998, and in 2000 absorbed the nearby girls' school St Maur’s, run by the Congregation of the Holy Infant Jesus. The acquisition of the St Maur’s site resulted in another phase of expansion and provided a new home for the Junior School in central Weybridge.

== Overview ==
The school's mission statement is "To inspire all in our Josephite, Georgian Family to be the very best version of themselves."

The college is on the outskirts of Addlestone and consists of approximately 1050 pupils aged between eleven and eighteen, and six houses: King, Woburn, Kilmorey, Southcote, Stirling, and Petre, the original four (Kilmorey, Southcote, Stirling and Petre) named after the four owners of the building before it was converted to a school and King and Woburn were added in 2017. The Junior School is in Weybridge, close to the high street, with around 600 pupils aged between three and eleven. It has four houses: Owls, Eagles, Hawks, and Kestrels, represented by green, yellow, black/white and maroon respectively.

The college sports facilities are extensive and include three outdoor netball courts, two 11-a-side hockey pitches, five rugby pitches, a 400m athletics track, dance studio, and three football pitches. In the summer there are six rounders pitches and five cricket pitches. The tennis centre provides four indoor courts, three outdoor clay courts and three grass courts. The activity centre opened in October 2019 and has a large sports hall, climbing wall, two dance studios and a fitness gym. The six-court sports hall provides facilities for hockey, badminton, volleyball, basketball, netball, 5-a-side football, cricket and trampolining. There is also a boathouse for the St George's College Boat Club.

The River Bourne (Chertsey Branch) enters the grounds in the north-west corner and the River Bourne (Addlestone Branch) enters the school grounds from the south-east corner. The two rivers meet in the northeastern corner before flowing northwards into the River Thames at Addlestone. The entire ground covers 100 acres (40 ha) of land much of which is woodland. The college owns a boathouse on the Thames in nearby Walton.

There is an attached junior school, St George's Junior School Weybridge, which occupies 20 acres (8.1 ha). The previous name for the junior school was Woburn Hill School and the grounds of what was Woburn Park here is a listed park and garden in the English Heritage protection register.

== Notable alumni ==
- Marcus Agius
- David Atkinson
- Sean Bobbitt
- Dimension
- Adam Hollioake
- Ben Hollioake
- Will Jacks
- Daniel Kawczynski
- David Laws
- Stephen Lloyd
- Sir Simon Mayall
- Sir Richard Moore
- Monique Roffey
- Sir Clive Sinclair
- Anthony Watson
- Marcus Watson
- Isabel Webster
- Stuart Wilde
