= Ndesha =

Commune in Kananga City, DR Congo

- Commune
- Location within Democratic Republic of the Congo
- Coordinates: 5.8651°S 22.3859°E
- Country: Democratic Republic of the Congo
- Province: Kasaï-Central
- City: Kananga

Ndesha is a commune of the city of Kananga, which is located in the Kasaï-Central province of the Democratic Republic of the Congo. It is the least populated commune in the city.

The commune was originally built by the Belgian authorities in the colonial period. At the time, Belgian segregation meant that the indigenous Lulua people were not permitted to access the city of Kananga, then called Luluabourg. Ndesha represented one of the closest places to the city that the Congolese could live. In the 1950s, the commune became a hub of political and anticolonial protests.

A Presbyterian mission was opened in the commune in 1946.
