= Katoka =

Commune of the city of Kananga, Democratic Republic of the Congo

Katoka is a commune in the city of Kananga in the Democratic Republic of the Congo. A rural mission medical station was stationed there in the 1960s.
