= Diocese of Mweka =

Roman Catholic diocese in the Democratic Republic of the Congo

Diocese of Mweka Dioecesis Mvekaensis

Location
- Country: Democratic Republic of the Congo
- Metropolitan: Kananga

Statistics
- Area: 21,700 km^{2} (8,400 sq mi)
- Population: Total; Catholics: (as of 2001); 420,000; 196,500 (46.8%)

Information
- Rite: Latin Rite

Current leadership
- Pope: Leo XIV
- Bishop: Oscar Nkolo Kanowa, C.I.C.M.

The Roman Catholic Diocese of Mweka (Latin: Mvekaën(sis)) is a Latin suffragan diocese in the ecclesiastical province of The Metropolitan of Kananga in the Democratic Republic of the Congo, it depends on the missionary Roman Congregation for the Evangelization of Peoples.

Its cathedral episcopal see is the Cathédrale Saint-Martin, in the city of Mweka in Kasai Province.

== Statistics ==
As per 2014, it pastorally served 346,580 Catholics (41.2% of 840,645 total) on 21,700 km² in 14 parishes with 43 priests (32 diocesan, 11 religious), 34 lay religious (21 brothers, 13 sisters) and 35 seminarians.

== History ==
- Established on 24 March 1953 as the Apostolic Prefecture of Mweka, on territory split off from the then Apostolic Vicariate of Luluabourg
- Promoted on 29 September 1964 as the Diocese of Mweka.

== Ordinaries ==
(all Latin Rite)

Apostolic Prefects of Mweka

- Apostolic administrator Bernard Mels, Scheutists (C.I.C.M.) (1953-1957), while Titular Bishop of Belali (10 March 1949 – 10 November 1959) & Apostolic Vicar of Luluabourg (Congo-Kinshasa) (10 March 1949 – 10 November 1959), later promoted that see's first Metropolitan Archbishop (10 November 1959 – 26 September 1967), then Archbishop-Bishop of Lwiza (Congo-Kinshasa) (26 September 1967 – retired 3 October 1970), emeritate as Titular Archbishop of Pulcheriopolis (3 October 1970 – resigned 17 May 1986), died 1992
- Marcel Evariste van Rengen, Josephites of Belgium (C.J.) (1957 – 29 September 1964 see below)

Suffragan Bishops of Mweka

- Marcel Evariste Van Rengen, C.J. (see above 29 September 1964 – death 15 March 1988)
- Apostolic administrator Emery Kabongo Kanundowi (1988 – 19 January 1989), while Archbishop-Bishop of Luebo (Congo-Kinshasa) (10 December 1987 – retired 14 August 2003); previously Second Private Secretary of the Pope (1982 – 10 December 1987)
- Gérard Mulumba Kalemba (19 January 1989 – 18 February 2017), died 15 April 2020
- Oscar Nkolo Kanowa, Scheutists (C.I.C.M.) (since 18 February 2017)

== See also ==
- List of Roman Catholic dioceses in the Democratic Republic of the Congo
- Roman Catholicism in the Democratic Republic of the Congo

== Sources and external links ==
- GCatholic.org, with incumbent biography links and Google satellite photo
- Catholic Hierarchy
