= Kole Sur Lukenie Airport =

- IATA: none; ICAO: FZVC

Summary
- Serves: Kole, DR Congo
- Elevation AMSL: 1,542 ft / 470 m
- Coordinates: 3°25′10″S 22°30′55″E

Map
- Location of Airport in the DR Congo

Runways
Direction	Length		Surface
Direction	m	ft	Surface
11/29	1,300	4,265	Grass
- Source: Google Maps GCM

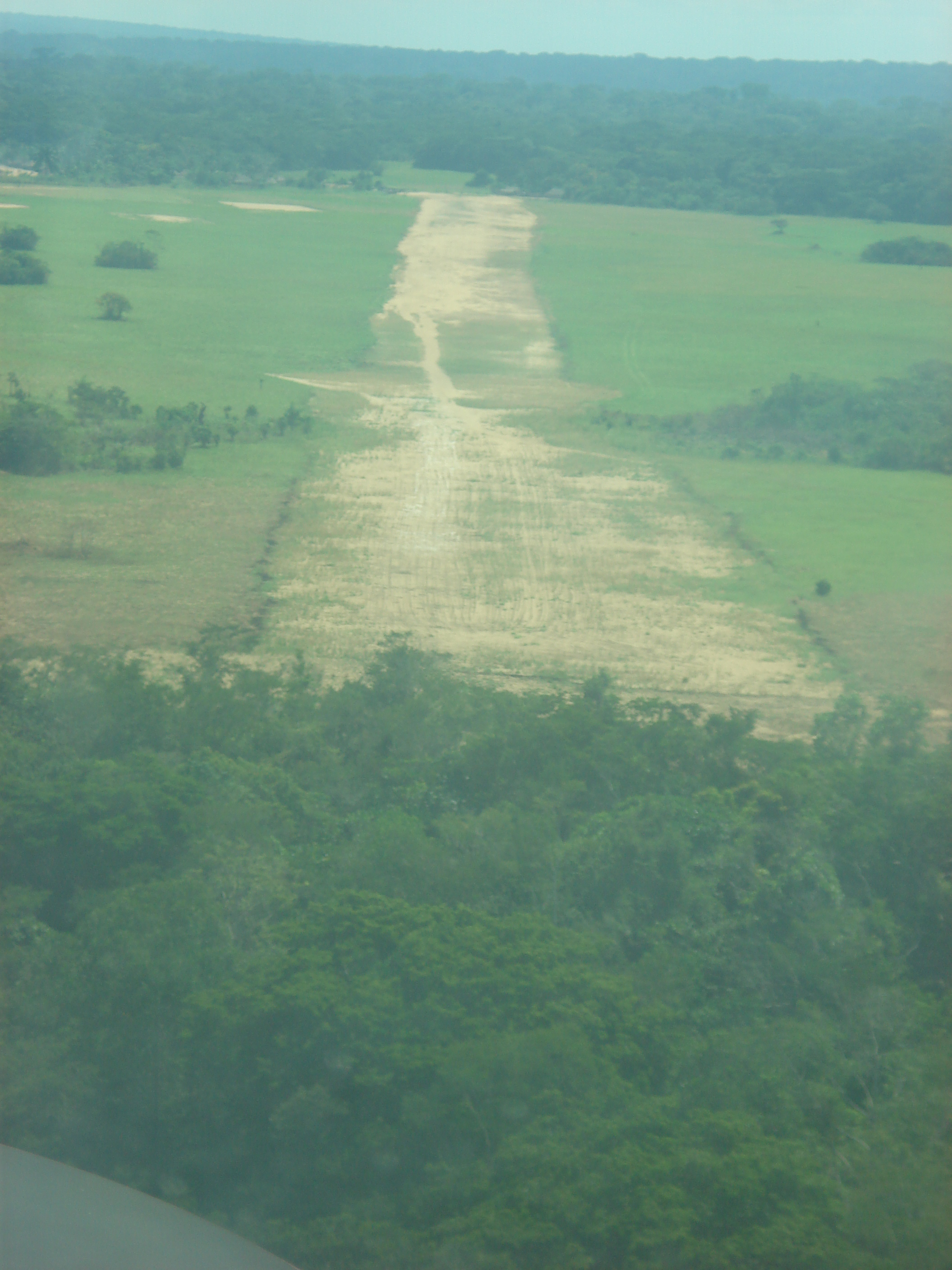
On final approach at Kole sur Lukenie airfield

Kole Sur Lukenie Airport (ICAO: FZVC) is an airport serving Kole in Sankuru Province, Democratic Republic of the Congo. It is a dirt airstrip with 1,300 metres (4,300 ft) of usable length.

== Charter services ==
There are no regularly scheduled commercial or charter services to Kole. However, aid and missionary services like MAF and AirServ fly there on an irregular basis about a dozen times per year.

== See also ==
- Transport in the Democratic Republic of the Congo
- List of airports in the Democratic Republic of the Congo
