= Diocese of Tshumbe =

Diocese in the Democratic Republic of the Congo

Diocese of Tshumbe Dioecesis Tshumbeensis

Location
- Country: Democratic Republic of the Congo
- Metropolitan: Kananga

Statistics
- Area: 60,000 km^{2} (23,000 sq mi)
- Population: Total; Catholics: (as of 2004); 683,288; 331,353 (48.5%)

Information
- Rite: Latin Rite

Current leadership
- Pope: Leo XIV
- Bishop: Vincent Tshomba Shamba Kotsho

The Roman Catholic Diocese of Tshumbe (Latin: Tshumbeen(sis)) is a Latin suffragan diocese in the ecclesiastical province of Kananga in the Democratic Republic of the Congo.

Its cathedral episcopal see is Cathédrale Sainte-Marie in the city of Tshumbe in Kasai-Oriental.

== History ==
- 25 May 1936: Established as Apostolic Prefecture of Tshumbe, on territory split off from the then Apostolic Vicariate of Upper Kasai
- 14 March 1947: Promoted as Apostolic Vicariate of Tshumbe, hence entitled to a titular bishop
- Lost territory on 14 June 1951: to establish the Apostolic Prefecture of Kole
- 10 November 1959: Promoted as Diocese of Tshumbe

== Ordinaries ==
(all Latin Rite)

Apostolic Prefect of Tshumbe

- Joseph Augustin Hagendorens, Passionists (C.P.) (28 Jul 1936 – 14 March 1947 see below)

Apostolic Vicar of Tshumbe

- Joseph Augustin Hagendorens, C.P. (see above 14 March 1947 – 10 November 1959 see below), Titular Bishop of Caffa (23 March 1947 – 10 November 1959)

Suffragan Bishops of Tshumbe

- Joseph Augustin Hagendorens, C.P. (see above 10 November 1959 – 9 April 1968), later Titular Bishop of Sicca Veneria (9 April 1968 – death 20 April 1976)
- Albert Tshomba Yungu (9 April 1968 – 22 July 1995); also President of National Episcopal Conference of Congo (1975 – 1979)
- Nicolas Djomo Lola (20 May 1997 – 11 June 2022); also President of Association of Episcopal Conferences of Central Africa (2002 – 07.2007), President of National Episcopal Conference of Congo (2008 – 24 June 2016).
- Vincent Tshomba Shamba Kotsho (since 11 June 2022)

== See also ==
- Roman Catholicism in the Democratic Republic of the Congo

== Source and External links ==
- GCatholic.org
- Catholic Hierarchy
