= Valentin Masengo Mkinda =

Congolese Catholic priest (1940–2018)

Valentin Masengo Mkinda (10 December 1940 – 26 October 2018) was a Catholic bishop in the Democratic Republic of the Congo. He was ordained in 1969 for the Diocese of Kabinda, and was its Bishop from 1995 to his death in 2018.

== Biography ==
Masengo Mkinda was born in the Democratic Republic of the Congo and was ordained to the priesthood in 1969. He served as bishop of the Roman Catholic Diocese of Kabinda, the Democratic Republic of the Congo, from 1995 until his death in 2018.
