= Tunta Airport =

- IATA: KBN; ICAO: FZWT

Summary
- Serves: Kabinda
- Elevation AMSL: 2,766 ft / 843 m
- Coordinates: 6°07′14″S 24°32′46″E

Map
- Location of airport in the Democratic Republic of the Congo

Runways
Direction	Length		Surface
Direction	m	ft	Surface
07/25	1,580	5,184	Grass
- Source: GCM Google Maps

Tunta Airport (IATA: KBN, ICAO: FZWT) is an airport serving the town of Kabinda, Lomami Province, Democratic Republic of the Congo.

== See also ==
- Transport in the Democratic Republic of the Congo
- List of airports in the Democratic Republic of the Congo
