= Kole, Democratic Republic of the Congo =

Town in central Democratic Republic of the Congo

Kole Mji wa Kole (Swahili)
- Urban centre in the Democratic Republic of the Congo
- Ville de Kole
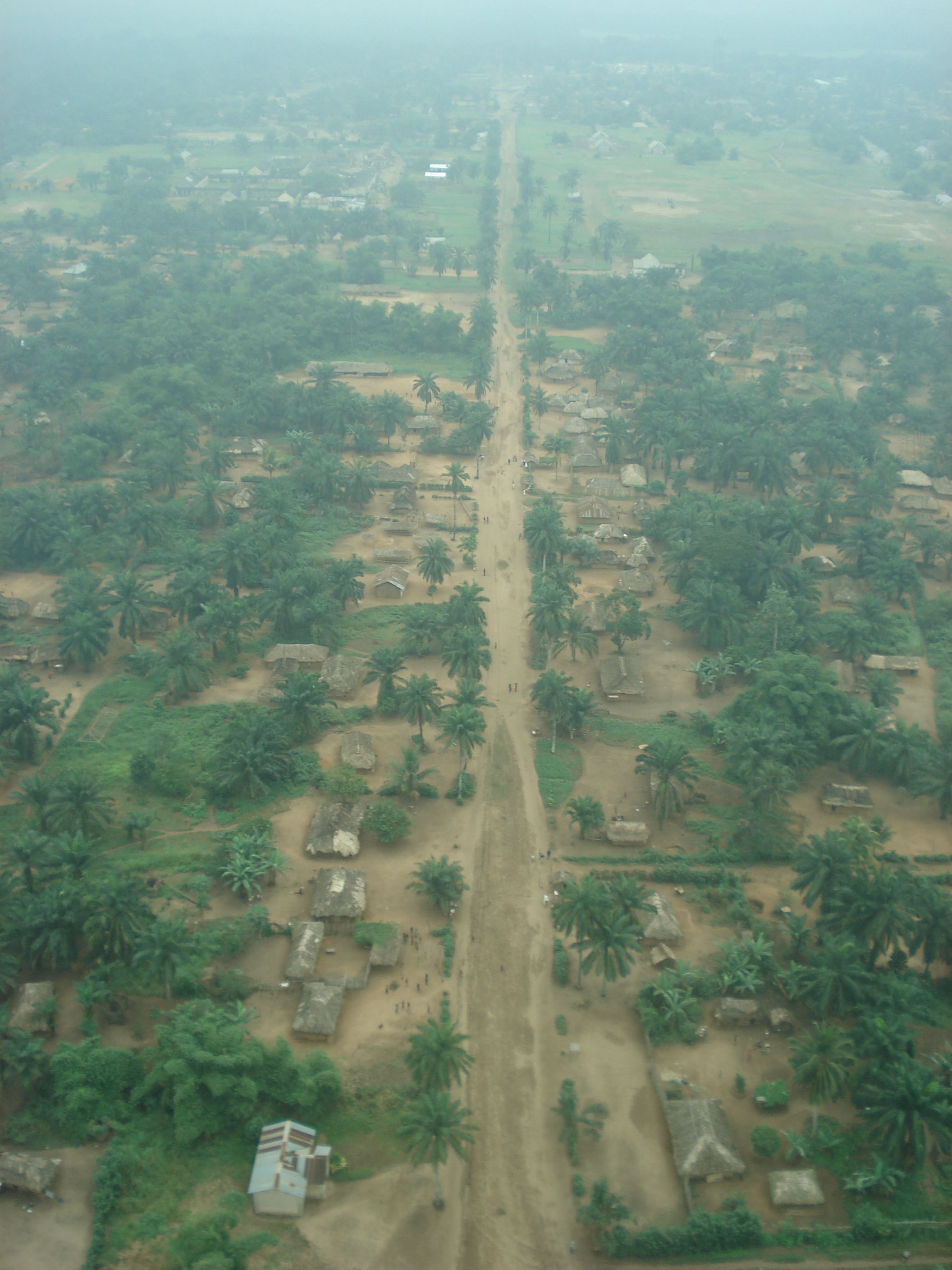
- Aerial view of Kole, Democratic Republic of the Congo, in 2007 (Main thoroughfare; Hôpital General de Référence at upper left)

- Location within Democratic Republic of the Congo
- Coordinates: 3°27′38″S 22°26′32″E
- Country: Democratic Republic of the Congo
- Province: Sankuru
- Town: 1958
- Elevation: 470 m (1,540 ft)

Population (2007 estimate)
  - Urban: 10,000
  - Summer (DST): UTC+2 (CAT)

Kole is a remote town in central Democratic Republic of the Congo. It lies within the Kole Territory, which in turn is part of Sankuru Province.

Kole is located along the Lukenie River. It is sometimes called "Kole Sur Lukenie" to distinguish it from other "Koles" in the DRC.

== Demography and ethnography ==
According to local Ministry of Health officials, the population of the town in 2007 was about 10,060 persons (the total for the territory is said to be 71,040). The settlement consists of a few score stuccoed brick buildings, many of them left over from the now defunct cotton plantations of the area. The majority of residents, however, live in very simple wattle and daub houses of their own construction.

The people of Kole, and for tens of kilometers around the town, belong to a subtribe of the Nkutu (or Okutshu) known as the Elembe (also called Ohindu or Ohendo). They speak a dialect (Kihindo) which is mutually intelligible with other Nkutu tongues, as well as with that of their other near neighbors (and relatives), the Tetela. The Elembe are traditionally settled farmers in contrast to other Nkutu groups which are traditional hunting communities. All of these peoples (the Elembe, other Nkutu and the Tetela) are members of the Bantu Mongo "super-tribe". (Additional, smaller Nkutu subtribes/dialects in the area include the Ngongo, the Hamba and the Saka.) Most (perhaps 80 to 90%) tribespeople around Kole also speak Lingala, a few speak French, and a very few speak English.

== Transportation ==
Kole is home to a market and Kole Sur Lukenie Airport.

The Lukenie River is navigable by river barges up to the Kole Landing, but generally no further. A barge from Kinshasa may land at Kole once or twice a year, after a 6- to 12-week journey up the Congo, Kwah (Kasai), Fimi, and Lukenie Rivers. This is not done during the low water season (June–August), however, for fear of stranding for long periods.

The nearest large town to Kole is Lodja, the administrative center of Sankuru District, about 6 hours drive to the east on very poor roads.

== History ==
Located in Kole since 1958 is the Hôpital General de Référence (HGR) Kole (formerly the Centre Médical de Congolais (CMC) Kole). Although a government public health hospital, the facility has been operated since 1970 by a congregation of Roman Catholic nuns, the Missionary Sisters of the Sacred Heart of Jesus (French: Sœurs missionnaires du Sacré-Cœur de Jésus), based in Spain since their founding in 1944. The HGR/K sees a significant number of patients with human monkeypox infection, at times enough to fill a ward.

The town saw incursions by Rwandan soldiers in 2001–2002, during the Second Congo War. The area has been devoid of cattle since that time as the soldiers killed and ate them all. The Rwandans encamped near Dekese, about 100 km downstream from Kole. At least three firefights with Congolese regulars (resulting in about 50 dead Rwandans) persuaded them to move on. This was the furthest point west that the Rwandan "front" extended during the conflict.

== See also ==
- Roman Catholic Diocese of Kole
