= Diocese of Kabinda =

Roman Catholic diocese in the Democratic Republic of the Congo

Coordinates: 6.1296°S 24.4908°E

Diocese of Kabinda Dioecesis Kabindaensis

Location
- Country: Democratic Republic of the Congo
- Metropolitan: Kananga

Statistics
- Area: 58,625 km^{2} (22,635 sq mi)
- Population: Total; Catholics: (as of 2004); 700,000; 200,000 (28.6%)

Information
- Rite: Roman Rite

Current leadership
- Pope: Leo XIV
- Bishop-Elect: Eustache Ntambwe Makoyo

The Roman Catholic Diocese of Kabinda (Latin: Kabindaën(sis)) is a Latin suffragan diocese in the ecclesiastical province of Kananga in the Democratic Republic of the Congo.

Its cathedral episcopal see is located in the city of Kabinda.

== History ==
- 24 March 1953: Established as Apostolic Vicariate of Kabinda from the Apostolic Vicariate of Luluabourg
- 10 November 1959: Promoted as Diocese of Kabinda
- Lost territory on 33 November 1963 to establish the Apostolic Administration of Mbuji-Mayi
- On 10 March 1966, it gained territory from Diocese of Kongolo, and lost territory to Diocese of Kamina
- Lost territory again on 12 January 1974 to the above Diocese of Kamina

== Ordinaries ==
Apostolic Vicars of Kabinda

- Georges Kettel (24 March 1953 – 10 November 1959), Titular Bishop of Thabraca (24 March 1953 – 10 November 1959)

Bishops of Kabinda

- Georges Kettel (10 November 1959 – 19 December 1968), later Titular Bishop of Caorle (19 December 1968 – 16 July 1972)
- Matthieu Kanyama (16 December 1968 – 2 November 1995)
- Valentin Masengo Mkinda (2 November 1995 – 26 October 2018)
- Félicien Ntambue Kasembe (23 July 2020 – 19 March 2024)
- Eustache Ntambwe Makoyo (since 29 July 2026) Bishop-Elect

Apostolic administrators

- Félicien Ntambue Kasembe (19 March 2024 – 29 July 2026)

== See also ==
- Roman Catholicism in the Democratic Republic of the Congo

== Source and External links ==
- GCatholic.org
- Catholic Hierarchy
