= Félicien Ntambue Kasembe =

Congolese Archbishop

His Excellency, The Most Reverend Félicien Ntambue Kasembe CICM
- Metropolitan Archbishop of Kananga
- Church: Catholic Church
- Province: Kananga
- Appointed: 19 March 2024
- Installed: 19 May 2024
- Predecessor: Marcel Madila Basanguka
- Previous posts: Bishop of Kabinda (2020–2024); Apostolic Administrator of Kananga (2022–2024)

Orders
- Ordination: 12 August 2001
- Consecration: 27 September 2020

Personal details
- Born: 8 September 1970 (age 56) Kabinda, Lomami Province, Congo-Kinshasa
- Denomination: Roman Catholicism
- Motto: Latin: Cor Unum et Anima Una, lit. 'One Heart and One Soul'
- Coat of arms

Ordination history of Félicien Ntambue Kasembe
History
Episcopal consecration
- Consecrated by: Ernest Ngboko Ngombe

Félicien Ntambue Kasembe, CICM (born 8 September 1970) is a Congolese prelate of the Catholic Church and a member of the Congregation of the Immaculate Heart of Mary who has been metropolitan archbishop of Kananga since May 2024. He was bishop of Kabinda from 2020 to 2024. Before he became a priest in 2001, he did missionary work in Taiwan, Hong Kong, Singapore, and Mongolia.

== Biography ==
Ntambue Kasembe was born in Kabinda, in the province of Lomami, on 8 September 1970. He graduated with a state diploma in 1988, studying biology and chemistry. He became a novice of the Congregation of the Immaculate Heart of Mary (the Scheut Missionaries) in the Mbudi neighborhood of Kinshasa in 1989 and studied philosophy at the Seminary of Saint Peter Canisius for three years beginning in 1990. Between 1993 and 1996, he undertook an internship as a missionary in Taiwan, Hong Kong, Singapore and Mongolia. He then made his final vows as a Scheut Missionary. He studied theology in the Philippines and Cameroon from 1996 until 2001. On 12 August 2001, Ntambue was ordained a priest in Kabinda.

After ordination, Ntambue's first pastoral assignment was as vicar of Saint Eugène church in Menkao, Kinshasa, where he served for two years and became pastor. He then worked for his order as Provincial Secretary and Rector of Scheutists in Kinshasa from 2003 to 2006 and then as Director of the Pedagogical Research Center in Kinshasa and Secretary of the Scheutists' Provincial Commission for Finance from 2003 to 2007. He then returned to academic pursuits and earned a bachelor's degree in civil law from the Notre Dame de la Paix University in Namur in 2009, a master's in civil law from the Catholic University of Louvain-la-Neuve (Note: His Louvain thesis was "L'exécution de bonne foi des contrats de droit privé – Une approche comparée des droits belge et français – Un regard sur le droit congolais", Faculté de droit et de criminologie, 2011) and master's in human rights at the Saint Louis Faculty of Law in Brussels in 2011. Returning to Kinshasa, he was Provincial Councilor of the CICM in Kinshasa from 2013 to 2016. The next year he was the African Delegate on the committee preparing for the CICM General Chapter and then the delegate of the Kinshasa Province to that meeting in 2017.

From 2017 to 2020 Ntambue was one of the General Councillors of the CICM Missionaries, based in Rome.

Ntambue was appointed Bishop of Kabinda on 23 July 2020 by Pope Francis. On 27 September 2020, he received his episcopal consecration from Ernest Ngboko Ngombe, Archbishop of Mbandaka-Bikoro and was installed as bishop. On 21 December 2022 he was appointed apostolic administrator of the archdiocese of Kananga.

On 19 March 2024, Pope Francis named him archbishop of Kananga. He was installed there on 19 May.
