= Godefroid Mukeng'a Kalond =

Congolese Roman Catholic archbishop (1930–2026)

The Most Reverend Godefroid Mukeng’a Kalond C.I.C.M.
- Archbishop Emeritus of Kananga
- Church: Catholic Church
- Archdiocese: Kananga
- Province: Kananga
- Appointed: 3 March 1997
- Term ended: 3 May 2006
- Predecessor: Martin-Léonard Bakole wa Ilunga
- Successor: Marcel Madila Basanguka
- Other post: Bishop of Luiza (1971–1997)

Orders
- Ordination: 2 March 1958
- Consecration: 5 December 1971 by Agnelo Rossi, Martin-Léonard Bakole wa Ilunga and François Kabangu wa Mutela

Personal details
- Born: 31 August 1930 Tshibingu-Mukese, Belgian Congo
- Died: 14 May 2026 (aged 95) Kinshasa, Democratic Republic of the Congo

Godefroid Mukeng’a Kalond C.I.C.M. (31 August 1930 – 14 May 2026) was a Congolese Roman Catholic prelate, who served as Bishop of Luiza from 1971 to 1997 and as Archbishop of Kananga from 1997 until his retirement in 2006. He was the first indigenous member of the Congregation of the Immaculate Heart of Mary (Scheut Missionaries) in the Democratic Republic of the Congo.

== Early life and priesthood ==
Mukeng’a Kalond was born on 31 August 1930 in Tshibingu-Mukese in what was then the Belgian Congo. He joined the Congregation of the Immaculate Heart of Mary and was ordained a priest on 2 March 1958.

== Episcopal ministry ==
On 30 August 1971, Pope Paul VI appointed him Bishop of Luiza. He received episcopal consecration on 5 December 1971 by Cardinal Agnelo Rossi.

After more than 25 years leading the Diocese of Luiza, he was appointed Archbishop of Kananga on 3 March 1997.

In 2003, Mukeng’a Kalond joined a high-level Congolese Catholic delegation to Canada led by Cardinal Frédéric Etsou-Nzabi-Bamungwabi to seek international support as the Democratic Republic of the Congo transitioned from the Second Congo War towards lasting peace and democratic governance. The delegation included senior church figures and underscored the Catholic Church's role in advocating for peace and humanitarian assistance.

In 2005 he participated in an international convention at the Vatican marking the 40th anniversary of the Second Vatican Council decree Ad Gentes, emphasizing the growing missionary responsibility of African clergy.

== Retirement ==
Pope Benedict XVI accepted his resignation on 3 May 2006 upon reaching the canonical retirement age.

== Later life and death ==
In August 2025, celebrations were held in Kinshasa marking his 95th birthday, recognizing him as the first Black Scheutist priest and honoring his long ecclesiastical service.

Mukeng'a Kalond died in Kinshasa on 14 May 2026, at the age of 95.

Catholic Church titles
Preceded by Martin-Léonard Bakole wa Ilunga	Archbishop of Kananga; 1997–2006	Succeeded by Marcel Madila Basanguka
Preceded by Bernard Mels	Bishop of Luiza; 1971–1997	Succeeded by Léonard Kasanda Lumembu
