= Gérard Mulumba Kalemba =

Congolese bishop (1937–2020)

- Bishop of Mweka
- Church: Catholic Church
- Diocese: Diocese of Mweka
- In office: 19 January 1989 – 18 February 2017
- Predecessor: Marcel Evariste Van Rengen
- Successor: Oscar Nkolo Kanowa

Orders
- Ordination: 20 August 1967
- Consecration: 9 July 1989 by Joseph Ngogi Nkongolo

Personal details
- Born: 8 July 1937 Kananga, Kasaï Province, Belgian Congo, Belgian Empire
- Died: 15 April 2020 (aged 82) Kinshasa, Democratic Republic of the Congo

Gérard Mulumba Kalemba (8 July 1937 – 15 April 2020) was a Congolese prelate of the Catholic Church.

Born in Kananga, Mulumba Kalemba was ordained to the priesthood in 1967. He was appointed bishop of Mweka in 1989, serving until his retirement in 2017. His brother, Étienne Tshisekedi, and nephew, Félix Tshisekedi, both served as President of the Democratic Republic of the Congo.

On 15 April 2020, during the DR Congo coronavirus pandemic, Mulumba Kalemba died due to COVID-19 in Kinshasa. He was 82.
