= Demba, Democratic Republic of the Congo =

Demba
- Commune
- Location in the Democratic Republic of the Congo
- Coordinates: 5°30′S 22°16′E
- Country: DR Congo
- Province: Kasai-Central
- Territory: Demba

Population (2009)
  - Total: 25,384
- Time zone: UTC+2 (Central Africa Time)
- Climate: Aw

Demba is a town in Kasai-Central province in the southern part of the Democratic Republic of the Congo. As of 2009 it had an estimated population of 25,384.

== Transport ==
Demba is served by the national railway system.

== See also ==
- Railway stations in DRCongo
