= Mweka, Democratic Republic of the Congo =

Coordinates: 04°51′0″S 21°34′00″E

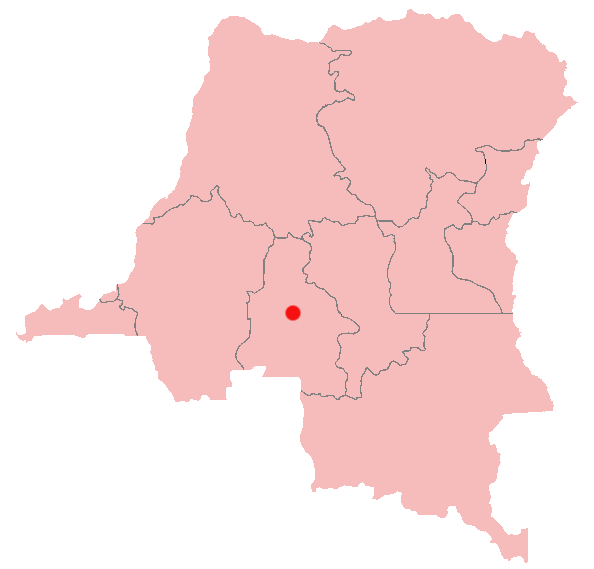
Location of Mweka in the Democratic Republic of the Congo

Mweka is a town in southern-central Democratic Republic of the Congo, situated on the Kasai railway line between Kananga (250 km away) and the Kasai River port of Ilebo (172 km away).

Mweka is also the headquarters of the Territoire de Mweka (administrative district which is one of the territories of the Democratic Republic of the Congo ) of the present Kasai Province.

Its cathedral is the episcopal see of the Roman Catholic Diocese of Mweka.

== Transport ==
When the rail connection to the Katanga line is functioning, trains reach Lubumbashi, 1,406 km to the south-east of Mweka. The train/boat journey in the other direction from Mweka via Ilebo to the capital, Kinshasa is about 1,000 km. Although "remote" is the default international media description for any DR Congo town outside Kinshasa, Mweka is relatively accessible by the standards of the country. Mweka Airport is 372 nm (690 km) east of Kinshasa.

=== Accident ===
In early August 2007, a freight train crash near Mweka killed about 100 people who had been riding illegally on the wagons.

== Epidemic ==
Beginning in late August 2007, the Territoire de Mweka was the site of an outbreak of Ebola hemorrhagic fever, which had killed more than 100 people by August 30, including all those who attended the funerals of two village chiefs.

== See also ==
- Ebola
- Universal precautions
- Needle remover
- Sharps waste
- VHFs
- Railway stations in DRCongo
- Roman Catholic Diocese of Mweka
