= Diocese of Luiza =

Roman Catholic diocese in the Democratic Republic of the Congo

Diocese of Luiza Dioecesis Ludovicanus

Location
- Country: Democratic Republic of the Congo
- Metropolitan: Kananga

Statistics
- Area: 21,777 km^{2} (8,408 sq mi)
- Population: Total; Catholics: (as of 2022); 1,230,000; 738,000 (60.0%)

Information
- Sui iuris church: Latin Church
- Rite: Roman Rite

Current leadership
- Pope: Leo XIV
- Bishop: Félicien Mwanama Galumbulula
- Bishops emeritus: Léonard Kasanda Lumembu

The Roman Catholic Diocese of Luiza (Latin: Ludovican(us)) is a diocese located in the territory of Luiza in the ecclesiastical province of Kananga in the Democratic Republic of the Congo.

On January 3, 2014, Pope Francis accepted the resignation of Luiza's bishop, Léonard Kasanda Lumembu and appointed his successor Félicien Mwanama Galumbulula, a former university professor who was second secretary of the Episcopal Conference of the Democratic Republic of the Congo (CENCO) from 2008 to 2014. He was installed on March 23, 2014.

== History ==
- September 26, 1967: Established as the Diocese of Luiza from the Metropolitan Archdiocese of Luluabourg
- March 25, 2022: Lost territory to establish the Diocese of Tshilomba

== Leadership ==
Bishops of Luiza

- Archbishop (personal title) Bernard Mels, C.I.C.M. (September 26, 1967 – October 3, 1970)
- Bishop Godefroid Mukeng'a Kalond, C.I.C.M. (August 30, 1971 – March 3, 1997), appointed Archbishop of Kananga
- Bishop Léonard Kasanda Lumembu, C.I.C.M. (April 3, 1998 – January 3, 2014)
- Bishop Félicien Mwanama Galumbulula (January 3, 2014 – present)

== See also ==
- Roman Catholicism in the Democratic Republic of the Congo
