= Utimmira =

Africa Proconsularis (125 AD)

Utimmira was an ancient Roman town of the Roman province of Africa Proconsularis. The town was somewhere near Carthage in today's Tunisia, but the exact location has been lost to history.

Utimmira was the seat of an ancient episcopal see, suffragan of Archdiocese of Carthage. Only two bishops attributed to this diocese: the Catholic Severus, who intervened at the Council of Carthage (411) and Bishop Reparatus, who took part in the Council of Carthage (484) called by the Vandal king Huneric, after which Reparatus was exiled to Corsica. Today Utimmira survives as titular bishop, the current bishop is Edouard Isango Nkoyo, of Republic Democratic of Congo.

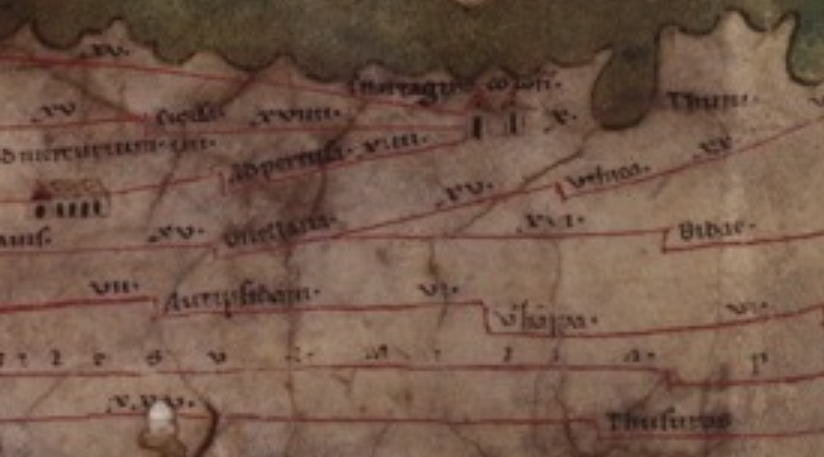
Extract of the Tabula Peutingeriana, showing Roman North Africa near Utimmira during the 4th century
