= Diocese of Luebo =

Roman Catholic diocese in the Democratic Republic of the Congo

Diocese of Luebo Dioecesis Lueboensis
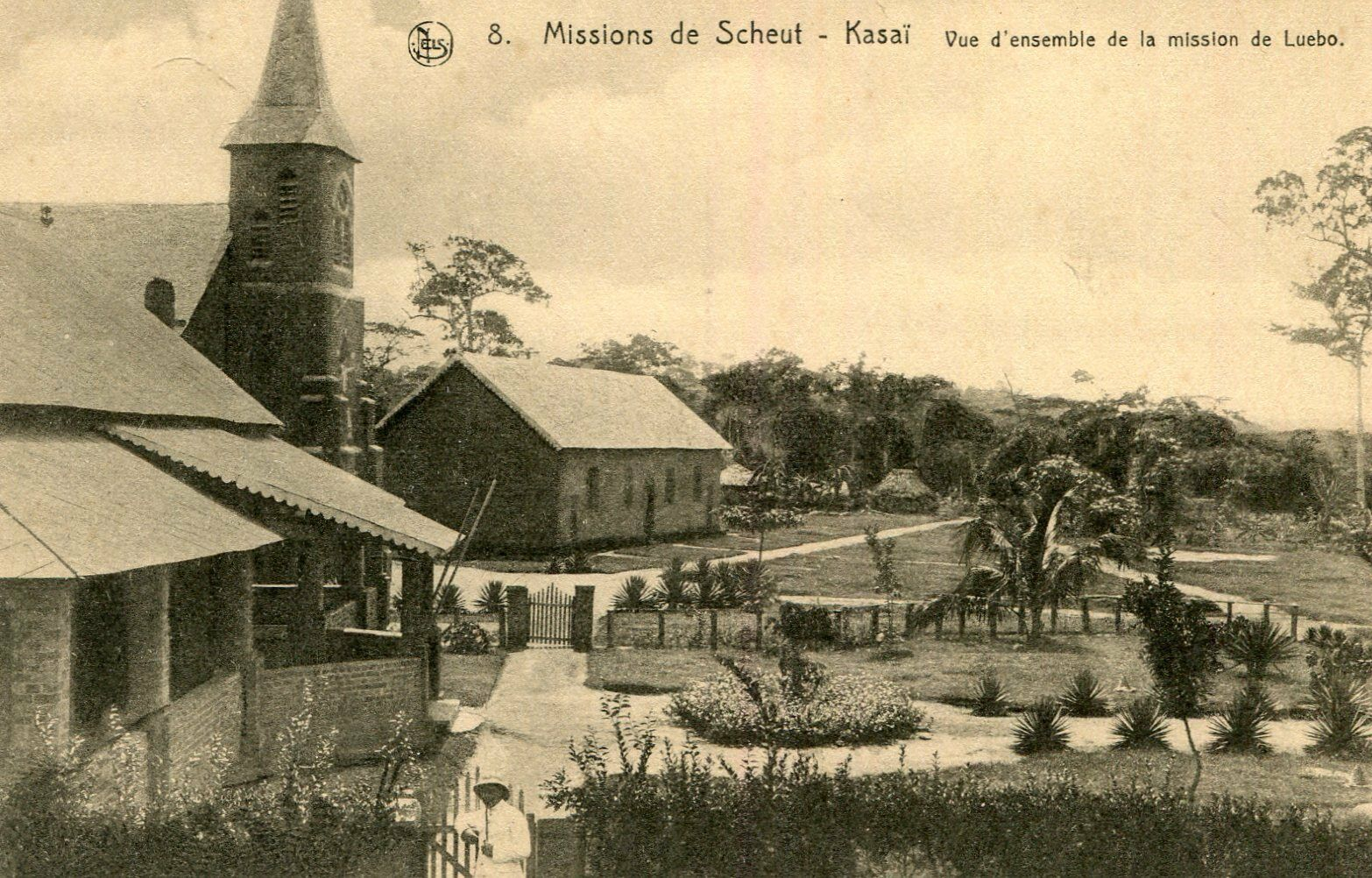

Location
- Country: Democratic Republic of the Congo
- Metropolitan: Kananga

Statistics
- Area: 32,000 km^{2} (12,000 sq mi)
- Population: Total; Catholics: (as of 2002); 2,000,000; 1,200,000 (60.0%)

Information
- Rite: Latin Rite

Current leadership
- Pope: Leo XIV
- Bishop: Pierre-Célestin Tshitoko Mamba
- Bishops emeritus: Emery Kabongo Kanundowi

The Roman Catholic Diocese of Luebo (Latin: Lueboën(sis)) is a suffragan diocese in the ecclesiastical province of Kananga in the Democratic Republic of the Congo.

Its cathedral episcopal see is Cathédrale Saint-Jean-Baptiste (dedicated to John the Baptist), and it has a former cathedral: Cathédrale Sacré-Coeur (dedicated to the Sacred Heart), also in the city of Luebo.

== History ==
- Established on 25 April 1959 as Apostolic Vicariate of Luebo, on territory split off from the Apostolic Vicariate of Luluabourg
- 10 November 1959: Promoted as Diocese of Luebo
- On 26 September 1967, it gained territory from the Metropolitan Archdiocese of Luluabourg

== Episcopal ordinaries ==
(all Latin Rite)

Apostolic Vicar of Luebo

- Joseph Ngogi Nkongolo (25 April 1959 – 10 November 1959 see below), Titular Bishop of Lebedus (25 April 1959 – 10 November 1959)

Suffragan Bishops of Luebo

- Joseph Ngogi Nkongolo (see above 10 November 1959 – 3 May 1966), also Apostolic Administrator of the then Apostolic Administration of Mbuji-Mayi (Congo-Kinshasa) (1963 – 3 May 1966), promoted Bishop of the same Mbujimayi (3 May 1966 – 1991)
- François Kabangu wa Mutela (26 September 1967 – 10 December 1987)
- Archbishop (personal title) Emery Kabongo Kanundowi (10 December 1987 – 14 August 2003), also Apostolic Administrator of Mweka (Congo-Kinshasa) (1988 – 19 January 1989); previously Second private Secretary of Pope John Paul II (1982- 10 December 1987 ) (first African to hold such post)
- Pierre-Célestin Tshitoko Mamba (since 7 January 2006)

== See also ==
- Roman Catholicism in the Democratic Republic of the Congo

== Sources and external links ==
- GCatholic.org with incumbent biography links
- Catholic Hierarchy
