= Mweka Territory =

Coordinates: 4°30′S 21°39′E

Mweka
- Territory
- Interactive map of Mweka
- Country: DR Congo
- Province: Kasaï
- Time zone: UTC+2 (CAT)

Mweka is a territory in Kasai province of the Democratic Republic of the Congo. The territory contains the town of Mweka, Democratic Republic of the Congo, and the towns of Bulape, Kakenge and Tshimpumpu. It also contains the chiefdom of Bakuba (see Chiefdoms and sectors of the Democratic Republic of the Congo).

In 2025 Mweka Territory contains 4 health zones including Mweka health zone, Bulape health zone, Kakenge health zone and Mushenge health zone.
