= Archdiocese of Kananga =

Roman Catholic archdiocese in the Democratic Republic of the Congo

Coordinates: 6.4130°S 22.0295°E

Archdiocese of Kananga Archidioecesis Kanangana Archidiocèse de Kananga

Location
- Country: Democratic Republic of the Congo
- Headquarters: Kananga, Kasaï-Central, Democratic Republic of the Congo

Statistics
- Area: 33,000 km^{2} (13,000 sq mi)
- Population: Total; Catholics: (as of 2022); 4,532,000; 2,703,000 (59.6%)
- Parishes: 60

Information
- Denomination: Catholic Church
- Sui iuris church: Latin Church
- Rite: Roman Rite
- Established: 18 March 1904; 122 years ago
- Secular priests: 152 (114 Diocesan, 38 Religious Orders)

Current leadership
- Pope: Leo XIV
- Metropolitan Archbishop: Félicien Ntambue Kasembe, C.I.C.M.
- Bishops emeritus: Marcel Madila Basanguka

The Roman Catholic Archdiocese of Kananga (Latin: Archidioecesis Kanangana) is the Metropolitan See for the ecclesiastical province of Kananga in the Democratic Republic of the Congo. The episcopal cathedral is the Cathédrale Saint Joseph Mikalayi in Kazumba. The Pro-cathédrale Saint Clément is in Kananga.

== History ==
In November 1891, Père Emeri Cambier arrived at Luluabourg and established a mission. Other mission stations were subsequently founded at St-Trudon de Lusambo, St-Victorien at Bena Makima, St-Antoine de Lusambo, and elsewhere. A hospital was established, as well as, schools and orphanages. The prefecture was served by members of the Congregation of the Immaculate Heart of Mary of Scheut (Brussels), and by Sisters of Charity of Jesus and Mary from Ghent.

Prior to 1901, the area was part of the Apostolic Vicariate of Belgian Congo. Begun as a simple mission, on 20 August 1901 it was detached from the vicariate on 26 July 1901 and established as the Mission sui iuris of Upper Kassai (French: Kasaï Supérieur). In 1904 it became the Apostolic Prefecture of Upper Kassai. Cambier was named Prefect Apostolic and was based at the mission of St. Joseph de Luluabourg, a few miles south of the Belgian station of Luluabourg. At the time of its creation, it comprised almost all the Lualaba-Kassai district. The King of Belgium later named Cambier an officer of the Royal Order of the Lion in recognition of his services in South Africa.

In 1908 the prefecture was enlarged by extending its boundaries on the east to the left bank of the Lualaba. The languages used were those of the Bena Lulua, the Baluba, Bena Kanioka, the Batetela, the Bakuba, the Bakete, and the Balunda.

On 13 June 1917, the prefecture became the Apostolic Vicariate of Upper Kasai, hence entitled to a titular bishop The vicariate repeatedly lost territory with the creation of the Apostolic Prefecture of Lulua Katanga (1922), the Apostolic Prefecture of Tshumbe (1936), and the Apostolic Prefecture of Ipamu (1937). Around 1926, Bishop Auguste Declercq established a program to train catechists. The name of the catechist in the local dialect is “mulami,” which means “guardian, shepherd.” On 10 March 1949 it was renamed the "Apostolic Vicariate of Luluabourg".

In March 1953 the vicariate lost territory to establish both the Apostolic Vicariate of Kabinda and the Apostolic Prefecture of Mweka. In April 1959, it lost territory to establish the Apostolic Vicariate of Luebo. On 10 November 1959 the Apostolic Vicariate of Upper Kasai was raised to the Metropolitan Archdiocese of Luluabourg. In November 1963, it ceded territory to establish the then Apostolic Administration of Mbuji-Mayi.

In September 1967, it transferred territory to the Diocese of Luebo (as transfer), and established the Diocese of Luiza On 14 June 1972 the archdiocese was renamed as the Metropolitan Archdiocese of Kananga.

== Province ==
Its ecclesiastical province comprises the Metropolitan's own Archdiocese and the following Suffragan dioceses:

- Roman Catholic Diocese of Kabinda
- Roman Catholic Diocese of Kole
- Roman Catholic Diocese of Luebo
- Roman Catholic Diocese of Luiza
- Roman Catholic Diocese of Mbujimayi
- Roman Catholic Diocese of Mweka
- Roman Catholic Diocese of Tshilomba
- Roman Catholic Diocese of Tshumbe

== Present day ==
In February 2017, the seminary of Malole in Kananga was damaged by arson. In 2018, three convents in the Congo were attacked and robbed by armed men.

The Petit Séminaire Saint-Pie X is in Kabinda. St. Antoine Chapel in the village of Demba is named in honor of St. Anthony Parish in Davenport, Iowa which provided the funds to build the chapel in response to Pope Francis’ request to establish a permanent memorial of the Year of Mercy.

== Leadership ==
Apostolic Prefect of Upper Kasai

- Émeri-Henri-Célestin Cambier, C.I.C.M. (1904 – 1917), resigned

Apostolic Vicars of Upper Kasai

- Auguste Declercq, C.I.C.M. (24 August 1918 – 29 October 1938), resigned
- Louis-Georges-Firmin Demol, C.I.C.M. (29 October 1938 – December 1947), resigned

Apostolic Vicar of Luluabourg

- Bernard Mels, C.I.C.M. (10 March 1949 – 10 November 1959 see below)

Metropolitan Archbishops of Luluabourg

- Bernard Mels, C.I.C.M. (see above 10 November 1959 – 26 September 1967), appointed (Arch)Bishop of Luiza
- Martin-Léonard Bakole wa Ilunga (26 September 1967 – 14 June 1972 see below)

Metropolitan Archbishops of Kananga

- Martin-Léonard Bakole wa Ilunga (see above 14 June 1972 – 3 March 1997), retired
- Godefroid Mukeng'a Kalond, C.I.C.M. (3 March 1997 – 3 May 2006), retired
- Marcel Madila Basanguka (9 December 2006 – 21 December 2022), resigned
  - Apostolic Administrator Félicien Ntambue Kasembe (21 December 2022 – 19 March 2024)
- Félicien Ntambue Kasembe (19 March 2024 – Present)

=== Coadjutor vicar apostolic ===
- Louis-Georges-Firmin Demol, C.I.C.M. (1936-1938)

=== Auxiliary bishops ===
- Martin-Léonard Bakole wa Ilunga (1966-1967), appointed Archbishop here
- Marcel Madila Basanguka (2004-2006), appointed Archbishop here

=== Other priests of this diocese who became bishop ===
- Emery Kabongo Kanundowi (1969-1987), appointed (Arch)Bishop of Luebo in 1987
- Pierre-Célestin Tshitoko Mamba (1982-2006), appointed Bishop of Luebo in 2006

== See also ==
- Roman Catholicism in the Democratic Republic of the Congo
