= Kabinda =

- Provincial capital and city
- Ville de Kabinda
- Location in the Democratic Republic of the Congo
- Coordinates: 6°07′48″S 24°28′48″E
- Country: DR Congo
- Province: Lomami
- Communes: Kabondo, Kabuelabuela, Kajiba, Mudingayi

Government
  - Mayor: Anne Marie Tshiabu

Area
  - City: 27 km^{2} (10 sq mi)
- Elevation: 845 m (2,772 ft)

Population (2023)
  - City: 572,000
  - Density: 21,000/km^{2} (55,000/sq mi)
- Time zone: UTC+2 (Central Africa Time)
- Climate: Aw

Kabinda is the capital city of Lomami Province in the Democratic Republic of the Congo. Projected to be the second fastest growing African continent city between 2020 and 2025, with a 6.37% growth.

== Geography ==
Kabinda is served by Tunta Airport. It has 572,000 inhabitants as of 2023. The city is part of the Roman Catholic Diocese of Kabinda.

== Second Congo War ==
During the Second Congo War Kabinda was devastated by fighting between Congolese forces and Rwandan rebels, who were advancing west on their way to the diamond producing area around Mbuji-Mayi. The town was surrounded and besieged by the Rwandans for two years, however it remained under government control.
