= Luebo =

- Commune
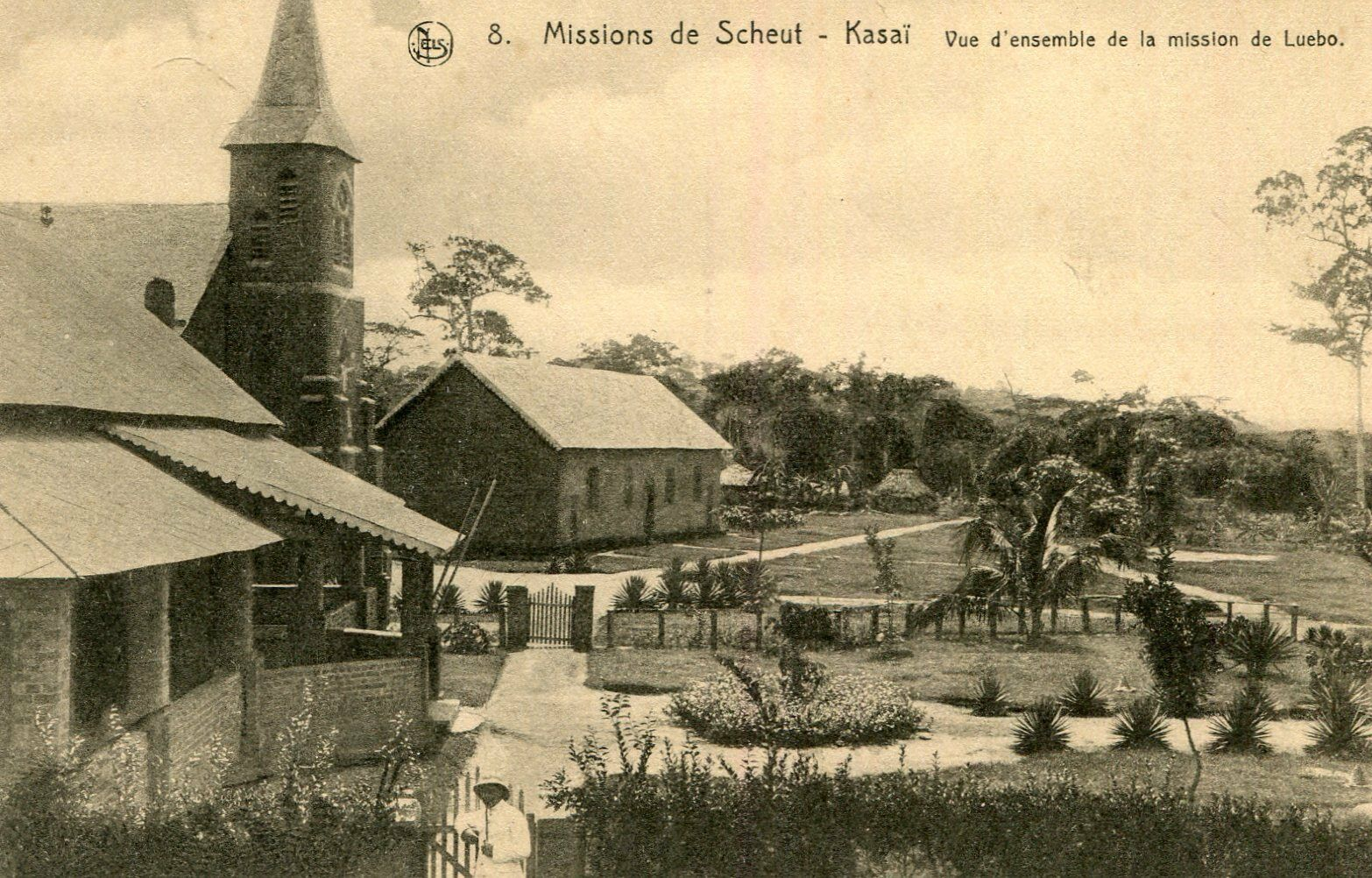
- Luebo Mission

- Location in the Democratic Republic of the Congo
- Coordinates: 5°21′S 21°25′E
- Country: DR Congo
- Province: Kasai
- Territory: Luebo

Population (2009)
  - Total: 40,115
- Time zone: UTC+2 (Central Africa Time)

Luebo or Lwebo is a town (officially a commune) of Kasai Province in south-central Democratic Republic of the Congo. It is also the seat of the territory of the same name. As of 2009 it had an estimated population of 40,115.

== History ==
The town was founded in November 1885 by Ludwig Wolf and a group of other European colonists as an outpost of King Leopold II of Belgium's Congo Free State. The state used this outpost to claim the surrounding region, despite it already being inhabited, notably by the nearby Kuba Kingdom. The trading post was sold to the Sanford Exploring Expedition, an American company, in December 1886, and it was sold again to 1888 to the Société anonyme belge pour le commerce du Haut-Congo. A mission was founded in the town three years later, by William Henry Sheppard and Samuel Lapsley. In 1904 it again became property of the Congo Free State. In 1908, it was incorporated into the Belgian Congo.

A bridge over the Lulua River opened in the town in the late 1950s, shortly before the Democratic Republic of the Congo gained its independence.

== Transport ==
The town is on the N20 highway, and is served by Luebo Airport.

== Climate ==
Climate data for Luebo, elevation 420 m (1,380 ft), (1971–2000)
Month	Jan	Feb	Mar	Apr	May	Jun	Jul	Aug	Sep	Oct	Nov	Dec	Year
Mean daily maximum °C (°F)	30.2 (86.4)	30.4 (86.7)	30.7 (87.3)	30.5 (86.9)	30.6 (87.1)	30.2 (86.4)	29.7 (85.5)	30.4 (86.7)	30.6 (87.1)	30.4 (86.7)	30.2 (86.4)	30.0 (86.0)	30.3 (86.6)
Mean daily minimum °C (°F)	21.1 (70.0)	21.1 (70.0)	21.3 (70.3)	21.3 (70.3)	21.8 (71.2)	19.8 (67.6)	19.4 (66.9)	20.0 (68.0)	20.4 (68.7)	20.8 (69.4)	20.9 (69.6)	21.2 (70.2)	20.8 (69.4)
Average precipitation mm (inches)	161.0 (6.34)	130.0 (5.12)	191.0 (7.52)	221.0 (8.70)	117.0 (4.61)	15.0 (0.59)	18.0 (0.71)	52.0 (2.05)	160.0 (6.30)	212.0 (8.35)	247.0 (9.72)	205.0 (8.07)	1,729 (68.08)
Source: FAO

== See also ==
- Roman Catholic Diocese of Luebo
