= Kananga =

City in the Democratic Republic of the Congo

- Provincial capital and city
- Ville de Kananga
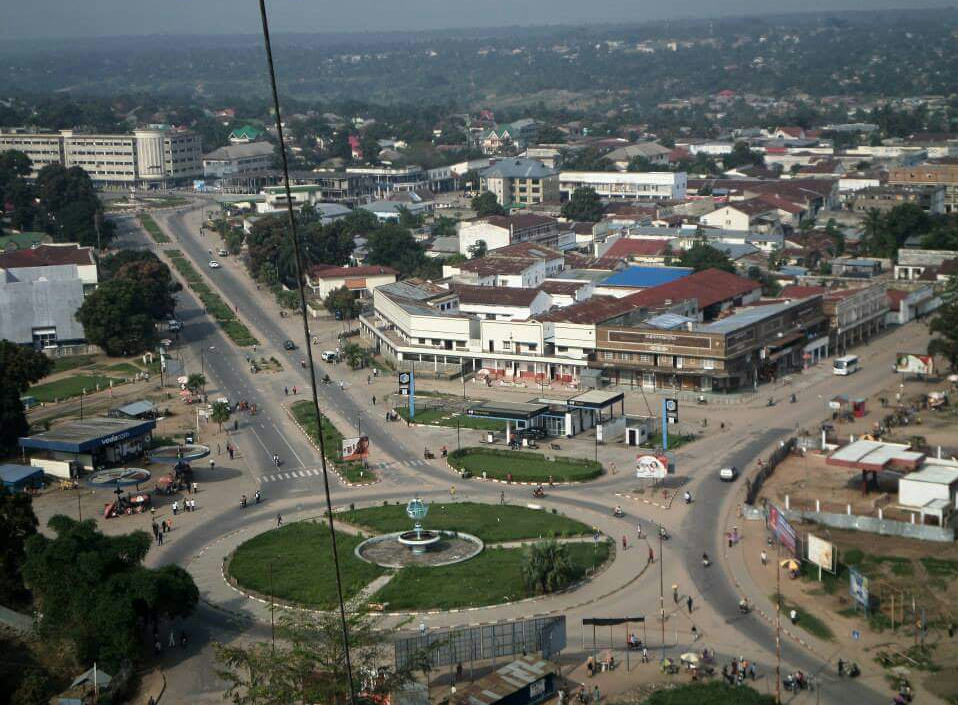
- Kananga, 2016

- Location in Democratic Republic of the Congo
- Coordinates: 5°53′32″S 22°24′10″E
- Country: DR Congo
- Province: Kasai-Central
- Founded: 1884
- City status: 1958
- Communes: Kananga, Katoka, Lukonga, Ndesha, Nganza

Government
  - Mayor: Rose Muadi

Area
  - City: 743 km^{2} (287 sq mi)
- Elevation: 608 m (1,995 ft)

Population (2015)
  - City: 1,271,704
  - Density: 1,710/km^{2} (4,430/sq mi)
  - Urban: 1,170,000
  - Ethnicities: Bena-Lulua • Luba-Kasaï (Baluba) • Basalampasu/Baluntu • Bakete • Bashilele • Bakuba • Chokwe
- Time zone: UTC+2 (Central Africa Time)
- Climate: Aw
- National language: Tshiluba

Kananga, formerly known as Luluabourg or Luluaburg, is the capital city of the Kasai-Central Province in the Democratic Republic of the Congo and was the capital of the former Kasaï-Occidental Province. It is the fourth most populous urban area in the country, with an estimated population of 1,524,000 in 2021.

The city lies near the Lulua River, a tributary of the Kasai River and the Ilebo-Lubumbashi railway. An important commercial and administrative centre, it is home to a museum and to Kananga Airport.

== History ==
German explorer Hermann Wissmann established a station in the area around present-day Kananga, on the left bank of the Lulua. Wissmann named the station Malandji, a name suggested by his 400 carriers, who were from the city of Malanje in Angola. Later on, with the construction of the railway on the other bank of the river, the station was moved, and the Lulua train station gave its name to the new town, namely Luluabourg. The old location is named Malandji-Makulu (old Malandji) to this day.

At the Belgo-Congolese Round Table Conference, in 1960, the name given to the negotiations for the independence of the then-Belgian Congo, a decision was taken that the new state would move the location of its capital from Kinshasa to Luluabourg, due to the latter's central location. However, due to multiple political setbacks, and particularly the secession attempt by Albert Kalonji and his South Kasai, this decision was never implemented. When the central government reconquered South Kasai in 1962, Luluabourg became the capital of the new Kasai-Occidental province. Kananga (as Luluabourg) was the site of the drafting of the first Congolese-written constitution for the Democratic Republic of the Congo, in 1964.

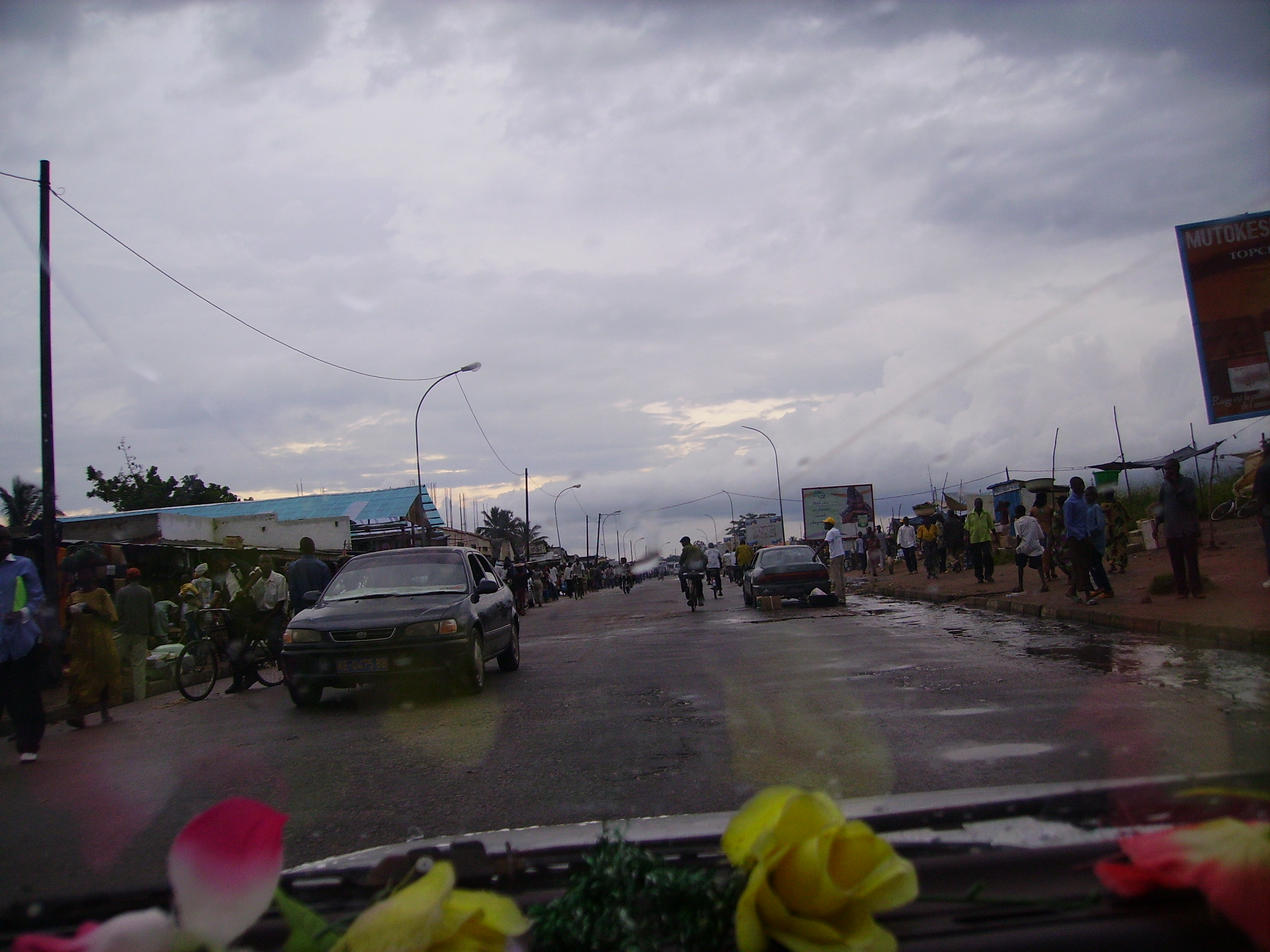
Street view of Kananga

In 1966, during an Africanization campaign, Mobutu Sese Seko renamed a number of cities and towns that bore European names. Leopoldville became Kinshasa, and Luluabourg became Kananga. The name Kananga derives from the Tshiluba word kanangayi meaning "a place for peace or love" as what is now central Kananga was a gathering place for pre-colonial chiefs to discuss treaties and to settle disputes.

Under the 2006 constitution, the Democratic republic of the Congo was divided in 25 provinces, and one national capital city (Kinshasa). The Kasai-Occidental was divided into two provinces. Kananga became the capital of the Lulua Province.

Locally, Kananga is known as Kananga-Malandji, or even Kananga-Malandji wa Nshinga. Nshinga, or cables, stands for the large high-voltage cables of the Inga-Shaba project, that cross the skies of Kananga, and that link Kolwezi and the Lualaba Province to the Inga Dam in Bas-Congo.

The city came into headlines within the Orthodox community in 2018, especially in Greece, when a documentary film called "Kananga" was produced, talking about the minority Orthodox Christian population in the city, and the Cathedral of Saint Andrew, which is the largest Eastern Orthodox church in Africa.

== Climate ==
Kananga has a tropical savanna climate (Köppen Aw), fairly typical of the western Democratic Republic of Congo, with a dry season entered upon June and July and a lengthy though not intense wet season from September to May.

Climate data for Kananga, elevation 657 m (2,156 ft), (1971–2000)
Month	Jan	Feb	Mar	Apr	May	Jun	Jul	Aug	Sep	Oct	Nov	Dec	Year
Mean daily maximum °C (°F)	29.4 (84.9)	29.6 (85.3)	30.0 (86.0)	30.2 (86.4)	31.4 (88.5)	30.9 (87.6)	30.5 (86.9)	29.9 (85.8)	29.8 (85.6)	29.6 (85.3)	29.1 (84.4)	29.0 (84.2)	30.0 (85.9)
Mean daily minimum °C (°F)	19.8 (67.6)	19.8 (67.6)	19.8 (67.6)	20.0 (68.0)	19.8 (67.6)	18.5 (65.3)	17.8 (64.0)	18.8 (65.8)	19.3 (66.7)	19.2 (66.6)	19.5 (67.1)	19.8 (67.6)	19.3 (66.8)
Average precipitation mm (inches)	156.0 (6.14)	134.0 (5.28)	197.0 (7.76)	204.0 (8.03)	90.0 (3.54)	26.0 (1.02)	10.0 (0.39)	44.0 (1.73)	125.0 (4.92)	163.0 (6.42)	249.0 (9.80)	223.0 (8.78)	1,621 (63.81)
Average relative humidity (%)	85	84	83	83	72	71	74	79	82	81	83	84	80
Source: FAO

== Rail accidents ==
- 1 August 2007 – A railway accident 100 miles west of Kananga town, caused by a brake failure, resulted in 100 fatalities.
- 29 November 2005 – People riding on roofs swept off by low beam of bridge.

== See also ==
- Railway stations in DRCongo
