= African sculpture =

Rarely conserved bronze and wooden figures and wooden masks

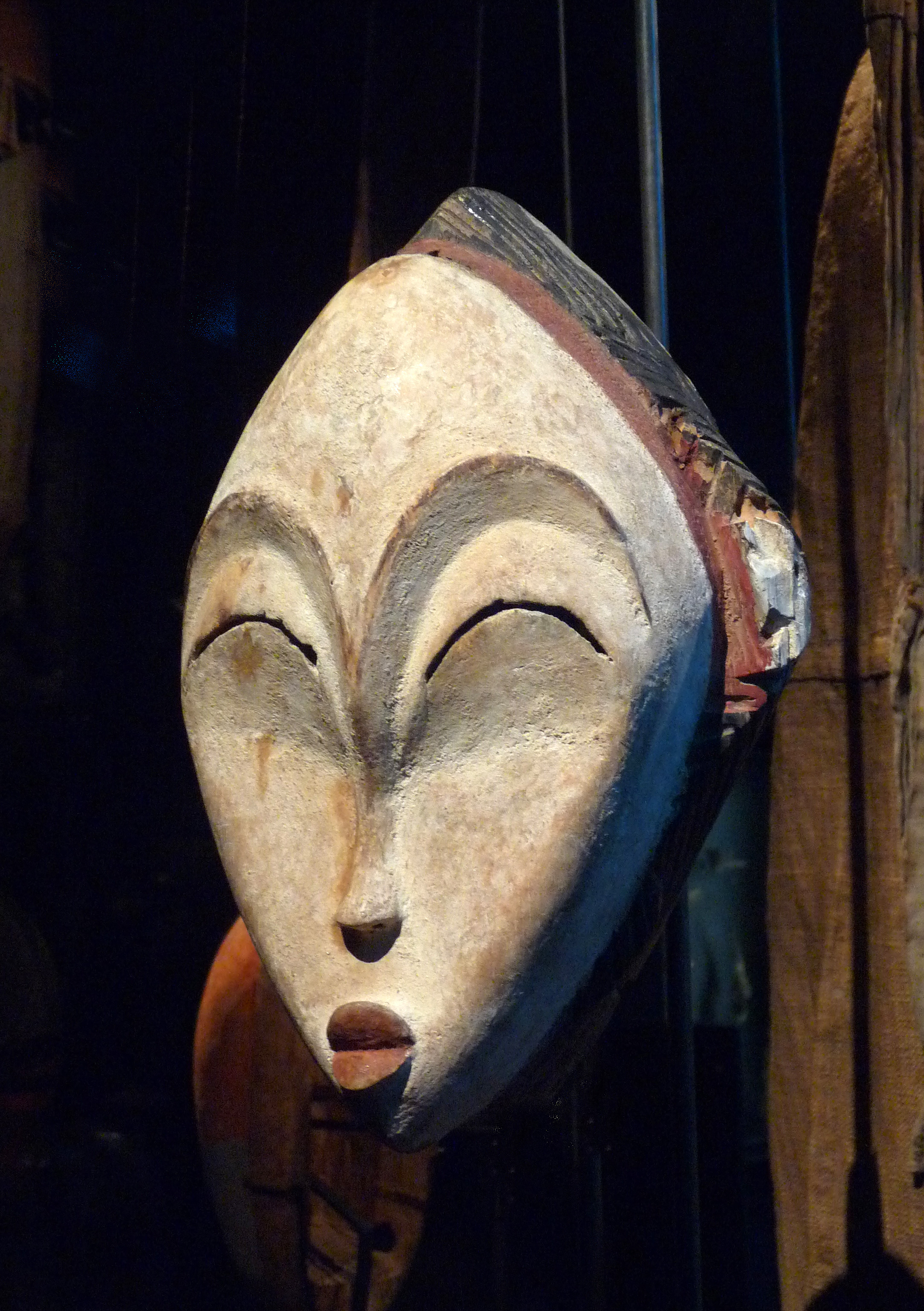
Mask from Gabon

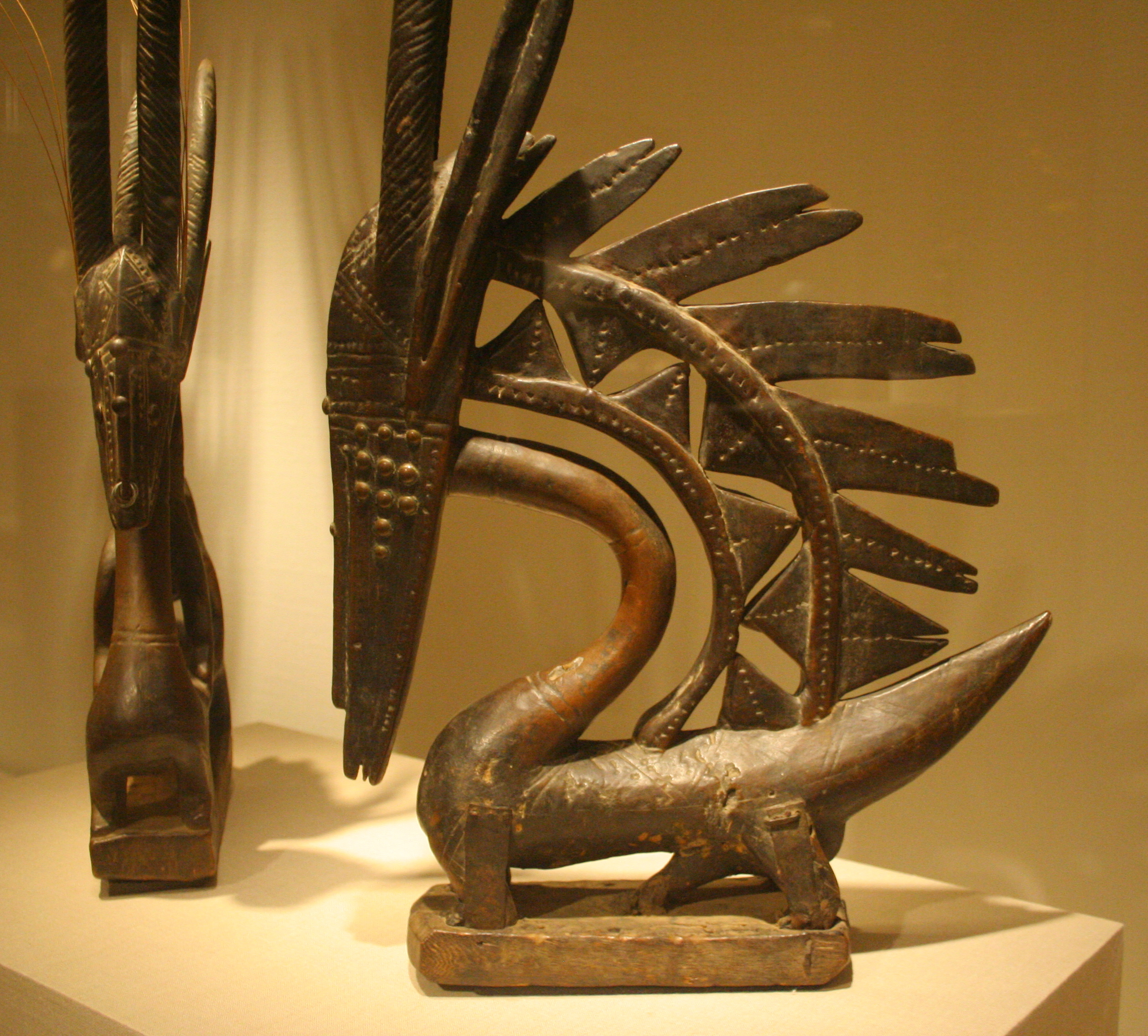
Two Chiwara c. late 19th early 20th centuries, Art Institute of Chicago. Female (left) and male, vertical styles

Most African sculpture from regions south of the Sahara was historically made of wood and other organic materials that have not survived from earlier than a few centuries ago, while older pottery figures are found from a number of areas. A notable exception is the Farmingdale Statue, a wooden figure attributed to the Zulu or another Nguni group of southeastern Africa, radiocarbon dated to approximately A.D. 1630 and described as one of fewer than a dozen wooden artefacts known to have been collected from sub-Saharan Africa before 1650. Masks have been important elements in the cultural traditions of many peoples, along with human figures, often highly stylized. There is a vast variety of styles, often varying within the same context of origin and depending on the use of the object. Wider regional trends are apparent, and sculpture is most common among "groups of settled cultivators in the areas drained by the Niger and Congo rivers" in West Africa.

Direct images of African deities are relatively infrequent, but masks in particular are or were often made for traditional African religious ceremonies. Since the latter half of the 20th century, there are also several styles of modern African sculpture, while many sculptures are made for tourists. African masks were an influence on European Modernist art, which was inspired by their lack of concern for naturalistic depiction.

== By region ==
In West Africa, the earliest known sculptures are from the Nok culture which thrived between 500 BC and 500 AD in modern Nigeria, with clay figures typically with elongated bodies and angular shapes. Later West African cultures developed bronze casting for reliefs to decorate palaces like the famous Benin Bronzes, and very fine naturalistic royal heads from around the Yoruba town of Ife in terracotta and metal from the 12th to the 14th centuries. Akan goldweights are a form of small metal sculptures produced over the period 1400–1900, some apparently representing proverbs and so with a narrative element rare in African sculpture, and royal regalia included impressive gold sculptured elements.

Many West African figures are used in religious rituals and are often coated with materials placed on them for ceremonial offerings. The Mande-speaking peoples of the same region make pieces of wood with broad, flat surfaces and arms and legs are shaped like cylinders. In Central Africa, however, the main distinguishing characteristics include heart-shaped faces that are curved inward and display patterns of circles and dots.

Sculpture from East Africa has been collected mainly from the Bongo people in southern Sudan, in Ethiopia and Tanzania. The exhibitions Tanzania. Masterworks of African Sculpture (1994) and Shangaa. Art of Tanzania (2013) presented hundreds of masks and other sculptures from ethnic groups in that country. Makonde masks from Mozambique and Tanzania have been used in ritual dance and initiation ceremonies. East African pole sculptures, carved in elongated human shapes and decorated with geometric forms, while the tops may also be carved with figures of animals, represent abstract human figures or other objects. In traditional ways, such poles of the Bongo people were placed next to graves and associated with death and the ancestral world.

The culture known from Great Zimbabwe left more impressive buildings than sculpture, but the eight soapstone Zimbabwe Birds appear to have had a special significance and were mounted on monoliths. Modern Zimbabwean sculptors in soapstone have achieved considerable international success. Southern Africa's oldest known clay figures date from 400 to 600 AD and have cylindrical heads with a mixture of human and animal features.

== Gallery ==
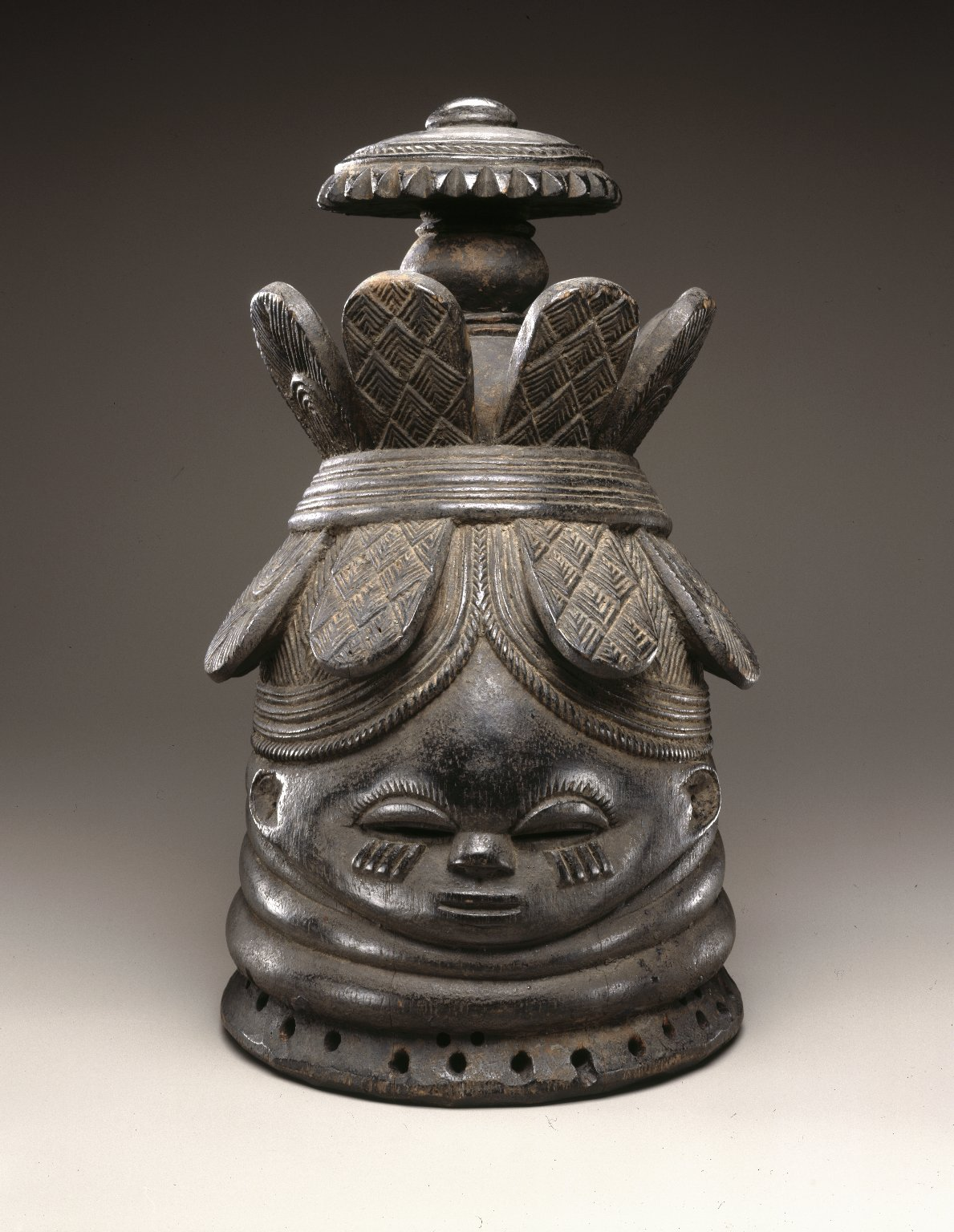
Helmet mask (ndoli jowei) for Sande society; late 19th-early 20th century; wood; 39.4 x 23.5 x 26 cm (15 1/2 x 9 1/4 x 10 1/4 in.); Brooklyn Museum (New York City). A vertical crack runs from base of mask to head band at back center and includes a triangular 1 3/4 hole below band

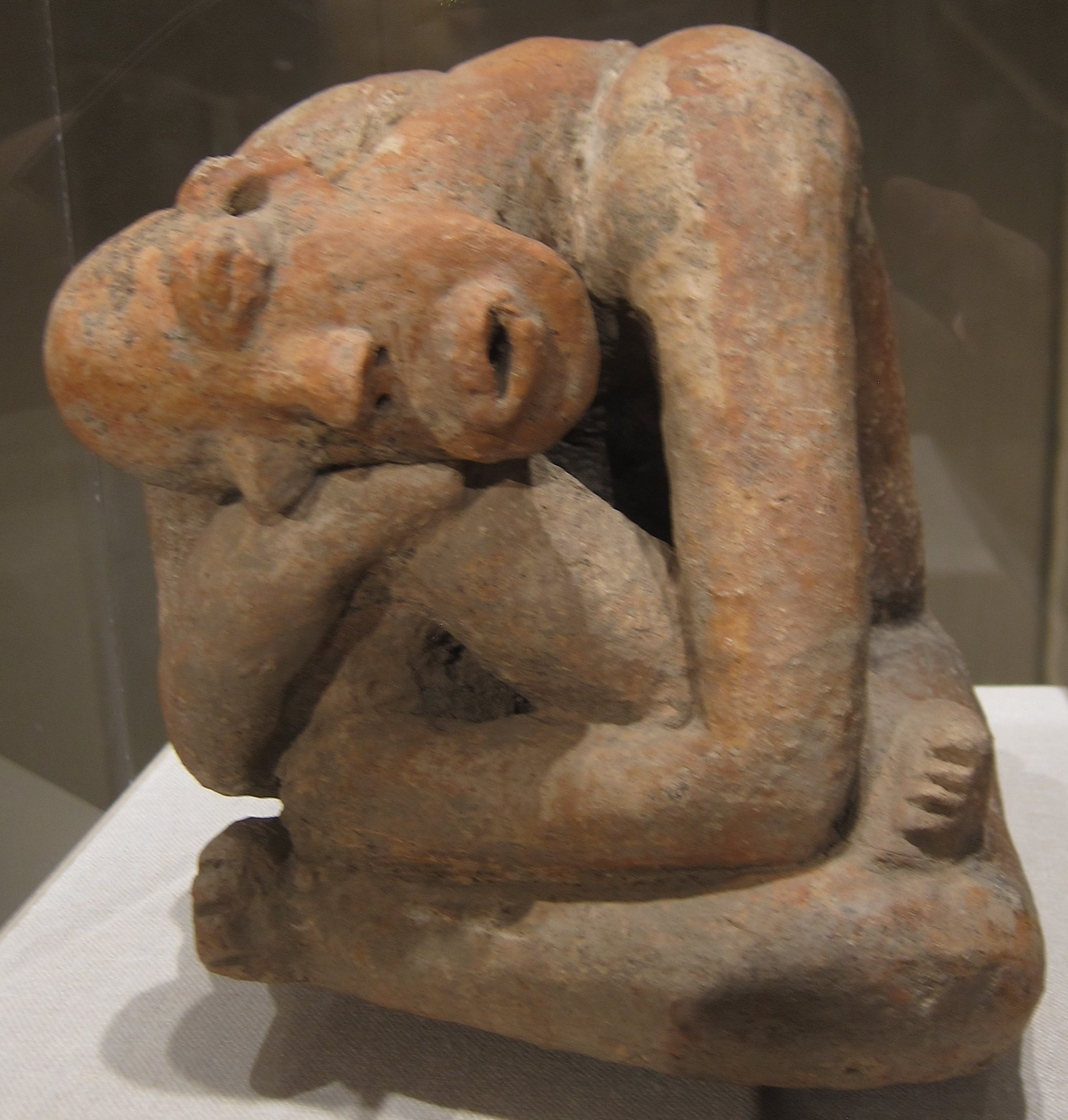
Terracotta seated figure from Mali; 13th century; earthenware; 29.9 cm (11 3/4 in) high; Metropolitan Museum of Art (New York City). The raised marks and indentations on the back of this hunched Djenné figure may represent disease or, more likely, sacrification patterns. The facial expression and pose could depict an individual in mouring or in pain

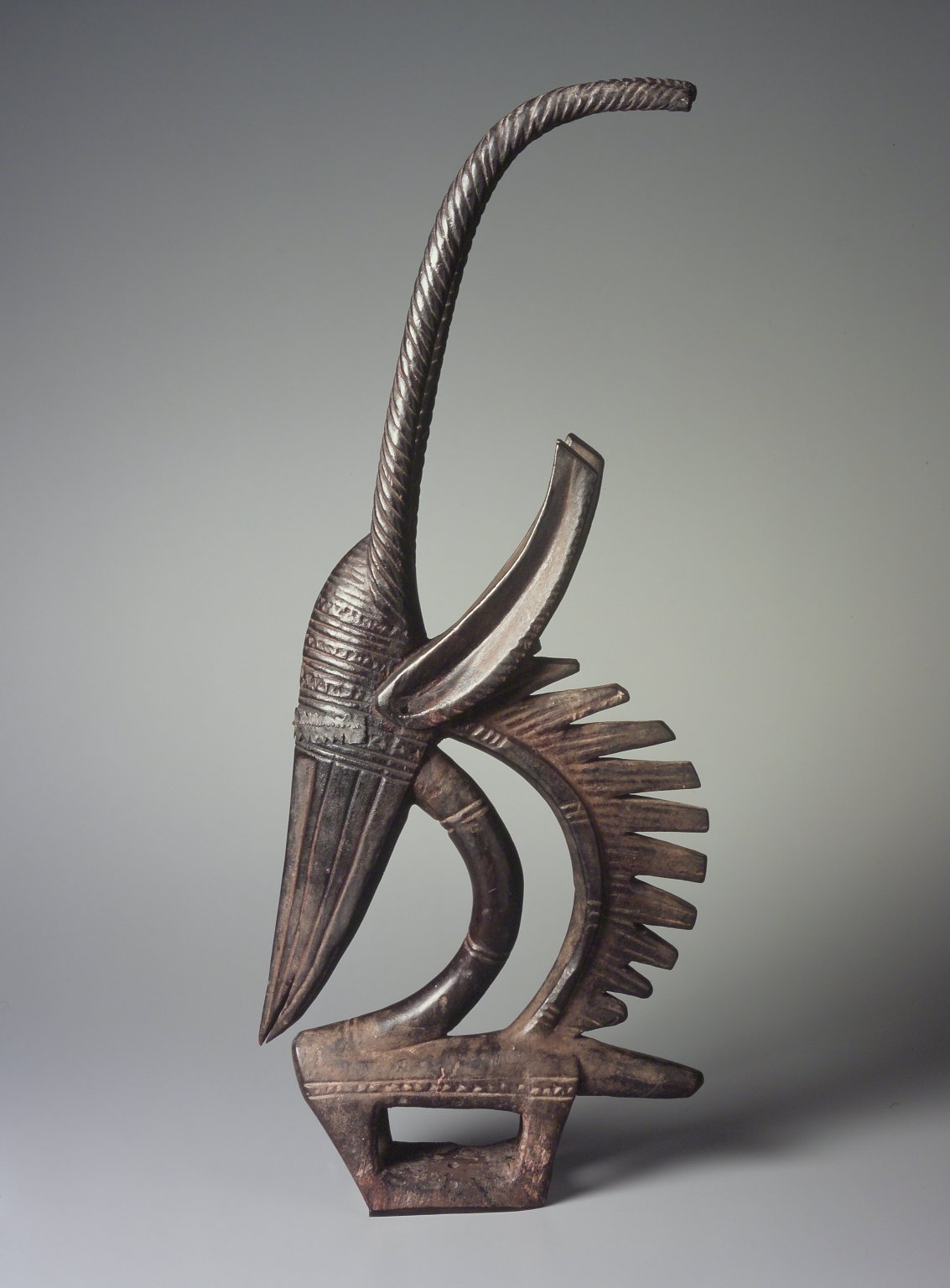
Chiwara headdress (male); late 19th-early 20th century; 72.4 x 30.5 x 7 cm (28 1/2 x 12 x 2 3/4 in.); by Bambara people; Brooklyn Museum. Chiwara masks are categorized in three ways: horizontal, vertical, or abstract. In addition, Chiwara can be either male or female

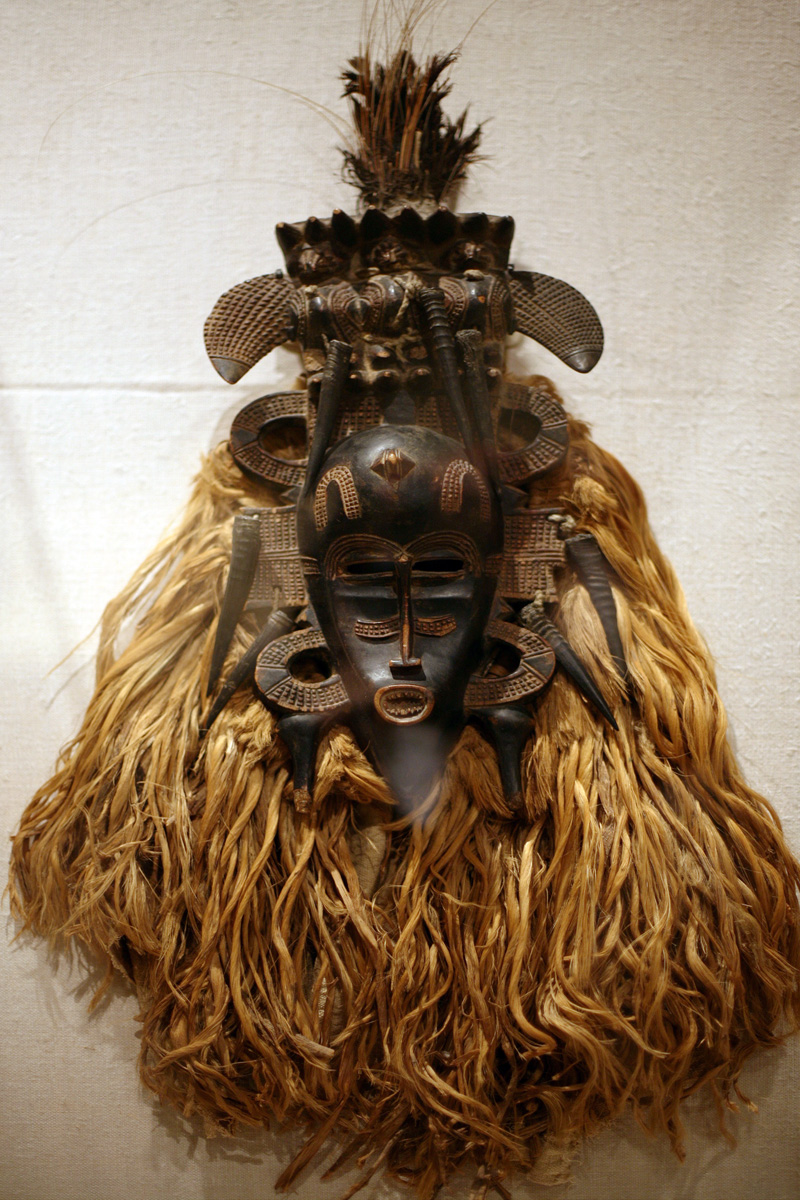
Poro mask; 19th-mid-20th century; wood, horns, raffia fiber, cotton cloth, feathers, metal; height: 30 1/4 in.; by Senufo people; Metropolitan Museum of Art. Designed to pay homage to female ancestors, this mask's serene dark oval face is offset by glinting brass, symmetrical extensions, and delicate patterns symbolizing wisdom and beauty

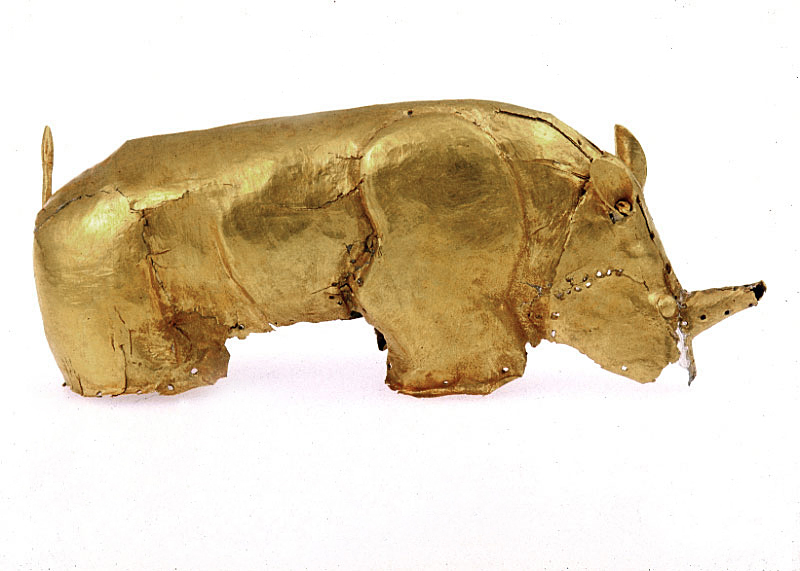
The Golden Rhinoceros of Mapungubwe; 1075–1220; discovered in 1932; Mapungubwe Collection (University of Pretoria Museums). This artifact is described as being "small enough to stand in the palm of your hand."

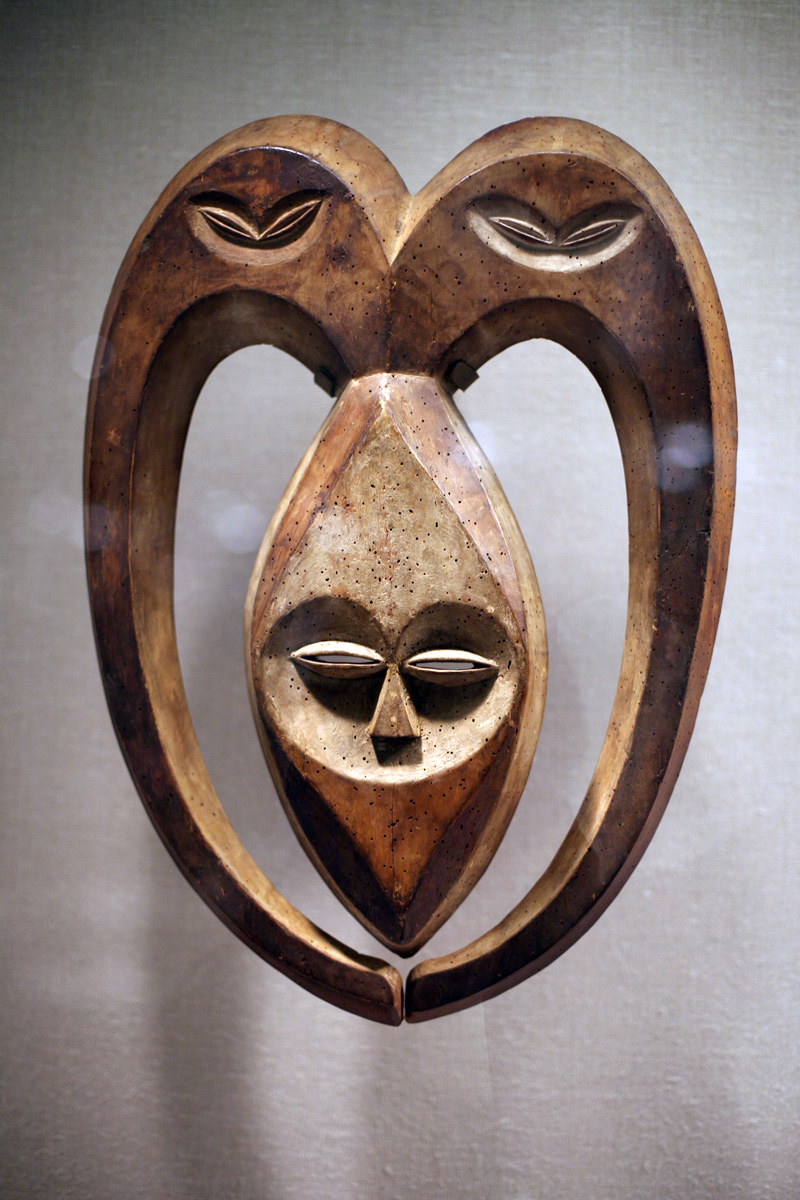
Kwele mask; 19th–20th century; wood coloured with kaolin; from Gabon or Democratic Republic of Congo; height: 52.7 cm (20 3/4 in.), width: 38.1 cm (15 in.); depth: 10.2 cm (4 in.); Metropolitan Museum of Art. This mask was used in the rituals of witchcraft protection

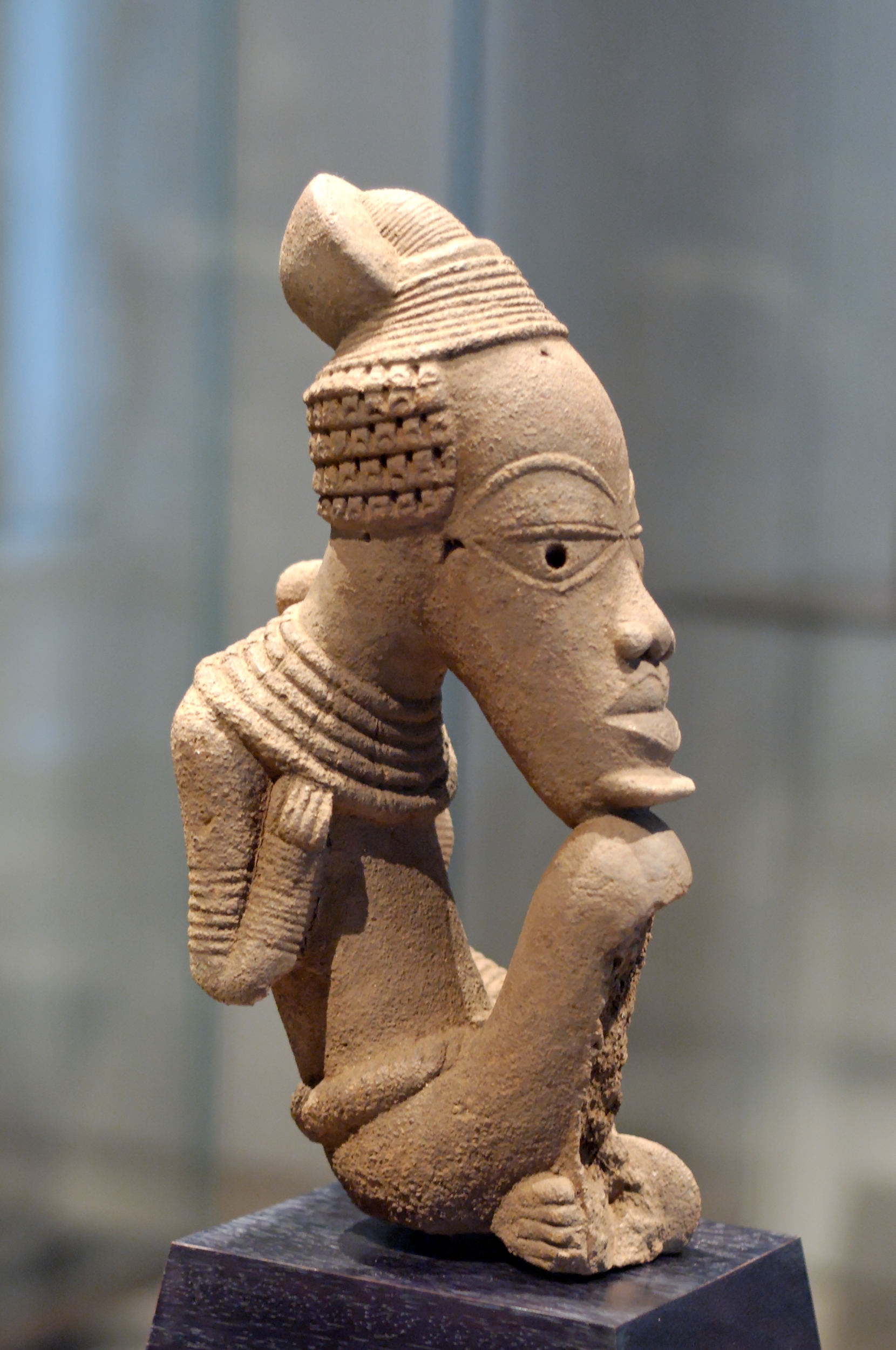
Nok seated figure; 5th century BC – 5th century AD; terracotta; 38 cm (1 ft 3 in); Musée du quai Branly (Paris). In this Nok work, the head is dramatically larger than the body supporting it, yet the figure possesses elegant details and a powerful focus. The neat protrusion from the chin represents a beard. Necklaces from a cone around the neck and keep the focus on the face

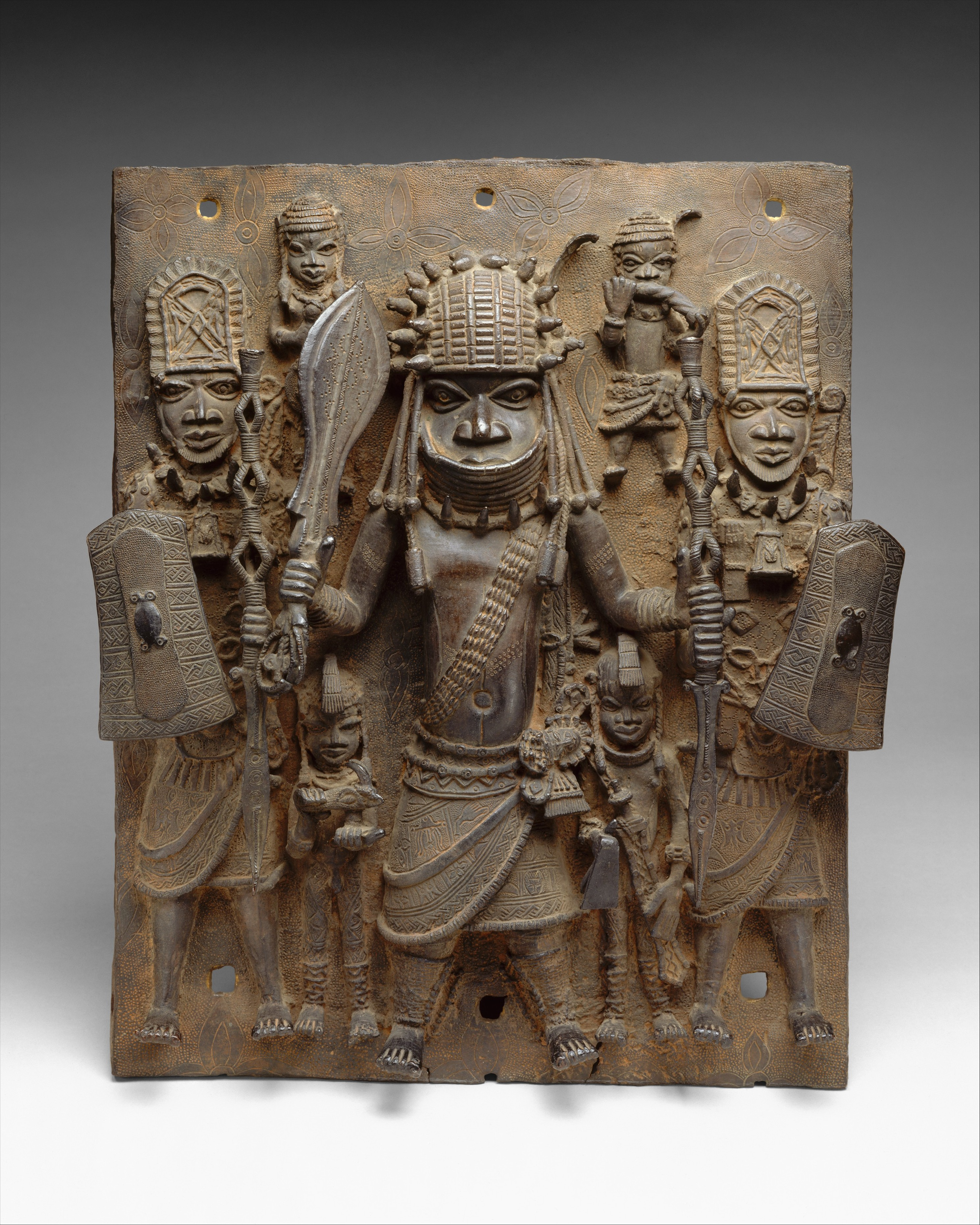
Benin plaque with warriors and attendants; 16th–17th century; brass; 47.6 cm (18 3/4 in.) height; Metropolitan Museum of Art. The Benin Bronzes led to a greater appreciation in Europe of African culture and art. Initially, it appeared incredible to the discoverers that people "supposedly so primitive and savage" were responsible for such highly developed objects

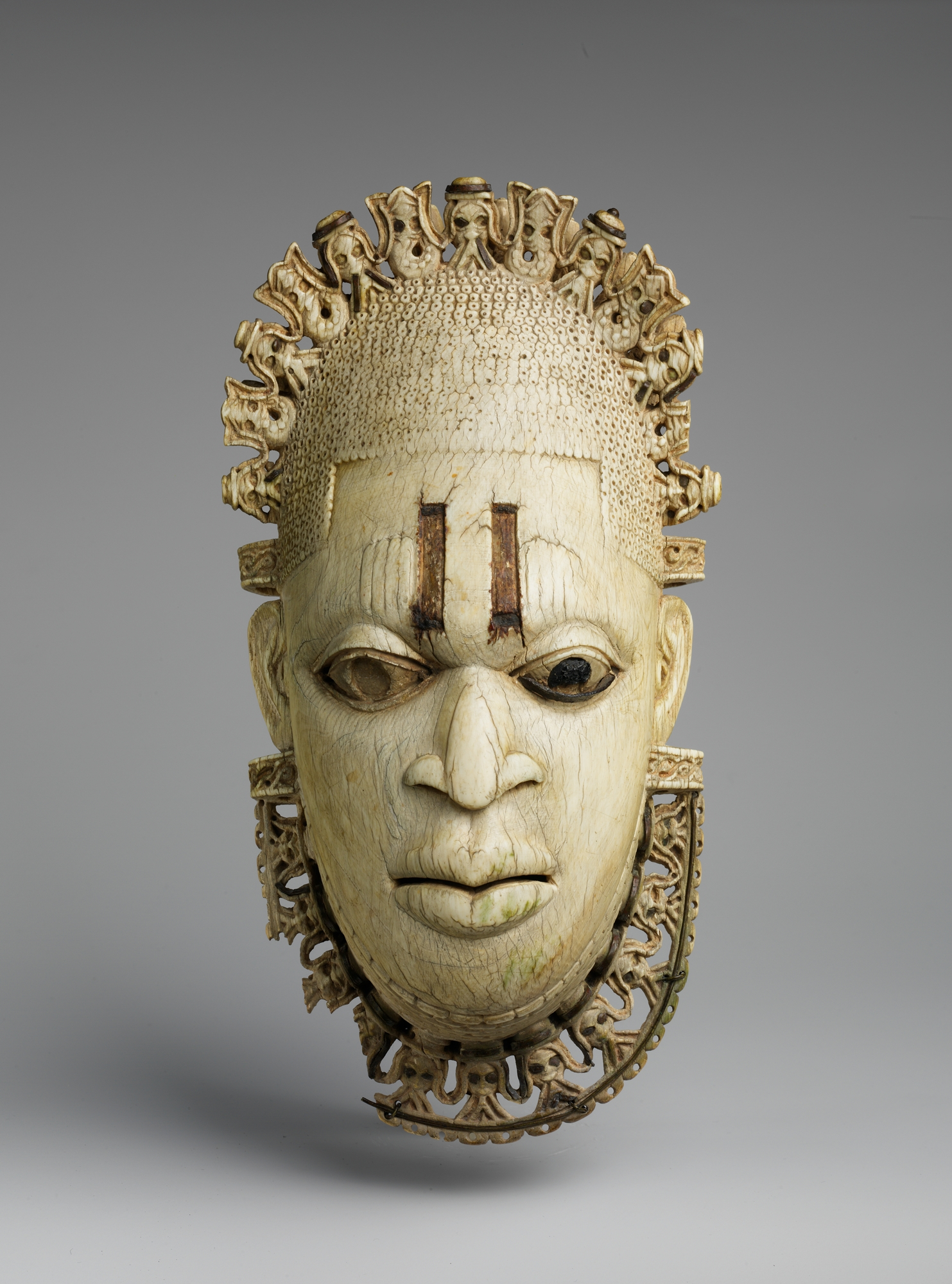
Benin ivory mask of the queen mother Idia; 16th century; ivory, iron & copper; Metropolitan Museum of Art. One of four related ivory pendant masks among the prized regalia of the Oba of Benin taken by the British during the Benin Expedition of 1897

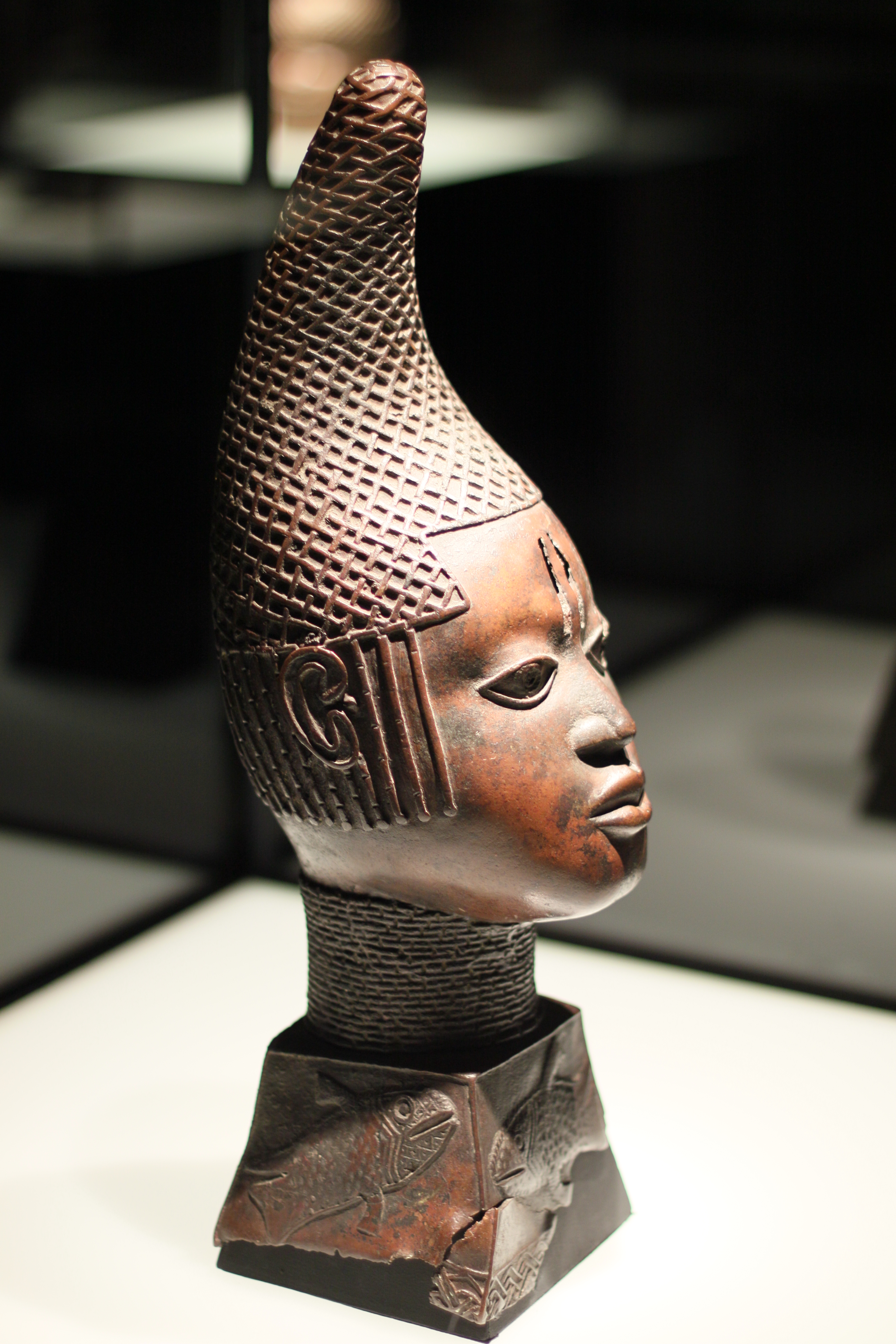
Head of Queen Idia; early 16th century; bronzs; from Kingdom of Benin; Ethnological Museum of Berlin (Germany). Queen Idia was a powerful monarch during the early sixteenth century at the Benin court. Four cast bronze heads of the queen are known and are currently in the collections of the British Museum, the World Museum in Liverpool, the Nigerian National Museum in Lagos and the Ethnological Museum of Berlin

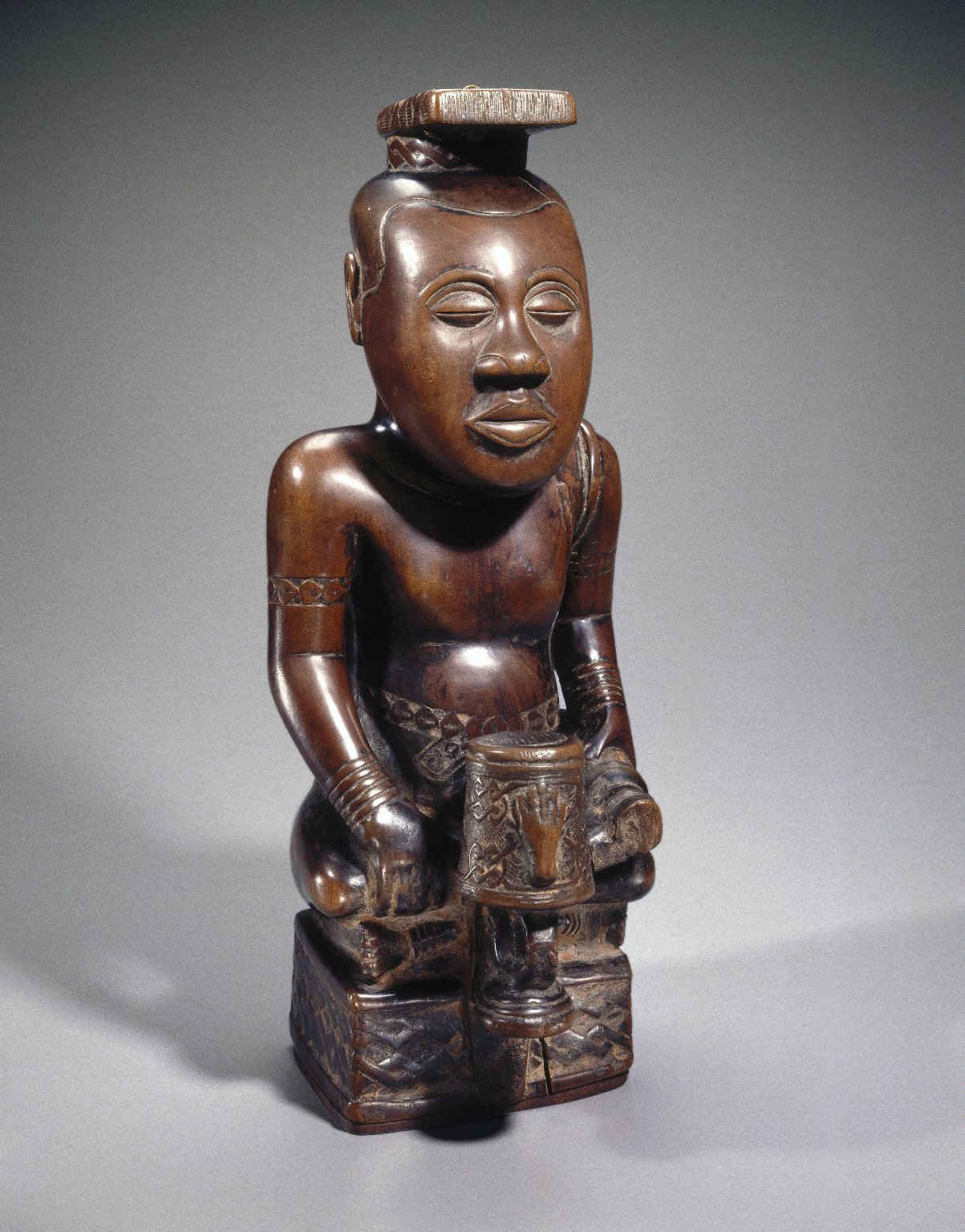
Ndop of king Mishe miShyaang maMbul; 1760–1780; wood; 49.5 x 19.4 x 21.9 cm (19 1/2 x 7 5/8 x 8 5/8 in.); Brooklyn Museum. Ndops are royal memorial portraits caverd by the Kuba people of Central Africa. They are not naturalistic portrayals but are intended as representations of the king's spirit and as an encapsulation of the principal of kingship

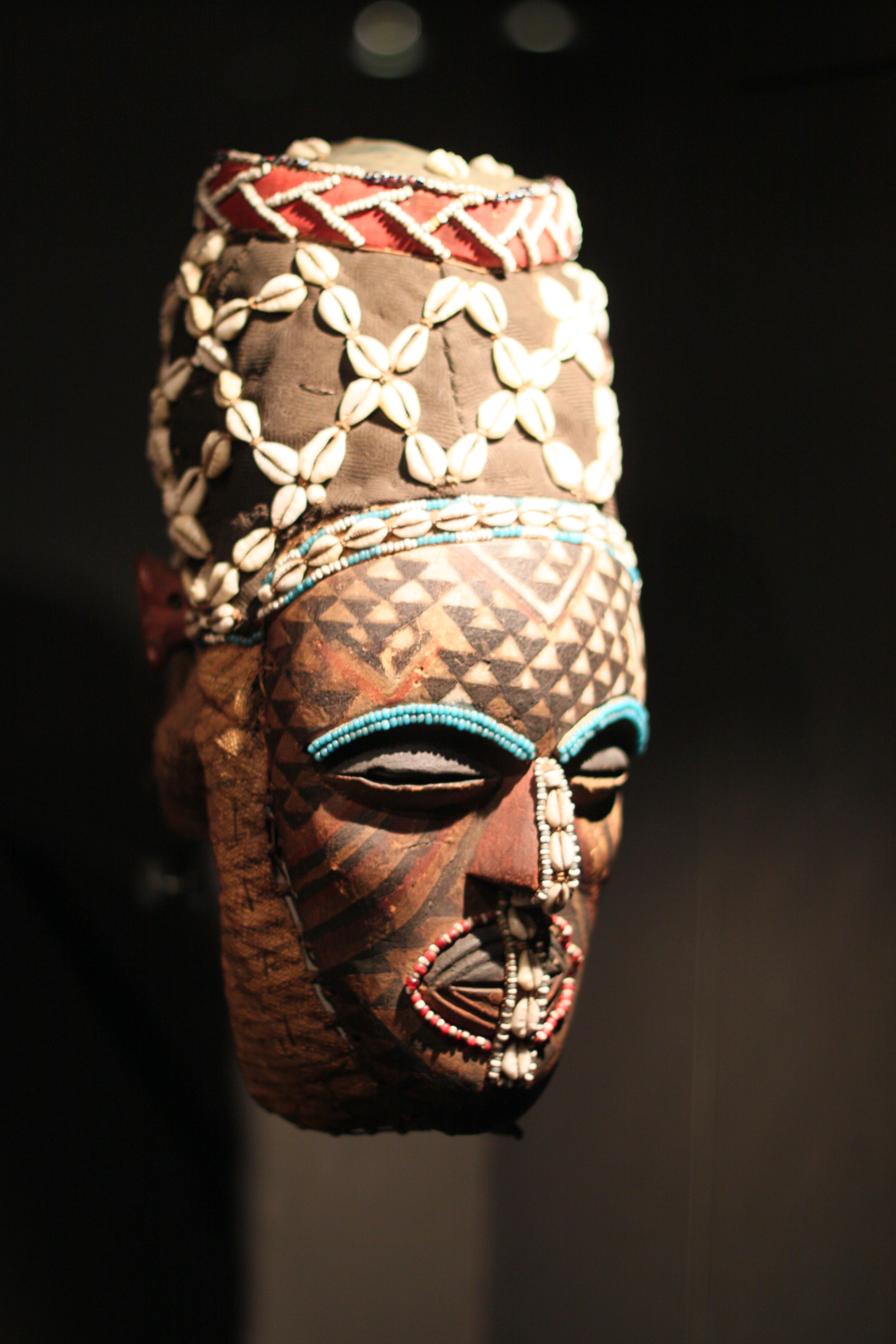
Ngady-Mwash mask; 19th century; from Kuba Kingdom; Ethnologic Museum of Berlin. A great deal of the art was created for the courts of chiefs and kings and was profusely decorated, incorporating cowrie shells and animal skins (especially leopard) as symbols of wealth, prestige and power

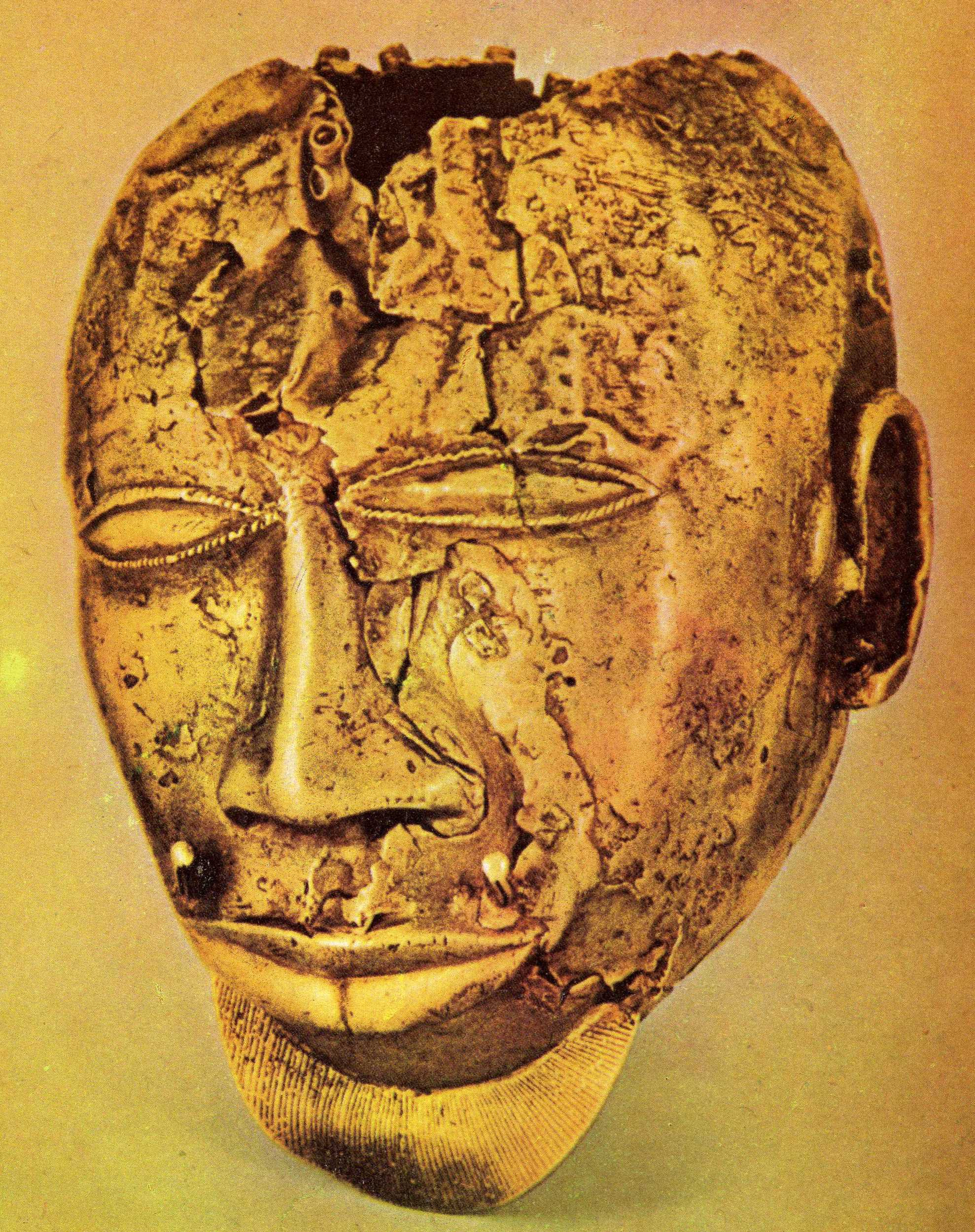
Ashanti trophy head; circa 1870; pure gold; Wallace Collection (London). This artwork represents an enemy chief killed in battle. Weighing 1.5 kg (3.3 lb), it was attached to the Asante king's state sword

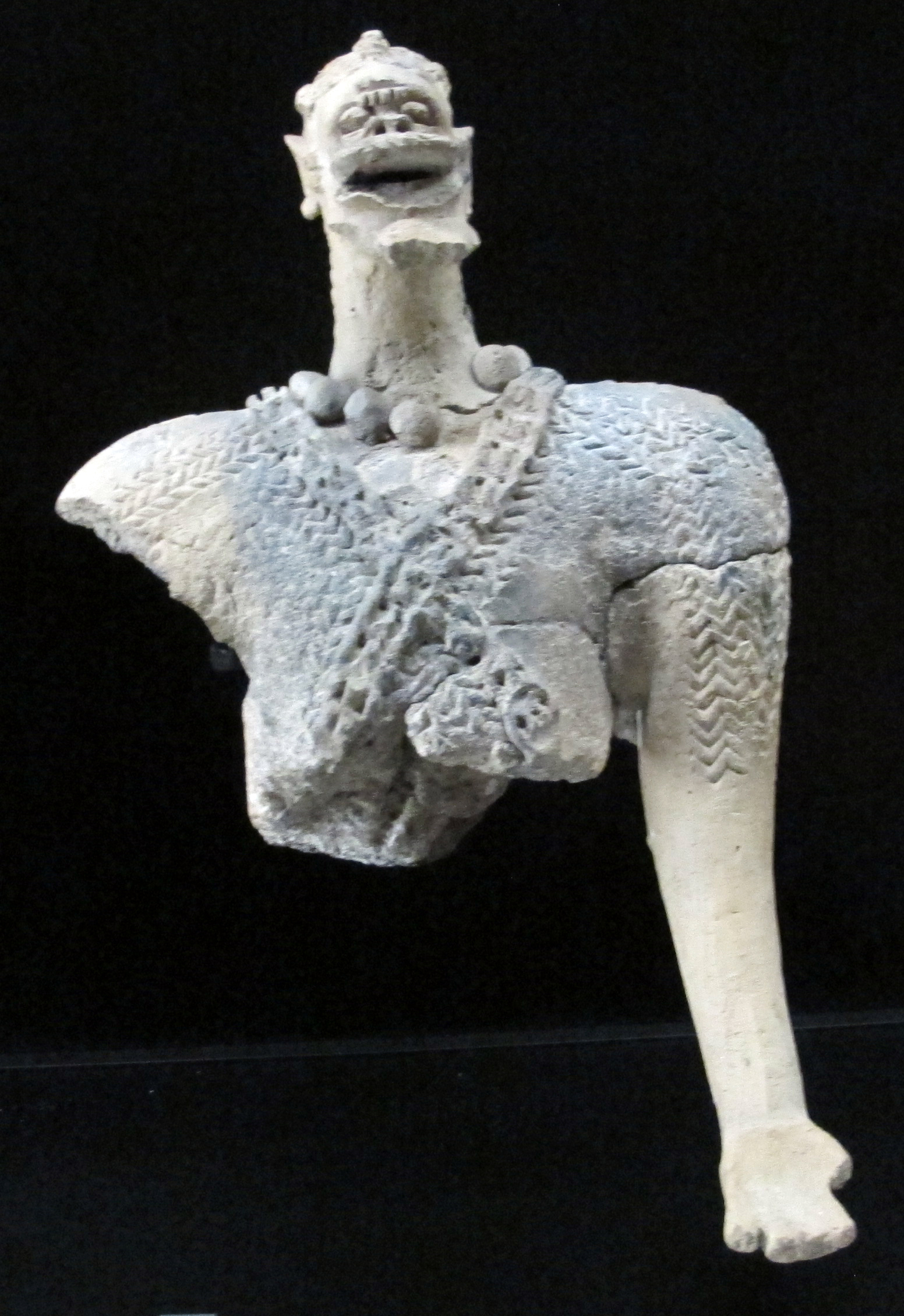
Sao anthropomorphic figure; 9th-16th century; from the N'djamena region; Musée du quai Branly

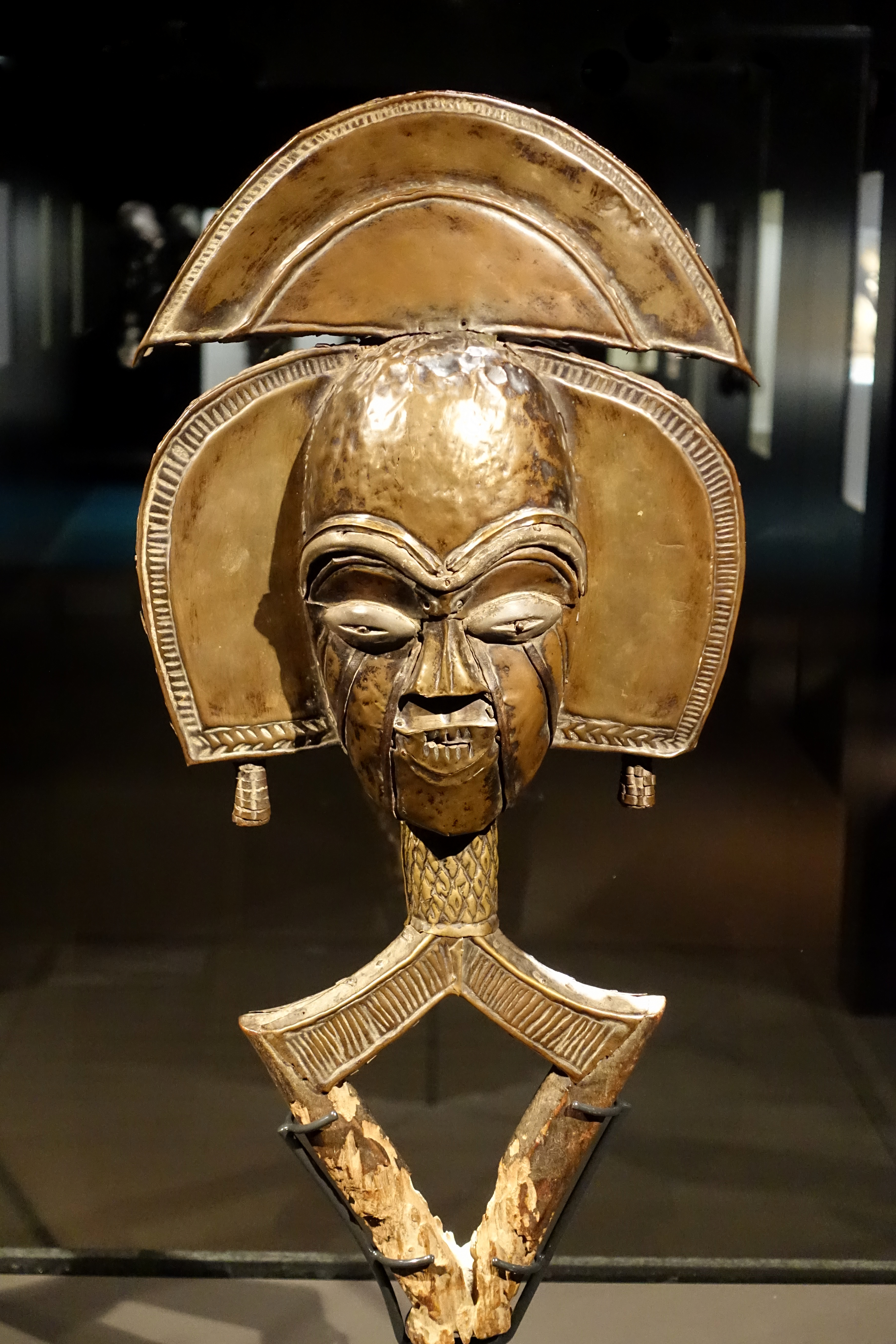
Mbulu viti reliquary figure; 19th-20th century; wood, brass, copper; by Kota people; Ethnographical Museum of Berlin. Finely carved and overlaid with contrasting cooper and brass, this sculpture combines shimmering surfaces, minimal depiction of physical features and body, and an imaginative elaboration of the head

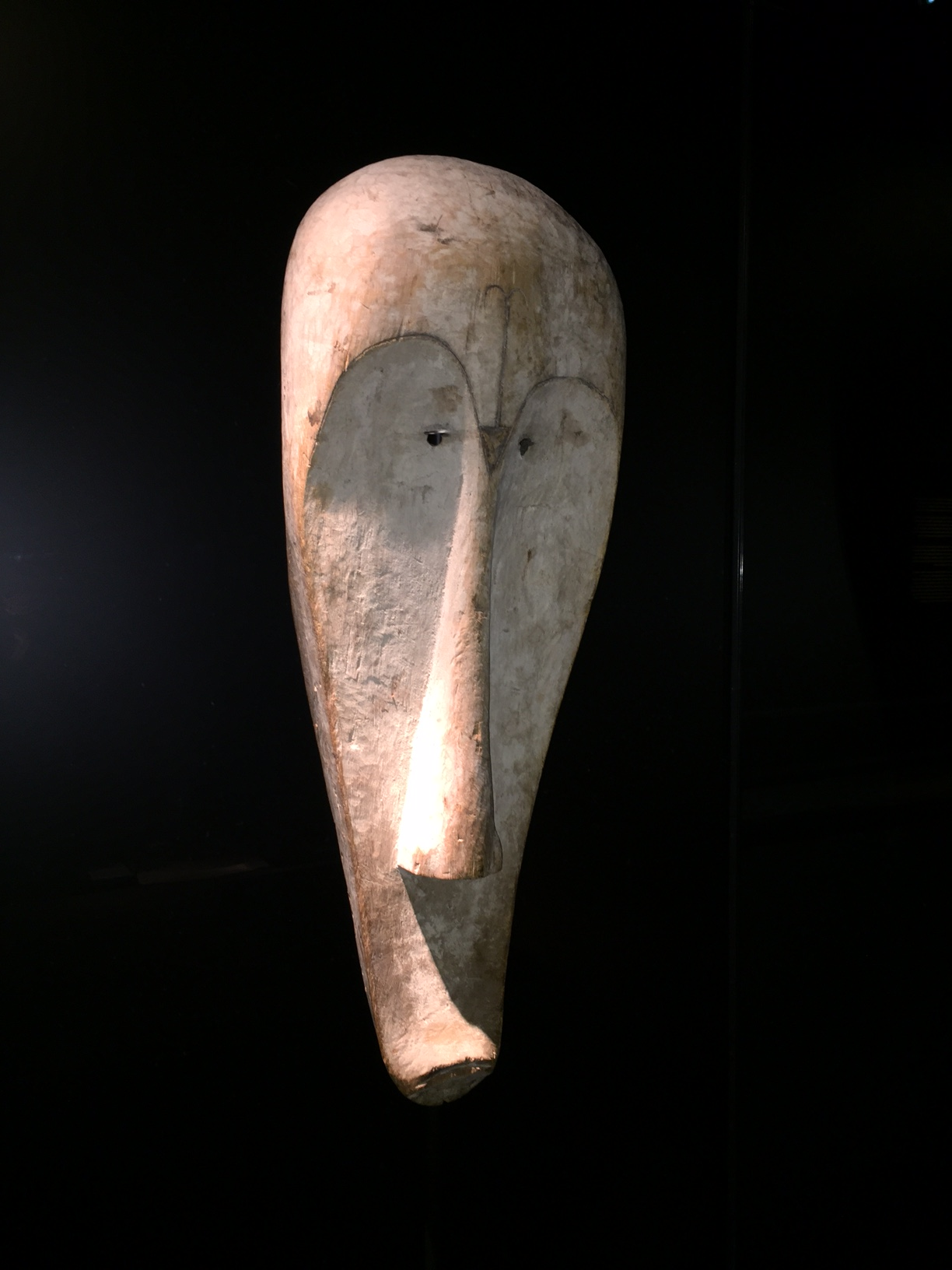
Ngil mask from Gabon or Cameroon; wood colored with kaolin (chiny clay); by Fang people; Ethnological Museum of Berlin. Worn with full costume in a night masquerade to settle disputes and quell misbehavior, this calm visage was terrifying to wrong-doers

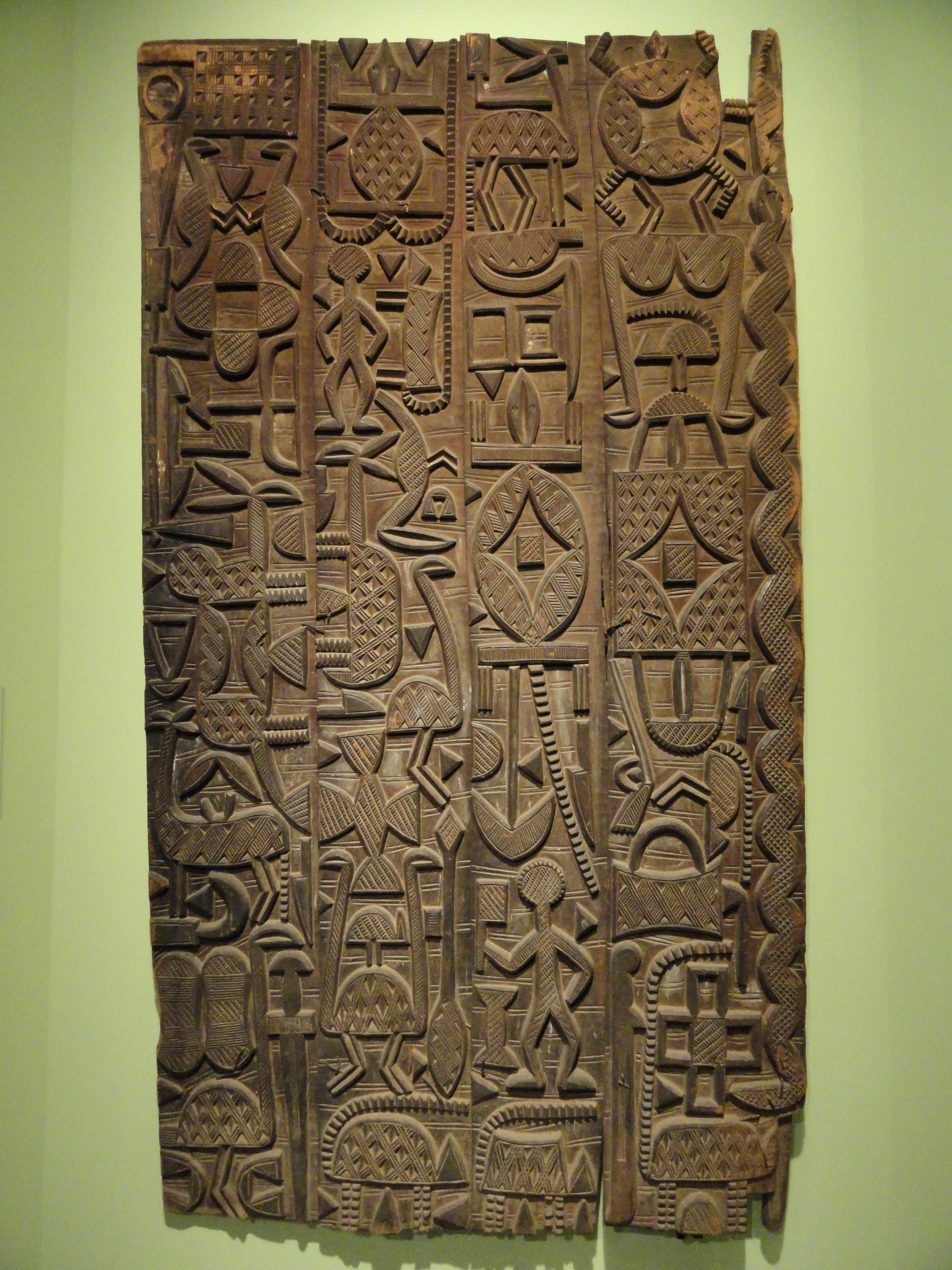
Carved door; circa 1920–1940; wood with iron staples; by Nupe people; Hood Museum of Art (Hanover, New Hampshire, USA). Nupe art is often abstract, being well known for their wooden stools with patterns carved onto the surface

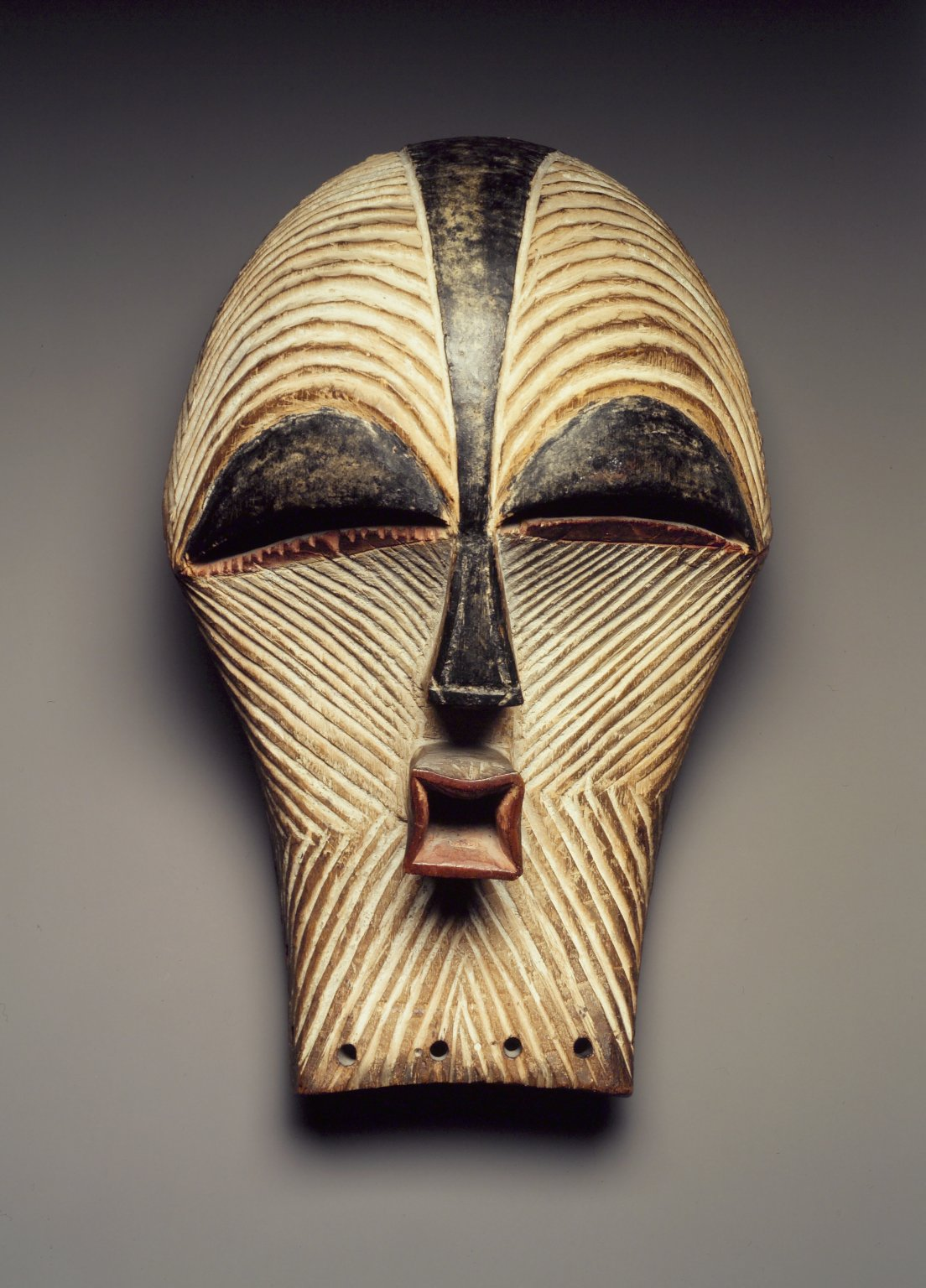
Female kifwebe mask; late 19th or early 20th century; 30.5 x 18.1 x 15.6 cm (12 x 7 1/8 x 6 1/8 in.); Brooklyn Museum. The kifwebe masquerade is a genre shared by the Luba and Songye, indicative of the interaction that has occurred between the two societies. Kifwebe masks represent either male or female beings

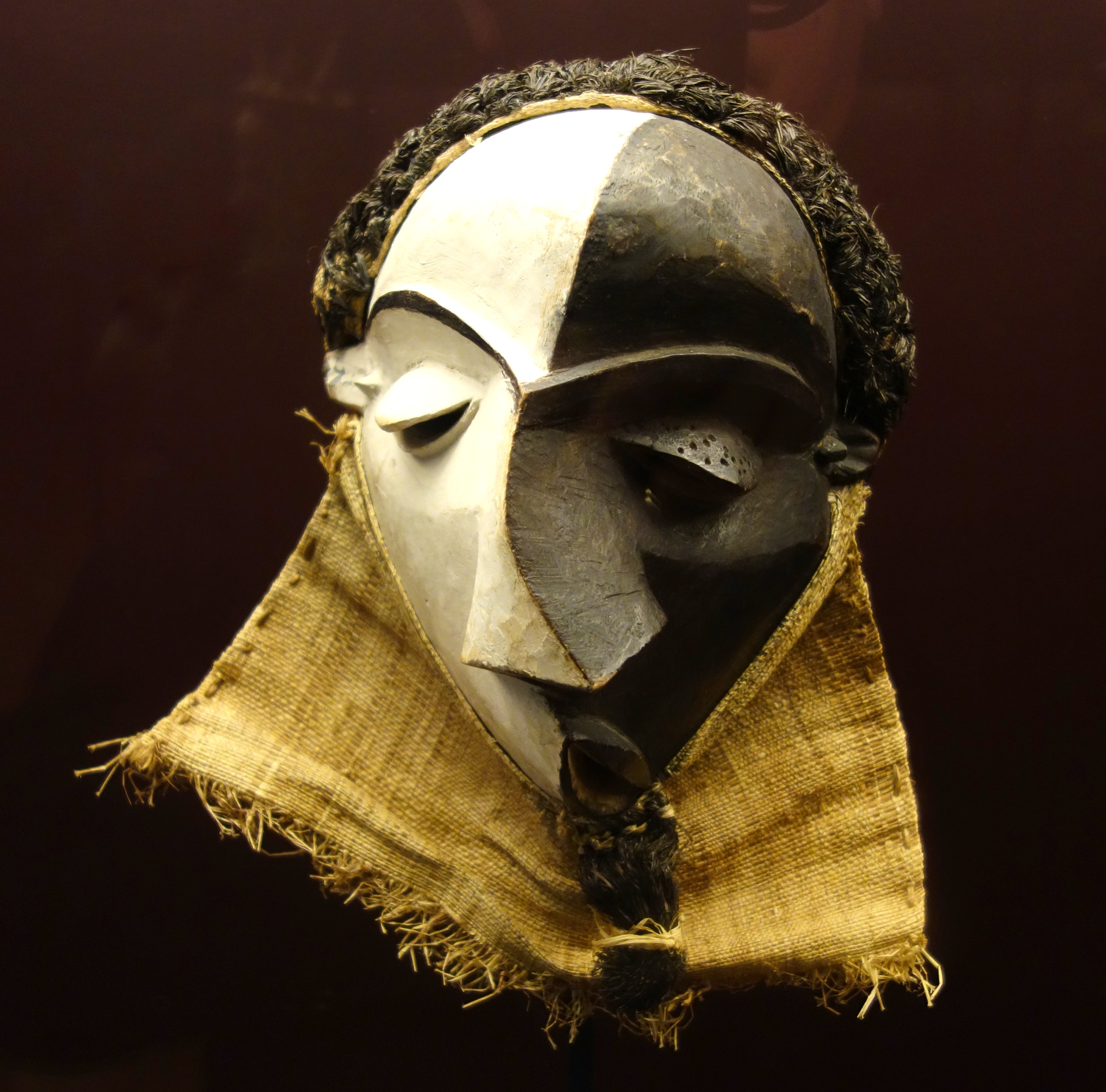
Mbangu mask; wood, pigment & fibres; height: 27 cm; by Pende people; Royal Museum for Central Africa (Tervuren, Belgium). Representing a disturbed man, the hooded v-looking eyes and the mask's artistic elements – facd surfaces, distored features, and divided colour – evoke the experience of personal inner conflict. Picasso copied a mirror image of this Pende mask in "Les Demoiselles d'Avignon"

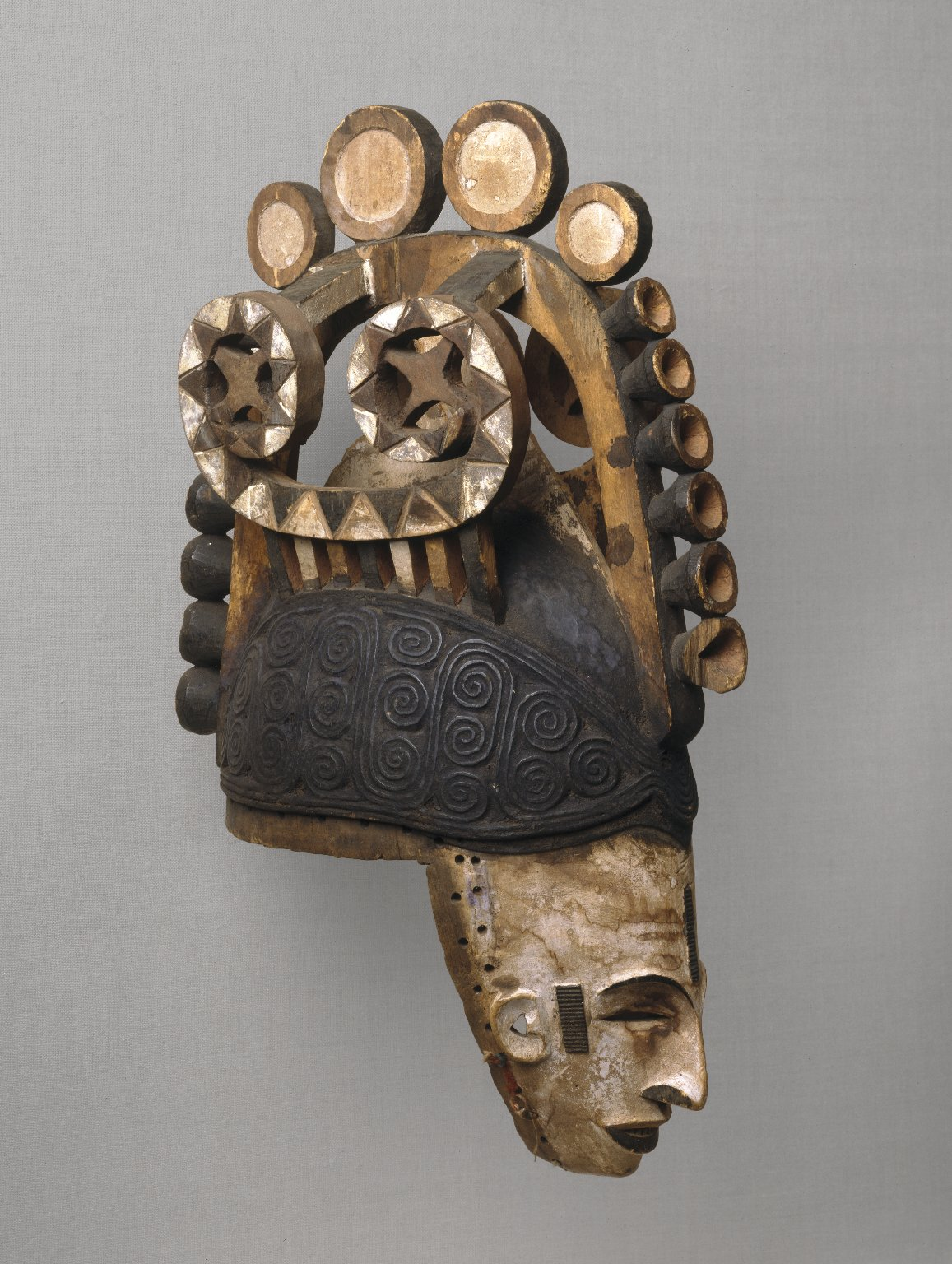
Igbo maiden spirit helmet mask (Agbogho Mmwo); early 20th century; 50.2 x 14.6 x 30.5 cm (19 3/4 x 5 3/4 x 12 in.); Brooklyn Museum. This helmet mask has long narrow face, painted white; narrow protruding sharp nose; slit eyes; open mouth showing teeth; small ears

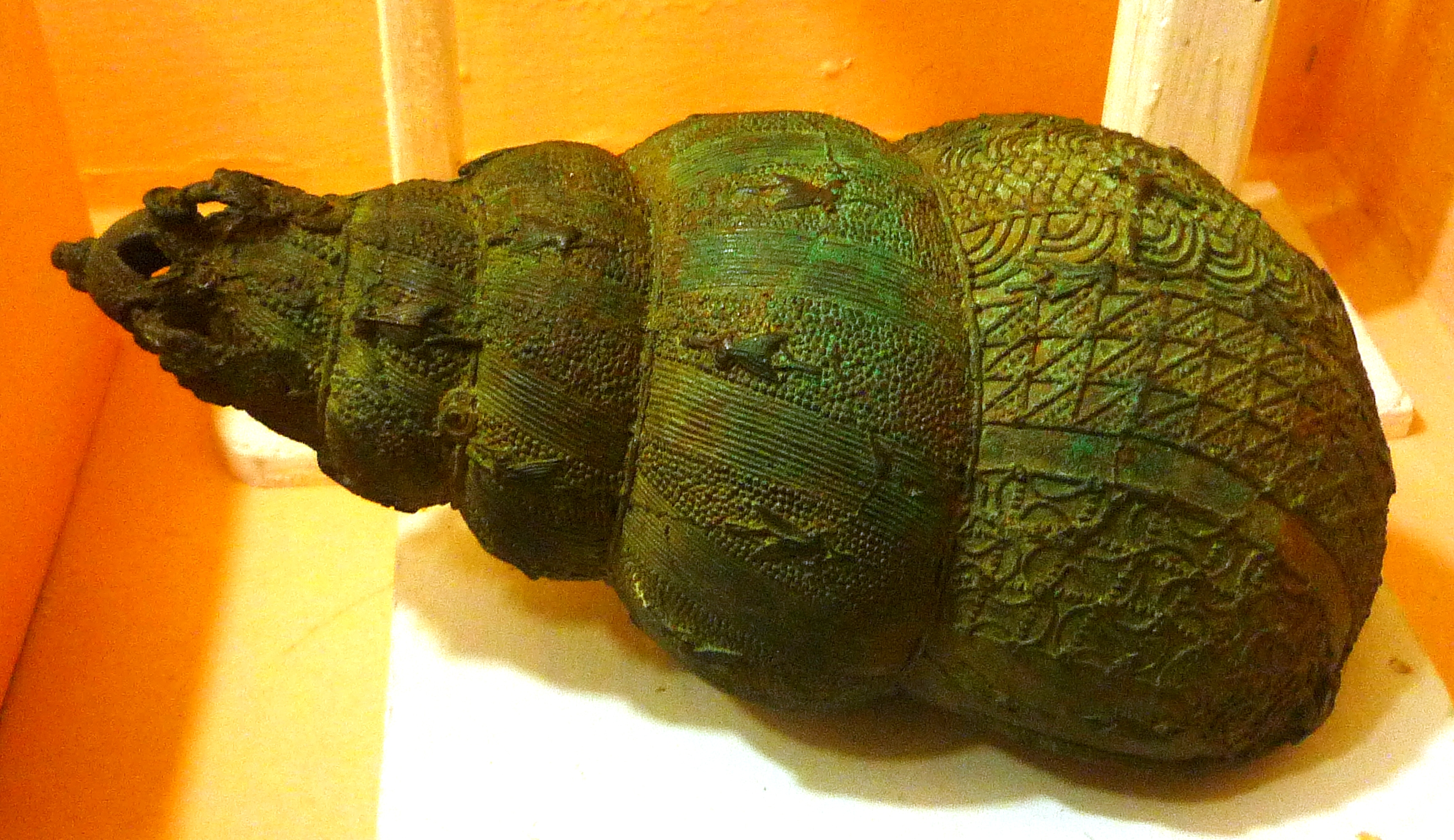
Bronze ornamental staff head; 9th century; from Igbo-Ukwu; Nigerian National Museum (Lagos, Nigeria)

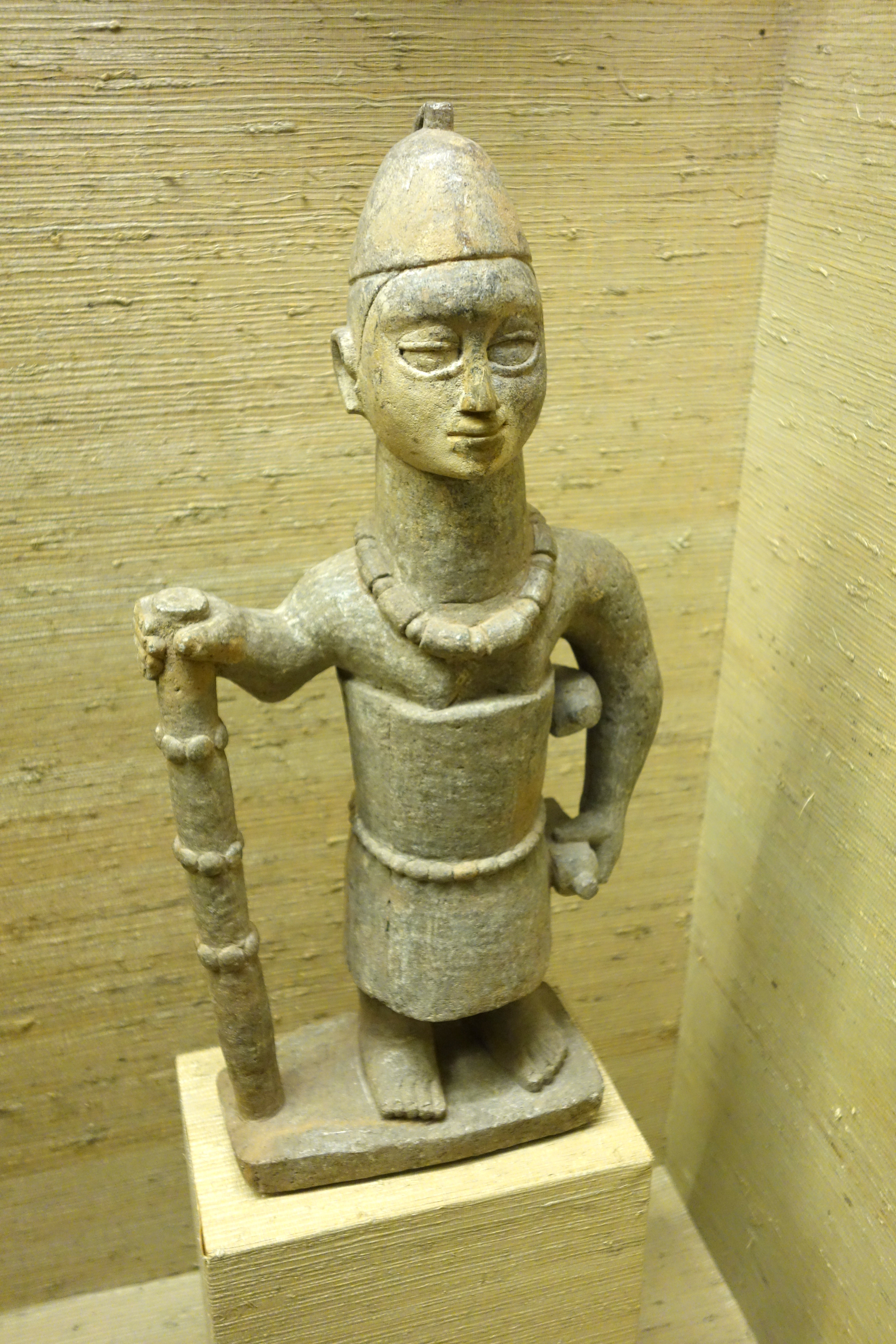
Tomb figure; soapstone; by Boma people, from Democratic Republic of Congo; Royal Museum for Central Africa. Stone sculptures are extremely rare in African art

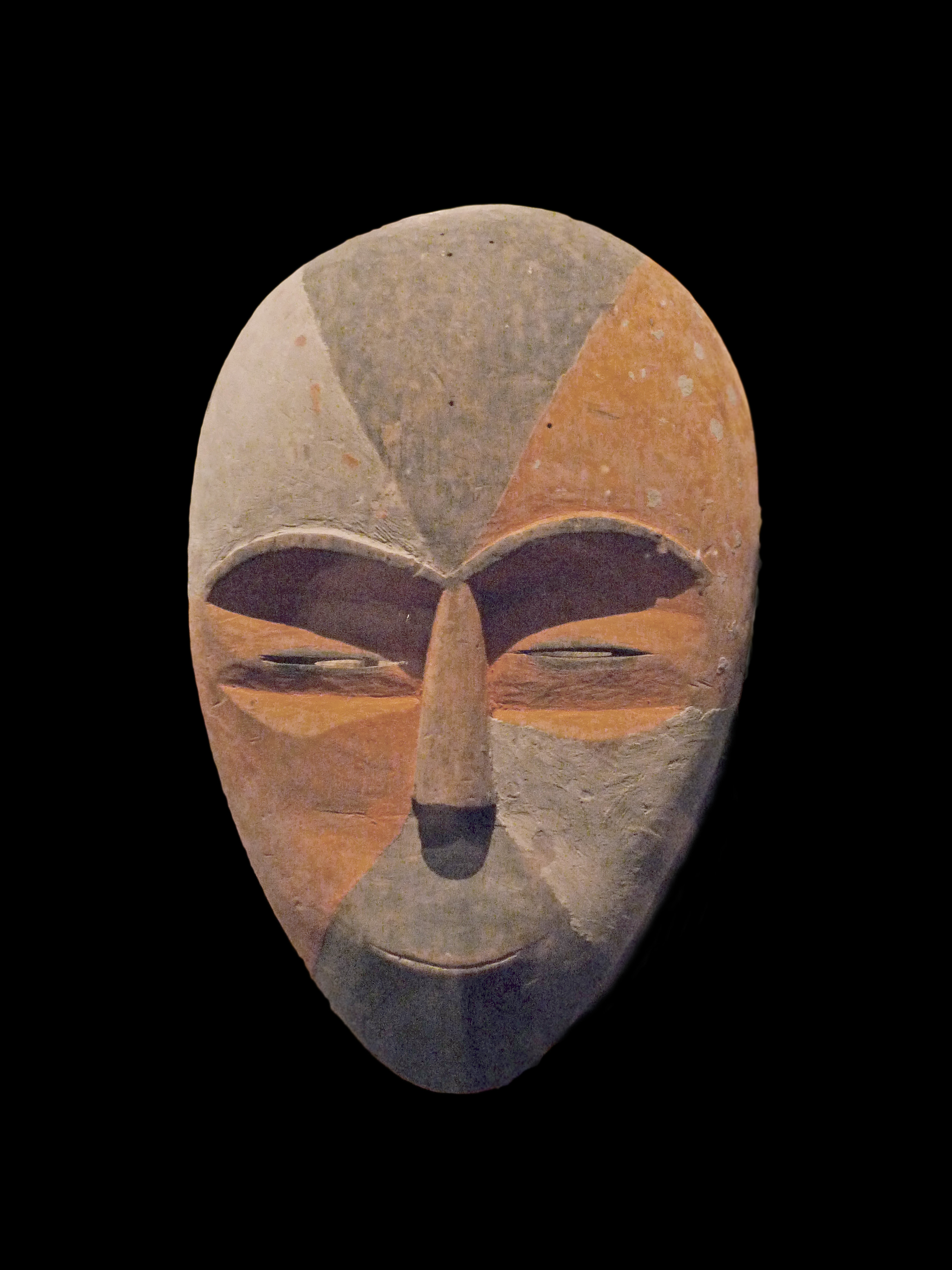
Anthropomorphic dance mask; early 19th century; by Adouma people; from Gabon; wood & pigments; Musée du quai Branly

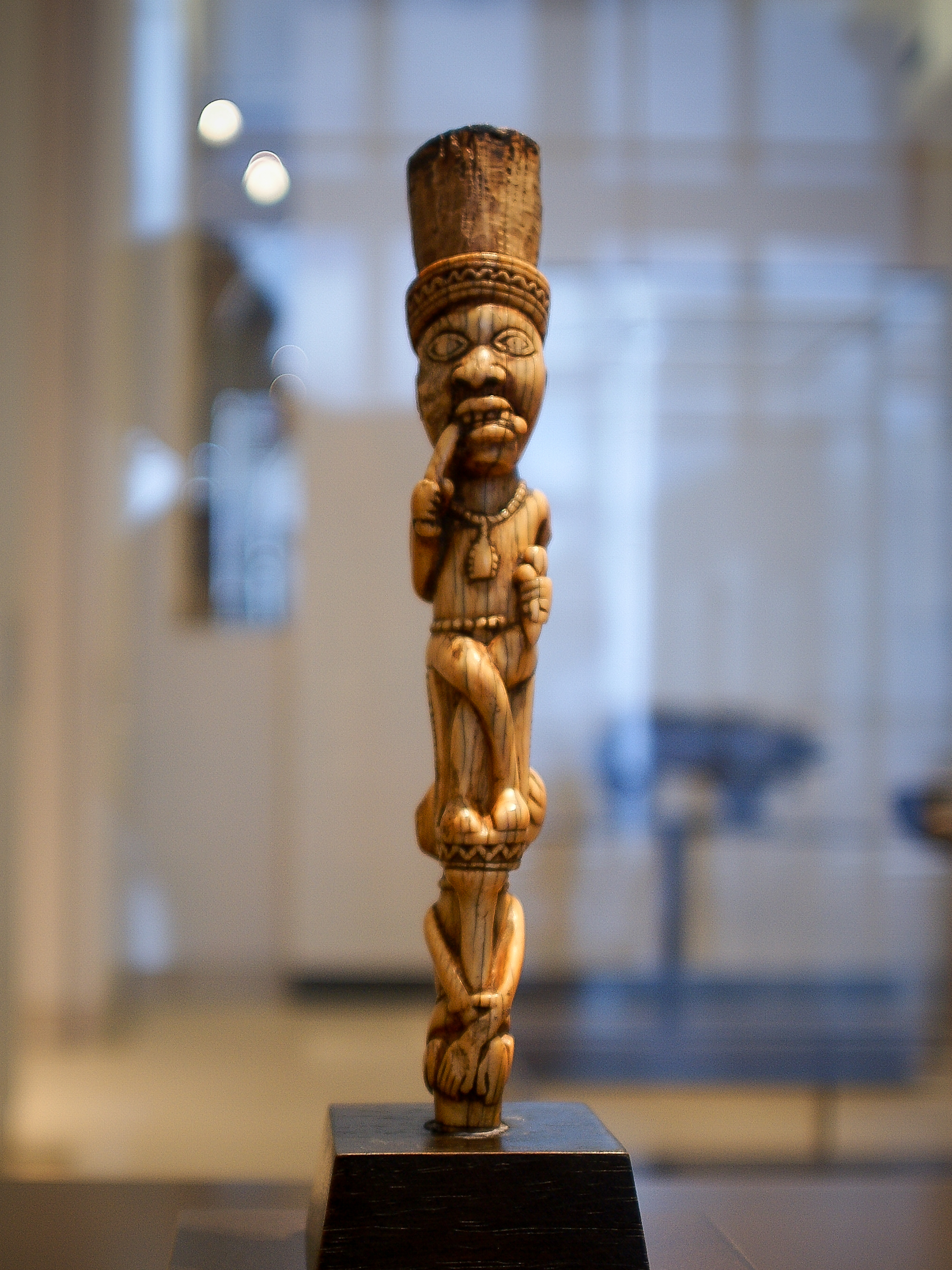
Head of a scepter; 19th century; by Yombe people

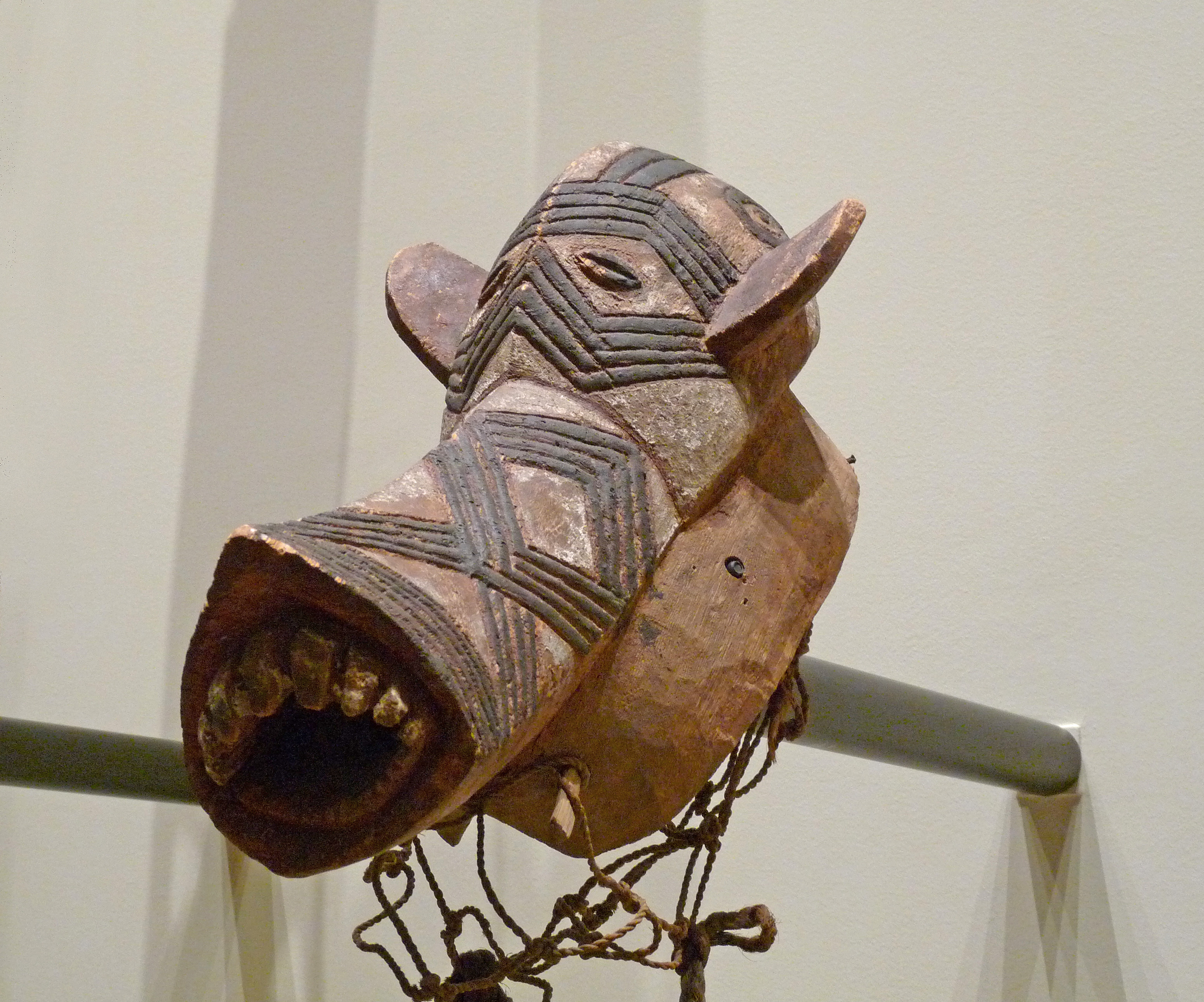
Mask from Burkina Faso, 19th century

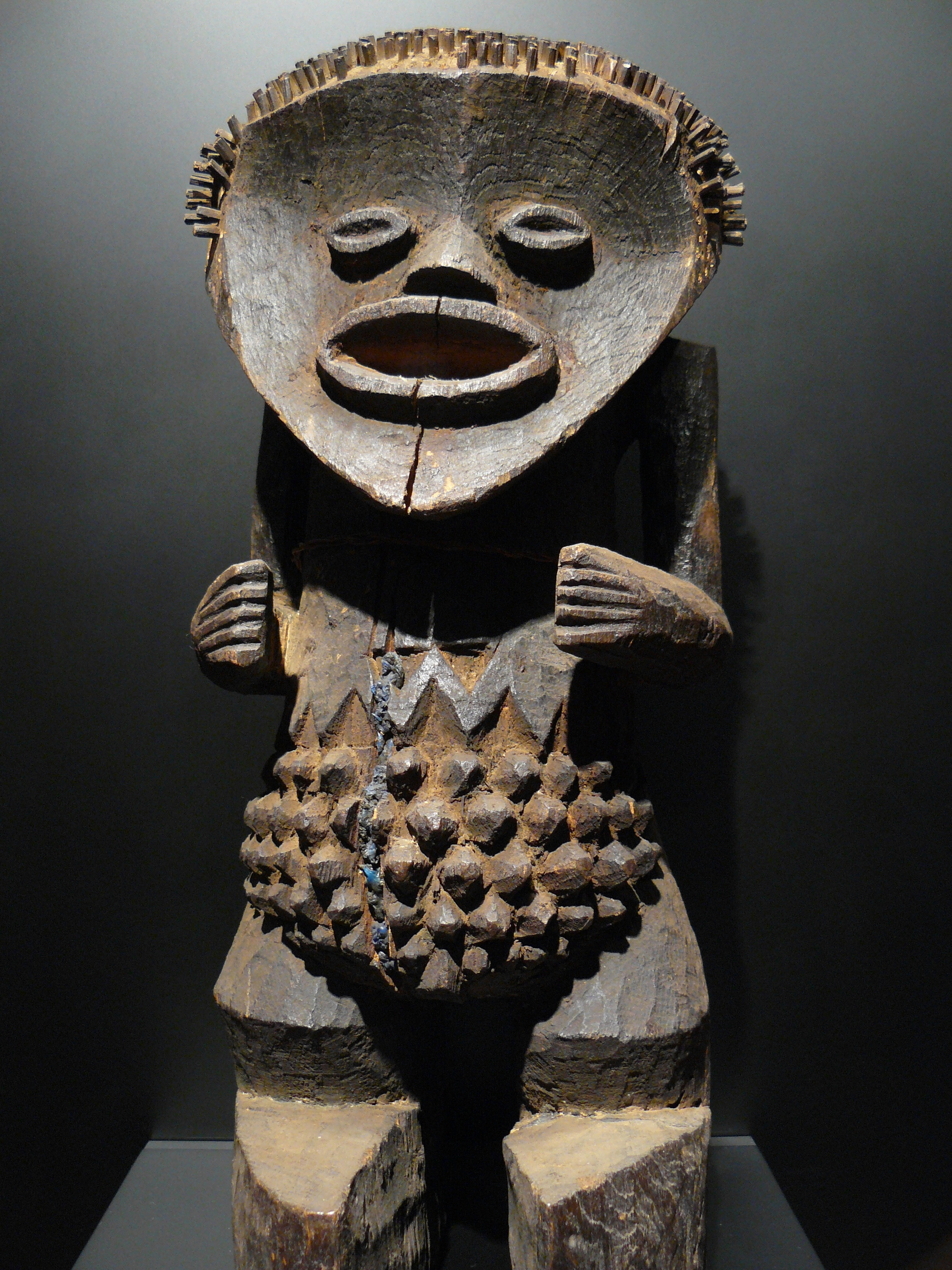
Mambila figure, Nigeria

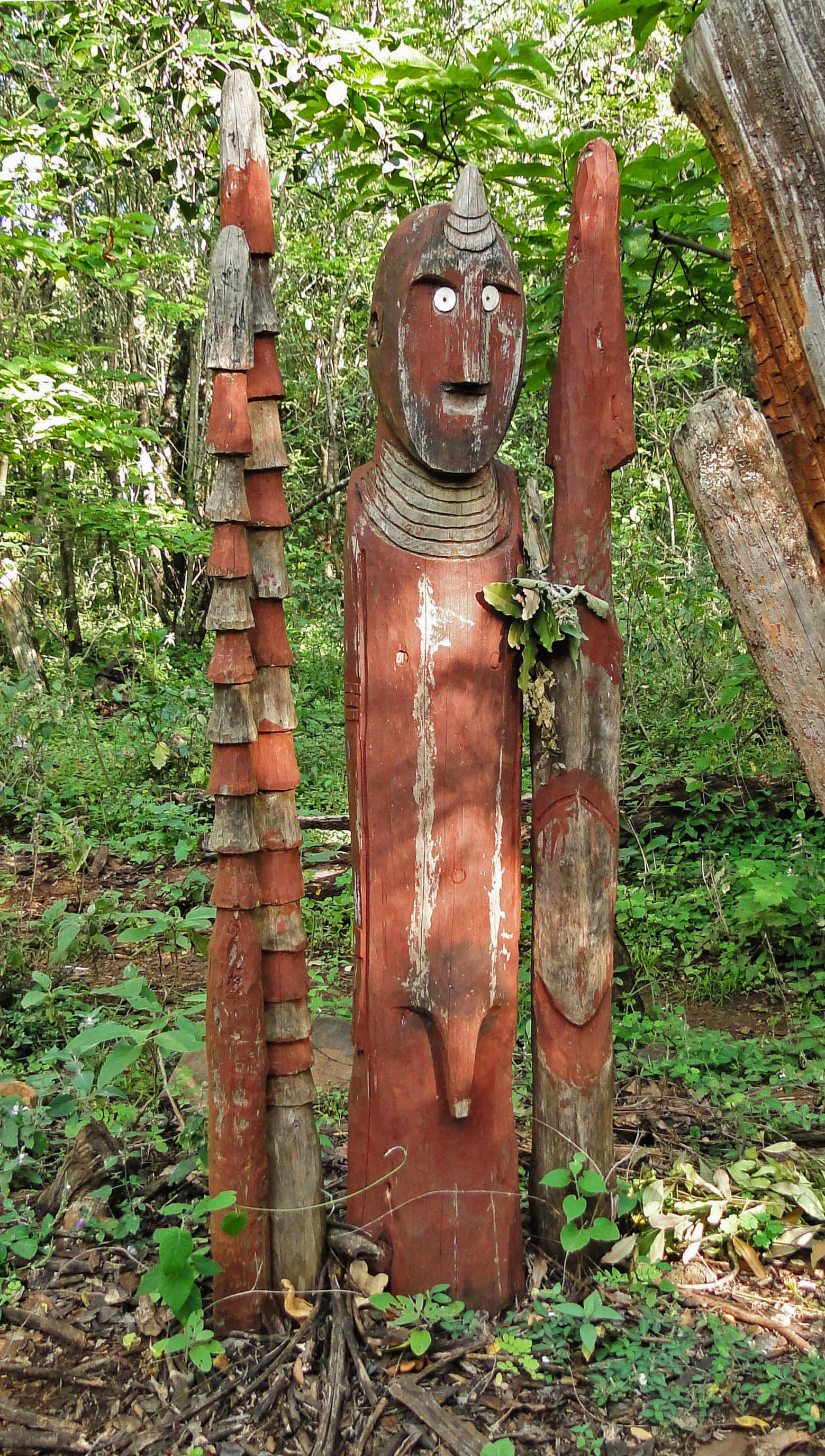
Waga sculptures from Ethiopia

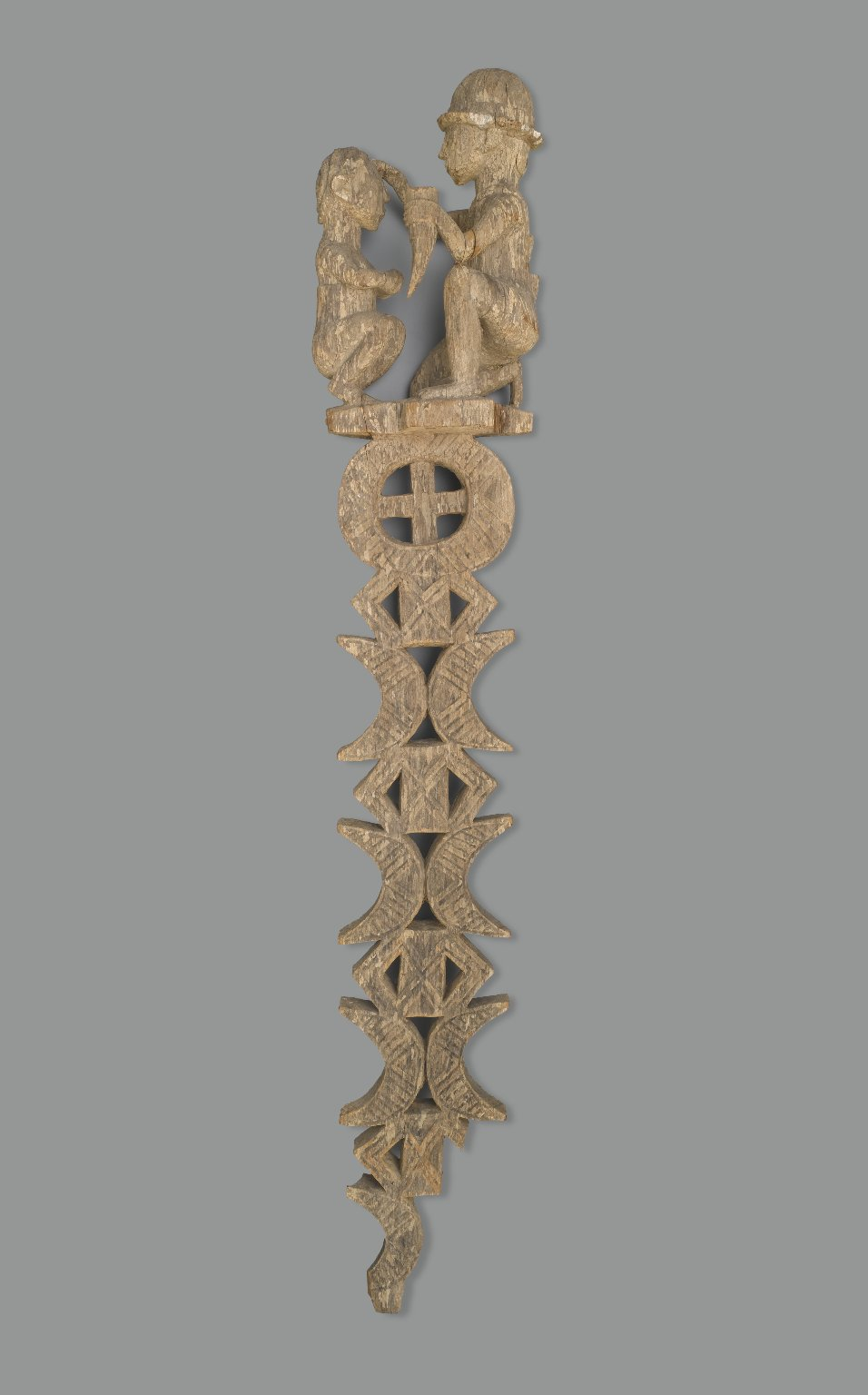
Mahafaly gravepost (Aloalo), Brooklyn Museum

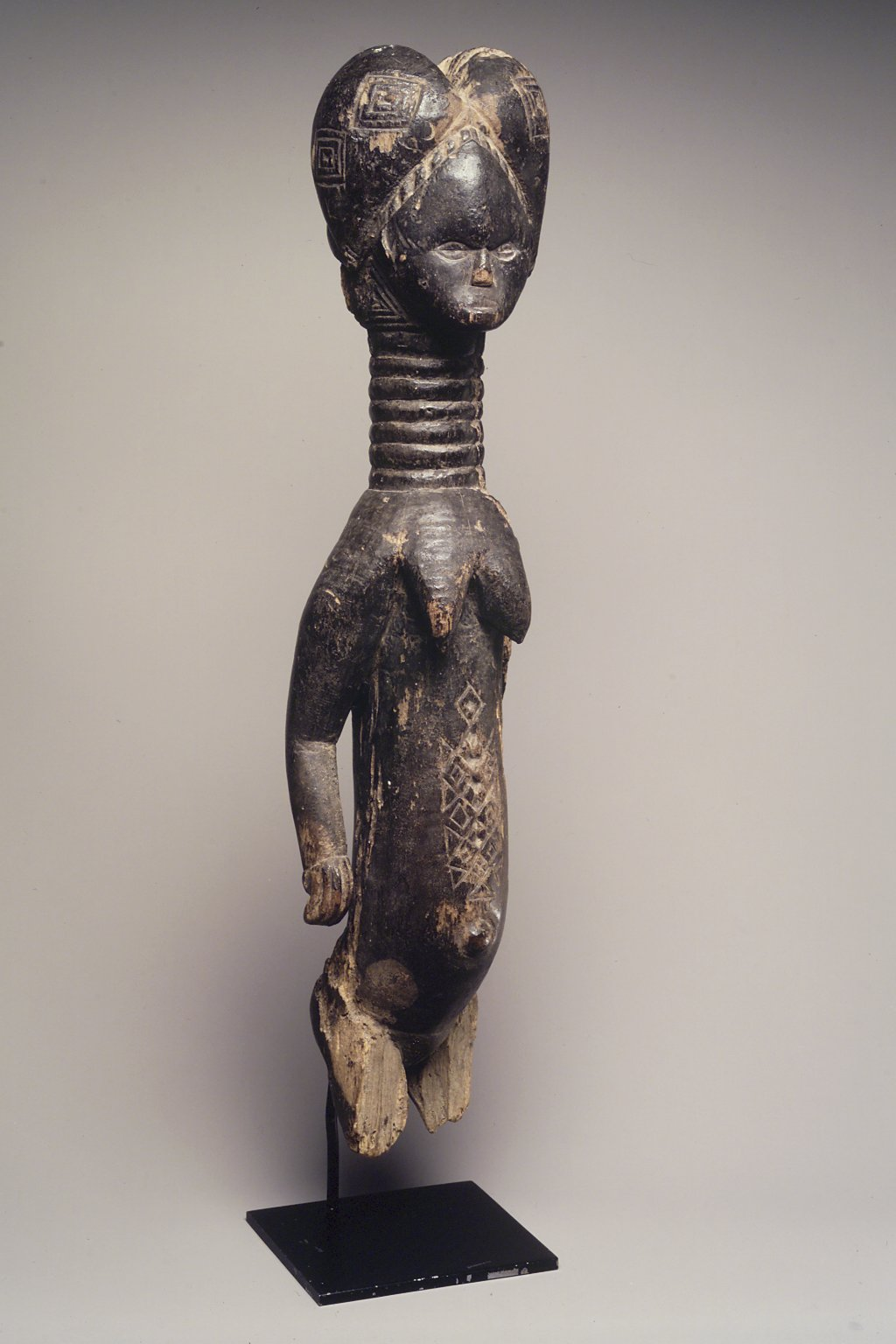
Mende, Fragment of a Female Figure, Brooklyn Museum

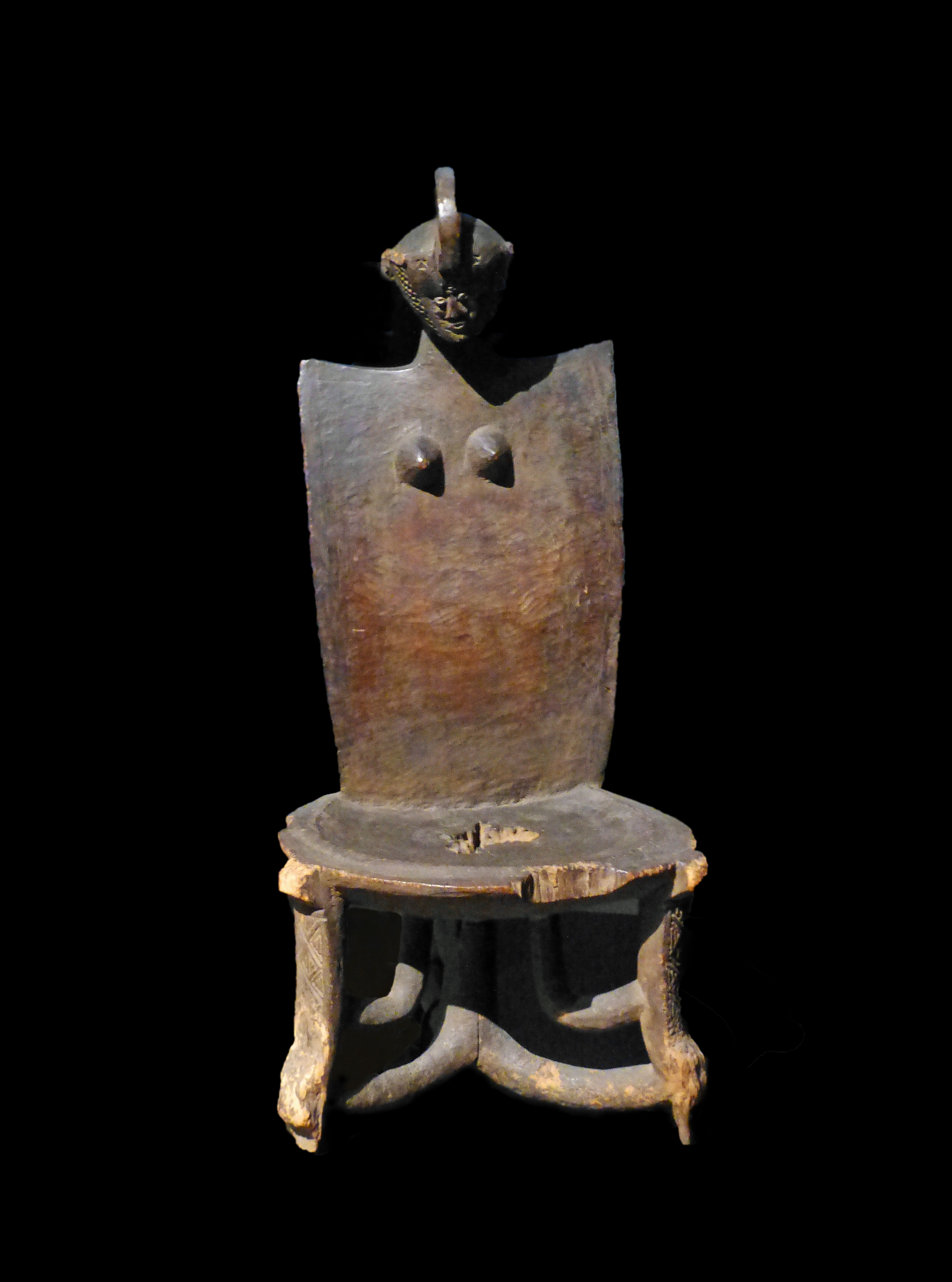
High-backed stool, Kami ethnic group, late 19th century, Musée des Confluences, Lyon

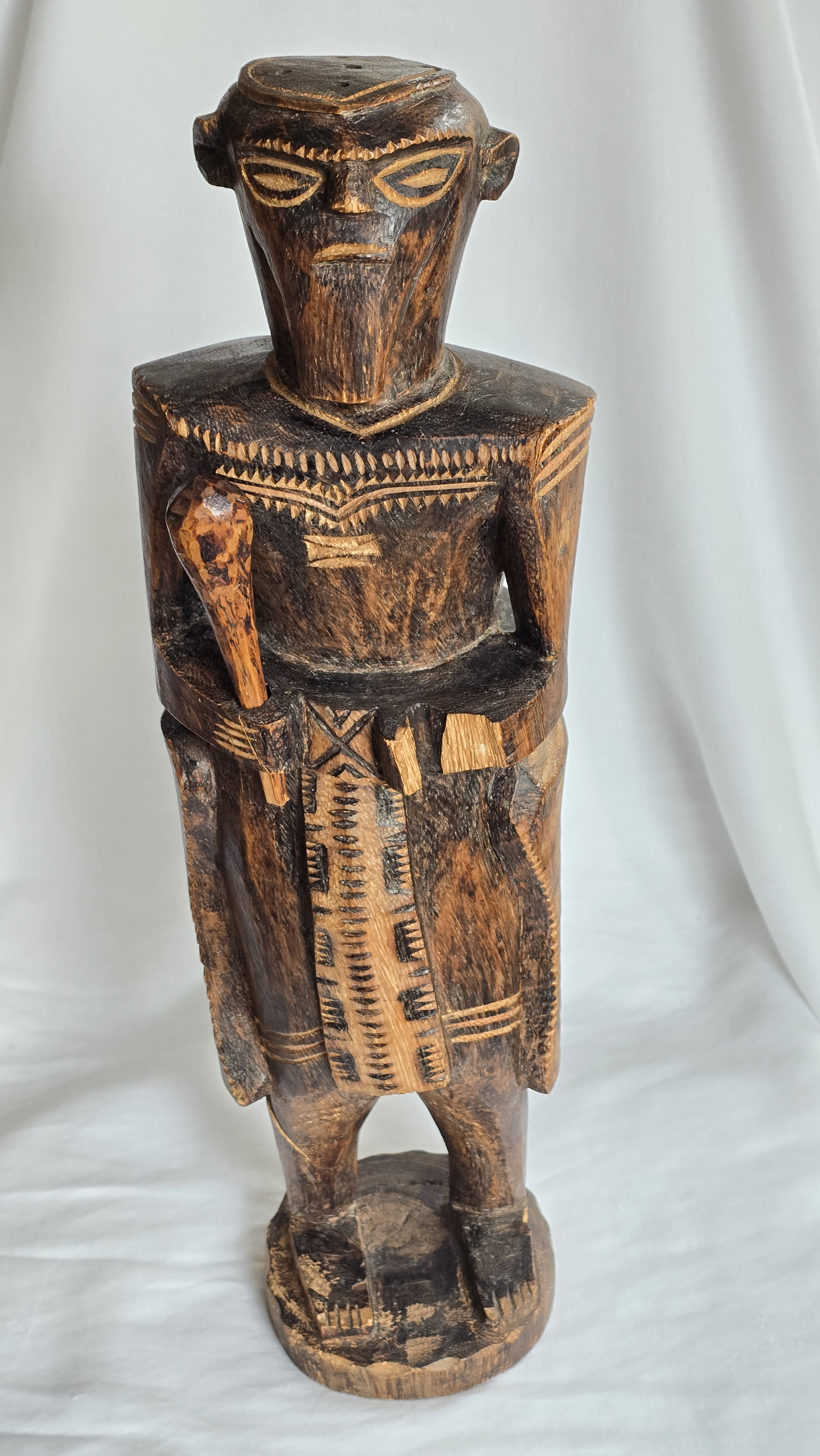
Farmingdale Statue; c. A.D. 1630 (radiocarbon dated); Cassia siamea wood; 51 cm height, 15 cm width at shoulders; private collection, United States. Attributed to the Zulu or another Nguni group of southeastern Africa; discovered in South Farmingdale, New York in 1961.

== See also ==
- African art
- African traditional masks
- Tribal art
- Contemporary African art
- Makonde art

== Literature ==
- Hugh Honour and John Fleming, A World History of Art, 1st ed. 1982 (many later editions), Macmillan, London, page refs to 1984 Macmillan 1st ed. paperback. ISBN 0333371852
