= Kwele people =

Central African tribe

The Kwele people, or Bakwele, are a tribal group of eastern Gabon, Republic of the Congo, and Cameroons in Central Africa. In terms of their language, they fall into the Bantu linguistic group. Their population consists of approximately 120,000 individuals. They fled the coastal area of West Africa during the 19th century after their traditional enemies acquired firearms from the slave traders. This altercation is often called the "Poupou" war. The Kwele then settled into lands between the Dja and Ivindo rivers. Their assumed five separate linguistic subgroups are identified by differences in where their community lies on a map, where they have migrated over time, political structure, performances implemented in rituals, and the community cohesion within each. When conflicts arise, their strategies to resolve these issues may be handled by intense individual competition. Important relations are impacted by the father's line of descent, due to past patrilineal and avuncular political decisions and relations.

The first ethnographic fieldwork related to the Kwele people did not occur until the early 1960s. Their art was recognized but information on the artists and the community was limited.

== Beete Rites ==
When misfortune such as famine, war, arguments, poor hunting, and death would strike the Kwele community, they would call upon powerful ancestors and request that they bring harmony back to the people. This purification rite is known as beete. This practice is overlooked by a specialists known as the gaa beete. To call upon ancestors to help, the community would offer them relics owned by a baaz. Baaz is a familial body of voters that have a say in village affairs. The gaa beete connects with the ancestors to decide if the relics presented have been accepted. If the relics are not accepted, the gaa beete would identify the person who does have the desired relic, even if this person is from a separate village. The relics are then drawn upon to make a stock for a medicinal brew. When completed, those who have suffered from the misfortune would ingest the brew or let it be sprinkled onto them. This was thought to be protection from any harm that was present. Now, every few years, the Kwele organize beete rites. They began to be practiced to prevent harm instead of only removing it when harm is present.

Flat masks were created to be incorporated into the beete rites. The bush spirit mask, kuk, leads the community in beete dances. These dances with the community help to strengthen the bond between everyone and also helped to honor ancestors. The energy produced from the community dancing was thought to heighten the power and effectiveness of the relics presented to the ancestors.

== Masks ==
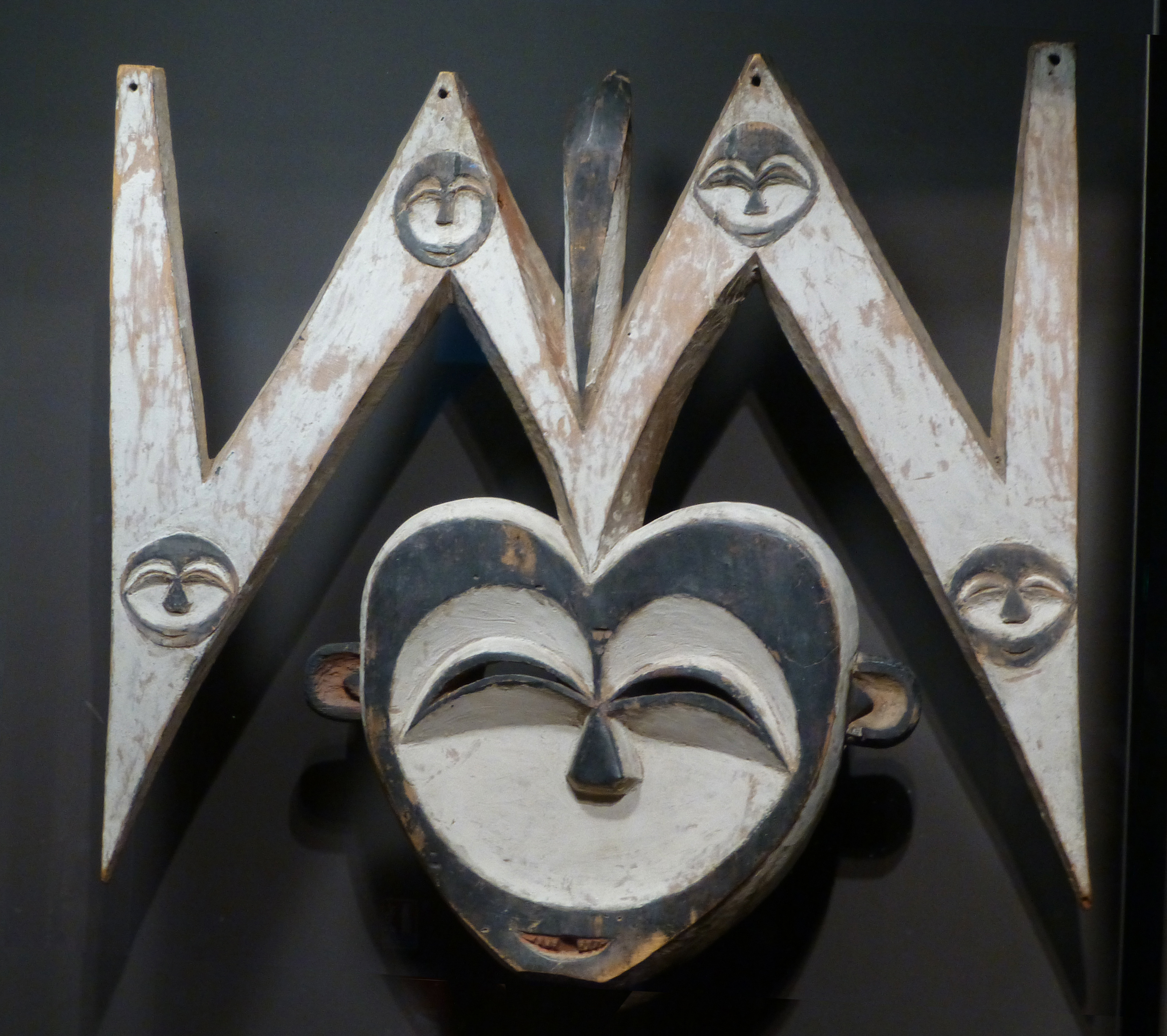
Kwele mask, Gabon. Muséum d'histoire naturelle de La Rochelle, France

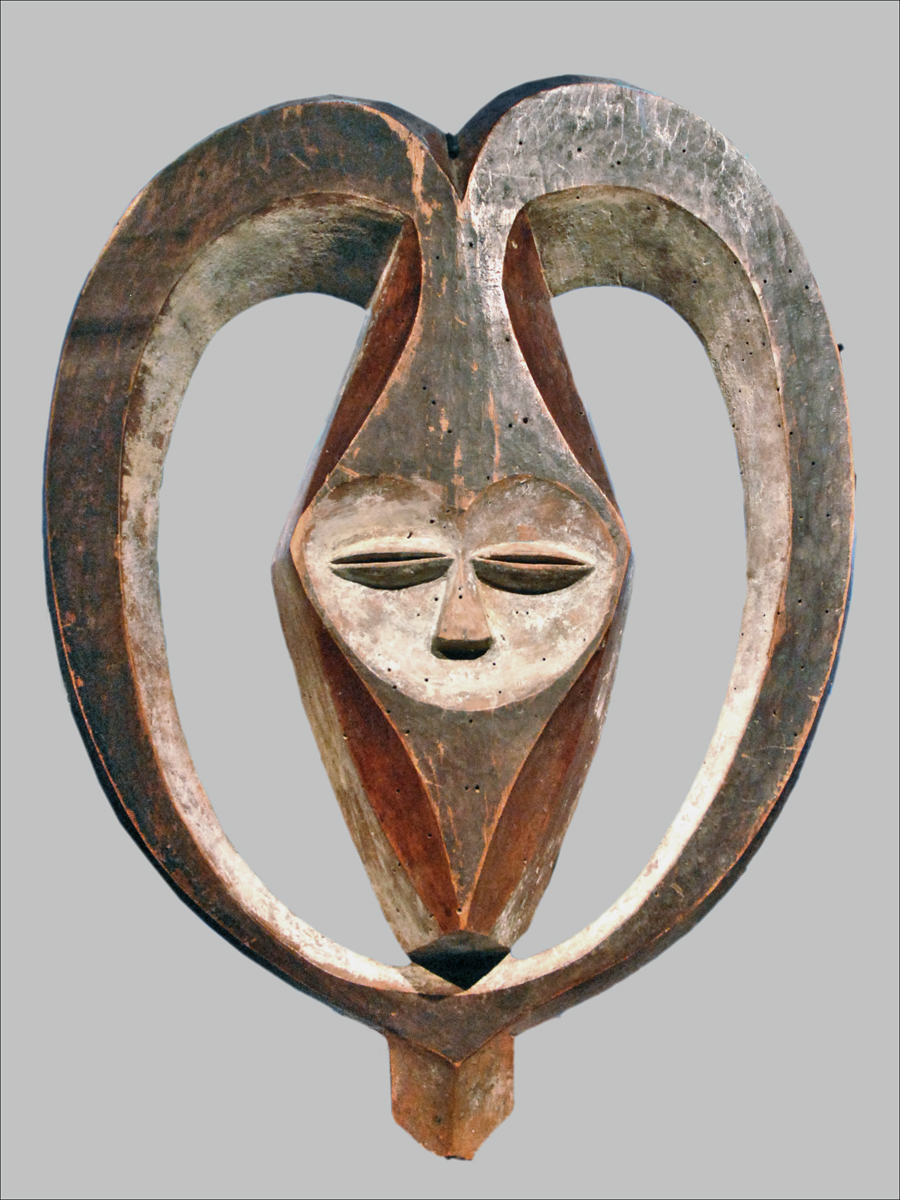
horned mask of pigmented wood, Musée du quai Branly, Paris

Masks are an art form for those in Africa. The shapes, sizes, engravings, color, materials added, and what ritual they are used in make each mask different from the next. Even though the Kwele masks embody a certain simplicity, they do not stray away from using animalistic, zoomorphic, and anthropomorphic features. Incorporating human features with animalistic helps merge humans with the forest spirits and the animals they live with. These are thought to represent benevolent forest spirits. Horns on a mask are present to honor the forest spirits who are linked with the presence of ancestors.

Many lack open eye slits and the masks are shown rather than worn. Some of their masks are painted with white kaolin clay, which the Kwele associate with light and clarity. Many of their masks are seen with concave features, suggesting that the masks were only to be viewed from the front.

Furthermore, not all masks are intended to be worn. Several Kwele masks are created with no eye slits, and therefore are used exclusively in ceremonies. The masks were often found in the homes of the elders. There are three categories of masks: Bush spirit masks, gon masks, and ngontangang. Bush spirit masks are seen as guardians. They often resemble the features of flying squirrels or owls. Gon masks tend to resemble a gorilla. The masks aim to have an aggressive and intimidating appearance. The one who wears the mask must embody mysterious and brave attributes.

=== Gon Mask ===
Gon arrives during the beete rites and this arrival is announced a day before his appearance at the village. The presence of gon brings a sense of ferociousness and bravery. The mask this masquerader wears is similar to a gorillas skull. The mask is designed to plant fear and amass admiration. Along with the mask, the one wearing it has their clothes covered in charcoal dust and is physically restricted. During the ritual, he will manage to get out of the bindings. He will proceed to make his way around the village, looking for prey.

=== Heart-shaped masks ===
A discernible mask from the Kwele and other people of the equatorial forest is the heart-shaped mask. The details featured on them are typical of Kwele masks. Usually made from flat or curved wood, this mask embodies features seen on monkeys, birds, butterflies, or the face of an ancestor. When worn in rituals, it pays homage to the ancestors. It ignites the collective memory of the community it performs before and pushes away evil spirits that live amongst them. This mask reaches its full potential while being used in rituals. The one wearing this mask may also be blanketed in things like leaves or bits of vegetables and cloth.

== Colonialism ==
Prior to the 1900s, the items created by the Kwele were not known of. Colonial missionaries who arrived in Africa came looking to trade things such as rubber and ivory. French equatorial Africa colonial administrator Aristide Courtois is known for the large amount of artifacts he brought to Europe from 1930 to 1933. Alongside him was collector Charles Ratton who helped bring viewers attention to the beauty of tribal art. In 1930, a Paris exhibition was held at the Pisalle Gallery, showcasing Kwele art.

The art and repertoires of multiple African communities were appreciated then heavily appropriated to develop a new wave of art mixed in with the new modernist avant-garde. Eventually birthing Cubism. Picasso's Les Demoiselles d'Avignon shows this use of pan African art composition and style. Artists wanted to challenge the mainstream art of the time. Long and concave facial features became popular in western sculpture and paintings after artists saw these characteristics in African art.
