= Joseph Mopepe Ngongo =

Congolese Catholic prelate (born 1966)

The Most Reverend Joseph Mopepe Ngongo
- Bishop of Molegbe, Democratic Republic of the Congo
- Church: Catholic Church
- Archdiocese: Roman Catholic Archdiocese of Mbandaka-Bikoro
- See: Roman Catholic Diocese of Molegbe
- Appointed: 15 April 2025
- Installed: 6 July 2025
- Predecessor: Dominique Bulamatari
- Successor: Incumbent

Orders
- Ordination: 19 March 1995
- Consecration: 6 July 2025 by Fridolin Ambongo Besungu
- Rank: Bishop

Personal details
- Born: Joseph Mopepe Ngongo; 15 July 1966 (age 59) Gemena, Diocese of Molegbe, Nord-Ubangi, Democratic Republic of the Congo
- Motto: "Ut Unum Sint" (That they may be one)

Styles of Joseph Mopepe Ngongo
- Reference style: Your Lordship; The Most Reverend
- Spoken style: His Lordship
- Religious style: Bishop

Joseph Mopepe Ngongo (born 15 July 1966) is a Congolese Catholic prelate who was appointed the bishop of the Roman Catholic Diocese of Molegbe in the Democratic Republic of the Congo since 25 April 2025. Before that, from 19 March 1995 until he was appointed bishop, he was a priest of the Diocese of Molegbe, in the Catholic Archdiocese of Mbandaka-Bikoro. He was appointed bishop on 25 April 2025 by Pope Francis. His consecration and installation at Molegbe took place on 6 July 2025.

== Background and education ==
He was born on 15 July 1966 in Gemena, diocese of Molegbe, Nord-Ubangi, Democratic Congo. He studied at the Saint François d’Assise Preparatory Seminary of Katokoli. He studied philosophy at the Saint Jean-Baptiste Major Seminary of Bamanya. He then entered the Université Catholique du Congo (Catholic University of the Congo) in Kinshasa, where he studied theology. In 2011 he began his studies for a doctorate in France. He returned to the DRC in 2024 to conclude his doctoral studies at the Catholic University of the Congo.

== Priest ==
He was ordained a priest of the Diocese of Molegbe on 19 March 1995. He served as a priest until 15 April 2025.

While a priest, he served in various roles and locations including:

- Studies at Université Catholique du Congo leading to the award of a licentiate in theology from the 1995 until 1997.
- Formator of the Saint Pierre et Saint Paul Interdiocesan Major Seminary in Lisala from 1997 until 2002.
- Rector of the Saint Pierre et Saint Paul Interdiocesan Major Seminary in Lisala from 2002 until 2011.
- Started studies leading to a doctorate degree in France in 2011
- Vicar of the Notre Dame Saint Jacques Cathedral in Reims, France from 2011 until 2021.
- Moderator of the parishes of the Espace missionnaire Sedan-Yvois from 2021 until 2024.
- Chaplain of the Equipes du Rosaire of the metropolitan archdiocese of Reims from 2021 until 2024.
- Studies at the Catholic University of the Congo leading to conclusion of doctorate degree since 2024.

== Bishop ==
On 15 April 2025, Pope Francis appointed Reverend Father Joseph Mopepe Ngongo as the local ordinary of the Catholic Diocese of Molegbe in the Metropolitan Ecclesiastical Province of Mbandaka-Bikoro. He was consecrated and installed at Molegbe, Democratic Republic of the Congo on 6 July 2025. The Principal Consecrator was Cardinal Fridolin Ambongo Besungu, Archbishop of Kinshasa assisted by Ernest Ngboko Ngombe, Archbishop of Mbandaka-Bikoro and Joseph-Bernard Likolo Bokal'Etumba, Bishop of Lisala.

== See also ==
- Catholic Church in the Democratic Republic of the Congo

== Succession table ==
Catholic Church titles
Preceded by Dominique Bulamatari Kizayakana (14 November 2009 - 1 August 2023)	Bishop-Elect of Molegbe (since 15 April 2025)	Succeeded by Incumbent
