= List of Catholic dioceses in the Democratic Republic of the Congo =

The Roman Catholic Church in the Democratic Republic of the Congo (formerly Belgian Congo, Zaire; also known as Congo-Kinshasa) is composed only of a Latin hierarchy, united in the national Episcopal Conference of the Democratic Republic of the Congo (French Conférence Episcopale Nationale du Congo (CENCO) ), comprising six ecclesiastical provinces, each under a Metropolitan Archbishop, and a total of 41 suffragan dioceses, each under a bishop.

There are no Eastern Catholic, pre-diocesan or other exempt jurisdictions.

There are no titular sees. The only defunct jurisdiction without proper current successor see, Diocese of Bikoro, is nevertheless preserved in its heir Mbandaka-Bikoro's title.

There is an Apostolic Nunciature to the Democratic Republic of Congo as papal diplomatic representation (embassy-level), in the national capital Kinshasa.

== Current Latin dioceses ==
=== Ecclesiastical Province of Bukavu ===
- Metropolitan Archdiocese of Bukavu
  - Diocese of Butembo-Beni
  - Diocese of Goma
  - Diocese of Kasongo
  - Diocese of Kindu
  - Diocese of Uvira

=== Ecclesiastical Province of Kananga ===
- Metropolitan Archdiocese of Kananga
  - Diocese of Kabinda
  - Diocese of Kole
  - Diocese of Luebo
  - Diocese of Luiza
  - Diocese of Mbujimayi
  - Diocese of Mweka
  - Diocese of Tshilomba
  - Diocese of Tshumbe

=== Ecclesiastical Province of Kinshasa ===
- Metropolitan Archdiocese of Kinshasa
  - Diocese of Boma
  - Diocese of Idiofa
  - Diocese of Inongo
  - Diocese of Kenge
  - Diocese of Kikwit
  - Diocese of Kisantu
  - Diocese of Matadi
  - Diocese of Popokabaka

=== Ecclesiastical Province of Kisangani ===
- Metropolitan Archdiocese of Kisangani
  - Diocese of Bondo
  - Diocese of Bunia
  - Diocese of Buta
  - Diocese of Doruma-Dungu
  - Diocese of Isangi
  - Diocese of Isiro-Niangara
  - Diocese of Mahagi-Nioka
  - Diocese of Wamba

=== Ecclesiastical Province of Lubumbashi ===
- Metropolitan Archdiocese of Lubumbashi
  - Diocese of Kalemie-Kirungu
  - Diocese of Kamina
  - Diocese of Kilwa-Kasenga
  - Diocese of Kolwezi
  - Diocese of Kongolo
  - Diocese of Manono
  - Diocese of Sakania-Kipushi

=== Ecclesiastical Province of Mbandaka-Bikoro ===
- Metropolitan Archdiocese of Mbandaka-Bikoro
  - Diocese of Basankusu
  - Diocese of Bokungu-Ikela
  - Diocese of Budjala
  - Diocese of Lisala
  - Diocese of Lolo
  - Diocese of Molegbe

== See also ==
- Catholic Church in the Democratic Republic of the Congo
- List of Catholic dioceses (structured view)

== Sources and external links ==
- GCatholic.org - date for all sections.
- Catholic-Hierarchy entry.
