= Joseph-Bernard Likolo =

Congolese Catholic prelate (born 1967)

The Most Reverend Joseph-Bernard Likolo
- Bishop of Lisala, Democratic Republic of the Congo
- Church: Catholic Church
- Archdiocese: Roman Catholic Archdiocese of Mbandaka-Bikoro
- See: Roman Catholic Diocese of Lisala
- Appointed: 15 February 2021
- Installed: 29 May 2021
- Predecessor: Ernest Ngboko Ngombe
- Successor: Incumbent
- Other post: Apostolic Administrator of the Diocese of Molegbe (since 1 August 2023)

Orders
- Ordination: 30 May 1999
- Consecration: 29 May 2021 by Fridolin Ambongo Besungu
- Rank: Bishop

Personal details
- Born: Joseph-Bernard Likolo Bokal'Etumba; 29 August 1967 (age 58) Kinshasa, Archdiocese of Kinshasa, Democratic Republic of the Congo

Styles of Joseph-Bernard Likolo Bokal'Etumba
- Reference style: Your Lordship; The Most Reverend
- Spoken style: His Lordship
- Religious style: Bishop

Joseph-Bernard Likolo Bokal'Etumba (born 29 August 1967) is a Congolese Catholic prelate who is the Bishop of the Roman Catholic Diocese of Lisala in the Democratic Republic of the Congo since 15 February 2021. Before that, from 30 May 1999 until he was appointed bishop, he was a priest of the Roman Catholic Archdiocese of Kinshasa. He was appointed bishop on 15 February 2021 by Pope Francis. He was consecrated as bishop on 29 May 2021. On 1 August 2023, he was appointed Apostolic Administrator of the Roman Catholic Diocese of Molegbe, to serve until a suitable bishop is appointed. He is a member of the Emmanuel Community.

== Background and education ==
He was born on 29 August 1967 in Kinshasa, Democratic Congo. From 1987 until 1988 he studied at the Preparatory Seminary in Kinshasa. He studied philosophy at the Saint André Kaggwa Major Seminary, in Kinshasa from 1988 until 1991. He then studied theology at the Saint Jean XXIII Grand Séminaire de Theologie, also in Kinshasa from 1991 until 1996. From 1996 until 1999, he underwent a pastoral internship at the Sainte Angèle Parish in Kinshasa. He then obtained a Licentiate in theology from the Institut Catholique de Paris, France having studied there from 2004 until 2008. He also holds a Doctorate in liturgy from the Pontifical Athenaeum of Saint Anselm in Rome, Italy where he studied from 2008 until 2013.

== Priest ==
On 30 May 1999, he was ordained a priest of the Roman Catholic Archdiocese of Kinshasa. He served as priest until 15 February 2021.

While a priest, he served in various roles including as:

- Vicar of Sainte Angèle Parish from 1999 until 2004.
- Parish priest of Sainte Angèle Parish from 1999 until 2004.
- Director of Sainte Angèle Primary School 1996 until 2004.
- Studies at the Institut Catholique de Paris, France from 2004 until 2008.
- Studies at the Pontifical Athenaeum of Saint Anselm in Rome from 2008 until 2013.
- Referent for vocations, seminarians and priests of the Emmanuel Community in the Democratic Republic of the Congo, since 2010.
- Lecturer in liturgy at the Grand Séminaire de Theologie Saint Jean XXIII from 2013 until 2021.
- Director of the Maison Jean-Jacques Olier for the formation and accompaniment of priests in difficulty from 2014 until 2020.
- Secretary of the Episcopal Commission for Divine Worship and the Discipline of the Sacraments of the Episcopal Conference of the Democratic Republic of the Congo (Conferénce Episcopale Nationale du Congo) (CENCO), from 2016 until 2021.

== Bishop ==
Pope Francis appointed him Bishop of the Roman Catholic Diocese of Lisala on 15 February 2021. He was consecrated and installed at Lisala on 29 May 2021 by the hands of Cardinal Fridolin Ambongo Besungu, Archbishop of Kinshasa assisted by Archbishop Ettore Balestrero, Titular Archbishop of Victoriana and Archbishop Ernest Ngboko Ngombe, Archbishop of Mbandaka-Bikoro.

Following the resignation of Bishop Dominique Bulamatari Kizayakana from the pastoral care of the Roman Catholic Diocese of Molegbe on 1 August 2023, The Holy See appointed Bishop Joseph-Bernard Likolo Bokal'Etumba, the Local Ordinary of the Diocese of Lisala as Apostolic Administrator at Molegbe. That administratorship is expected to cease on 6 July 2025 when a new bishop Joseph Mopepe Ngongo is installed there.

== See also ==
- Catholic Church in the Democratic Republic of the Congo

== Succession table ==
Catholic Church titles
Preceded by Ernest Ngboko Ngombe (11 February 2015 - 23 November 2019)	Bishop of Lisala (since 15 February 2021)	Succeeded by Incumbent
