= Libère Pwongo Bope =

Congolese Catholic prelate (born in 1964)

The Most Reverend Libère Pwongo Bope
- Bishop of Basankusu, Democratic Republic of the Congo
- Church: Catholic Church
- Archdiocese: Roman Catholic Archdiocese of Mbandaka-Bikoro
- See: Roman Catholic Diocese of Basankusu
- Appointed: 11 November 2023
- Installed: 16 December 2023
- Predecessor: Joseph Mokobe Ndjoku
- Successor: Incumbent

Orders
- Ordination: 4 January 1992
- Consecration: 16 December 2023 by Cardinal Fridolin Ambongo Besungu
- Rank: Bishop

Personal details
- Born: Libère Pwongo Bope; 21 May 1964 (age 61) Mweka, Diocese of Mweka, Kasaï Province, Democratic Republic of the Congo

Styles of Libère Pwongo Bope
- Reference style: Your Lordship; The Most Reverend
- Spoken style: His Lordship
- Religious style: Archbishop

Libère Pwongo Bope (born 21 May) is a Congolese Catholic prelate who serves as Bishop of the Roman Catholic Diocese of Basankusu, in the Ecclesiastical Metropolitan Province of Mbandaka-Bikoro in the Democratic Republic of the Congo, since 11 November 2023. Before that, from 4 January 1992 until he was appointed bishop, he was a priest of the Roman Catholic Archdiocese of Kinshasa, in the Democratic Congo. He was appointed bishop on 11 November 2023 by Pope Francis. He was consecrated and installed at Basankusu, Democratic Republic of the Congo, on 16 December 2023.

== Background and education ==
He was born on 21 May 1964 in Mweka, Diocese of Mweka, Kasaï Province, in the DR Congo. He studied philosophy at the Saint André Kaggwa Major Seminary in Kinshasa. He then studied theology at the Saint Jean XXIII Major Seminary, also in Kinshasa. He holds a Licentiate in philosophy obtained in Kinshasa, where he studied from 1991 until 1993. From 2007 until 2013, he studied at the Institut Catholique de Paris, where he graduated with a Doctorate in philosophy.

== Priest ==
He was ordained a priest on 4 January 1992 for the archdiocese of Kinshasa. He served as priest until 11 November 2023.

While a priest, he served in various roles and locations including as:

- Studies leading to a licentiate in philosophy in Kinshasa from 1991 until 1993.
- Professor and formator in the Saint André Kaggwa Major Seminary from 1993 until 1996.
- Academic secretary in the Saint André Kaggwa Major Seminary from 1996 until 1999.
- Private secretary to the archbishop of Kinshasa from 1993 until 1999.
- Chancellor-secretary of the archdiocese of Kinshasa from 1999 until 2006.
- Administrator of the Saint Paul Parish in Évry, France from 2007 until 2012.
- Studies leading to the award of a Doctorate in philosophy from the Institut Catholique de Paris from 2007 until 2013.
- Rector of the Saint André Kaggwa Major Seminary from 2013 until 2020.
- Professor at the Université Catholique du Congo from 2013 until 2020.
- Parish priest of Saint Albert Parish in Kinshasa from 2020 until 2021.
- Missionary (fidei donum) in the Central African Republic and parish priest in the Roman Catholic Archdiocese of Bangui from 2021 until 2023.
- Chancellor secretary of the Archdiocese of Kinshasa in 2023.

== As bishop ==
On 11 November 2023, Pope Francis accepted the resignation from the pastoral care of the diocese of Basankusu, Democratic Republic of the Congo, presented by Bishop Joseph Mokobe Ndjoku. The Holy Father appointed Reverend Father Libère Pwongo Bope, previously a member of the clergy of Kinshasa as the new Local Ordinary of Basankusu. He was consecrated and installed at Basankusu, on 16 December 2023 by the hands of Cardinal Fridolin Ambongo Besungu, Archbishop of Kinshasa assisted by Archbishop Ernest Ngboko Ngombe, Archbishop of Mbandaka-Bikoro and Bishop Joseph Mokobe Ndjoku, Bishop Emeritus of Basankusu.

== See also ==
- Catholic Church in the Democratic Republic of the Congo

Catholic Church titles
Preceded by Joseph Mokobe Ndjoku (9 November 2001 - 11 November 2023)	Bishop of Basankusu (since 11 November 2023)	Succeeded by Incumbent
