= Dominique Bulamatari =

Congolese Roman Catholic bishop (1955–2024)

His Excellency Dominique Bulamatari
- Bishop Emeritus of Molegbe
- Archdiocese: Mbandaka-Bikoro
- Diocese: Molegbe
- Appointed: 14 November 2009
- Term ended: 1 August 2023
- Predecessor: Ignace Matondo Kwa Nzambi
- Successor: Vacant
- Previous posts: Auxiliary Bishop of Kinshasa and Titular Bishop of Elephantaria in Mauretania (1999–2009)

Orders
- Ordination: 20 April 1980 by Joseph-Albert Malula
- Consecration: 30 January 2000 by Frédéric Etsou-Nzabi-Bamungwabi

Personal details
- Born: 4 June 1955 Léopoldville, Belgian Congo
- Died: 26 August 2024 (aged 69) Kinshasa, Democratic Republic of the Congo

Dominique Bulamatari (4 June 1955 – 26 August 2024) was a Congolese Roman Catholic prelate. Bulamatari served as the auxiliary bishop of the Roman Catholic Archdiocese of Kinshasa from 1999 until 2009. In 2009, he was appointed Bishop of the Roman Catholic Diocese of Molegbe, based in the northern city of Molegbe, where he served until his resignation and retirement on 1 August 2023.

== Biography ==
Bulamatari was born in Léopoldville (present-day Kinshasa) on 4 June 1955. He was ordained a Catholic priest in the Archdiocese of Kinshasa in April 1980.

He was appointed auxiliary bishop of the Roman Catholic Archdiocese of Kinshasa in October 1999 and assigned as the titular bishop of Elephantaria in Mauretania. His ordination as auxiliary bishop was held in January 2000. He was then appointed Bishop of the Roman Catholic Diocese of Molegbe in November 2009, succeeding outgoing Bishop Ignace Matondo Kwa Nzambi.

Pope Francis accepted Bishop Bulamatari's resignation on 1 August 2023, though no specific reason for his departure was made public at the time.

Bulamatari died in Kinshasa on 26 August 2024, at the age of 69. His death was announced by Cardinal Fridolin Ambongo Besungu.

Catholic Church titles
Preceded by Ignace Matondo Kwa Nzambi	Bishop of Molegbe; 2009–2023	Succeeded by Vacant
Preceded by Gilberto Délio Gonçalves Canavarro dos Reis	Titular Bishop of Elephantaria in Mauretania; 1999–2009	Succeeded by Angelo Moreschi
Preceded by —	Auxiliary Bishop of Kinshasa; 1999–2009	Succeeded by —
