= Toussaint Iluku Bolumbu =

Congolese Catholic prelate (born in 1964)

The Most Reverend Toussaint Iluku Bolumbu
- Bishop of Bokungu-Ikela, Democratic Republic of the Congo
- Church: Catholic Church
- Archdiocese: Roman Catholic Archdiocese of Mbandaka-Bikoro
- See: Roman Catholic Diocese of Bokungu-Ikela
- Appointed: 13 May 2019
- Installed: 21 July 2019
- Predecessor: Fridolin Ambongo Besungu
- Successor: Incumbent

Orders
- Ordination: 23 July 1995 by Joseph Mokobe Ndjoku
- Consecration: 21 July 2019 by Fridolin Ambongo Besungu
- Rank: Bishop

Personal details
- Born: Toussaint Iluku Bolumbu; 18 November 1964 (age 61) Monieka, Archdiocese of Mbandaka-Bikoro, Equateur Province, Democratic Republic of the Congo
- Motto: "Verba vitae aeternae habes" (You have the words of eternal life)

Styles of Toussaint Iluku Bolumbu
- Reference style: Your Lordship; The Most Reverend
- Spoken style: His Lordship
- Religious style: Archbishop

Toussaint Iluku Bolumbu M.S.C. (born 18 November 1964) is a Congolese Catholic prelate who serves as Bishop of the Roman Catholic Diocese of Bokungu-Ikela, in the Ecclesiastical Metropolitan Province of Mbandaka-Bikoro in the Democratic Republic of the Congo, since 13 May 2019. Before that, from 23 July 1995 until he was appointed bishop, he was a priest of the Order of the Missionaries of the Sacred Heart of Jesus. He was appointed bishop on 13 May 2019 by Pope Francis. He was consecrated and installed at Bokungu, Democratic Republic of the Congo, on 21 July 2019.

== Background and education ==
Bolumbu was born on 18 November 1964 in Monieka, Archdiocese of Mbandaka-Bikoro, Equateur Province, in the Democratic Congo. He is the seventh born in a family of eleven siblings. He holds Bachelor's degrees in both Philosophy and Theology. He also holds a Licentiate in spiritual theology, awarded by the Pontifical Gregorian University, in Rome, Italy.

== Priest ==
In 1994, Bolumbu took his perpetual vows as a member of the Order of the Missionaries of the Sacred Heart of Jesus. He was ordained a priest of that religious Order on 23 July 1995. He served as priest until 13 May 2019.

While a priest, Bolumbu served in various roles and locations including as:

- Parish priest.
- Vice rector.
- Bursar.
- Superior of formation of the MSC School in Yaoundé, Cameroon.
- Director of formation of the MSC School in Yaoundé, Cameroon.
- Lecturer of philosophy and theology.
- Vice president of the Association of Major Superiors of the ecclesiastical province of Mbandaka-Bikoro.
- Assistant to the secretary general of the General Chapter of the Missionaries of the Sacred Heart in Rome.
- Moderator of the General Conference of Missionaries of the Sacred Heart in Yaoundé.

== As bishop ==
On 13 May 2019, Pope Francis appointed Bolumbu, previously the superior of the Missionaries of the Sacred Heart for the French-speaking African region, as the new Local Ordinary of Bokungu-Ikela.

Bolumbu was consecrated and installed at Bokungu, on 21 July 2019 by the hands of Archbishop Fridolin Ambongo Besungu, Archbishop of Kinshasa assisted by Archbishop Ettore Balestrero, Titular Archbishop of Victoriana and Bishop Emery Kibal Nkufi Mansong'loo, Bishop of Kole.

== See also ==
- Catholic Church in the Democratic Republic of the Congo

== Succession table ==
Catholic Church titles
Preceded by Fridolin Ambongo Besungu (22 November 2004 - 6 March 2018)	Bishop of Bokungu-Ikela (since 13 May 2019)	Succeeded by Incumbent
