= Edouard Kisonga Ndinga =

Congolese Roman Catholic bishop (1946–2025)

His Excellency Edouard Kisonga Ndinga
- Auxiliary Bishop Emeritus of Kinshasa
- Archdiocese: Kinshasa
- Appointed: 29 October 1999
- Term ended: 30 January 2022
- Other post: Titular Bishop of Grumentum (1999–2025)

Orders
- Ordination: 7 June 1981
- Consecration: 30 January 2000 by Frédéric Etsou-Nzabi-Bamungwabi

Personal details
- Born: 26 April 1946 Kisantu, Belgian Congo
- Died: 20 August 2025 (aged 79) Kinshasa, DR Congo

Edouard Kisonga Ndinga (26 April 1946 – 20 August 2025) was a Congolese Roman Catholic prelate.

== Biography ==
Kisonga Ndinga was ordained a priest on 7 June 1981. Pope John Paul II appointed him auxiliary bishop of Kinshasa and titular bishop of Grumentum on 29 October 1999. The Archbishop of Kinshasa, Cardinal Frédéric Etsou-Nzabi-Bamungwabi CICM, consecrated him bishop on 30 January of the following year at the Stade des Martyrs in Kinshasa; Co-consecrators were Archbishop Francisco-Javier Lozano, Apostolic Nuncio to the Democratic Republic of Congo, and Eugène Moke Motsüri, Auxiliary Bishop Emeritus of Kinshasa.

On 30 January 2022, Pope Francis accepted his retirement due to age.

Kisonga Ndinga died on 20 August 2025, at the age of 79.

Catholic Church titles
Preceded by —	Auxiliary Bishop of Kinshasa; 1999–2022	Succeeded by —
Preceded by Đuro Kokša	Titular Bishop of Grumentum; 1999–2025	Succeeded by Vacant
