= Ernest Ngboko Ngombe =

Congolese Catholic prelate (born in 1964)

The Most Reverend Ernest Ngboko Ngombe
- Archbishop of Mbandaka-Bikoro, Democratic Republic of the Congo
- Church: Catholic Church
- Archdiocese: Roman Catholic Archdiocese of Mbandaka-Bikoro
- See: Mbandaka-Bikoro
- Appointed: 23 November 2019
- Installed: 26 January 2020
- Predecessor: Fridolin Ambongo Besungu
- Successor: Incumbent

Orders
- Ordination: 20 June 1996 by Cardinal Hyacinthe Thiandoum
- Consecration: 19 April 2015 by Louis Nkinga Bondala
- Rank: Archbishop

Personal details
- Born: Ernest Ngboko Ngombe; 25 May 1964 (age 62) Kanya Mbonda, Diocese of Lisala, Province of Équateur, Democratic Republic of the Congo
- Motto: "Cor Unum et anima una" ("One heart and one soul")

Styles of Ernest Ngboko Ngombe
- Reference style: Your Lordship; The Most Reverend
- Spoken style: His Lordship
- Religious style: Archbishop

Ernest Ngboko Ngombe C.I.C.M. (born 25 May 1964) is a Congolese Catholic prelate who serves as Archbishop of the Roman Catholic Archdiocese of Mbandaka-Bikoro, in the Democratic Republic of the Congo, since 23 November 2019. Before that, from 11 February 2015 until he was appointed archbishop, he was Bishop of the Roman Catholic Diocese of Lisala in the Metropolitan Province of Mbandaka-Bikoro. He was appointed bishop on 11 February 2015 by Pope Francis. He was consecrated and installed at Lisala, Democratic Republic of the Congo, on 26 January 2020. While Archbishop, he served as Apostolic Administrator of the Diocese of Lisala from 23 November 2019 until 29 May 2021.

== Background and education ==
He was born on 25 May 1964, in Kanya Mbonda, Diocese of Lisala, Province of Équateur, in the Democratic Congo. He studied philosophy at the Saint Augustin Ngoya Institute, in Yaounde, Cameroon from 1988 until 1990. He then studied Theology at the Saint Cyprien Institute in Ngoya, also in Yaoundé, Cameroon from 1990 until 1994. In 2011, he undertook advanced studies in theology at the Catholic Theological Union (CTS), in Chicago, Illinois, in the United States.

== Priest ==
On 17 October 1987, he took his perpetual vows as a member of the Order of the Congregation of the Immaculate Heart of Mary. He was ordained a priest of that religious Order on 20 June 1996, in Dakar, Senegal by the hands of Cardinal Hyacinthe Thiandoum, Archbishop of Dakar. He served as priest until 11 February 2015.

While a priest, he served in various roles and locations including as:

- Missionary in Senegal from 1996 until 2010.
- Assistant priest and then parish priest of Saint Abraham Parish in Guediawaye, outside Dakar from 2001 until 2010.
- Superior of the Autonomous District of CICM Missionaries of Senegal for three consecutive terms from 2001 until 2010.
- Studies in Theology at the Catholic Theological Union, in Chicago, Illinois, in the United States from 2010 until 2011.
- Rector of the Theological Seminary in Cameroon in 2011.
- Coordinator of the CICM Missionaries for the Region of Africa in 2011.
- Vicar General of the CICM Congregation from 2011 until 2015.

== As bishop ==
On 11 February 2015, Pope Francis appointed Reverend Father Ernest Ngboko Ngombe, previously the Vicar General of the Congregation of the Immaculate Heart of Mary as the new Local Ordinary of Lisala. He was consecrated and installed at Lisala, on 19 April 2015 by the hands of Bishop Louis Nkinga Bondala, Bishop Emeritus of Lisala assisted by Archbishop Joseph Kumuondala Mbimba, Archbishop of Mbandaka-Bikoro and Bishop Joseph Mokobe Ndjoku, Bishop of Basankusu.

On 23 November 2019, The Holy Father elevated him to Archbishop and transferred him to the Roman Catholic Archdiocese of Mbandaka-Bikoro. He was installed there on 26 January 2020. He served as Apostolic Administrator of the Diocese of Lisala from 23 November 2019 until 29 May 2021, while archbishop at Mbandaka-Bikoro.

== See also ==
- Catholic Church in the Democratic Republic of the Congo

== Succession table ==
Catholic Church titles
Preceded by Louis Nkinga Bondala (6 July 1997 - 11 February 2015)	Bishop of Lisala (11 February 2015 - 23 November 2019)	Succeeded by Joseph-Bernard Likolo Bokal'Etumba (15 February 2021)
Preceded by Fridolin Ambongo Besungu (12 November 2016 - 6 February 2018)	Archbishop of Mbandaka-Bikoro (since 23 November 2019)	Succeeded by Incumbent
