= Diocese of Basankusu =

Roman Catholic diocese in the Democratic Republic of the Congo

Coordinates: 1.2204°N 19.8029°E

Diocese of Basankusu Dioecesis Basankusuensis

Location
- Country: Democratic Republic of the Congo
- Metropolitan: Mbandaka-Bikoro

Statistics
- Area: 70,000 km^{2} (27,000 sq mi)
- Population: Total; Catholics: (as of 2006); 584,000; 230,331 (39.4%)

Information
- Rite: Latin Rite

Current leadership
- Pope: Leo XIV
- Bishop: Libère Pwongo Bope
- Auxiliary Bishops: Joseph Mokobe Ndjoku

The Roman Catholic Diocese of Basankusu (Latin: Basankusuen(sis)) is a Latin suffragan diocese in the ecclesiastical province of the Metropolitan Mbandaka-Bikoro in the Democratic Republic of the Congo.

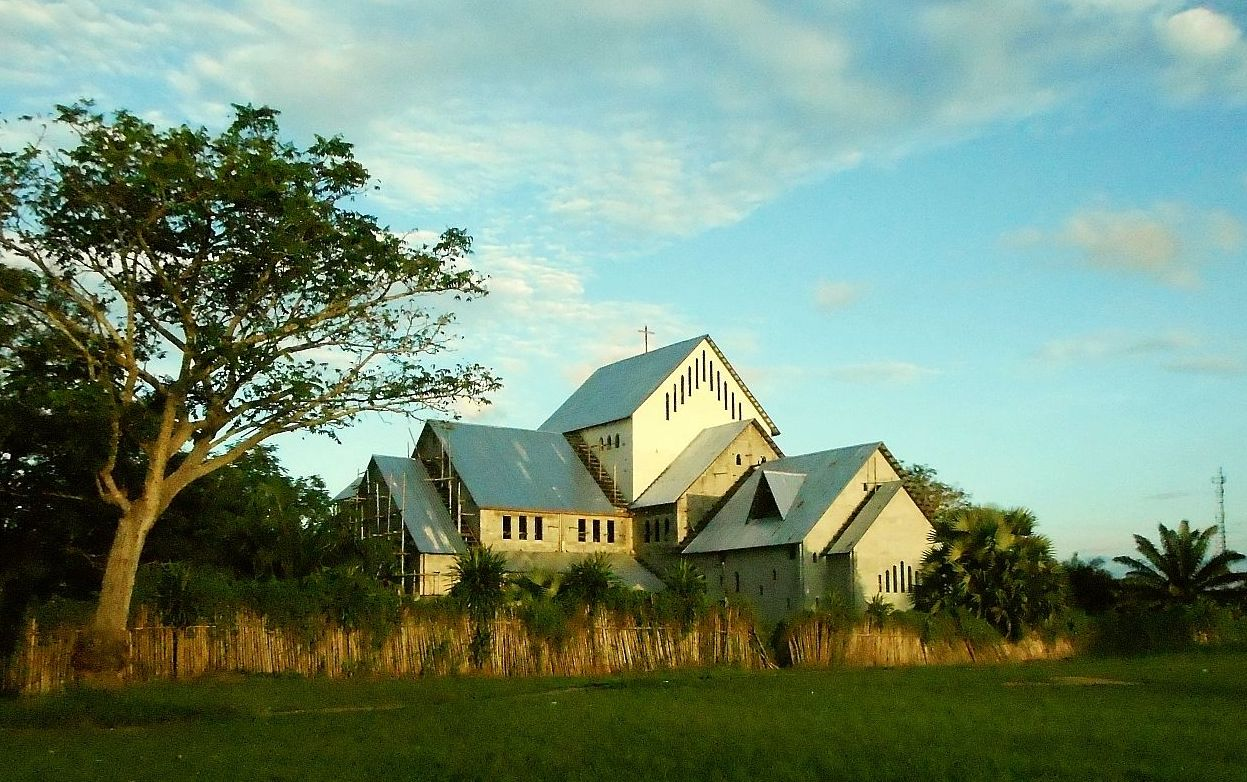
The rebuilt Basankusu Cathedral

Its cathedral episcopal see is Cathédrale Saints-Pierre-et-Paul (Saints Peter and Paul) in the town of Basankusu.

== History ==
- Established on 28 July 1926, as Apostolic Prefecture of Basankusu on territory split off from the then Apostolic Vicariate of Nouvelle-Anvers
- 8 January 1948: Promoted as Apostolic Vicariate of Basankusu
- Lost territory on 14 June 1951 to establish the then Apostolic Prefecture of Isangi (now a diocese)
- Promoted on 10 November 1959, as Diocese of Basankusu, ceasing to be exempt

== Ordinaries ==
(all Latin Rite, mostly -initially missionary- members of Latin congregations)

Apostolic Prefects of Basankusu

- Gerardo Wantenaar, Mill Hill Missionaries (M.H.M.) (2 February 1927 – 8 January 1948 see below)

Apostolic Vicars of Basankusu

- Gerardo Wantenaar, M.H.M., Titular Bishop of Uzalis (8 July 1948 – 3 December 1951) (see above 8 January 1948 – 3 December 1951)
- Willem van Kester, M.H.M., Titular Bishop of Legia (19 June 1952 – 10 November 1959 see below)

Bishops of Basankusu

- Willem van Kester, M.H.M. (see above 10 November 1959 – 18 November 1974)
- Ignace Matondo Kwa Nzambi, Scheutists (C.I.C.M.) (18 November 1974 – 27 June 1998), appointed Bishop of Molegbe
- Joseph Mokobe Ndjoku (9 November 2001 - 11 November 2023), previously Apostolic Administrator (1998 – 9 November 2001) while Bishop of Bokungu–Ikela (Democratic Republic of Congo) (6 December 1993 – 9 November 2001)
- Libère Pwongo Bope (since 11 November 2023)

== See also ==
- Roman Catholicism in the Democratic Republic of the Congo

== Sources and external links ==
- Giga-Catholic Information
- Catholic Hierarchy
