= Ignace Matondo Kwa Nzambi =

Ignace Matondo Kwa Nzambi C.I.C.M.
- Bishop of Molegbe
- Church: Catholic Church
- Diocese: Diocese of Molegbe
- In office: 27 June 1998 – 23 May 2007
- Predecessor: Joseph Kesenge Wandangakongu
- Successor: Dominique Bulamatari
- Previous post: Bishop of Basankusu (1974-1998)

Orders
- Ordination: 2 August 1964
- Consecration: 13 April 1975 by Joseph Malula

Personal details
- Born: 12 April 1932 Bwamanda (west of Gemena), Équateur Province, Belgian Congo, Belgian Empire
- Died: 9 September 2011 (aged 79)

Ignace Matondo Kwa Nzambi (12 April 1932 – 9 September 2011) was the Roman Catholic bishop of the Roman Catholic Diocese of Molegbe, Democratic Republic of the Congo.

Ordained to the priesthood in 1964, Matondo Kwa Nzambi was appointed bishop of the Basankusu Diocese in 1974. In 1998, he was appointed bishop of the Molegbe Diocese, retiring in 2007.
