= Episcopal Conference of the Democratic Republic of the Congo =

National assembly of Catholic bishops

The National Episcopal Conference of the Congo (French: Conférence Épiscopale Nationale du Congo or CENCO) is the national episcopal conference of the Democratic Republic of the Congo. The conference is a member of the Association of Episcopal Conferences of Central Africa and the Symposium of Episcopal Conferences of Africa and Madagascar (SECAM).

List of presidents of the conference:

- Vito Roberti, Apostolic Delegate, 1962–1963
- Félix Scalais, Archbishop of Kinshasa, 1963–1964
- Aloys Mulindwa Mutabesha, Archbishop of Bukavu, 1967–1970
- Léon Lesambo Ndamwize, Bishop of Inongo, 1970–1975
- Albert Tshomba Yungu, Bishop of Tshumbe, 1975–1979
- André Ilunga Kaseba, Bishop of Kalemie–Kirungu, 1979–1984
- Laurent Monsengwo Pasinya, Archbishop of Kisangani, 1984–1992
- Faustin Ngabu, Bishop of Goma, 1992–2000
- Frédéric Etsou-Nzabi-Bamungwabi, Archbishop of Kinshasa, 2000–2004
- Laurent Monsengwo Pasinya, Archbishop of Kisangani, Archbishop of Kinshasa, 2004–2008
- Nicolas Djomo Lola, Bishop of Tshumbe, 2008–2016
- Marcel Utembi Tapa, Archbishop of Kisangani, 2016–present

== See also ==
- Catholic Church in the Democratic Republic of the Congo
