= Joseph Kesenge Wandangakongu =

Congolese bishop (1928–2021)

- Bishop of Molegbe
- Church: Catholic Church
- Diocese: Diocese of Molegbe
- In office: 5 September 1968 – 18 October 1997
- Predecessor: Léon Delaere
- Successor: Ignace Matondo Kwa Nzambi

Orders
- Ordination: 20 July 1957
- Consecration: 25 January 1969 by Pierre Wijnants

Personal details
- Born: 4 April 1928 Molegbe, Équateur Province, Belgian Congo, Belgian Empire
- Died: 19 February 2021 (aged 92) Gbadolite, Nord-Ubangi, Democratic Republic of the Congo

Joseph Kesenge Wandangakongu (4 April 1928, Molegbe – 19 February 2021, Gbadolite) was the Democratic Republic of the Congo Roman Catholic bishop of the Roman Catholic Diocese of Molegbe.

Wandangakongu was born in the Democratic Republic of the Congo and was ordained to the priesthood in 1957. He served as bishop of the Diocese of Molegbe from 1969 until 1997.
