= Our Lady of the Congo Cathedral =

Coordinates: 4°19′25.8″S 15°17′40.0″E

- Cathédrale Notre-Dame du Congo
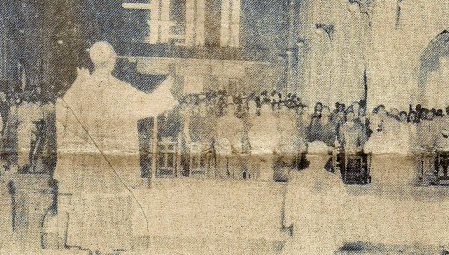
- Catholic ceremony, 1961
- Our Lady of the Congo Cathedral
- Location: Lingwala, Kinshasa
- Country: Democratic Republic of the Congo
- Denomination: Catholic Church

Administration
- Diocese: Roman Catholic Archdiocese of Kinshasa

Clergy
- Bishop: Fridolin Ambongo Besungu

Our Lady of the Congo Cathedral (French: Cathédrale Notre-Dame du Congo), or simply Kinshasa Cathedral, is a religious building of the Catholic Church located on Liberation Avenue (formerly also called November 24 Avenue) in the city of Kinshasa, the capital and largest city of the African country of the Democratic Republic of Congo.

This massive church in Kishana was built in 1947 when the country was still called the Belgian Congo, being still under the colonial rule of Belgium. During the government of Mobutu, the structure was also called "Cathedral of Our Lady of Lingwala" for the place where the temple is located, since both names coexist.

The temple follows the Roman or Latin rite and functions as the headquarters of the Metropolitan Archdiocese of Kinshasa (Archidioecesis Kinshasana) which was created in 1959 by the Bull "Cum parvulum" of the Pope John XXIII.

== See also ==
- Roman Catholicism in the Democratic Republic of the Congo
