= University of Lisala =

- Université de Lisala
- Type: Public university
- Rector: Prof Abbé Donat Tebakabe Alomo
- Location: Lisala, Mongala, Democratic Republic of the Congo
- Language: French
- Website: Official website

The University of Lisala is a public university in the Democratic Republic of the Congo, located in Lisala, Mongala province. The language of instruction is French.

== Faculties ==
- Faculty of Economics and Management Sciences
- Faculty of Legal, Political, and Administrative Sciences
- Faculty of Psychological and Educational Sciences
- Faculty of Health Sciences
- Faculty of Science and Technology
- Faculty of Agronomic and Environmental Sciences
- Faculty of Humanities and Social Sciences

== Research Center ==
- International Center for Multidisciplinary Research

== See also ==
- List of universities in the Democratic Republic of the Congo
