= Attanasus =

Attanus was a Roman city and bishopric in Asia Minor and remains a Latin Catholic titular see.

== History ==
The Ancient city of Attananus, near modern Aydan, was important enough in the Roman province of Phrygia Prima to become a suffragan of the Metropolitan Archbishop of its capital Laodicea on the Lycus, but faded.

== Titular see ==
The diocese was nominally restored as a titular bishopric, no later than 1952, under the names Attanasus (Latin; adjective Attanasen(sis)) / Attanaso (Curiate Italian).

It is vacant since decades, having had only two incumbents, both of the fitting Episcopal (lowest) rank :

- Lawrence Pullen Hardman, Montfort Missionaries (S.M.M.) (born England) (1952.05.15 – 1959.04.25), later last Apostolic Vicar of Zomba (Malawi) (1952.05.15 – 1959.04.25), promoted first Bishop of Zomba (1959.04.25 – retired 1970.09.21), emeritate as Titular Bishop of Cenculiana (1970.09.21 – resigned 1971.04.06), died 1996
- Joseph Albert Malula (1959.07.18 – 1964.07.07), as Auxiliary Bishop of Léopoldville (now Kinshasa, Congo-Kinshasa) (1959.07.18 – 1964.07.07), succeeded as last Metropolitan Archbishop of Léopoldville (1964.07.07 – 1966.05.30), restyled first Metropolitan Archbishop of Kinshasa (1966.05.30 – 1989.06.14), created Cardinal-priest of Santi Protomartiri a Via Aurelia Antica (1969.04.30 – 1989.06.14), President of Symposium of Episcopal Conferences of Africa and Madagascar (1984 – 1987).

== Sources and external links ==
- GigaCatholic with titular incumbent biography links - data for all sections
