= Jean-Pierre Kwambamba Masi =

- Bishop of Kenge
- Church: Catholic Church
- See: Catholic Diocese of Kenge
- In office: 2018
- Predecessor: Gaspard Mudiso Mundla, S.V.D
- Successor: current

Orders
- Ordination: 17 August 1986
- Consecration: 31 March 2015 by cardinal Laurent Monsengwo Pasinya

Personal details
- Born: 19 August 1960
- Motto: Misericordia et gaudium ("Mercy and joy")
- Coat of arms

Jean-Pierre Kwambamba Masi (born 9 August 1960) is a Catholic bishop who serves in the Democratic Republic of the Congo.

Kwambamba Masi was born in the Democratic Republic of the Congo and was ordained to the priesthood in 1986. He served as a papal master of ceremony in the Office for the Liturgical Celebrations of the Supreme Pontiff from 2009 to 2015. He served as the titular bishop of Naratcata and as auxiliary bishop of the Catholic Archdiocese of Kinshasa, Democratic Republic of the Congo, from 2015 to 2018 and as Bishop of Kenge from 2018 to the present.
