= Joseph Kumuondala Mbimba =

- Archbishop of Mbandaka-Bikoro
- Church: Catholic Church
- Archdiocese: Archdiocese of Mbandaka-Bikoro
- In office: 11 October 1991 – 6 March 2016
- Predecessor: Frédéric Etsou-Nzabi-Bamungwabi
- Successor: Fridolin Ambongo Besungu
- Previous posts: Bishop of Bokungu–Ikela (1982-1991); Titular Bishop of Simidicca (1980-1982); Auxiliary Bishop of Bokungu–Ikela (1980-1982)

Orders
- Ordination: 21 September 1969
- Consecration: 7 June 1981 by Frédéric Etsou-Nzabi-Bamungwabi

Personal details
- Born: 1941 Mokombe (northwest of Opala), Stanleyville Province, Belgian Congo, Belgian Empire
- Died: 6 March 2016 (aged 74–75)

Joseph Kumuondala Mbimba (1941 – 6 March 2016) was a Roman Catholic archbishop.

Ordained to the priesthood in 1969, Kumuondala Mbimba was named auxiliary bishop and then diocesan bishop of Bokunga-Ikela, Democratic Republic of the Congo, in 1982. In 1991, he was named archbishop of the Archdiocese of Mbandaka-Besunga. He died while still in office.
