= Roman Catholic Diocese of Bikoro =

The Roman Catholic Diocese (formerly a missionary jurisdiction) of Bikoro was a Latin Church diocese in (initially Belgian) Congo (Zaire) from 1931 to 1975, named after its then headquarters/ episcopal see Bikoro, run by the Vincentians (Lazarists, C.M.).

== History ==
It was founded on 3 January 1931 as the Mission sui iuris of Bikoro, on territories split from the then Apostolic Vicariate of Léopoldville and Apostolic Prefecture of Coquilhatville.

It was promoted on 25 June 1940 as Apostolic Prefecture of Bikoro, and again on 28 June 1957 as Apostolic Vicariate of Bikoro, hence entitled to a titular bishop.

It lost its missionary exempt status (directly subject to the Holy See) by its final promotion on 10 November 1959 to Diocese of Bikoro, becoming a suffragan of the Metropolitan then Roman Catholic Archdiocese of Mbandaka.

On 12 April 1975 it was suppressed, its territory being divided between its Metropolitan, which absorbed its title by renaming to Archdiocese of Mbandaka–Bikoro, and the equally preexisting Diocese of Inongo.

== Ordinaries ==
(All Latin rite missionary members of the Lazarists; C.M.)

Ecclesiastical Superiors of the Mission sui iuris of Bikoro

- Father Leone Sieben, C.M. (born Belgium) (1931.06.27 – 1932)
- Fr. Felice de Kempeneer, C.M. (1933 – 1938)
- Fr. Andrea Windels, C.M. (1939 – 1940.06.25 see below)

Apostolic Prefects of Bikoro

- Fr. Andrea Windels, C.M. (see above 1940.06.25 – death 1946)
- Fr. Camille Vandekerckhove, C.M. (1946.06.21 – 1957.06.28 see below)

Apostolic Vicar of Bikoro

- Camille Vandekerckhove, C.M., Titular Bishop of Sufetula (see above 1957.06.28 – 1959.11.10 see below)

Bishop of Bikoro

- Camille Vandekerckhove, C.M. (see above 1959.11.10 – death 1975.02.27).

== See also ==
- List of Catholic dioceses in the Democratic Republic of the Congo
- Catholic Church in the Republic of the Congo

== Sources and external links ==
- GigaCatholic, with incumbent biography links - data for all sections
