= Louis Nganga a Ndzando =

- Bishop of the Diocese of Lisala (emeritus)
- Church: Roman Catholic Church
- See: Roman Catholic Diocese of Lisala
- In office: 1964 - 1997
- Predecessor: François Van den Berghe
- Successor: Louis Nkinga Bondala

Orders
- Ordination: February 22, 1953

Personal details
- Born: 1923 Ndeke Mabela, Democratic Republic of Congo
- Died: February 13, 2014 (aged 90–91)

Louis Nganga a Ndzando (1923 – February 13, 2014) was a Congolese prelate of the Catholic Church.

Ndzando was born in Ndeke Mabela and was ordained a priest on February 23, 1953. Ndzando was appointed auxiliary bishop of the Diocese of Lisala, as well as titular bishop of Athyra, on April 18, 1961, and ordained bishop on July 9, 1961. Ndzando was appointed bishop of the Diocese of Lisala on November 25, 1964, and retired from the diocese on July 6, 1997.
