= Santa Maria Regina Pacis a Ostia Lido =

Catholic titular church in Rome

- Church of Saint Mary Queen of Peace in Ostia Lido
- Chiesa di Santa Maria Regina Pacis
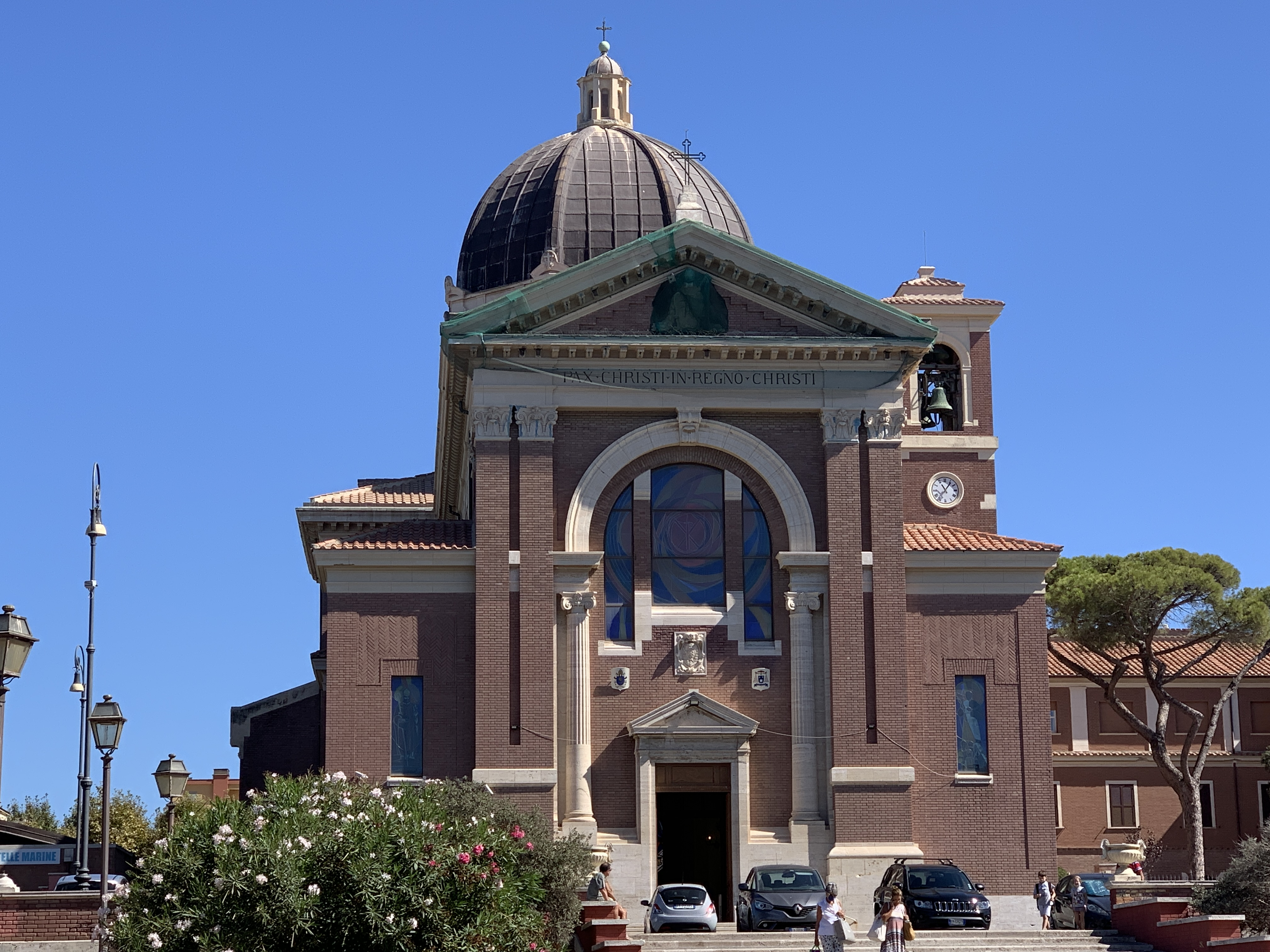
- Façade and dome
- Click on the map for a fullscreen view
- 41°43′54″N 12°16′53″E
- Location: Via Maurizio Quadrio 21, Q. Lido di Ostia Levante, Rome
- Country: Italy
- Language: Italian
- Denomination: Catholic Church
- Tradition: Roman Rite
- Website: reginapacisostia.it

History
- Status: titular church, parish church
- Dedication: Mary, Queen of Peace
- Consecrated: 20 December 1928

Architecture
- Architect: Giulio Magni
- Architectural type: Renaissance Revival, Baroque Revival
- Groundbreaking: 1919
- Completed: 1928

Specifications
- Length: 56 m (184 ft)
- Width: 21 m (69 ft)

Administration
- Diocese: Rome

Santa Maria Regina Pacis a Ostia Lido is a 20th-century parochial church and titular church in Ostia, southwest of Rome, dedicated to Mary, Queen of Peace.

== History ==
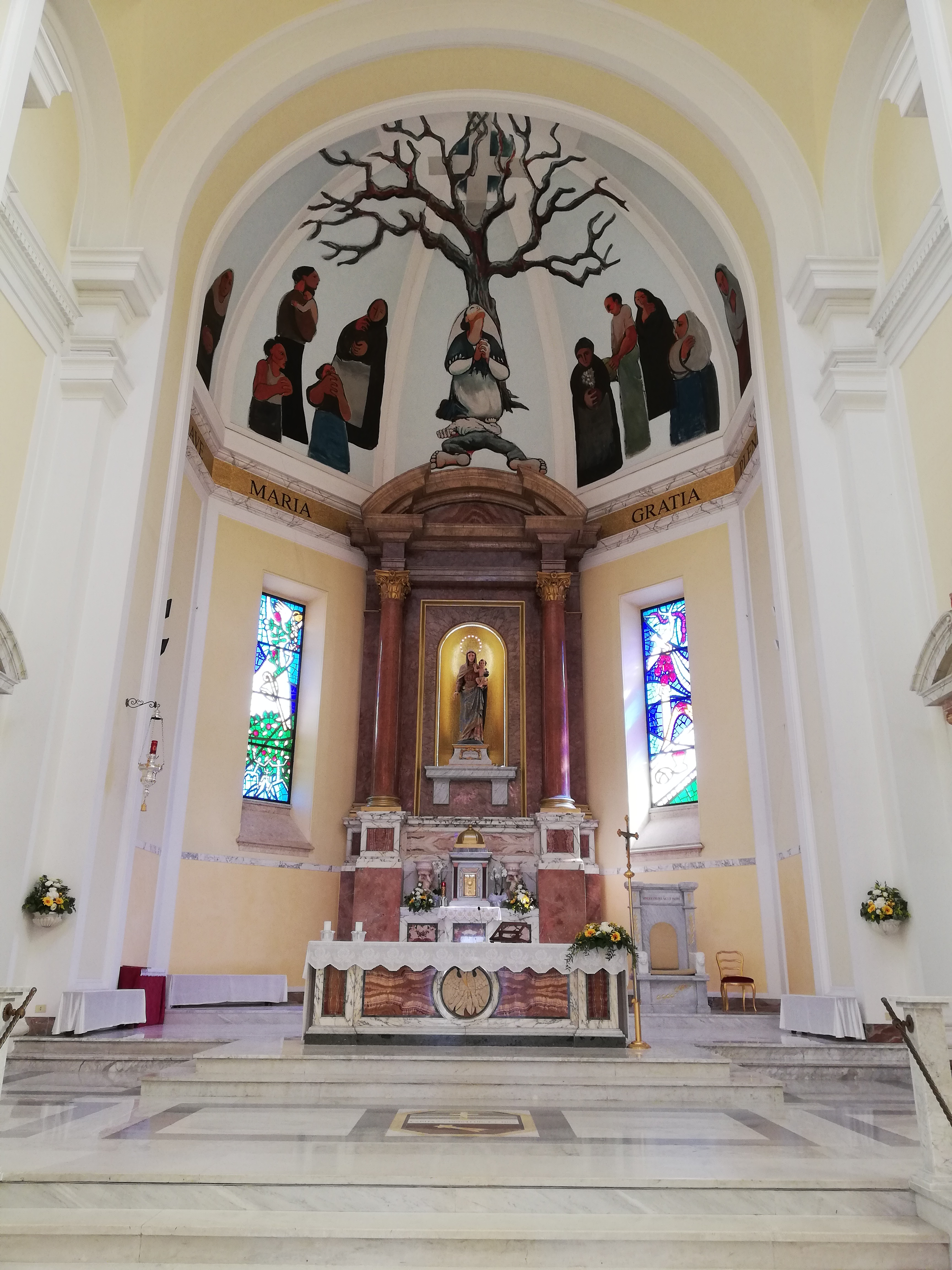
View of apse

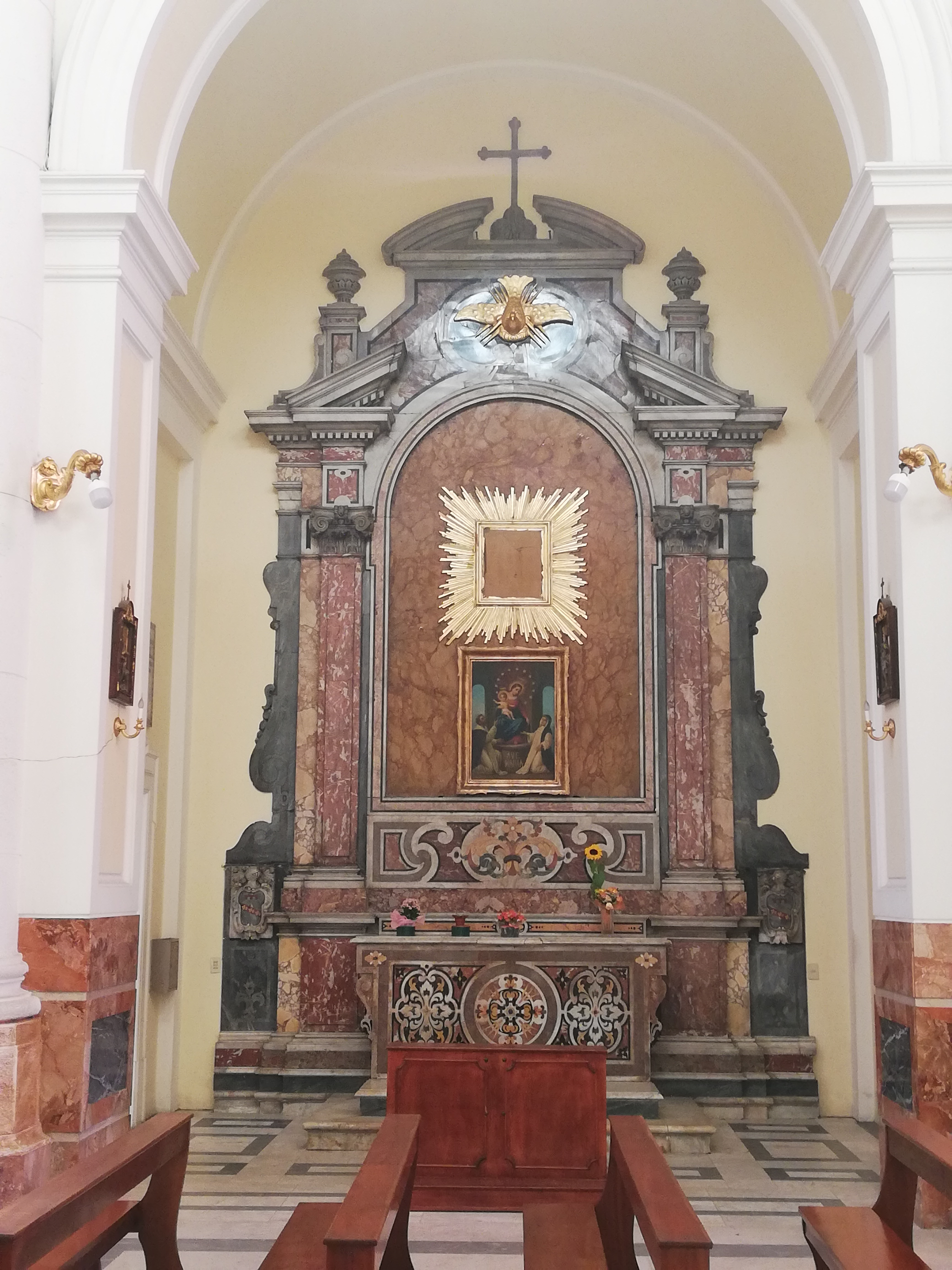
Side altar

In 1916, it was suggested to Vincenzo Vannutelli, Bishop of Ostia, to construct a church to Our Lady, Queen of Peace, in order to pray for an end to the First World War.

The church was built in 1919–28. It has been visited by Pope Paul VI (1968), Pope John Paul II (1980), Pope Francis (2015) and Pope Leo XIV (2026).

.

The church was made a titular church on 5 March 1973 to be held by a cardinal priest.

Titulars

- James Darcy Freeman (1973–1991)
- Paul Joseph Phạm Đình Tụng (1994–2009)
- Laurent Monsengwo Pasinya (2010–2021)
- William Goh Seng Chye (2022–present)

== Building ==
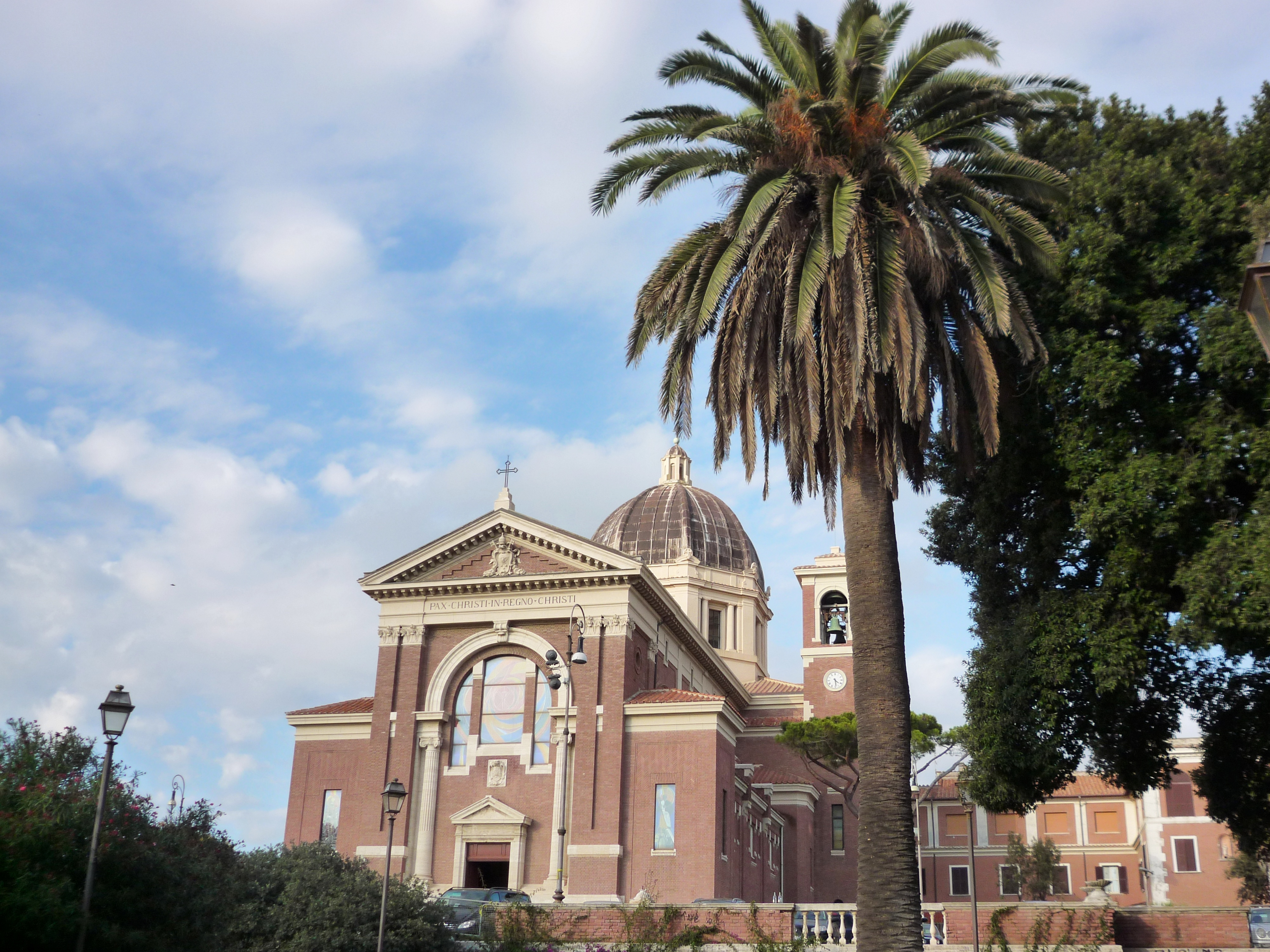
View of Santa Maria Regina Pacis a Ostia Lido and palm tree

In basilica form with side chapels and transept. The nave is covered by a round vault divided into sections, sculpted by the lunettes of the side windows. The internal columns are 8 m (26 ft) high under the cornice, in imitation hammered travertine with octagonal plinths and Corinthian capitals.
