= Diocese of Molegbe =

Roman Catholic diocese in the Democratic Republic of the Congo

Diocese of Molegbe Dioecesis Molegbensis

Location
- Country: Democratic Republic of the Congo
- Metropolitan: Mbandaka-Bikoro

Statistics
- Area: 79,000 km^{2} (31,000 sq mi)
- Population: Total; Catholics: (as of 1997); 3,761,732; 1,879,566 (50.0%)

Information
- Rite: Latin Rite

Current leadership
- Pope: Leo XIV
- Bishop: Joseph Mopepe Ngongo
- Bishops emeritus: Joseph-Bernard Likolo Bokal'Etumba

The Roman Catholic Diocese of Molegbe (Latin: Molegben(sis)) is a suffragan Latin diocese in the ecclesiastical province of Mbandaka-Bikoro in the Democratic Republic of the Congo.

Its cathedral episcopal see is Cathédrale Saint-Antoine-de-Padoue (St. Anthony of Padua) in the city of Molegbe.

== Description ==
The Diocese of Molegbe encompasses a territory of approximately 79,000 square kilometers surrounding the commune of Molegbe, Nord-Ubangi province. In 2021, 944,440 Catholics lived in the diocese, representing 53.2 percent of the region's total population.

== History ==
- Established on 7 April 1911 as Apostolic Prefecture of Belgian Ubanghi, on territory split off from the then Apostolic Vicariate of Belgian Congo.
- 28 January 1935: Promoted as Apostolic Vicariate of Belgian Ubanghi, since entitled to a titular bishop.
- Promoted on 10 November 1959 as Diocese of Molegbe, becoming a suffragan diocese of Mbandaka-Bikoro.

== Ordinaries ==
Apostolic Prefects of Belgian Ubanghi

- Fr. Fulgenzio da Gerard-Montes, OFMCap (1911 – 1930?)
- Fr. Basilio Ottavio Tanghe, OFMCap (16 October 1931 – 28 January 1935)

Apostolic Vicars of Belgian Ubanghi

- Basilio Ottavio Tanghe, OFMCap (28 January 1935 – 16 December 1947), Titular Bishop of Tigava (28 January 1935 – 16 December 1947)
- Jean Ghislain Delcuve, OFMCap (10 June 1948 – 13 November 1958), Titular Bishop of Bargylia
- Léon Théobald Delaere, OFMCap (13 November 1958 – 10 November 1959), Titular Bishop of Fessei (13 November 1958 – 10 November 1959)

Bishops of Molegbe

- Léon Théobald Delaere, OFMCap (10 November 1959 – 3 August 1967), later Titular Bishop of Rusibisir (3 August 1967 – 14 September 1976)
  - Apostolic Administrator Louis Nganga a Ndzando (1967 – 5 September 1968), Bishop of Lisala (Congo-Kinshasa) (25 November 1964 – 6 July 1997)
- Joseph Kesenge Wandangakongu (5 September 1968 – 18 October 1997)
- Ignace Matondo Kwa Nzambi, CICM (27 June 1998 – 23 May 2007)
- Dominique Bulamatari (24 November 2009 – 1 August 2023)
- Sede vacante (since 1 August 2023)
  - Joseph-Bernard Likolo Bokal'Etumba, Bishop of the Roman Catholic Diocese of Lisala, has headed the diocese as Apostolic Administrator (1 August 2023 - 6 July 2025)
- Joseph Mopepe Ngongo, Bishop-Elect. Consecration and installation scheduled on 6 July 2025.

== See also ==
- Roman Catholicism in the Democratic Republic of the Congo

== Source and External links ==
- GCatholic.org, with incumbent biography links
- Catholic Hierarchy
