= Menefessi =

Africa Proconsularis.

Menefessi is a former ancient city and bishopric in Tunisia. It is currently a Latin Catholic titular see.

== History ==
Menefessi was located near modern Henchir-Djemmiah. In Roman times, it belonged to the North African Roman province of Byzacena. The city was important enough to become a suffragan bishopric, but faded.

== Bishopric ==
The diocese of Menefessi is a suppressed seat of the Roman Catholic Church.

There are only two documented bishops of Menefessi.

- The Catholic Mensurio who attended the Carthage conference of 411, which brought together the Catholic and Donatist bishops of Roman Africa; on that occasion Menefessi did not have any Donatist bishops.
- Servo took part in the synod gathered in Carthage by the Vandal king of Hunaric in 484, after which he was exiled.

Today Menefessi survives as a titular bishop's seat; the current titular bishop is José Trinidad González Rodríguez, former auxiliary bishop of Guadalajara. The diocese was nominally restored in 1933 as a Latin Catholic titular bishopric.

It has had the following incumbents, both of the lowest (episcopal) and intermediary (archiepiscopal) ranks :

- Titular Bishop Ignatius John Doggett, Friars Minor (O.F.M.) (1969.06.06 – 1976.07.07)
- Titular Archbishop Frédéric Etsou-Nzabi-Bamungwabi, Scheutists (C.I.C.M.) (1976.07.08 – 1977.11.11), later Cardinal-Priest of Santa Lucia a Piazza d’Armi (1991.06.28 – 2007.01.06)
- Titular Bishop István Ács, Pauline Fathers (O.S.P.P.E.) (1988.12.23 – 1993.03.27)
- Titular Bishop José Trinidad González Rodríguez (1997.02.21 – 2024.04.01), Auxiliary Bishop-emeritus of Guadalajara
