= Roman Catholic Diocese of Lisala =

Roman Catholic diocese in the Democratic Republic of the Congo

Diocese of Lisala Dioecesis Lisalaensis

Location
- Country: Democratic Republic of the Congo
- Metropolitan: Mbandaka-Bikoro

Statistics
- Area: 70,000 km^{2} (27,000 sq mi)
- Population: Total; Catholics: (as of 2004); 1,400,000; 767,232 (54.8%)

Information
- Rite: Latin Rite

Current leadership
- Pope: Leo XIV
- Bishop: Joseph-Bernard Likolo Bokal'Etumba
- Bishops emeritus: Ernest Ngboko Ngombe C.I.C.M.

The Roman Catholic Diocese of Lisala (Latin: Lisalaën(sis)) is a Latin Catholic diocese in the ecclesiastical province of Mbandaka-Bikoro in the Democratic Republic of the Congo, named after its see, located in the city of Lisala.

== History ==
- Established on 3 April 1919, as Apostolic Vicariate (missionary, exempt pre-diocesan jurisdiction) of Nouvelle-Anvers, on territory split off from the then-Apostolic Vicariate of Léopoldville
- Repeatedly lost territory, to establish Apostolic Prefecture of Tsuapa (11 February 1924), Apostolic Prefecture of Coquilhatville (28 January 1926) and Apostolic Prefecture of Basankusu (28 July 1926).
- 27 January 1936: Renamed as Apostolic Vicariate of Lisala
- Lost territory on 14 June 1951 to establish Apostolic Prefecture of Isangi
- 10 November 1959: Promoted as Diocese of Lisala, becoming a suffragan of the Metropolitan Archbishop of Mbandaka-Bikoro
- Lost territory on 25 November 1964 to establish Roman Catholic Diocese of Budjala

== Bishops ==
=== Episcopal ordinaries ===
Nearly all (originally missionary) members of Latin Rite congregation Scheutists (C.I.C.M.)
Vicars Apostolic of Nouvelle-Anvers (Latin Rite)

- Bishop Egidio de Böck, C.I.C.M., Titular Bishop of Azotus (4 January 1921 – 27 January 1936) (previously Apostolic Prefect of then Apostolic Prefecture of Kasaï Supérieur)

Vicars Apostolic of Lisala

- Bishop Egidio de Böck, C.I.C.M. (27 January 1936 – 20 December 1944)
- Bishop François van den Berghe, C.I.C.M., Titular Bishop of Boseta (20 December 1944 – 10 November 1959), previously coadjutor vicar apostolic (9 February 1943 – 20 December 1944)

Bishops of Lisala

- François van den Berghe, C.I.C.M. (see above 10 November 1959 – 25 November 1964)
- Louis Nganga a Ndzando (25 November 1964 – 6 July 1997), previously Auxiliary bishop (18 April 1961 – 25 November 1964); also Apostolic Administrator of Molegbe (1967 – 5 September 1968)
- Louis Nkinga Bondala, C.I.C.M. (6 July 1997 – 11 February 2015), previously coadjutor bishop (13 March 1996 – 6 July 1997); also Apostolic Administrator of Molegbe (23 May 2007 – 14 November 2009)
- Ernest Ngboko Ngombe, C.I.C.M. (11 February 2015 – 23 November 2019), Appointed Archbishop of Mbandaka-Bikoro
- Joseph-Bernard Likolo Bokal'Etumba (15 February 2021 – present)

=== Coadjutor bishops ===
- François Van den Berghe, C.I.C.M. (1943-1944), as Coadjutor Vicar Apostolic
- Louis Nkinga Bondala, C.I.C.M. (1996-1997)

== See also ==
- Roman Catholicism in the Democratic Republic of the Congo

== Source and External links ==
- GCatholic.org
- Catholic Hierarchy
