= Diocese of Kenge =

Roman Catholic diocese in the Democratic Republic of the Congo

Coordinates: 4.805841°S 17.037702°E

Diocese of Kenge Dioecesis Kengensis

Location
- Country: Democratic Republic of the Congo
- Metropolitan: Kinshasa

Statistics
- Area: 34,385 km^{2} (13,276 sq mi)
- Population: Total; Catholics: (as of 2004); 768,996; 380,863 (49.5%)

Information
- Rite: Latin Rite
- Cathedral: Cathedral of Blessed Anwarite

Current leadership
- Pope: Leo XIV
- Bishop: Jean-Pierre Kwambamba Masi
- Bishops emeritus: Gaspard Mudiso Mundla, S.V.D.

The Roman Catholic Diocese of Kenge (Latin: Kengen(sis)) is a suffragan Latin diocese in the ecclesiastical province of the Metropolitan Archdiocese of Kinshasa.

Its cathedral and episcopal see is the Cathedral of Blessed Anwarite (French: Cathédrale Bienheureuse Anwarite) in the city of Kenge, Bas-Congo, in the Democratic Republic of the Congo's Kongo Central province.

== History ==
- Established on 5 July 1957 as Apostolic Prefecture of Kenge (exempt missionary jurisdiction), on territory split off from the Apostolic Vicariate of Kikwit and the Apostolic Vicariate of Kisantu
- Promoted on 6 July 1963 as Diocese of Kenge

== Bishops ==
=== Ordinaries ===
(all Roman Rite; to March 31, 2018 all but one were Latin members of the Missionaries of the Divine Word, S.V.D.)

Apostolic prefect of Kenge

- Fr. Jean Van der Heyden, S.V.D. (1957 – 1963)

Suffragan bishops of Kenge

- François Hoenen, S.V.D. (6 July 1963 - 25 April 1974)
- Dieudonné M'Sanda Tsinda-Hata (25 April 1974 - 1 June 1999)
- Gaspard Mudiso Mundla, S.V.D. (1 June 1999 - 31 March 2018)), succeeding as former coadjutor bishop of Kenge (1997.12.13 – 1999.06.01)
- Jean-Pierre Kwambamba Masi (31 March 2018 - ...), succeeding as former auxiliary bishop of Kinshasa (2015.03.31 - 2018.03.31)

=== Coadjutor bishop ===
- Gaspard Mudiso Mundla, S.V.D. (1997–1999)

=== Other priest of this diocese who became bishop ===
- Bernard Marie Fansaka Biniama, appointed bishop of Popokabaka in 2020

== See also ==
- Roman Catholicism in the Democratic Republic of the Congo

== Sources and external links ==
- GCatholic.org, with incumbent biography links
- Catholic Hierarchy
