= Laurent Monsengwo Pasinya =

Congolese prelate of the Catholic Church (1939–2021)

His Eminence Laurent Monsengwo Pasinya
- Cardinal, Archbishop Emeritus of Kinshasa
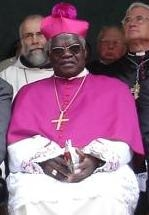
- Monsengwo Pasinya in 2007
- Church: Catholic Church
- Province: Kinshasa
- See: Kinshasa
- Appointed: 6 December 2007
- Installed: 2 February 2008
- Term ended: 1 November 2018
- Predecessor: Frédéric Etsou-Nzabi-Bamungwabi
- Successor: Fridolin Ambongo Besungu
- Other posts: Cardinal-Priest of S. Maria "Regina Pacis" in Ostia mare Member of the Council of Cardinals
- Previous posts: Auxiliary Bishop of Inongo (1980–1981); Titular Bishop of Aquae Novae in Proconsulari (1980–1988); Auxiliary Bishop of Kisangani (1981–1988); Archbishop of Kisangani (1988–2007)

Orders
- Ordination: 21 December 1963 by Gregorio Pietro Agagianian
- Consecration: 4 May 1980 by Pope John Paul II
- Created cardinal: 20 November 2010 by Pope Benedict XVI
- Rank: Cardinal-Priest

Personal details
- Born: Laurent Monsengwo Pasinya; 7 October 1939 Mongobele, Belgian Congo
- Died: 11 July 2021 (aged 81) Versailles, France
- Motto: In fide veritatis (English: In faith truth)
- Coat of arms

Laurent Monsengwo Pasinya (7 October 1939 – 11 July 2021) was a Congolese prelate of the Catholic Church. He was the Archbishop of Kinshasa from 2007 to 2018. He became a cardinal in 2010. He was widely recognized as a champion of peace, dialogue, and human rights.

== Early years ==
Monsengwo Pasinya was born in Mongobele, Diocese of Inongo. He belonged to one of the royal families of Basakata; his second name, Monsengwo, means "nephew of the traditional chief".

He did his initial ecclesiastical studies at the Seminary of Bokoro and furthered them at the Major Seminary of Kabwe where he studied philosophy. He was sent to Rome to attend the Pontifical Urban University, and the Pontifical Biblical Institute. He also studied at the Pontifical Biblical Institute in Jerusalem, where he was awarded a doctorate in biblical studies. He is the first African to obtain such a doctorate. He studied there under Carlo Maria Martini, S.J. who later became a cardinal and archbishop of Milan. He was ordained to the priesthood on 21 December 1963 in Rome. After his ordination he did pastoral work and served as a faculty member at the Theological Faculty of Kinshasa for several years. He was secretary-general of the Congolese Episcopal Conference from 1976 to 1980.

== Episcopate ==
Pope John Paul II appointed him Titular Bishop of Aquae Novae in Proconsulari and Auxiliary Bishop of Kisangani on 13 February 1980. He was consecrated on 4 May 1980 in Kinshasa by Pope John Paul II, assisted by Agnelo Rossi, Cardinal Prefect of the Congregation for the Evangelization of Peoples, and Joseph Malula, Archbishop of Kinshasa. He served as president of the Congolese Episcopal Conference in 1980 and again in 1992. He was appointed Metropolitan Archbishop of Kisangani on 1 September 1988. When dictator Mobutu Sese Seko was losing his grip on power in the mid-1990s, the country needed someone of unimpeachable integrity to engineer the transition. Monsengwo Pasinya was appointed president of the Sovereign National Conference in 1991, president of the High Council of the Republic in 1992, and speaker of a Transitional Parliament in 1994.

Pope Benedict XVI transferred him to the metropolitan see of Kinshasa on 6 December 2007 after the death of Cardinal Frédéric Etsou-Nzabi-Bamungwabi in January 2007. He served as Co-President of Pax Christi International from 2007 to 2010.

He served two terms as head of the Congolese Bishops Conference and was president of the episcopal conference of Africa and Madagascar (SECAM) from 1997 to 2003.

He participated in the Synod of Bishops on several occasions. John Paul named him a member of the 2001 Synod. Pope Benedict XVI named him special secretary for the Synod of Bishops held in October 2008, and delegate-president for that of 2012. Pope Francis named him a papal delegate to the Synod of 2015 on the family in the Church and the modern world.

In October 2009, addressing the Synod of Bishops' special assembly for Africa, he said:

Peace goes hand in hand with justice, justice with right, right with truth. Without justice, social peace is badly placed. Thus, the promotion of the State of Law is necessary, at any price, where the primacy of the law reigns, notably constitutional law; the States of Law where the arbitrary and subjectivity do not create the law of the jungle; States of Law where national sovereignty is recognized and respected; States of Law where to each one, its due is equitably rendered. Without truth, it is difficult to ensure justice and to speak of rights. The consequence of this is that right and not right have equal freedom of the city; which makes it impossible to have an harmonious order of things or “tranquillitas ordinis”. “In truth there is peace” (Benedict XVI). This is why in seeking peaceful solutions, all notable diplomatic and political approaches aim at reestablishing truth, justice and peace. Christ is our peace, He made peace, He proclaimed peace, so that all Jews and pagans could be made one people. Not by leaving each other with their privileges and their rights, but in abolishing exclusion, in pulling down the wall of cultural and social separation, in destroying the hatred which He crucified upon the cross with his body. Jews and Gentiles are no longer foreigners, or strangers, but close friends, fellow-citizens of the saints, and each one has the same heritage (Eph 3:6) having belonged in the past to the one Israel. In this way, He created a new man, to reconcile them both to God and to give them access to the Father through the Spirit. It is in doing away with all these barriers, exclusion, discriminatory laws in faith and society, and especially in killing hatred that one reconciles men and peace is made.

Pope John Paul named him a member of the Pontifical Council for Justice and Peace on 22 April 2002. On 20 November 2010 Pope Benedict made him Cardinal-Priest of Santa Maria Regina Pacis a Ostia Lido. On 11 December 2010, Benedict named him a member of the Congregation for Catholic Education, on 29 December 2010 of the Pontifical Council for Justice and Peace, on 10 December 2011 of the Pontifical Council for Culture, on 29 December 2011 of the Pontifical Council for Social Communications, and on 5 March 2012 of the Congregation for the Evangelization of Peoples.

In December 2011 Monsengwo Pasinya contradicted Kabila when he assessed the 2011 election in the Congo by saying the results "do not conform either to truth or to justice".

He was chosen to preach the Lenten spiritual exercises to Pope Benedict and the Roman Curia in 2012.

In 2013, Monsengwo Pasinya was mentioned as a possible successor to Pope Benedict XVI. He was one of the cardinal electors who participated in the 2013 papal conclave that elected Pope Francis. On 13 April 2013, he was appointed to the Council of Cardinals, a group Pope Francis established a month after his election to advise him and to study a plan for revising the Apostolic Constitution on the Roman Curia, Pastor Bonus.

== Later life ==
In January 2018, even as he approached retirement, he continued to protest violence on Kabila's part against protesters calling on him to abide by the constitutional restrictions in his term of office.

Pope Francis accepted his resignation as Archbishop of Kinshasa on 1 November 2018. On 12 December 2018, the Vatican announced that Monsengwo Pasinya would be leaving the Council of Cardinals as part of his retirement as well.

He died on 11 July 2021 in Versailles, France; he had arrived there recently for medical care.

== See also ==
- Christophe Mboso N'Kodia Pwanga
- Jeannine Mabunda
- Gabriel Kyungu wa Kumwanza

Catholic Church titles
Preceded by Braulio Sánchez Fuentes	— TITULAR — Titular Bishop of Aquæ novæ in Proconsulari; 13 February 1980 – 1 September 1988	Succeeded by Vilmos Dékány
Preceded by Augustin Fataki Alueke	Archbishop of Kisangani; 1 September 1988 – 6 December 2007	Succeeded by Marcel Utembi Tapa
Preceded by Michel Sabbah	International President of Pax Christi; 3 November 2007 – March 2010	Succeeded by Kevin Patrick Dowling
Preceded by Frédéric Etsou-Nzabi-Bamungwabi	Archbishop of Kinshasa; 6 December 2007 – 1 November 2018	Succeeded by Fridolin Ambongo Besungu
Preceded by Paul-Joseph Phạm Ðình Tụng	Cardinal-Priest of Santa Maria Regina Pacis a Ostia Lido; 20 November 2010 – 11 July 2021	Succeeded by William Goh Seng Chye
