= Diocese of Bokungu–Ikela =

Catholic diocese in the Democratic Republic of the Congo

Coordinates: 0.6061°S 22.3125°E

Diocese of Bokungu–Ikela Dioecesis Bokunguensis-Ikelaensis Diocèse catholique romain de Bokungu-Ikela

Location
- Country: Democratic Republic of the Congo
- Ecclesiastical province: Mbandaka-Bikoro

Statistics
- Area: 42,000 km^{2} (16,000 sq mi)
- Population: Total; Catholics: (as of 2006); 617,000; 49,351 (8.0%)

Information
- Denomination: Catholic Church
- Sui iuris church: Latin Church
- Rite: Roman Rite

Current leadership
- Pope: Leo XIV
- Bishop: Toussaint Iluku Bolumbu, M.S.C.

The Diocese of Bokungu–Ikela (Latin: Dioecesis corruptionis-Ikela, French: Diocèse catholique romain de Bokungu-Ikela) is a diocese located in the city of Bokungu–Ikela in the ecclesiastical province of Mbandaka-Bikoro in the Democratic Republic of the Congo.

== History ==
- 11 September 1961: Established as Diocese of Ikela from the Metropolitan Archdiocese of Coquilhatville
- 16 June 1967: Renamed as Diocese of Bokungu – Ikela / Bokunguen(sis) (Latin)

== Bishops ==
=== Ordinaries, in reverse chronological order ===
- Bishops of Bokungu–Ikela, below
  - Toussaint Iluku Bolumbu, M.S.C. (13 May 2019 – present)
  - Fridolin Ambongo Besungu, O.F.M. Cap. (22 November 2004 – 25 November 2018), appointed Archbishop of Mbandaka-Bikoro 12 November 2016 but continued here as Apostolic Administrator; future Cardinal
  - Joseph Mokobe Ndjoku (6 December 1993 – 9 November 2001), appointed Bishop of Basankusu
  - Joseph Kumuondala Mbimba (18 March 1982 – 11 October 1991), appointed Archbishop of Mbandaka-Bikoro
  - Joseph Weigl, M.S.C. (16 June 1967 – 1982); see below
- Bishop of Ikela, below
  - Joseph Weigl, M.S.C. (11 September 1961 – 16 June 1967); see above

=== Auxiliary bishop ===
- Joseph Kumuondala Mbimba (1980-1982), appointed Bishop here

== See also ==
- Catholic Church in the Democratic Republic of the Congo

== Sources ==
- GCatholic.org
- Catholic Hierarchy
