= Joseph Malula =

Roman Catholic cardinal

His Eminence Joseph-Albert Malula
- Cardinal, Archbishop of Kinshasa
- Church: Catholic Church
- Archdiocese: Kinshasa
- Appointed: 7 July 1964 (Note: The archdiocese had been named as Léopoldville until it became Kinshasa archdiocese in mid-1966.)
- Installed: 27 August 1964
- Term ended: 14 June 1989
- Predecessor: Félix Scalais
- Successor: Frédéric Etsou-Nzabi-Bamungwabi
- Other post: Cardinal-Priest of Saint Poromartiri a Via Aurelia Antica (1969-89)
- Previous posts: Titular Bishop of Attanasus (1959-64); Auxiliary Bishop of Léopoldville (1959-64); President of the Symposium of the Episcopal Conferences of Africa and Madagascar (1984-87)

Orders
- Ordination: 9 June 1946 by Georges Six
- Consecration: 20 September 1959 by Félix Scalais
- Created cardinal: 28 April 1969 by Paul VI
- Rank: Cardinal-Priest

Personal details
- Born: Joseph-Albert Malula; 12 December 1917 Léopoldville, Belgian Congo
- Died: 14 June 1989 (aged 71) Leuven, Belgium
- Motto: In caritate
- Coat of arms

Joseph-Albert Malula (12 December 1917 – 14 June 1989) was a Congolese Catholic prelate who served as Archbishop of Kinshasa from 1964 until his death. He was elevated to the cardinalate in 1969.

== Biography ==
Joseph-Albert Malula was born on 12 December 1917 in Léopoldville, Belgian Congo (modern Kinshasa, Democratic Republic of the Congo) to Remacle Ngalula and Jeanne Bolumbu. He attended primary school in Léopoldville, under the direction of Fr. Raphaël de la Kethulle de Ryhove. From 1931 to 1934, he attended the minor seminary in Mbata Kiela, where he met Joseph Kasa-Vubu, who would later become the first president of the Democratic Republic of Congo, and then the minor seminary of Bolongo in Lisala until 1937.

He studied philosophy (1937–40) and theology (1940–44) at the Major Seminary of Christ-Roi in Kabwe. He served as a professor at the Minor Seminary of Bokoro from 1944 to 1946 as well. Malula was ordained to the priesthood by Bishop Georges Six, CICM, on 9 June 1946, in the Stade Reine Astrid. He then resumed teaching at the minor seminary, and served as vicar and pastor at several parishes in Léopoldville. In 1953, he visited Algiers, Tunisia, Malta, Rome, and Belgium.

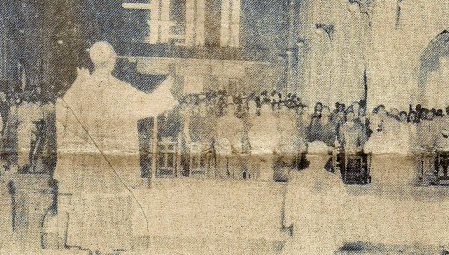
Joseph Malula leading a ceremony before members of the government at the Notre Dame du Congo, 1961

On 18 July 1959, Malula was appointed Auxiliary Bishop of Léopoldville and Titular Bishop of Attanasus by Pope John XXIII. He received his episcopal consecration on the following 20 September from Archbishop Félix Scalais, CICM, with Bishops Pierre Kimbondo and Joseph Nkongolo serving as co-consecrators, at the Stade Tata Raphaël. Malula attended the Second Vatican Council from 1962 to 1965, during which he was advanced to the Archbishop of Léopoldville on 7 July 1964. He was installed as Archbishop on 27 August of that same year, and the name of the archdiocese was later changed to Kinshasa on 30 May 1966.

Pope Paul VI created him Cardinal Priest of Santi Protomartiri a Via Aurelia Antica in the consistory of 28 April 1969. He was the first cardinal from Zaire. At a Mass in 1970, at which President Mobutu was present, the Cardinal claimed Zaire's ruling class was enriching itself and ignoring the people's misery In 1971, despite being an advocate of African culture, he expressed his disapproval of Christians giving up their baptismal names in an article in the Catholic weekly magazine, Afrique Chrétienne, following the renaming of the Republic of the Congo as the Republic of Zaire. President Mobutu subsequently removed the Cardinal from his government-owned residence and suspended the magazine for six months. Malula was one of the cardinal electors who participated in the conclaves of August and October 1978, which selected Popes John Paul I and John Paul II, respectively. He supported Albino Cardinal Luciani at the August conclave, and even gave him a public embrace before he was elected.

Before the October conclave began, he spoke of the Vatican's pomp, saying, "All that imperial paraphernalia. All that isolation of the Pope. All that medieval remoteness and inheritance that makes Europeans think that the Church is only Western. All that tightness that makes them fail to understand that young countries like mine want something different. They want simplicity. They want Jesus Christ. All that, all that must change."

== Death ==
Cardinal Malula died on 14 June 1989 at a hospital in Leuven, Belgium, aged 71, and is interred at the Cathédrale Notre Dame du Congo, Kinshasa.

Catholic Church titles
Preceded by Félix Scalais, CICM	Archbishop of Kinshasa; 1964–1989	Succeeded by Frédéric Etsou-Nzabi-Bamungwabi, CICM
