= Frédéric Etsou-Nzabi-Bamungwabi =

Roman Catholic cardinal

His Eminence Frédéric Etsou-Nzabi-Bamungwabi C.I.C.M.
- Archbishop of Kinshasa
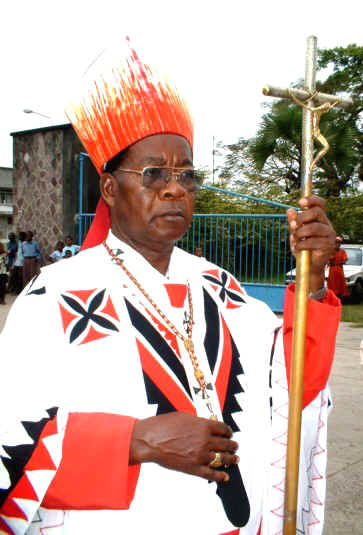
- The cardinal in April 2006.
- Church: Catholic Church
- Archdiocese: Kinshasa
- See: Kinshasa
- Appointed: 7 July 1990
- Term ended: 6 January 2007
- Predecessor: Joseph-Albert Malula
- Successor: Laurent Monsengwo Pasinya
- Other post: Cardinal-Priest of Santa Lucia a Piazza d'Armi (1991-2007)
- Previous posts: Titular Archbishop of Menefessi (1976-77); Coadjutor Archbishop of Mbandaka-Bikoro (1976-77); Archbishop of Mbandaka-Bikoro (1977-90); Apostolic Administrator of Mbandaka-Bikoro (1990-91); President of the National Episcopal Conference of Congo (2000-04)

Orders
- Ordination: 13 July 1958 by François Van den Berghe
- Consecration: 7 November 1976 by Joseph-Albert Malula
- Created cardinal: 28 June 1991 by Pope John Paul II
- Rank: Cardinal-Priest

Personal details
- Born: Frédéric Etsou-Nzabi-Bamungwabi; 3 December 1930 Mazalonga, Belgian Congo
- Died: 6 January 2007 (aged 76) Leuven, Belgium
- Buried: Kinshasa Cathedral
- Parents: Joseph Honoré Marie Mabomba; Françoise Naanu
- Motto: Un seul Coeur un seul esprit

Styles of Frédéric Etsou-Nzabi-Bamungwabi
- Reference style: His Eminence
- Spoken style: Your Eminence
- Informal style: Cardinal
- See: Archbishop of Kinshasa

Frédéric Etsou-Nzabi-Bamungwabi, C.I.C.M. (French pronunciation: [fʁedeʁik ɛtsun zabi bamœ̃ɡwabi]; 3 December 1930, Belgian Congo – 6 January 2007, Leuven, Belgium) was a Congolese Catholic prelate who served as Archbishop of Kinshasa from 1991 until his death in 2007. He was a member of the CICM Missionaries and was elevated to the cardinalate in 1991.

== Biography ==
Educated by Catholic missionaries, Frédéric Etsou joined the CICM missionaries in 1959. He was ordained as a priest on 13 July 1958, and assigned to the city of Leopoldville. He later studied sociology and theology in France and Belgium before returning to Congo in the late 1960s.

Etsou became Archbishop of Mbandaka-Bikoro on 11 November 1977, and Archbishop of Kinshasa in 1990. He was proclaimed a Cardinal-Priest of S. Lucia a Piazza d'Armi by Pope John Paul II on 28 June 1991, succeeding the first Zairean Cardinal, Joseph-Albert Cardinal Malula. He took charge of Congo's Catholic Church in the final years of the rule of longtime dictator Mobutu Sese Seko, and it was said at the time that he was chosen with Mobutu's support. After Mobutu was overthrown in 1997, Etsou spoke out against what he described as the strong-arm tactics of the new leader, Laurent Kabila, the father of the current president of the DRC, Joseph Kabila, who took power in 2001 following his father's assassination.

Etsou was one of the cardinal electors who participated in the 2005 papal conclave that selected Pope Benedict XVI.

In a statement to the Congolese nation and to the international community released on 11 November 2006 from Paris, the Cardinal seemed to doubt the independence of the country's Independent Electoral Commission (headed by a Catholic priest, Apollinaire Malu Malu) and the outcome of the runoff of the first direct presidential election in the more than 40-year history of the country pitting the incumbent Kabila against his challenger vice president Jean-Pierre Bemba. He warned of what he called international meddling and accused several officials with Kabila's transitional government of stealing from the state treasury and demanded their resignations. These statements created tension in the capital city, the stronghold of the challenger, whose family is close to the Cardinal who also hails from the same Équateur Province. The results of the second round of the presidential election, published on 15 November 2006, gave the incumbent a win with 58.05% and his opponent 41.95%.

== Death ==
Frédéric Etsou-Nzabi-Bamungwabi died of diabetes and pneumonia at the University Hospital in Leuven, Belgium on 6 January 2007, aged 76. He was buried in Kinshasa.
