= Archdiocese of Mbandaka-Bikoro =

Roman Catholic archdiocese in the Democratic Republic of the Congo

Coordinates: 0.0600°N 18.2562°E

The cathedral archiepiscopal see is at the Cathedral of St. Eugene, in Mbandaka, Équateur Province.

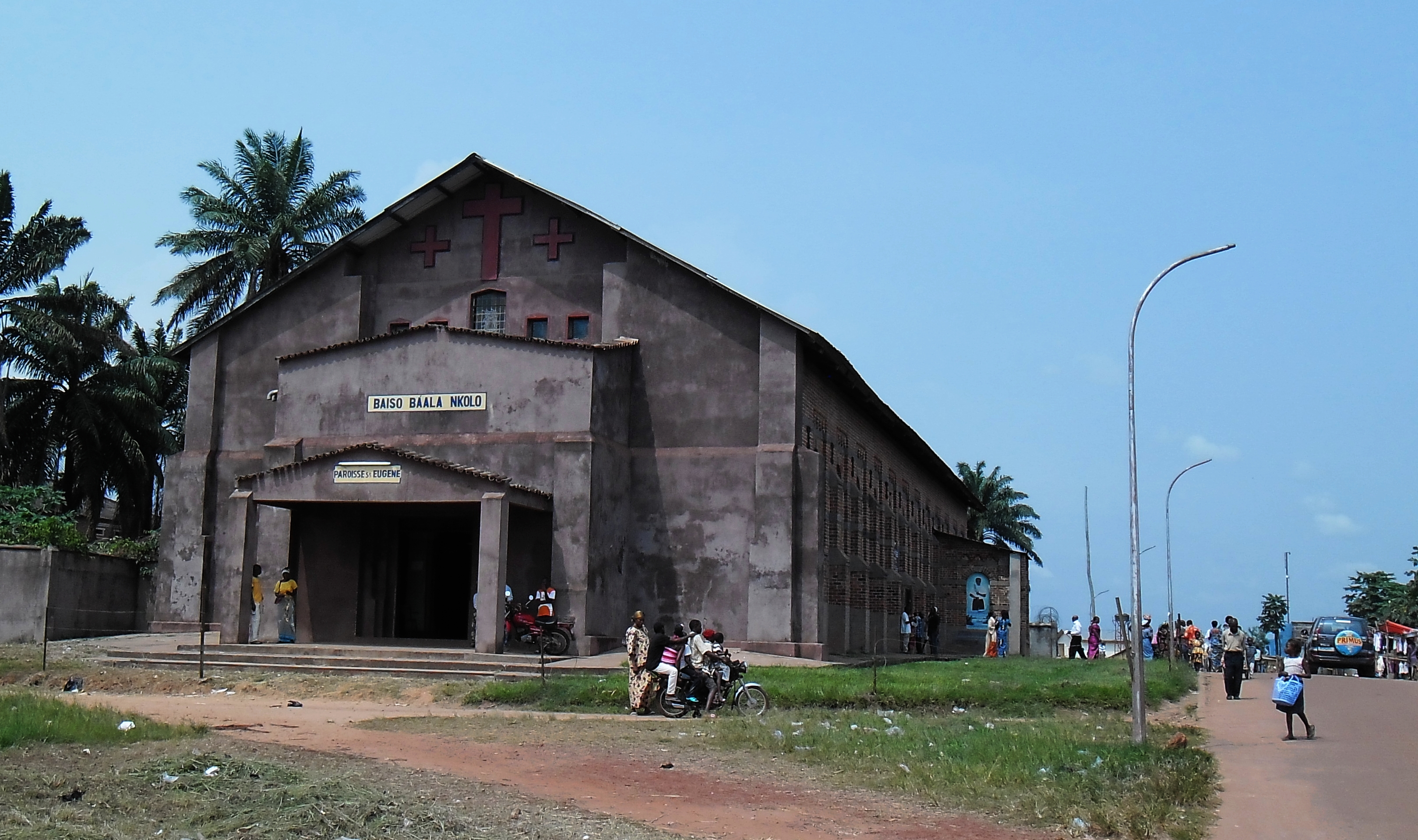
Mbandaka Catholic Cathedral of St Eugene. The words baiso baala nkolo, written above the church entrance, are the beginning of Psalm 123 in Mongo language.

The Roman Catholic Archdiocese of Mbandaka-Bikoro (Latin: Mbandakan(us)–Bikoroën(sis)) is the Metropolitan See for the Latin Rite Ecclesiastical province of Mbandaka-Bikoro, in the western part of the Democratic Republic of the Congo. It is under the authority of the Congregation for the Evangelization of Peoples.

== Statistics ==
As per 2015, it pastorally served 646,000 Catholics (52.4% of 1,232,000 total population) on 95,000 km^{2} in 34 parishes with 87 priests (56 diocesan, 31 religious), 238 lay religious (82 brothers, 156 sisters) and 42 seminarians.

== History ==
- Established on 11 February 1924 as Apostolic Prefecture of Tsuapa, on colonial territory split off from the Apostolic Vicariate of Nouvelle-Anvers
- 28 January 1926: Renamed after its see as Apostolic Prefecture of Coquilhatstad=Coquilhatville, having gained more territory from the above Apostolic Vicariate of Nouvelle-Anvers
- 3 January 1931: Lost territory to establish the Mission sui juris of Bikoro (later a diocese, now merged-in with its title)
- Promoted on 22 March 1932 as Apostolic Vicariate of Coquilhatville
- 14 June 1951: Lost territory to establish the Apostolic Prefecture of Isangi (now a diocese in Kisangani province)
- Promoted on 10 November 1959 as Metropolitan Archdiocese of Coquilhatville
- 11 September 1961: Lost territory to establish the Diocese of Ikela (now its suffragan as Diocese of Bokungu–Ikela)
- 30 May 1966: Renamed with its see as Metropolitan Archdiocese of Mbandaka
- 12 April 1975: Renamed as Metropolitan Archdiocese of Mbandaka–Bikoro, having gained territory from the suppressed Diocese of Bikoro whose title was merged in

== Ecclesiastical Province ==
Its suffragan sees are :

- Roman Catholic Diocese of Basankusu
- Roman Catholic Diocese of Bokungu–Ikela, originally Ikela
- Roman Catholic Diocese of Budjala
- Roman Catholic Diocese of Lisala
- Roman Catholic Diocese of Lolo
- Roman Catholic Diocese of Molegbe

== Bishops ==
=== Ordinaries ===
Apostolic Prefect of Coquilhatville

- Edoardo van Goethem, Sacred Heart Missionaries (M.S.C.) (born Belgium) (25 February 1924 – 22 March 1932 see below)

Apostolic Vicars of Coquilhatville

- Edoardo van Goethem, M.S.C. (see above 22 March 1932 – retired 1946), Titular Bishop of Corone (29 November 1932 – death 26 May 1949)
- Hilaire Marie Vermeiren, M.S.C. (born Belgium) (10 April 1947 – 10 November 1959 see below), Titular Bishop of Gibba (10 April 1947 – 10 November 1959)

Metropolitan Archbishops of Coquilhatville

- Hilaire Marie Vermeiren, M.S.C. (see above 10 November 1959 – retired 8 April 1963), emeritate as Titular Archbishop of Pedachtoë (8 April 1963 – death 18 August 1967)
- Pierre Wijnants, M.S.C. (born Belgium) (21 April 1964 – 30 May 1966 see below)

Metropolitan Archbishop of Mbandaka

- Pierre Wijnants, M.S.C. (see above 30 May 1966 – 12 April 1975 see below)

Metropolitan Archbishops of Mbandaka-Bikoro

- Pierre Wijnants, M.S.C. (see above 12 April 1975 – retired 11 November 1977), died 1978
- Frédéric Etsou-Nzabi-Bamungwabi, Scheutists (C.I.C.M.) (first native Congolese incumbent) (11 November 1977 – 7 July 1990), succeeding as former Titular Archbishop of Menefessi(8 July 1976 – 11 November 1977) as Coadjutor Archbishop of Mbandaka–Bikoro (8 July 1976 – 11 November 1977); later staying on a while as Apostolic Administrator of Mbandaka–Bikoro (7 July 1990 – 11 October 1991) while Metropolitan Archbishop of Kinshasa (7 July 1990 – death 6 January 2007), created Cardinal-Priest of S. Lucia a Piazza d’Armi (28 June 1991 – 6 January 2007), President of National Episcopal Conference of Congo (2000 – 2004)
- Joseph Kumuondala Mbimba (11 October 1991 - death 6 March 2016), also Apostolic Administrator of Diocese of Bokungu–Ikela (Congo-Kinshasa) (11 October 1991 – 1993), Apostolic Administrator of Diocese of Molegbe (Congo-Kinshasa) (1997 – 27 June 1998); previously Titular Bishop of Simidicca (29 November 1980 – 18 March 1982) as Auxiliary Bishop of Diocese of Bokungu–Ikela (Congo-Kinshasa) (29 November 1980 – 18 March 1982), succeeding as Bishop of Bokungu–Ikela (18 March 1982 – 11 October 1991)
- Fridolin Ambongo Besungu, Capuchin Franciscans (O.F.M. Cap.) (12 November 2016 – 6 February 2018), also vice-president of National Episcopal Conference of Congo (24 June 2016 – ...), Apostolic Administrator of Diocese of Bokungu–Ikela (Congo-Kinshasa) (12 November 2016 – 6 February 2018); previously Bishop of above Bokungu–Ikela (22 November 2004 – 12 November 2016), also Apostolic Administrator of Diocese of Kole (Congo-Kinshasa) (30 October 2008 – 6 May 2015), Apostolic Administrator of Mbandaka–Bikoro (5 March 2016 – succession 12 November 2016); next Coadjutor Archbishop of Kinshasa (Congo-Kinshasa) (6 February 2018 – 1 November 2018), Archbishop of Kinshasa (1 November 2018 - ...); created Cardinal-Priest of San Gabriele Arcangelo all'Acqua Traversa (5 October 2019)
- Ernest Ngboko Ngombe, C.I.C.M. (23 November 2019 – present); previously, Bishop of Lisala (11 February 2015 – 23 November 2019)

=== Coadjutor bishop ===
- Frédéric Etsou-Nzabi-Bamungwabi, C.I.C.M. (1976–1977); future Cardinal

== See also ==
- List of Catholic dioceses in the Democratic Republic of the Congo
- Roman Catholicism in the Democratic Republic of the Congo
