= Lisala =

- Provincial capital and city
- Ville de Lisala
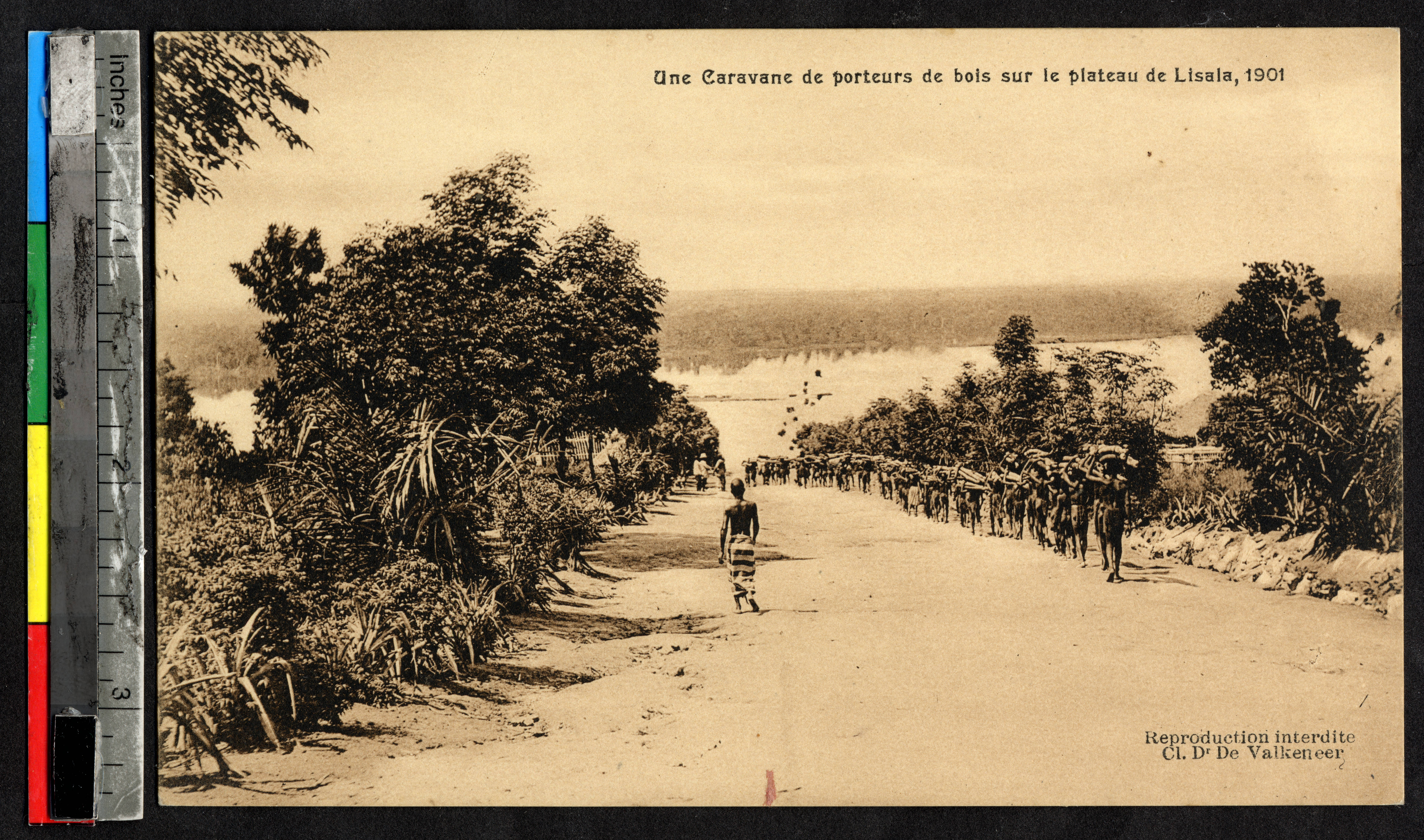
- Porters carrying wood in Lisala, 1901

- Location in Democratic Republic of the Congo
- Coordinates: 2°8′55″N 21°30′49″E
- Country: DR Congo
- Province: Mongala
- Communes: Bolikango, Mongala

Government
  - Mayor: Aimé Bongele

Population (2015)https://democratic-republic-of-the-congo.places-in-the-world.com/211734-place-lisala.html
  - Total: 70,087
  - Languages: Lomongo Lingala French
- Time zone: UTC+1 (West Africa Time)
- Climate: Am

Lisala is the capital of the Mongala Province in northwestern Democratic Republic of the Congo.

The Congo River flows through the city. Its Cathédrale Saint-Hermès is the cathedral episcopal see of the Roman Catholic Diocese of Lisala. It is the birthplace of president Mobutu Sese Seko, who ruled Congo (which he renamed Zaire) from 1965 to 1997.

== Notable people ==
- Mobutu Sese Seko (1930–1997) Congolese politician and military officer who was the president of Zaire from 1965 to 1997 (known as the Democratic Republic of the Congo until 1971.

== See also ==
- Roman Catholic Diocese of Lisala
