= Molegbe =

- Commune
- Location in Democratic Republic of the Congo
- Coordinates: 4°13′32″N 20°54′05″E
- Country: DR Congo
- Province: Nord-Ubangi
- City: Gbadolite

Molegbe is a commune in the city of Gbadolite, the provincial capital of Nord-Ubangi province, in the Democratic Republic of Congo. Its inhabitants speak ngbandi.
