= Fridolin Ambongo Besungu =

Congolese Catholic cardinal (born 1960)

His Eminence Fridolin Ambongo Besungu OFMCap
- Archbishop of Kinshasa
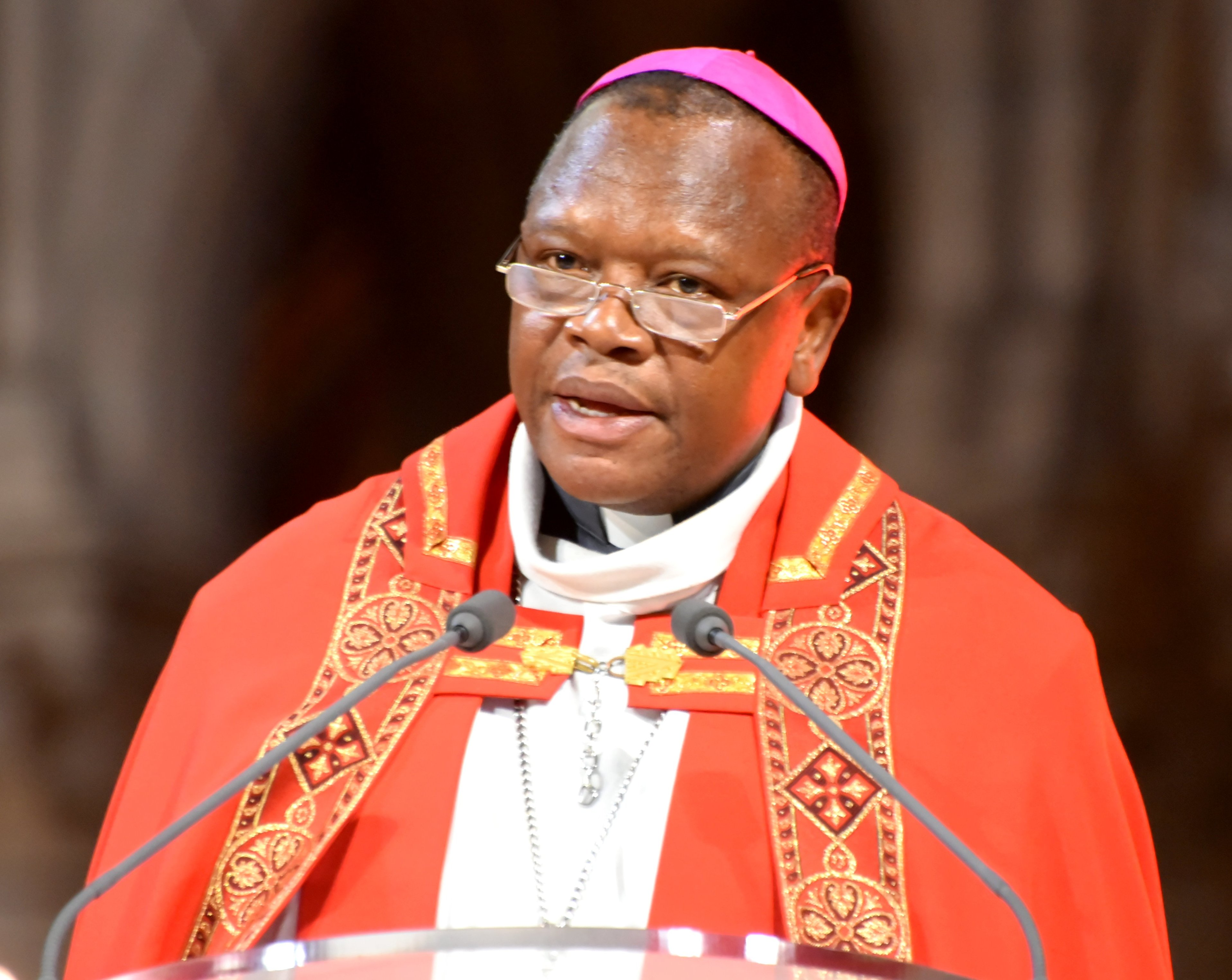
- Besungu in 2019
- Church: Catholic Church
- Archdiocese: Kinshasa
- See: Kinshasa
- Appointed: 1 November 2018
- Installed: 25 November 2018
- Predecessor: Laurent Monsengwo Pasinya
- Other posts: Vice-President of the Congo National Episcopal Conference (2016–); Cardinal-Priest of San Gabriele Arcangelo all'Acqua Traversa (2019–); Member of the Council of Cardinal Advisers (2020–)
- Previous posts: Bishop of Bokungu-Ikela (2004–16); Apostolic Administrator of Kole (2008–15); Apostolic Administrator of Mbandaka-Bikoro (2016); Archbishop of Mbandaka-Bikoro (2016–18); Apostolic Administrator of Bokungu-Ikela (2016–18); Coadjutor Archbishop of Kinshasa (2018)

Orders
- Ordination: 14 August 1988
- Consecration: 6 March 2005 by Joseph Kumuondala Mbimba
- Created cardinal: 5 October 2019 by Pope Francis
- Rank: Cardinal-Priest

Personal details
- Born: Fridolin Ambongo Besungu; 24 January 1960 (age 66) Boto, Belgian Congo
- Education: Alphonsian Academy
- Motto: Omnia omnibus (All things to all)
- Coat of arms

Fridolin Ambongo Besungu OFMCap (born 24 January 1960) is a Congolese Catholic prelate who has served as Archbishop of Kinshasa since 2018. He was previously Bishop of Bokungu-Ikela from 2004 to 2016, Apostolic Administrator of Kole from 2008 to 2015, Archbishop of Mbandaka-Bikoro from 2016 to 2018, Apostolic Administrator of Bokungu-Ikela from 2016 to 2018, and Coadjutor Archbishop of Kinshasa in 2018. He is a member of the Order of Friars Minor Capuchin.

Ambongo served as a parish priest and as a professor before his episcopal career and since becoming a bishop has been a leading voice among his conferees for national peace. Pope Francis raised him to the rank of cardinal on 5 October 2019. In 2023 he became president of the Symposium of Episcopal Conferences of Africa and Madagascar. He is a member of the Council of Cardinals.

== Education and priesthood ==
Fridolin Ambongo Besungu was born in Boto on 24 January 1960 and prepared for the priesthood by studying philosophy in Bwamanda and theology from 1984 to 1988 at the Saint Eugène de Mazenod Institute. He also entered the Order of Friars Minor Capuchin where he made his initial vows in 1981 and his perpetual profession in 1987. He later obtained a degree in moral theological studies from the Alphonsian Academy in Rome, and he speaks Italian.

Ambongo was ordained to the priesthood on 14 August 1988 following the completion of his education. He worked as a parish priest in Bobito from 1988 until 1989 and then as a professor at the Catholic Faculties of Kinshasa. He taught moral theology at the Mazenod Institute from 1995 to 2005. He also served as both the major superior and the vice-provincial for his order for the vice-province of the Congo.

== Bishop ==
Pope John Paul II appointed him Bishop of Bokungu-Ikela on 22 November 2004. He received his episcopal consecration on 6 March 2005 from Joseph Kumuondala Mbimba with the co-consecrators Giovanni d'Aniello and Cardinal Frédéric Etsou-Nzabi-Bamungwabi in an open-air Mass in front of the Bokungu Cathedral. On 30 October 2008 Pope Benedict XVI named him apostolic administrator for Kole, a post he held until 9 August 2015. He made his first "ad limina" visit to Francis on 12 September 2014.

== Archbishop ==
Pope Francis first named him apostolic administrator for Mbandaka-Bikoro on 5 March 2016 and then Archbishop of that see on 12 November, while retaining responsibility for Bokungu-Ikela as Apostolic Administrator. He was installed in his new see on 11 December 2016.

In 2016–18 he decried the repeated attempts of Congo President Joseph Kabila to push back the election in the Congo believing that it sets an alarming precedent and demonstrates the President's unwillingness to relinquish power. He defended those Catholics who organized pro-democratic demonstrations that drew violent responses from police forces. After these violent clashes he signed a statement on behalf of the bishops stating that the prelates "deplored the attack on human life" while offering their condolences to the families of "innocent victims" killed in the clashes. The statement further called for a "serious and objective investigation" to determine those responsible for the extreme violence. Ambongo opposes Kabila's candidacy for another term as president. Ambongo later led a mission of bishops to Lusaka, Zambia, to meet with Zambian President Edgar Lungu to urge him to support holding peaceful elections in the D.R.C. in December 2018. In their message to Lungu, the bishops urged support for a "credible, transparent, inclusive and peaceful election" to solve "the socio-political crisis" plaguing the nation. Ambongo also celebrated a Mass in Zambia on 9 September 2018 urging Zambians never to lose peace in their nation.

On 30 May 2018, Ambongo issued a statement in Mbdanka-Bikoro announcing that there would be a suspension of those sacraments that require physical contact to administer due to an outbreak of Ebola in the area. He said that "this is to prevent the spread of Ebola hemorrhagic fever". He also advised giving the sign of peace verbally rather than physically.

Ambongo condemns the exploitation of natural resources and believes that renewables will help alleviate the impact of climate change in the world. In a 4 March 2015 interview in Rome, Ambongu said that "the future is this renewable energy, namely solar panels" in order to reduce climate change, highlighting solar panels as an effort to shift gradually to renewables. He continued that "we, as the Church, are not opposed to the exploration of natural resources", though asserted that such exploration needed to be both legal and transparent. Ambongo also collaborated with Cardinal Christoph Schönborn to secure a meeting between the German and Congo environmental ministers to discuss what the countries could do to improve the quality of the environment in their respective nations.

In March 2015 he reported that he has received death threats: "I am a person in danger in Congo." With a nervous laugh he told a French radio outlet: "I am in danger. This is true."

In June 2016 he was elected vice-president of the Episcopal Conference of the Congo (CENCO).

On 6 February 2018, Pope Francis appointed Ambongo the coadjutor for the Kinshasa archdiocese, to succeed Cardinal Laurent Monsengwo Pasinya upon his resignation. He was presented to the archdiocese as coadjutor on 11 March 2018. He became Archbishop when Francis accepted Pasinya's resignation on 1 November 2018. He was installed there on 25 November 2018.

On 5 October 2019, Pope Francis made him Cardinal-Priest of San Gabriele Arcangelo all'Acqua Traversa. He was made a member of the Congregation for Institutes of Consecrated Life and Societies of Apostolic Life on 21 February 2020. On 15 October 2020, Pope Francis appointed him to the Council of Cardinal Advisers. He participated as a cardinal elector in the 2025 papal conclave that elected Pope Leo XIV.

In February 2023, Ambongo was elected president of the Symposium of Episcopal Conferences of Africa and Madagascar (SECAM).

In this role he wrote a statement insisting the bishops of Africa enjoy communion with Pope Francis, Cardinal Ambongo Besungu said African Bishops nevertheless "believe that the extra-liturgical blessings proposed in the declaration Fiducia Supplicans cannot be carried out in Africa without exposing themselves to scandals."

Following his opposition to Fiducia Supplicans, he wrote a document with Cardinal Víctor Manuel Fernández that refuses any blessing of homosexual couples, arguing that such blessings "cannot be carried out in Africa without exposing themselves to scandals". It was submitted to Pope Francis and also signed by Fernández. In a latter stated in an interview with French-language Catholic television channel KTO, Ambongo stated that the African rejection of the document was due it being perceived as "a kind of Western imperialism", and to force same-sex blessing on African culture would be akin to "cultural colonization".

In a 2024 audio recording, Ambongo can be heard saying Westerners have "decadent morals", since "they do not like children" he wishes them "a good demise".

In April 2024, the prosecutor general of the Court of Cassation ordered the opening of a judicial investigation against Fridolin Ambongo Besungu. Fridolin Ambongo Besungu is accused of seditious remarks constituting "false rumors, inciting populations to revolt and attacks against human lives".

== See also ==
- Cardinals created by Francis

== Bibliography ==
- La rehabilitation de "l'humain", base de developpement vrai au Zaïre : pour une étique de développement intégral, 1995 (doctoral dissertation).OCLC 312890625

Catholic Church titles
Preceded by Joseph Mokobe Ndjoku	Bishop of Bokungu–Ikela; 22 November 2004 – 12 November 2016	Succeeded by Toussaint Iluku Bolumbu
Preceded by Joseph Banga Bane	Vice-President of the Congolese Episcopal Conference; 24 June 2016 –	Incumbent
Preceded by Joseph Kumuondala Mbimba	Archbishop of Mbandaka–Bikoro; 12 November 2016 – 6 February 2018	Succeeded by Ernest Ngboko Ngombe
Preceded by Laurent Monsengwo Pasinya	Archbishop of Kinshasa; 1 November 2018 –	Incumbent
Preceded by José Manuel Estepa Llaurens	Cardinal-Priest of San Gabriele Arcangelo all'Acqua Traversa; 5 October 2019 –	Incumbent
