= Archdiocese of Kinshasa =

Roman Catholic archdiocese in the Democratic Republic of the Congo

Coordinates: 4.3238°S 15.2944°E

Archdiocese of Kinshasa Archidioecesis Kinshasana Archidiocèse de Kinshasa

Catholic
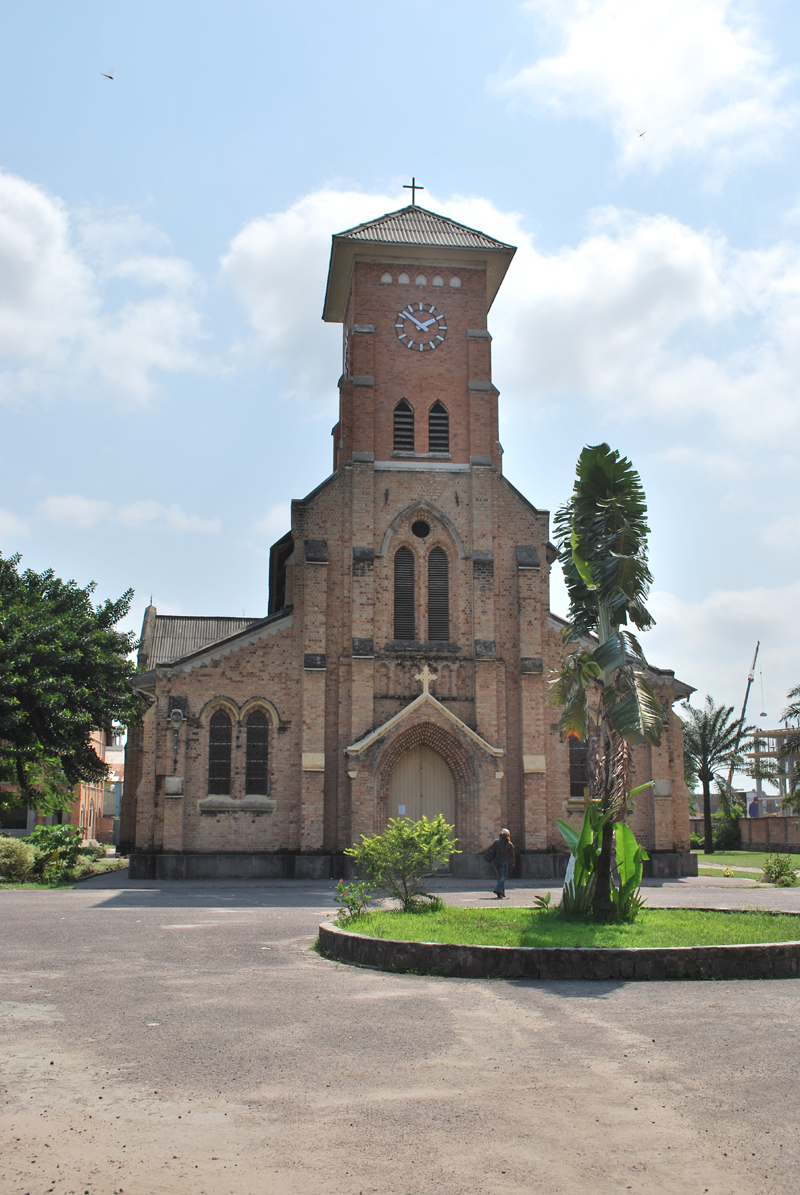
- St. Anne's Church in Gombe

Location
- Country: Democratic Republic of the Congo
- Territory: Kinshasa and surrounding districts
- Ecclesiastical province: Province of Kinshasa

Statistics
- Population: Total; Catholics: (as of 2016); 11,323,000; 6,378,000 (56.3%)
- Parishes: 143

Information
- Denomination: Roman Catholic
- Rite: Roman Rite
- Established: 22 November 1888
- Cathedral: Our Lady of the Congo Cathedral
- Secular priests: 238

Current leadership
- Pope: Leo XIV
- Archbishop: Fridolin Ambongo Besungu, OFM Cap
- Auxiliary Bishops: Charles Ndaka Salabisala; Edouard Isango Nkoyo; Edouard Tsimba Ngoma, C.I.C.M

The Archdiocese of Kinshasa (Latin: Archidioecesis Kinshasana; French: Archidiocèse de Kinshasa; Lingala: Archidiocèse ya Kinshasa) is an archdiocese of the Roman Catholic Church in the Democratic Republic of the Congo. Its ecclesiastic territory includes the capital city of Kinshasa and surrounding districts. The archdiocese is the metropolitan see for the Ecclesiastical Province of Kinshasa. The current archbishop is Fridolin Ambongo Besungu.

Established as the Apostolic Vicariate of the Belgian Congo by Pope Leo XIII in 1888, it was raised to the status of an archdiocese in 1959. In 1966, its name was changed from the Archdiocese of Léopoldville to the Archdiocese of Kinshasa. Today, the archdiocese covers a territory of 8,500 km^{2} (3,283 sq mi) and, as of 2016, has a total population of 11,323,000, of whom 6,378,000 (56.3%) are Catholic. The archdiocese is served by 1,208 priests, including 238 diocesan priests and 970 religious priests, 1,661 male religious (including religious priests and brothers), and 1,982 religious sisters. The archdiocese has 143 parishes, including the Cathedral of Our Lady of the Congo in Kinshasa.

== History ==
The archdiocese was established on 22 November 1886, as the Mission sui iuris of the Belgian Congo, from territory taken from both the Apostolic Prefecture of Lower Congo (in Cubango, Angola) and the Apostolic Vicariate of Two Guineas (in Gabon). It was promoted on 11 May 1888, as the Apostolic Vicariate of Belgian Congo. Over time, it lost territory repeatedly: to establish the Mission sui juris of Kwango on 18 April 1892, the Apostolic Prefecture of Uélé on 12 May 1898, the Mission sui juris of Kasaï Supérieur on 26 July 1901, the Apostolic Prefecture of Stanley Falls on 3 August 1904, the Apostolic Prefecture of Ubangui Belge on 7 April 1911, and the Apostolic Prefecture of Matadi and the Apostolic Prefecture of Northern Katanga on 1 July 1911.

On 3 April 1919, it was renamed the Apostolic Vicariate of Léopoldville. It lost territory several times more: to establish the Mission sui juris of Bikoro on 3 January 1931, the Apostolic Vicariate of Boma on 26 February 1934, the Apostolic Prefecture of Kole on 14 June 1951, and the Apostolic Vicariate of Inongo on 29 June 1953. It was elevated on 10 November 1959 as the Archdiocese of Léopoldville, when the city was soon to become the national capital of the newly independent Republic of the Congo. It was renamed the Archdiocese of Kinshasa on 30 May 1966, when the city's name was changed from Léopoldville to Kinshasa. The archdiocese was visited by Pope John Paul II in May 1980 and again in August 1985.

== Bishops ==
=== Ordinaries ===
Apostolic Vicars of the Belgian Congo

- François Camille Van Ronslé, C.I.C.M. (1896-1919); see below

Apostolic Vicars of Léopoldville

- François Camille Van Ronslé, C.I.C.M. (1919-1926); see above
- Natale de Cleene, C.I.C.M. (1926-1932)
- Georges Six, C.I.C.M. (1934-1952)
- Félix Scalais, C.I.C.M. (1953-1959); see below

Archbishops of Léopoldville

- Félix Scalais, C.I.C.M. (1959-1964); see above
- Joseph Malula (1964-1966); future Cardinal; see below

Archbishops of Kinshasa

- Joseph Malula (1966-1989) (Cardinal in 1969); see above
- Frédéric Etsou-Nzabi-Bamungwabi, C.I.C.M. (1990-2007) (Cardinal in 1991)
- Laurent Monsengwo Pasinya (2007-2018) (Cardinal in 2010)
- Fridolin Ambongo Besungu, O.F.M. Cap. (2018–present) (Cardinal in 2019)

=== Coadjutor bishops ===
- Noël de Cleene, C.I.C.M. (1924-1926), as Coadjutor vicar apostolic
- Fridolin Ambongo Besungu, O.F.M. Cap. (2018); future Cardinal

=== Auxiliary Bishops of Kinshasa ===
- Joseph Malula (1959-1964), appointed Archbishop here; future Cardinal
- Eugène Moke Motsüri (1970-1991)
- Tharcisse Tshibangu Tshishiku (1970-1991), appointed Bishop of Mbujimayi
- Dominique Bulamatari (1999-2009), appointed Bishop of Molegbe
- Edouard Kisonga Ndinga, S.S.S. (1999–2022), retired
- Daniel Nlandu Mayi (1999-2008), appointed Coadjutor Bishop of Matadi
- Timothée Bodika Mansiyai, P.S.S. (2012-2016), appointed Bishop of Kikwit
- Sébastien-Joseph Muyengo Mulombe (2012-2013), appointed Bishop of Uvira
- Donatien Bafuidinsoni Maloko-Mana, S.J. (2015-2018), appointed Bishop of Inongo
- Jean-Pierre Kwambamba Masi (2015-2018), appointed Bishop of Kenge
- Jean-Crispin Kimbeni Ki Kanda (2020-2022), appointed Bishop of Kisantu
- Vincent Tshomba Shamba Kotsho (2020-2022), appointed Bishop of Tshumbe
- Charles Ndaka Salabisala (2020-)
- Edouard Isango Nkoyo (2023-)
- Edouard Tsimba Ngoma (2023-)

== Suffragan dioceses ==
The Archdiocese of Kinshasa is the metropolitan archdiocese of the Ecclesiastical Province of Kinshasa, which includes the following suffragan dioceses:

- Boma
- Idiofa
- Inongo
- Kenge
- Kikwit
- Kisantu
- Matadi
- Popokabaka

== Apostolic regions ==
=== Kin – centre ===
Deanery	Parish	Year established
Saint Peter Deanery	St. Peter	1933
	St. Anne	1913
	St. Paul	1946
	Our Lady of the Congo	1947
	Our Lady of Fatima (Notre-Dame de Fatima)	1955
	St. Andrew	1964
	St. Eloi	1964
	Sacré-Coeur	1965
	St. Rombaut	1966
	St. Muzeyi	1970
	St. Kiwanuka	1980
Saint Joseph Deanery	St. Joseph	1956
	Christ-Roi	1951
	St. Pius X	1956
	St. Maria Goretti	1959
	St. Anthony	1963
	St. Vincent de Paul	1965
	St. John the Baptist	1967
	St. Clement	1970
	St. Christ the Savior (Kristu Mobikisi)	1980
	St. Clare	1990
	St. Agatha	2003
Saint Gabriel Deanery	St. Gabriel	1955
	St. Dominic	1958
	St. Raphael	1958
	St. Augustine	1959
	St. Matthias	1961
	St. Adrian	1962
	St. Felix	1962
	St. Christine	1963
	St. Lawrence	1971
	St. Benedict	1992
	Notre-Dame d'Afrique	1993
	St. Amand	2001
Saint Alphonse Deanery	St. Alphonse	1954
	St. Esprit	1959
	St. Stephen	1962
	St. Kizito	1965
	Bon Pasteur	1968
	St. Thomas	1970
	St. Mary Magdalene	1970
	St. Trinité	1979
	Résurrection	1980
	St. John the Apostle	1981
	Nativité	1985
	St. Cyril	1985
	St. Gonza	1986
	St. Bernadette	1987
	St. Bernard	1992
	St. Felicity	1992
	St. Ambrose	1993

=== Kin – East ===
Deanery	Parish	Year established
Sainte Thérèse Deanery	St. Thérèse	1954
	St. Martin	1963
	St. Famille	1963
	St. Agnes	1964
	St. Mbaga	1966
	Coeur Immaculé de Marie	1980
	St. Monica	1985
	St. Timothy	1985
	St. Francis Xavier	1990
	Divin Maître	2000
	Mary Help of Christians	2004
Saint Mark Deanery	St. Mark	1961
	St. Theophile	1963
	Croix	1975
	St. Boniface	1980
	St. Frederick	1980
	St. Kibuka	1980
	Mama wa Boboto	1980
	St. Bartholomew	1985
	Mama wa Bosawa	1985
	St. Athanasius	1990
	Bisengo Mwambe	1991
	St. Hilaire	2001
	St. Banabakintu	2004
Saint James Deanery	St. James	1961
	St. Matthew	1956
	St. Ngondwe Pontien	1980
	Mary Mother of the Church	1982
	St. Eugene	1990
	St. Martha	1990
	St. Angela	1991
	Blessed Bakanja	1991
	St. Yves	1993
	St. Lucy	1999
	Our Lady of Perpetual Help	2003

=== Kin – West ===
Deanery	Parish	Year established
Saint Cyprian Deanery	St. Cyprian	1970
	St. Mukasa	1974
	St. Gyavira	1980
	St. Tharcisius	1985
	St. Leonard	1989
	Don Bosco	1990
	St. Elizabeth	1993
	St. Perpetua	1993
	St. Damien	1995
	St. Maurice	2000
Saint Francis Deanery	St. Francis de Sales	1939
	St. Leopold	1899
	St. Michael	1955
	St. Charles Lwanga	1961
	St. Luke	1964
	St. Philip	1969
	St. Albert	1989
Saint Mawaggali Deanery	St. Mawaggali	1974
	Our Lady of Wisdom	1954
	Christ the Consoler (Kristu Molobeli)	1980
	St. Peter Claver	1984
	St. Maximilian Kolbe	1985
	Queen of the Apostles	1988
	St. Norbert	1988
Blessed Sacrament Deanery	Blessed Sacrament	1958
	St. Christopher	1960
	Ntombwa ya Maria	1980
	Blessed Anuarite	1980
	St. Leo	1981
	St. Ignatius	1982
	St. Camillus	1988
	Our Lady of Grace	1989
	St. Catherine	1992
	Martyrs of Uganda	2002
	St. Edward	2005

=== Military vicariate ===
Institution	Parish	Location (camp)
Armed Forces of the Democratic Republic of the Congo	St. Barbara	Kokolo Camp
	St. Sebastian	Tshatshi Camp
	St. Michael the Archangel	CETA Camp
	St. Cornelius	Officers' Camp (Camp des Officiers) – Badiadingi
	St. Joan of Arc	Loano Camp
	Our Lady of the Rosary	Mbaki Camp – Ndolo
Congolese National Police (PNC)	St. Serunkuma	Lufungula Camp
	St. George	Police Training Camp – Matete

== See also ==
- Catholic Church in the Democratic Republic of the Congo
- List of Catholic dioceses in the Democratic Republic of the Congo

== Source and External links ==
- GCatholic.org, with incumbent biography links
- "Archdiocese of Kinshasa". Catholic-Hierarchy.org. David M. Cheney.
