= List of cathedrals in the Democratic Republic of the Congo =

This is the list of cathedrals in the Democratic Republic of the Congo.

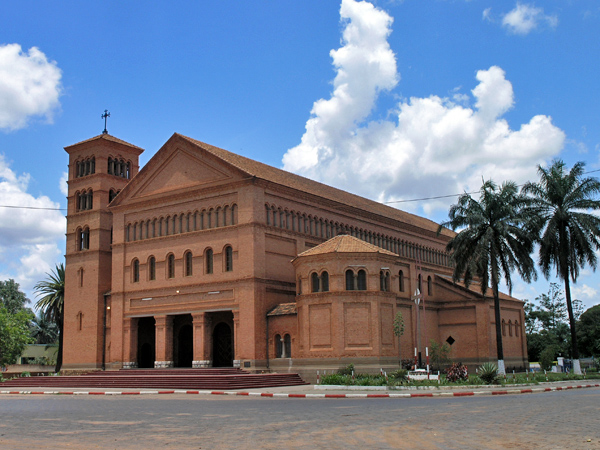
Cathédrale Saints Pierre et Paul in Lubumbashi.

== Catholic ==
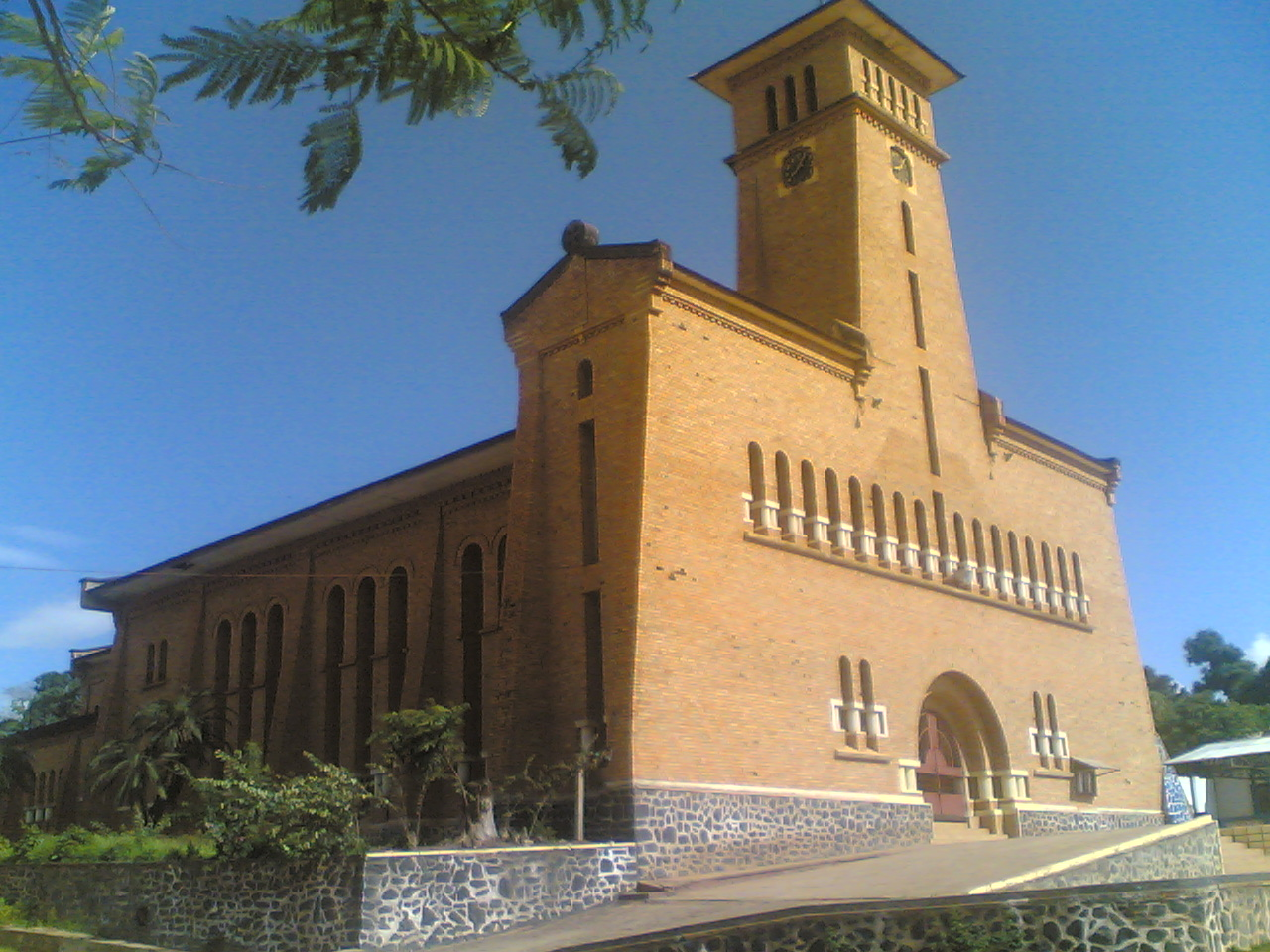
Boma Cathedral

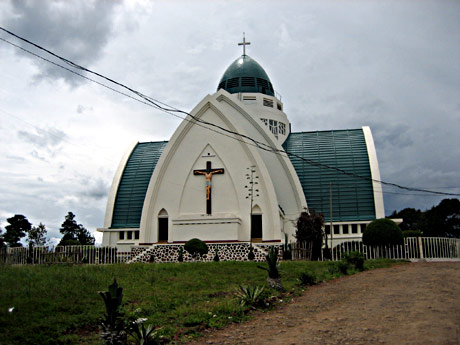
Bukavu Cathedral

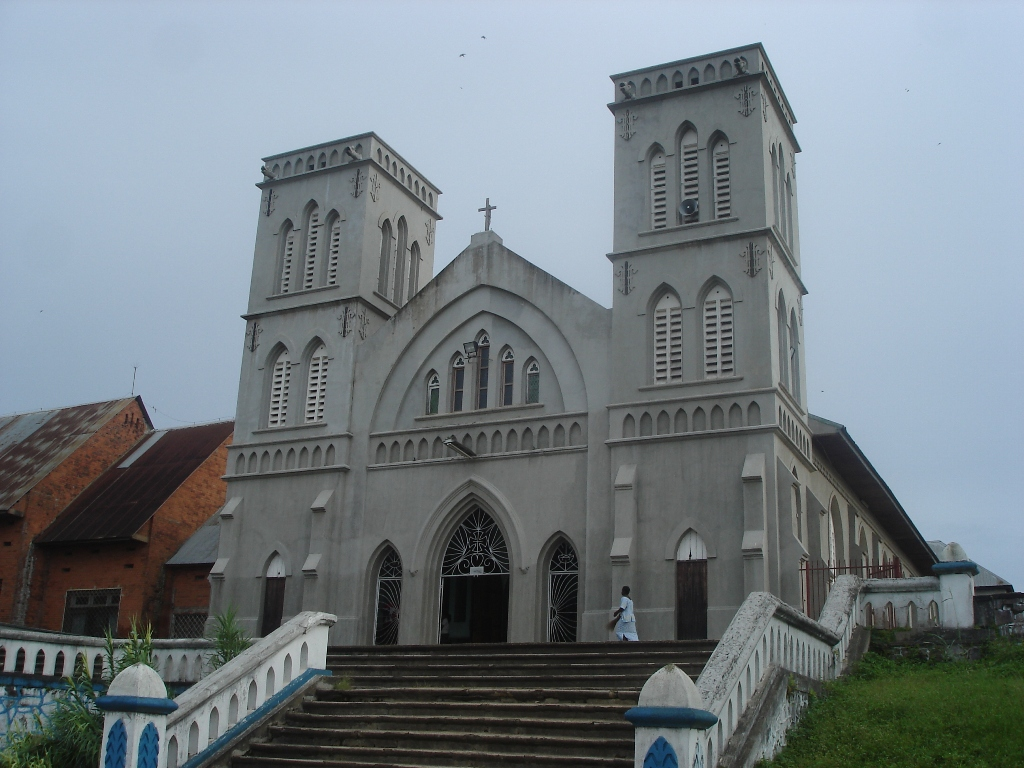
Kisangani Cathedral

Cathedrals of the Catholic Church in the Democratic Republic of the Congo:

- Cathedral of Sts. Peter and Paul in Basankusu
- Cathedral of Our Lady of the Assumption in Boma
- Cathedral of the Holy Cross in Bondo
- Cathedral of Our Lady of Peace in Bukavu
- Cathedral of St. Andrew in Butembo
- Cathedral of St. Joseph in Goma
- Cathédrale Saint Kizito in Idiofa
- Cathedral of St. Albert in Inongo
- Cathedral of Mary the Mediatrix in Isangi
- Cathedral of Christ the King in Kalemie
- Cathedral of St. Joseph Mikalayi in Kazumba
- Cathedral of St. Charles Borromeo in Kasongo
- Cathedral of St. Andrew in Kilwa
- Co-Cathedral of the Holy Cross in Kasenga
- Cathedral of Our Lady in Kinshasa
- Cathedral of Our Lady of the Rosary in Kisangani
- Cathedral of Our Lady of Seven Sorrows in Kisantu
- Cathedral of St. Hermes in Lisala
- Cathedral of Sts. Peter and Paul in Lubumbashi
- Cathedral of St. Eugene in Mbandaka
- Cathedral of St. Anthony of Padua in Molegbe

== See also ==
- List of cathedrals
- Christianity in the Democratic Republic of the Congo
