= Dieudonné Madrapile Tanzi =

Congolese Catholic prelate (born in 1958)

The Most Reverend Dieudonné Madrapile Tanzi
- Bishop of Isiro-Niangara, Democratic Republic of the Congo
- Church: Catholic Church
- Archdiocese: Roman Catholic Archdiocese of Kisangani
- See: Roman Catholic Diocese of Isiro-Niangara
- Appointed: 23 September 2024
- Installed: 23 September 2024
- Predecessor: Julien Andavo Bule Ahuba Mbia
- Successor: Incumbent
- Other posts: Bishop of Isangi (2 April 2016 - 23 September 2024); Apostolic Administrator of Isangi (since 23 September 2024)

Orders
- Ordination: 25 August 1985
- Consecration: 10 July 2016 by Marcel Utembi Tapa
- Rank: Bishop

Personal details
- Born: Dieudonné Madrapile Tanzi; 18 August 1958 (age 67) Niangara, Haut-Uélé, DR Congo

Styles of Dieudonné Madrapile Tanzi
- Reference style: Your Lordship; The Most Reverend
- Spoken style: His Lordship
- Religious style: Archbishop

Dieudonné Madrapile Tanzi (born 18 August 1958) is a Congolese Catholic prelate who serves as Bishop of the Roman Catholic Diocese of Isiro-Niangara, DR Congo, since, 23 September 2024. He concurrently serves as the Apostolic Administrator of the Roman Catholic Diocese of Isangi, DR Congo since 23 September 2024. Before that, from 2 April 2016 until 23 September 2024, he was the bishop of the Roman Catholic Diocese of Isangi. He concurrently served as apostolic administrator of Isiro-Niangara Diocese from 12 July 2024 until 23 September 2024. He was appointed bishop on 2 April 2016 by Pope Francis. He was consecrated and installed at Isangi on 10 July 2016 by Archbishop Marcel Utembi Tapa, Archbishop of Kisangani.

== Background and education ==
He was born on 18 August 1958, in Niangara, Haut-Uélé, Democratic Republic of the Congo. He studied philosophy and Theology at a seminary. Later, from 2006 until 2013, he studied at the Pontifical Urban University in Rome, Italy, where he obtained a Doctorate in missiology.

== Priest ==
He was ordained a priest of the Roman Catholic Diocese of Isiro-Niangara on 25 August 1985. He served as a priest until 2 April 2016.

As a priest, he served in many positions of responsibility, including:

- Formator in Rungu Minor Seminary from 1985 until 1986.
- Teacher and spiritual animator of the Saint Augustin Interdiocesan Major Seminary of Philosophy, Kisangani, from 1986 until 1996.
- Vicar General of the diocese of Isiro-Niangara from 1996 until 2001.
- Diocesan administrator of Isiro-Niangara from 2001 until 2003.
- Rector of the Blessed Anuarite National Marian Shrine from 2003 until 2006.
- Chaplain of the Daughters of Saint Mary of Providence, Opera Don Guanella, Rome, from 2012 until 2016.
- Professor of pastoral theology at the Pontifical Urban University from 2012 until 2016.
- Apostolic administrator of the diocese of Isiro-Niangara from 12 July 2024 until 23 September 2024.

== As bishop ==
On 2 April 2016, Pope Francis appointed him as bishop of the Roman Catholic Diocese of Isangi, DRC. He was consecrated and installed at Isangi, Democratic Republic of the Congo, on 10 July 2016 by the hands of Archbishop Marcel Utembi Tapa, Archbishop of Kisangani, assisted by Bishop Julien Andavo Bule Ahuba Mbia, Bishop of Isiro-Niangara, and Bishop Richard Domba Mady, Bishop of Doruma-Dungu.

Bishop Tanzi briefly served as Apostolic Administrator of the diocese of Isiro-Niangara from 12 July 2024 until 23 September 2024. He has served concurrently as apostolic administrator of Isangi since 23 September 2024. Following the death of Bishop Julien Andavo Bule Ahuba Mbia formerly, bishop of Isiro-Niangara, on 14 July 2024, the Holy Father appointed Bishop Dieudonné Madrapile Tanzi as the new bishop of the vacant see, transferring him from the diocese of Isangi on 23 September 2024.

== See also ==
- Catholic Church in the Democratic Republic of the Congo

== Succession table ==
Catholic Church titles
Preceded by Camille Lembi Zaneli (2 June 2000 - 8 July 2011)	Bishop of Isangi (2 April 2016 - 23 September 2024)	Succeeded by Vacant
Preceded by Julien Andavo Bule Ahuba Mbia (1 February 2003 - 14 Jul 2024)	Bishop of Isiro-Niangara (since 23 September 2024)	Succeeded by Incumbent
