= Léonard Ndjadi Ndjate =

Congolese Catholic prelate (born 1976)

The Most Reverend Léonard Ndjadi Ndjate
- Auxiliary Bishop of Kisangani, Democratic Republic of the Congo
- Church: Catholic Church
- Archdiocese: Roman Catholic Archdiocese of Kisangani
- See: Kisangani
- Appointed: 13 May 2023
- Installed: 13 August 2023
- Other post: Titular Bishop of Casae in Numidia (since 13 May 2023)

Orders
- Ordination: 13 August 2006
- Consecration: 13 August 2023 by Cardinal Fridolin Ambongo Besungu
- Rank: Bishop

Personal details
- Born: Léonard Ndjadi Ndjate; 2 January 1976 (age 50) Yanonge, Archdiocese of Kisangani, Tshopo Province, DR Congo
- Motto: "Delectare in Domino" ("To find joy in the Lord")

Styles of Léonard Ndjadi Ndjate
- Reference style: Your Lordship; The Most Reverend
- Spoken style: His Lordship
- Religious style: Bishop

Léonard Ndjadi Ndjate M.C.C.I. (born 2 January 1976) is a Congolese Catholic prelate who is auxiliary bishop of the Roman Catholic Archdiocese of Kisangani in the Democratic Republic of the Congo since 13 May 2023. Before that, from 13 August 2006 until he was appointed bishop, he was a priest of the Comboni Missionaries of the Heart of Jesus, a Roman Catholic religious order. He was appointed bishop on 13 May 2023 by Pope Francis, to work with and assist Archbishop Marcel Utembi Tapa. He was consecrated and installed at Kisangani on 13 August 2023 by Cardinal Fridolin Ambongo Besungu, Archbishop of Kinshasa.

== Background and education ==
He was born on 2 January 1976 in Yanonge, Archdiocese of Kisangani, Tshopo Province, DR Congo. In 1995 he entered the Order of the Comboni Missionaries of the Heart of Jesus. He studied for one year as a novice. He then studied philosophy at the Edith Stein Philosophicum in Kisangani. He followed that with studies in theology at the Institut Saint Eugène de Mazenod in Kinshasa. Later, in 2015, he graduated with a Licentiate in spiritual theology, awarded by the Pontifical Gregorian University, in Rome, Italy, having studied there from 2013 until 2015.

== Priest ==
He took his perpetual vows as a member of the Comboni Missionaries of the Heart of Jesus on 10 October 2005. On 13 August 2006, he was ordained a priest of that religious order. He served as a priest until 13 May 2023.

While a priest, he served in various roles including as:

- Parish priest in Bangui, Central African Republic from 2006 until 2013.
- Provincial counsellor in Bangui, CAR from 2006 until 2013.
- Master of novices at the International Novitiate of the Combonians for Francophone Africa in Cotonou, Benin from 2015 until 2019.
- Provincial superior of the Congregation of the Comboni Missionaries of the Heart of Jesus for the Democratic Republic of Congo from 2020 until 2023.

== As bishop ==
On 13 May 2023, Pope Francis appointed Father Monsignor Léonard Ndjadi Ndjate, as Auxiliary Bishop of the Roman Catholic Archdiocese of Kisangani. He was contemporaneously assigned Titular Bishop of Casae in Numidia. He was consecrated and installed at Kisangani, DR Congo on 13 August 2023 by Cardinal Fridolin Ambongo Besungu, Archbishop of Kinshasa assisted by Archbishop Marcel Utembi Tapa, Archbishop of Kisangani and Bishop Julien Andavo Mbia, Bishop of Isiro-Niangara.

== See also ==
- Catholic Church in the Democratic Republic of the Congo

== Succession table ==
Catholic Church titles
Preceded by	Auxiliary Bishop of Kisangani (since 13 May 2023)	Succeeded by
