= Hewa Bora Airways Flight 952 =

2011 aviation accident in the Democratic Republic of the Congo

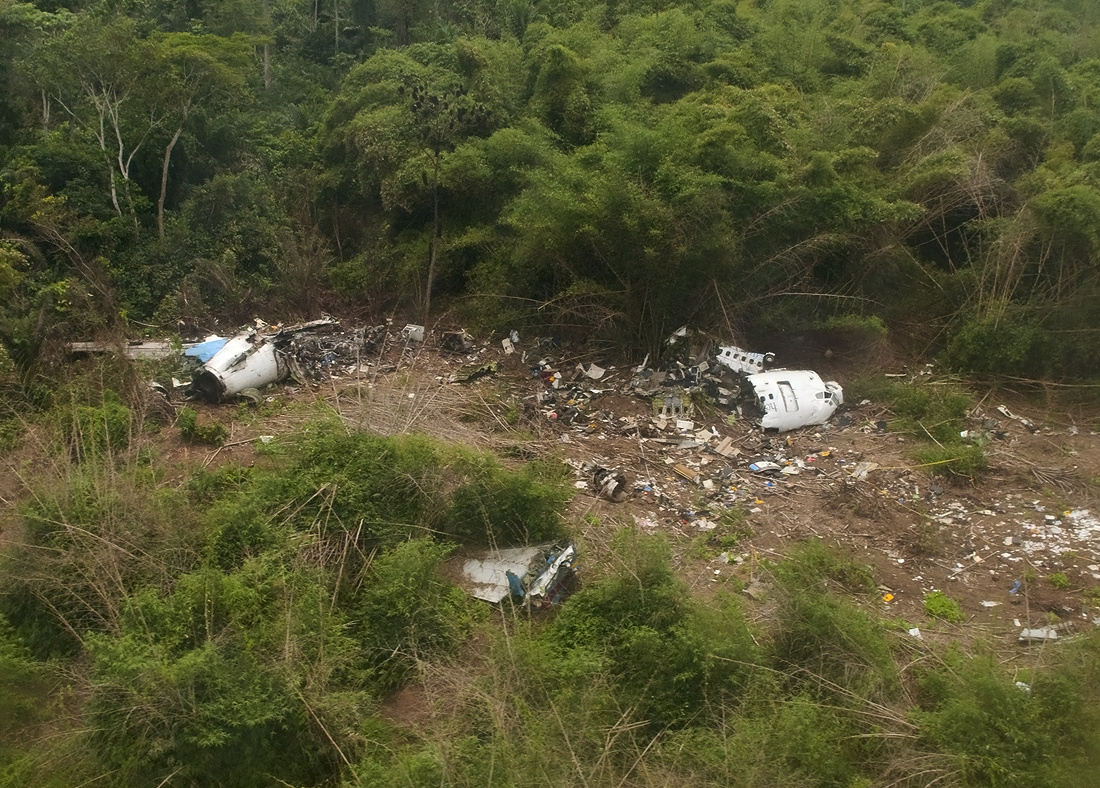
- Wreckage of the aircraft

Accident
- Date: 8 July 2011
- Summary: Controlled flight into terrain
- Site: Bangoka International Airport, Kisangani, Democratic Republic of the Congo; 0°28′13″N 25°21′17″E

Aircraft
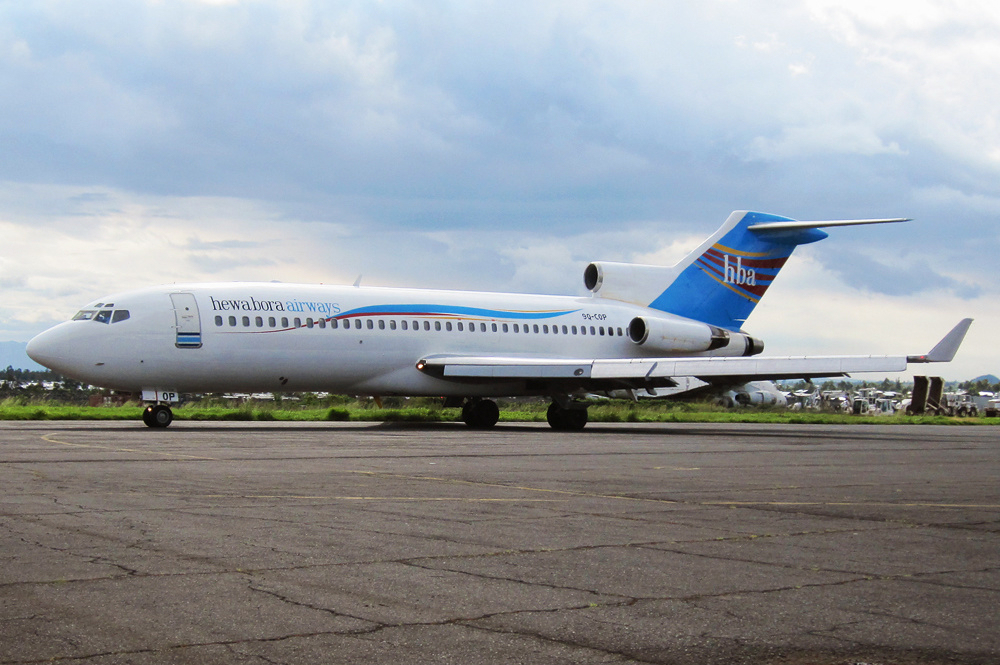
- 9Q-COP, the aircraft involved in the accident, seen in 2010
- Aircraft type: Boeing 727-022
- Operator: Hewa Bora Airways
- IATA flight No.: EO952
- ICAO flight No.: ALX952
- Call sign: ALLCONGO 952
- Registration: 9Q-COP
- Flight origin: N'djili Airport, Kinshasa, Democratic Republic of the Congo
- Destination: Bangoka International Airport, Kisangani, Democratic Republic of the Congo
- Occupants: 115
- Passengers: 108
- Crew: 7
- Fatalities: 77
- Injuries: 38
- Survivors: 38

On 8 July 2011, Hewa Bora Airways Flight 952, a Boeing 727 passenger jet on a domestic flight from Kinshasa, to Kisangani, Democratic Republic of the Congo (DRC), crashed on final approach at Kisangani, killing 77 of the 115 people on board.

== Accident ==
Hewa Bora Airways Flight 952 had taken off on 8 July from Kinshasa's N'djili Airport with 112 passengers and 6 crew on board bound for Kisangani Airport. At around 15:00 local time, the aircraft attempted an approach reportedly to Kisangani's runway 13, but the approach was discontinued. The aircraft then approached the opposite runway 31, but impacted terrain about 400 metres (1,300 ft; 440 yd) from the runway threshold.

At the time, thunderstorms and poor visibility were reported in the area, and Kisangani Airport had no official instrument approach procedure published, although a VOR/DME procedure was available commercially.

Reports on the number of casualties initially varied, with the final toll reaching 77 fatalities and 38 injuries.

== Aircraft ==
The aircraft involved was a Boeing 727-022 with Congolese registration 9Q-COP, s/n 18323. It was first delivered to United Airlines in 1965 and had served with Korean Air, World Airways, and Ladeco before it was acquired by Hewa Bora Airways in April 2010.

The aircraft had previously operated in the DRC under the Swaziland registration 3D-BOC. That registration was cancelled in 2005 and the aircraft was then operated under the São Tomé and Príncipe register as S9-DBM, but investigators could not obtain any certificate of registration proving the transfer. In 2010, the aircraft was finally registered to the DRC as 9Q-COP. At the time of the accident, the Boeing 727 was 45 years old and had flown for over 52,000 hours.

== Casualties ==
The casualties of the flight were:

	Killed	Survivors	Total
Crew	5	2	7
Passengers	72	36	108

An early investigation found that five victims were not originally included on the aircraft's manifest, and that some people were using tickets registered under other names. Among the victims was the Bishop of the Roman Catholic Diocese of Isangi, Camille Lembi Zaneli.

== Aftermath ==
The Ministry of Transport in the Democratic Republic of the Congo suspended Hewa Bora Airways air operator's certificate, citing repeated accidents occurred to the airline, including Flight 122 on 15 April 2008 and an accident involving Flight 601 at N'djili Airport on 21 June 2010.

== Investigation ==
A commission was set up to investigate the accident. A preliminary report was issued a month later, in August 2011, without data from the cockpit voice recorder nor flight data recorder, which had been sent to the US National Transportation Safety Board for analysis.

The commission found that the crew of Flight 952 had misjudged the weather conditions at destination, and that weather information provided to the crew by air traffic controllers at Kisangani was incorrect.

It also emerged that the captain of the aircraft was licensed to fly the MD-82 aircraft, but his type rating for the Boeing 727 had expired and was pending renewal. The control tower at Kisangani was found to be understaffed, and some of the air traffic controllers were not properly licensed. Both facilities that should have recorded all air traffic radio communications in the tower were also inoperative.
