= Basankusu Airport =

Basankusu Airstrip
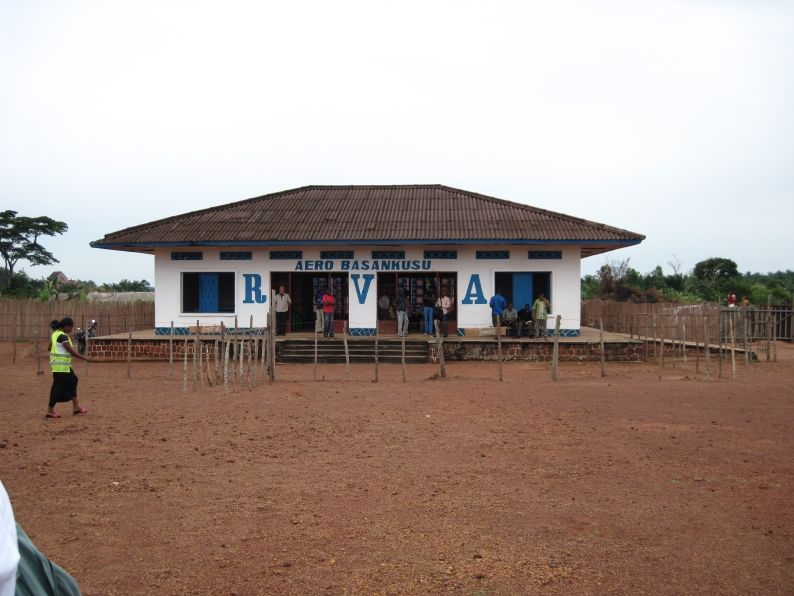
- IATA: BSU; ICAO: FZEN

Summary
- Airport type: Public
- Location: Basankusu, Democratic Republic of the Congo
- Elevation AMSL: 1,217 ft / 371 m
- Coordinates: 1°13′29″N 19°47′20″E

Map
- Location of Airport in the Democratic Republic of the Congo

Runways
| Direction | Length | | Surface |
| Direction | m | ft | Surface |
|---|---|---|---|
| 06/24 | 1,480 | 4,856 | Dirt |
- Sources: GCM Google Maps

Basankusu Airstrip (IATA: BSU, ICAO: FZEN, FAA LID: Basankusu Airport) is an airport serving Basankusu, a city on the Lulonga River in Équateur Province, Democratic Republic of the Congo.

The Basankusu non-directional beacon (Ident: BSU) is located on the field.

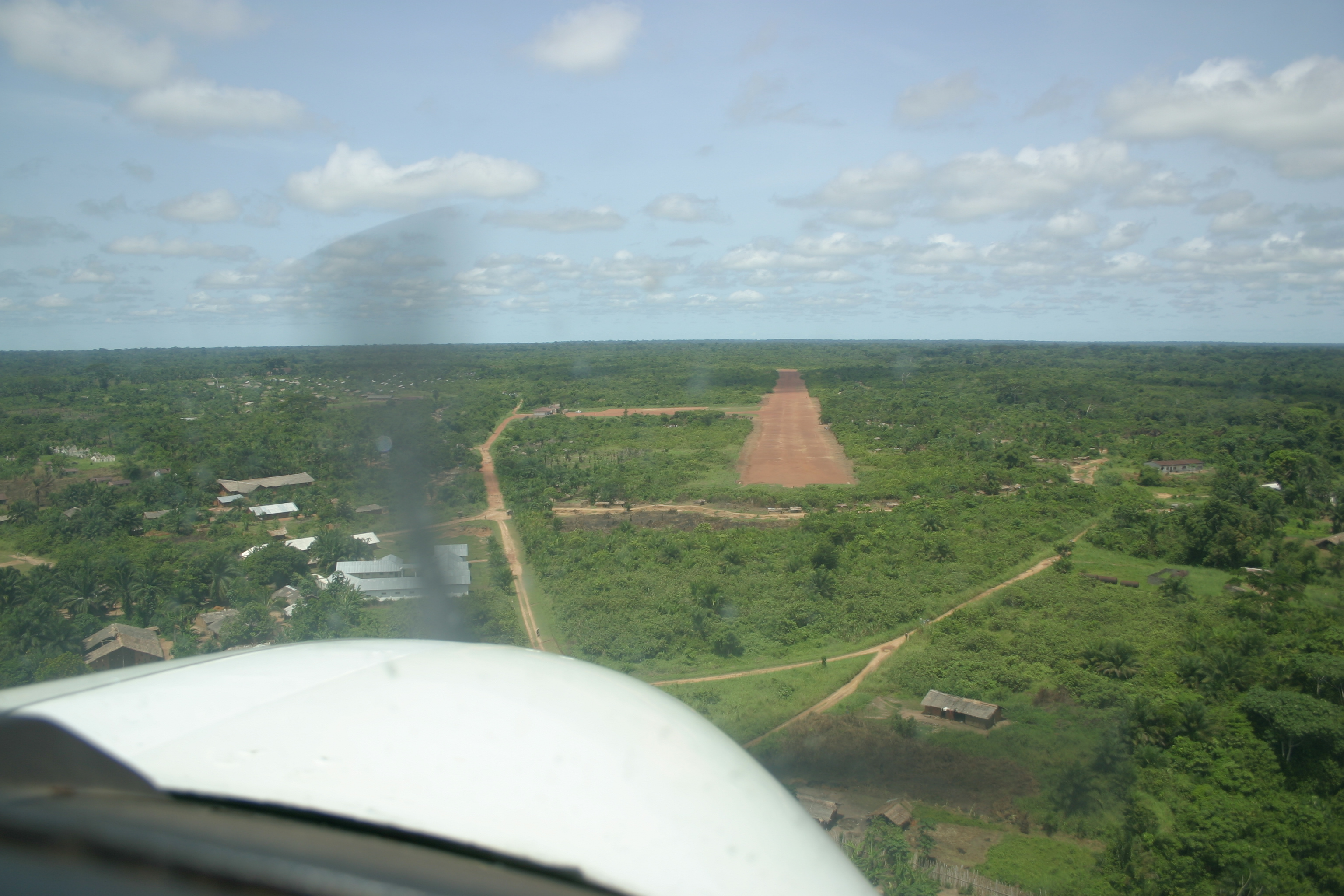
Landing at Basankusu Airport

== See also ==
- List of airports in the Democratic Republic of the Congo
- Transport in the Democratic Republic of the Congo
