= Camille Lembi Zaneli =

Congolese Roman Catholic bishop

- Bishop of Isangi
- Church: Catholic Church
- Diocese: Diocese of Isangi
- In office: 2 June 2000 – 8 July 2011
- Predecessor: Louis Mbwôl-Mpasi
- Successor: Dieudonné Madrapile Tanzi

Orders
- Ordination: 30 September 1979
- Consecration: 26 November 2000 by Laurent Monsengwo Pasinya

Personal details
- Born: 2 April 1950 Zongo, Équateur Province, Belgian Congo, Belgian Empire
- Died: 8 July 2011 (aged 61) Kisangani, Orientale Province, Democratic Republic of the Congo

Camille Lembi Zaneli (2 April 1950 – 8 July 2011) was the bishop of the Roman Catholic Diocese of Isangi, Democratic Republic of the Congo.

Zaneli was born on 2 April 1950, in Zongo, Belgian Congo. Ordained to the priesthood on 30 September 1979, He worked in seminaries in Kananga and Kinshasa. He also served as a parish priest for two parishes in Martinique in 1999.

He was appointed the bishop of Isangi by Pope John Paul II on 17 June 2000.

== Death ==
Bishop Zaneli was killed in the crash of Hewa Bora Airways Flight 952 at Bangoka International Airport, Kisangani, on 8 July 2011. He was 61 years old.
