= Sts. Peter and Paul Cathedral, Basankusu =

Sts. Peter and Paul Cathedral
- Cathédrale Saints-Pierre-et-Paul
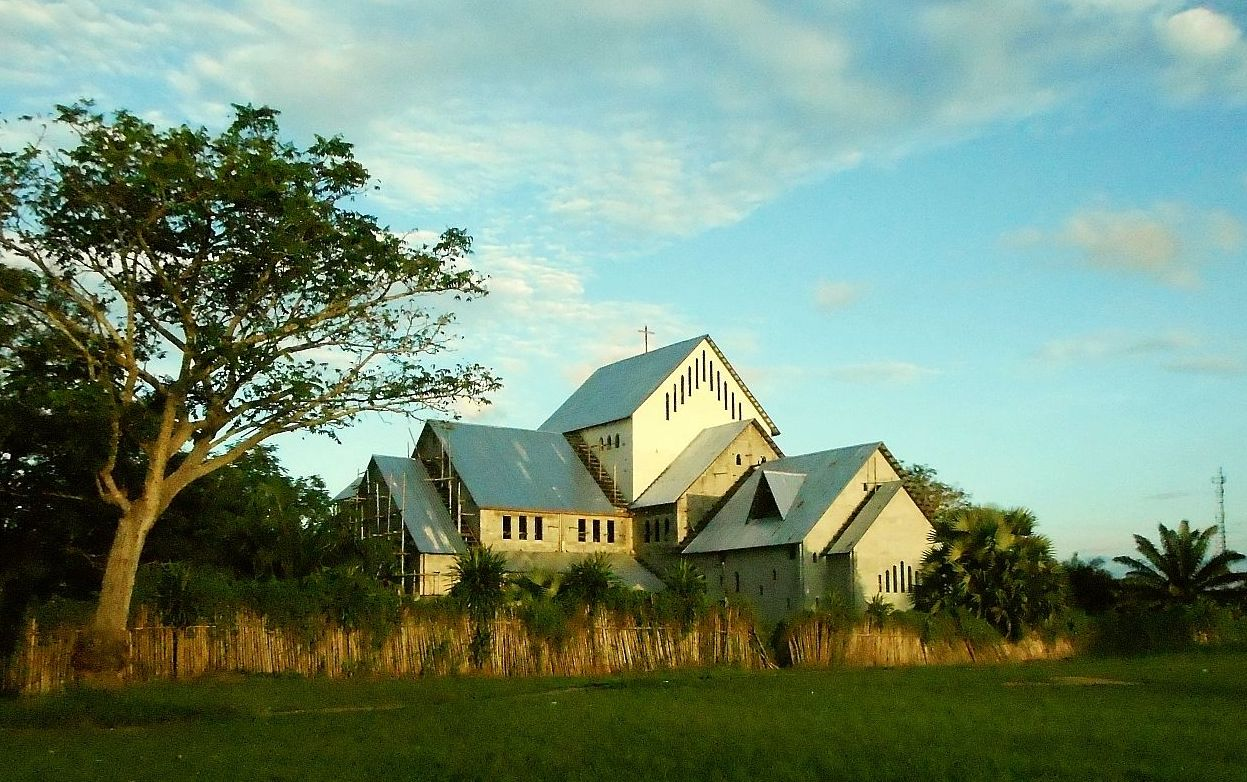
- Sts. Peter and Paul Cathedral
- 1.22123°N 19.79765°E
- Location: Basankusu
- Country: Democratic Republic of the Congo
- Denomination: Roman Catholic Church

The Cathedral of Saints Peter and Paul in Basankusu (French: Cathédrale Saints-Pierre-et-Paul ), or simply Basankusu Cathedral, is a parish church of the Roman Catholic Church in Basankusu, Équateur Province in the northwestern part of the Democratic Republic of the Congo. It is the mother church of the Diocese of Basankusu and seat of the Bishop of Basankusu, currently Joseph Mokobe Ndjoku.

The first church was built during the colonial era between 1939 and 1942 by Jan de Koning and the Saint Joseph's Missionary Society (Mill Hill Missionaries), in what was then the Apostolic Prefecture of Basankusu. It was elevated to cathedral status in 1959, with its elevation to diocesan status through the bull "Cum parvulum" of Pope John XXIII.

In 2012, this structure was demolished and rebuilt to a very similar design, using reinforced concrete in place of kiln-fired brick. Bishop Mokobe presided over the inauguration of the new building in October 2018.

== See also ==
- Catholic Church in the Democratic Republic of the Congo
