= Basankusu Territory =

- Interactive map of Basankusu Territory
- Coordinates: 1°13′20″N 19°48′10″E
- Country: Democratic Republic of the Congo
- Province: Équateur Province

Area
  - Total: 21,239 km^{2} (8,200 sq mi)
- Elevation: 371 m (1,217 ft)

Population
  - Total: 751,025
  - Density: 35.361/km^{2} (91.584/sq mi)
  - Languages: Lomongo Lingala French
- Time zone: UTC+1 (West Africa Time)

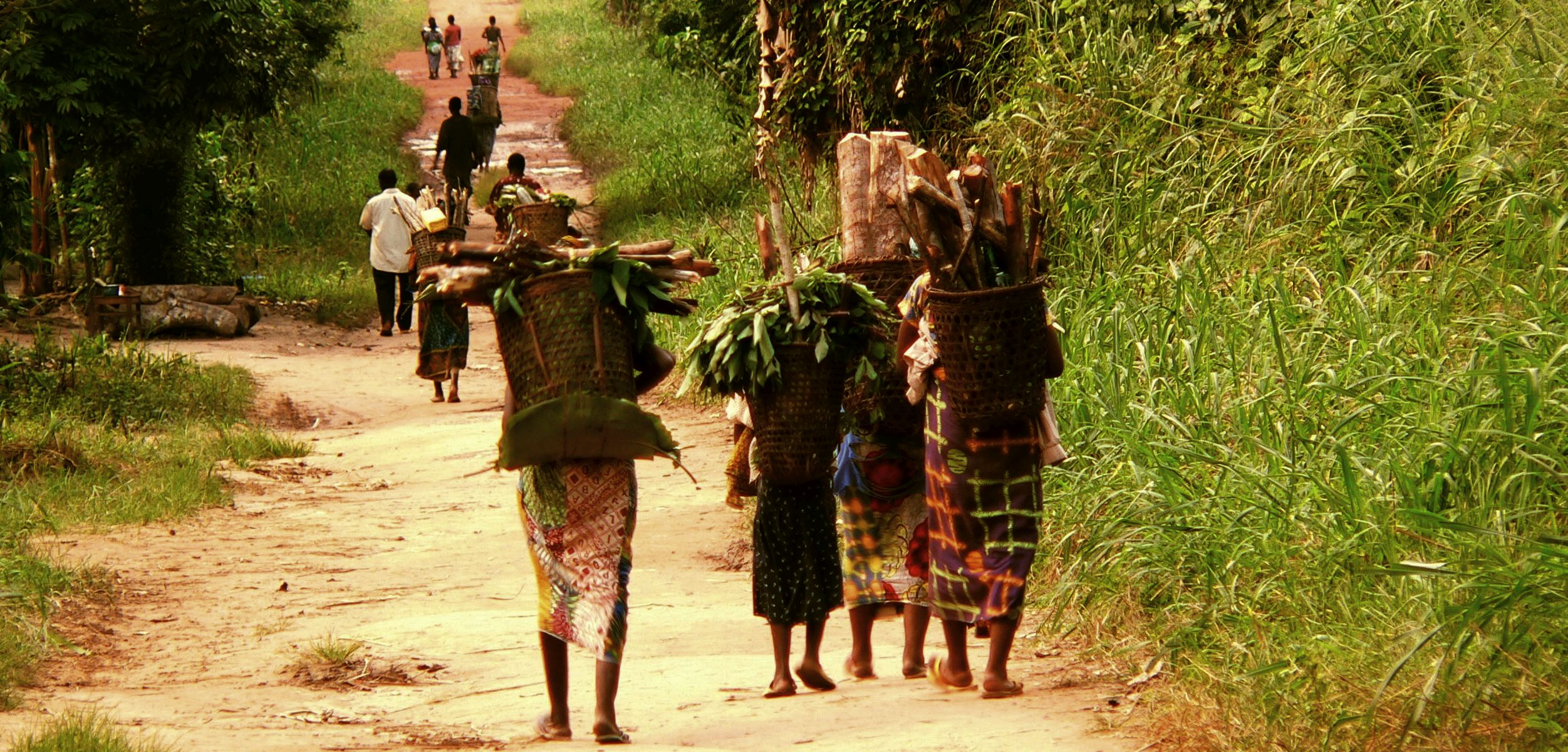
Women returning from the gardens with cassava and firewood.

Basankusu Territory is an administrative division of Équateur Province in the Democratic Republic of the Congo. The headquarters is the town of Basankusu.

Being slightly more than 1° north of the Equator, Basankusu has a tropical rainforest climate. There is no real dry season, with monthly rainfall in the town ranging between averages of 69 mm (2.7 in) and 213 mm (8.4 in), with most months at the higher end of that range. Average high temperatures over a year are between 30 and 33 °C (86 and 91 °F), although throughout the day a high of 37 °C (99 °F) is not uncommon. Evening lows average around 20 °C (68 °F).

Basankusu territory is divided into three sectors

- Waka-Bokeka, with 15 groupings of 110 villages
- Basankusu, with 11 groupings of 96 villages
- Gombalo, with 13 groupings of 117 villages
