= Isangi =

- Location within Democratic Republic of the Congo
- Coordinates: 0.7792°N 24.2715°E
- Country: Democratic Republic of the Congo
- Province: Tshopo
- Territory: Isangi Territory
- Climate: Af
- National language: Lingala

Isangi is a town in the Tshopo Province of the Democratic Republic of the Congo, headquarters of Isangi Territory.

== Location ==
Isangi is 130 kilometres (81 mi) downstream from Kisangani at the confluence of the Lomami and Congo rivers. There is a road running south from the town, but it is impassable in the rainy season. It rains every four or five days all year round, and there are frequent storms and tornadoes.

== Colonial era ==
Henry Morton Stanley, the first European to reach Isangi, passed through the town in December 1883 and estimated the population as 8,000. He described devastation caused by Arabs seeking slaves and ivory on the river. Although the people had begun to rebuild the town, they fled to the other bank of the river when Stanley's flotilla arrived. Stanley's sponsor, King Leopold II of Belgium, formally acquired rights to the Congo territory at the Conference of Berlin in 1885 and made the land his private property and named it the Congo Free State.

Arthur Conan Doyle noted in his book The Crime of the Congo that slavery and ivory poaching continued well after the Belgians had assumed power. In 1888, the Zanzibar-based trader Tippu Tip's nephew Rachid established a station at Isangi to provide a base for slaving operations in the lower reaches of the Lomani and along the channels of the Lopori and Maringa rivers.

There were positive aspects to the Arab incursion. At Isangi, as at other trading posts, the Arabs introduced new crops and new methods of cultivation. By the time the Belgians took control of the region, the Arabs had established thriving rice farms which produced a surplus of produce for sale. However, the new colonial administrators began requisitioning labor to work on the rubber plantations, lowering the output of rice.

== Recent times ==
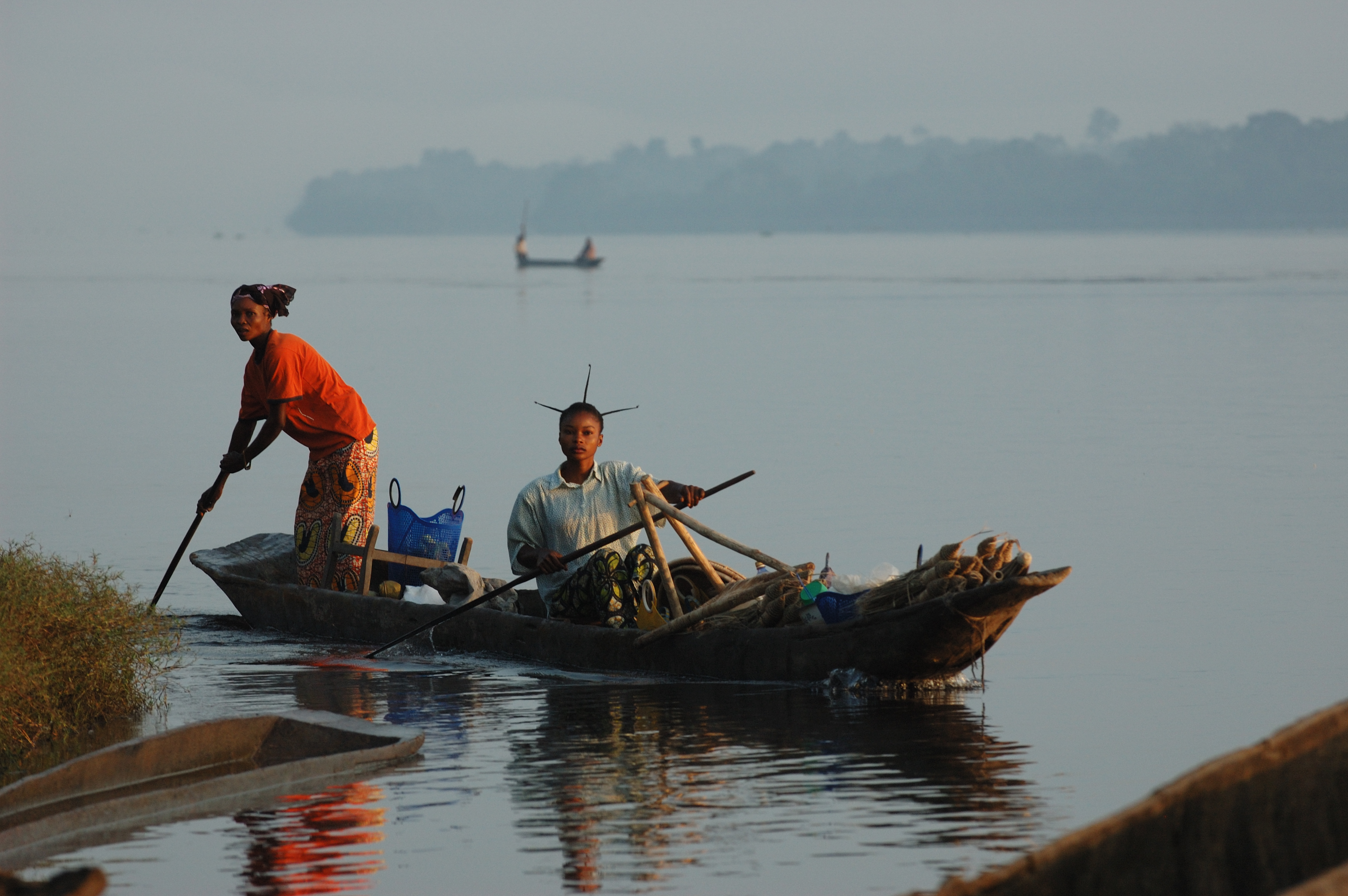
Isangi people living on the river Congo

A 1990 book described Isangi town as being mainly controlled by one influential merchant. At that time, the town had supplies of water and electricity, and had a telephone system. A new hospital was being built. However, the local farmers were not allowed to sell their rice in the market. The merchant wanted to revert to the practice of trading rice in exchange for goods or credit in his store.

The town is the seat of the Roman Catholic Diocese of Isangi in the Archdiocese of Kisangani. The Apostolic Prefecture of Isangi was established on 14 June 1951; on 2 July 1962, it was promoted to the Diocese of Isangi. The Cathédrale Marie Médiatrice is a landmark of the city.

== Sources ==
- Badidike, Jean-Pierre (2009). Guerre et droits de l'homme en République démocratique du Congo: regard du Groupe Justice et libération. Editions L'Harmattan. ISBN 978-2-296-07052-3.
- "Carte des Districts et Territoires de l'ORIENTALE" (PDF). Reliefweb. October 2002.
- Clarence-Smith, W. G. (1989). The Economics of the Indian Ocean slave trade in the nineteenth century. Routledge. ISBN 0-7146-3359-3.
- Doyle, Arthur Conan (1909). The Crime of the Congo. Doubleday, Page & Company. ISBN 9781427054616.
- "Diocese of Isangi Congo-Kinshasa". GCatholic.
- Griffon, Michel (1990). Economie des filières en régions chaudes: Formation des prix et échanges agricoles. Editions Quae. ISBN 2-87614-041-1.
- Keyes, Michael (September 2004). "The Congo Free State – a colony of gross excess".
- Knox, Alexander (2011). The Climate of the Continent of Africa. Cambridge University Press. ISBN 978-1-107-60071-3.
- Lemarchand, René (1964). Political awakening in the Belgian Congo. University of California Press.
- Oliver, Roland; Fage, John Donnelly; Sanderson, G. N. (1985). The Cambridge History of Africa. Cambridge University Press. ISBN 0-521-22803-4.
- Stanley, Henry Morton (1885). The Congo and the founding of its free state: a story of work and exploration. Sampson Low, Marston, Searle & Rivington. p. 169.
