= Our Lady of the Rosary Cathedral, Kisangani =

Our Lady of the Rosary Cathedral
- Cathédrale Notre-Dame du Rosaire
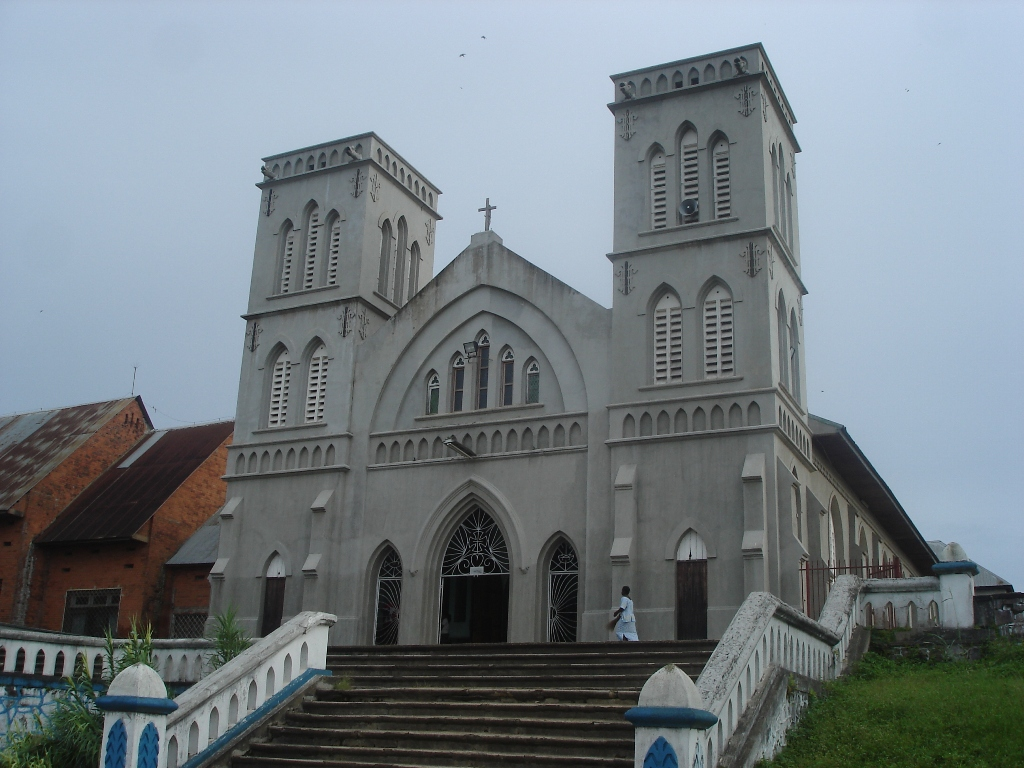
- Our Lady of the Rosary Cathedral
- 0.50978°N 25.1863°E
- Location: Kisangani
- Country: Democratic Republic of the Congo
- Denomination: Roman Catholic Church

Administration
- Archdiocese: Roman Catholic Archdiocese of Kisangani

The Our Lady of the Rosary Cathedral (French: Cathédrale Notre-Dame du Rosaire) is a religious building belonging to the Catholic Church and is located in the town of Kisangani (formerly Stanleyville) in the province of Tshopo (formerly Eastern Province) in the African country of the Democratic Republic of Congo.

== History ==
Its history dates back to 1899. It has been restored several times. The last three battles between the armies of Rwanda and Uganda for control of a port on the Congo caused damage to the building.

The cathedral follows the Roman or Latin rite and stands out is the headquarters of the Metropolitan Archdiocese of Kisangani (Archidioecesis Kisanganiensis or Archidiocèse de Kisangani) that was created by Pope John XXIII by bula Cum parvulum.

Pope John Paul II visited the cathedral in May 1980. It is under the pastoral responsibility of Archbishop Marcel Utembi Tapa.

== See also ==
- Roman Catholicism in the Democratic Republic of the Congo
- Our Lady of the Rosary Cathedral (California)
