= Julien Andavo Mbia =

Congolese catholic priest (1950–2024)

His Excellency Julien Andavo Mbia
- Bishop of Isiro-Niangara
- Metropolis: Kisangani
- Diocese: Isiro–Niangara
- Appointed: 1 February 2003
- Term ended: 14 July 2024
- Predecessor: Charles Kambale Mbogha
- Successor: Vacant

Orders
- Ordination: 26 August 1979
- Consecration: 19 March 2003 by Frédéric Etsou-Nzabi-Bamungwabi

Personal details
- Born: Julien Andavo Bule Ahuba Mbia; 5 September 1950 Faradje, Belgian Congo
- Died: 14 July 2024 (aged 73) Durba, DRC

Julien Andavo Mbia (5 September 1950 – 14 July 2024) was a Congolese Roman Catholic prelate. He was bishop of Isiro–Niangara from 2003 until his death. Mbia died on 14 July 2024 in Durba, Haut-Uélé, at the age of 73.

Catholic Church titles
| Preceded by Charles Kambale Mbogha | Bishop of Isiro–Niangara; 2003–2024 | Succeeded by Vacant |
