= Diocese of Isangi =

Roman Catholic diocese in the Democratic Republic of the Congo

Coordinates: 0.7788°N 24.2706°E

Diocese of Isangi Dioecesis Isangiensis

Location
- Country: Democratic Republic of the Congo
- Metropolitan: Kisangani

Statistics
- Area: 50,000 km^{2} (19,000 sq mi)
- Population: Total; Catholics: (as of 2013); 836,000; 116,000 (13.9%)

Information
- Denomination: Catholic Church
- Rite: Latin Rite

Current leadership
- Pope: Leo XIV
- Apostolic Administrator: Dieudonné Madrapile Tanzi

The Roman Catholic Diocese of Isangi (Latin: Isangien(sis)) is a Latin suffragan diocese in the ecclesiastical province of Kisangani in the Democratic Republic of the Congo.

Its cathedral episcopal see is the Cathédrale Marie Médiatrice (Mary Mediatrix) located in the city of Isangi.

== History ==
- 14 June 1951: Established as Apostolic Prefecture of Isangi on territories split off from the then Apostolic Vicariate of Basankusu, Apostolic Vicariate of Coquilhatville, Apostolic Vicariate of Lisala and Apostolic Vicariate of Stanleyville
- 2 July 1962: Promoted as Diocese of Isangi

== Bishops ==
=== Ordinaries, in reverse chronological order ===
- Bishops of Isangi (Latin Rite), below
  - Bishop Dieudonné Madrapile Tanzi (2 April 2016 – 23 September 2024)
  - Bishop Camille Lembi Zaneli (2 June 2000 – 8 July 2011)
  - Bishop Louis Mbwôl-Mpasi, O.M.I. (1 September 1988 – 20 May 1997), appointed Bishop of Idiofa
  - Bishop Lodewijk Antoon Jansen, S.M.M. (2 July 1962 – 20 April 1988); see below
- Prefect Apostolic of Isangi (Latin Rite), below
  - Father Lodewijk Antoon Jansen, S.M.M. (10 January 1952 – 2 July 1962); see above

=== Auxiliary bishop ===
- Louis Mbwôl-Mpasi, O.M.I. (1984–1988), appointed Bishop here

== See also ==
- Roman Catholicism in the Democratic Republic of the Congo

== Sources and external links ==
- GCatholic.org
- Catholic Hierarchy
