= Diocese of Isiro–Niangara =

Roman Catholic diocese in the Democratic Republic of the Congo

Coordinates: 2.7851°N 27.6111°E

Diocese of Isiro–Niangara Dioecesis Isirensis-Niangaraensis

Location
- Country: Democratic Republic of the Congo
- Metropolitan: Kisangani

Statistics
- Area: 60,000 km^{2} (23,000 sq mi)
- Population: Total; Catholics: (as of 2006); 1,475,128; 1,038,778 (70.4%)

Information
- Denomination: Catholic Church
- Rite: Latin Rite

Current leadership
- Pope: Leo XIV
- Bishop: Dieudonné Madrapile Tanzi
- Metropolitan Archbishop: Marcel Utembi Tapa

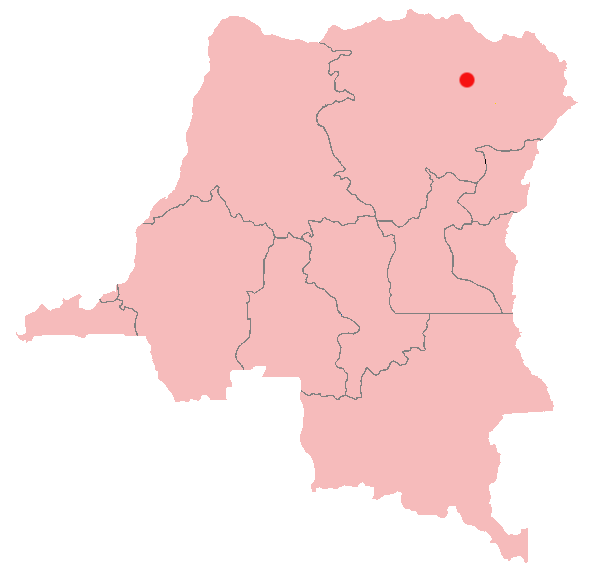
Map showing the position of Isiro

The Roman Catholic Diocese of Isiro–Niangara (Latin: Isiren(sis) – Niangaraën(sis)) is a diocese located in the cities of Isiro–Niangara in the ecclesiastical province of Kisangani in the Democratic Republic of the Congo.

== History ==
- 18 December 1911: Established as Apostolic Prefecture of Eastern Uélé from the Apostolic Prefecture of Uélé
- 6 May 1924: Promoted as Apostolic Vicariate of Eastern Uélé
- 14 December 1926: Renamed as Apostolic Vicariate of Niangara
- 10 November 1959: Promoted as Diocese of Niangara
- 23 March 1970: Renamed as Diocese of Isiro – Niangara

== Bishops ==
=== Ordinaries, in reverse chronological order ===
- Bishops of Isiro–Niangara (Latin Rite), below
  - Bishop Dieudonné Madrapile Tanzi (since 23 September 2024)
  - Bishop Julien Andavo Mbia (1 February 2003 – 16 July 2024)
  - Bishop Charles Kambale Mbogha, A.A. (6 December 1995 – 13 March 2001), appointed Archbishop of Bukavu
  - Bishop Emile Aiti Waro Leru’a (25 September 1989 – 24 March 1994)
  - Bishop Ambroise Uma Arakayo Amabe (19 February 1976 – 1 April 1989)
  - Bishop François Oddo de Wilde, O.P. (23 March 1970 – 19 February 1976); see below
- Bishop of Niangara (Latin Rite), below
  - Bishop François Oddo de Wilde, O.P. (10 November 1959 – 23 March 1970); see above & below
- Vicars Apostolic of Niangara (Roman rite), below
  - Bishop François Oddo de Wilde, O.P. (11 March 1948 – 10 November 1959); see above
  - Bishop Robert Costanzo Lagae, O.P. (18 December 1924 – February 1948)
- Prefects Apostolic of Eastern Uélé (Latin Rite), below
  - Fr. Emilio Rolin, O.P. (1922 – 1924)
  - Fr. Reginaldo van Schoote, O.P. (16 January 1912 – 28 April 1922)

=== Coadjutor bishop ===
- Ambroise Uma Arakayo Amabe (1972-1976)

== See also ==
- Roman Catholicism in the Democratic Republic of the Congo

== Sources ==
- GCatholic.org
- Catholic Hierarchy
