= Basankusu =

- Commune
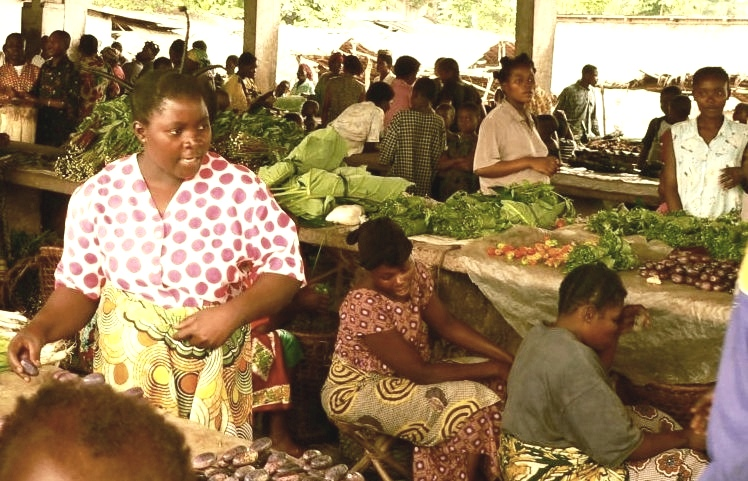
- Basankusu Market
- Nickname: Basa
- Location in Democratic Republic of the Congo
- Coordinates: 1°13′20″N 19°48′10″E
- Country: DR Congo
- Province: Équateur
- Territory: Basankusu
- Elevation: 1,217 ft (371 m)

Population (2004)
  - Total: 23,764
  - Languages: Lomongo Lingala French
- Time zone: UTC+1 (West Africa Time)
- Climate: Af

Basankusu is a town in Équateur Province, Democratic Republic of the Congo. It is the main town and administrative centre of the Basankusu Territory. In 2004, it had an estimated population of 23,764. It has a gravel airstrip, covered and open markets, a hospital, and three cellphone networks, the first of which was installed in 2006. The town is also known as a centre for bonobo conservation efforts. Despite such developments, most inhabitants live at a subsistence level: hunting, fishing, keeping chickens and keeping a vegetable plot. In 2010, the workers at the local palm plantation would earn an average monthly salary of $40 (US dollars), most others would have much less.

The location of the town on the Lulonga River, a tributary of the Congo, at the confluence of the Lopori and Maringa Rivers has contributed to its success as a centre for trade in the region. Set deep in tropical rainforest, the rivers serve as the highways for transport of people as well as goods.

Historically, Basankusu holds some stories of exploitation during the times of the Abir Congo Company but was also the gateway to much of Equateur Province for those individuals involved in the reforms which came from the Casement Report and the Berlin Conference of 1884-85.

== History ==
=== Origin of the name ===
The name Basankusu is said to have been misunderstood by its European explorers and colonisers, who lacked knowledge of the local language. The Mongo group that founded Basankusu were the Okutsu; their descendants were called the Basaa Okutsu, meaning the "children of the Okutsu". This name was contracted slightly into the name Basaa'kutsu.

Another account of the etymology of Basankusu is that it comes from basa ba nkoso, meaning "quarrelling parrots", or possibly Baasa bankoso, "small parrots".

=== Abir Congo Company ===
See also Maringa-Lopori-Wamba Landscape and Abir Congo Company.

Basankusu was the first trading post of the Abir Congo Company (ABIR) along the Congo River from Kinshasa (then known as Leopoldville), the capital of the Congo. Later known as the Compagnie du Congo Belge, the Abir Congo Company harvested natural rubber in the 19th and early 20th century. It was granted a large concession with the rights to tax the inhabitants, taken in the form of rubber. The collection system revolved around a series of trading posts along the two main rivers in the concession – the Lopori and the Maringa. Each post was commanded by a European agent and guarded with armed sentries to enforce taxation and punish any rebels.

ABIR would sell a kilogram of rubber in Europe for up to 10 francs (fr), which cost them only 1.35 fr to collect and transport. However, this came at a cost to the human rights of those who could not pay the tax, with imprisonment, flogging, and other corporal punishments recorded.

The Casement Report comprises a multitude of individual statements gathered by the British Consul, Roger Casement, including several detailing the grim tales of killings, mutilation, kidnapping, and cruel beatings of the native population by soldiers of the Congo administration of King Leopold. The British Parliament demanded a second meeting of the 14 signatory powers of the 1885 Berlin Conference, at which time the Belgian Parliament forced a reluctant Leopold to set up an independent commission of enquiry. This led to the arrest and punishment of several officials who had been responsible for murders during a rubber-collection expedition in 1903. The reforms that followed the Casement Report, including those that concerned ABIR at Basankusu, set the foundation for the colonial Belgian state of Congo.

== Cathedral ==
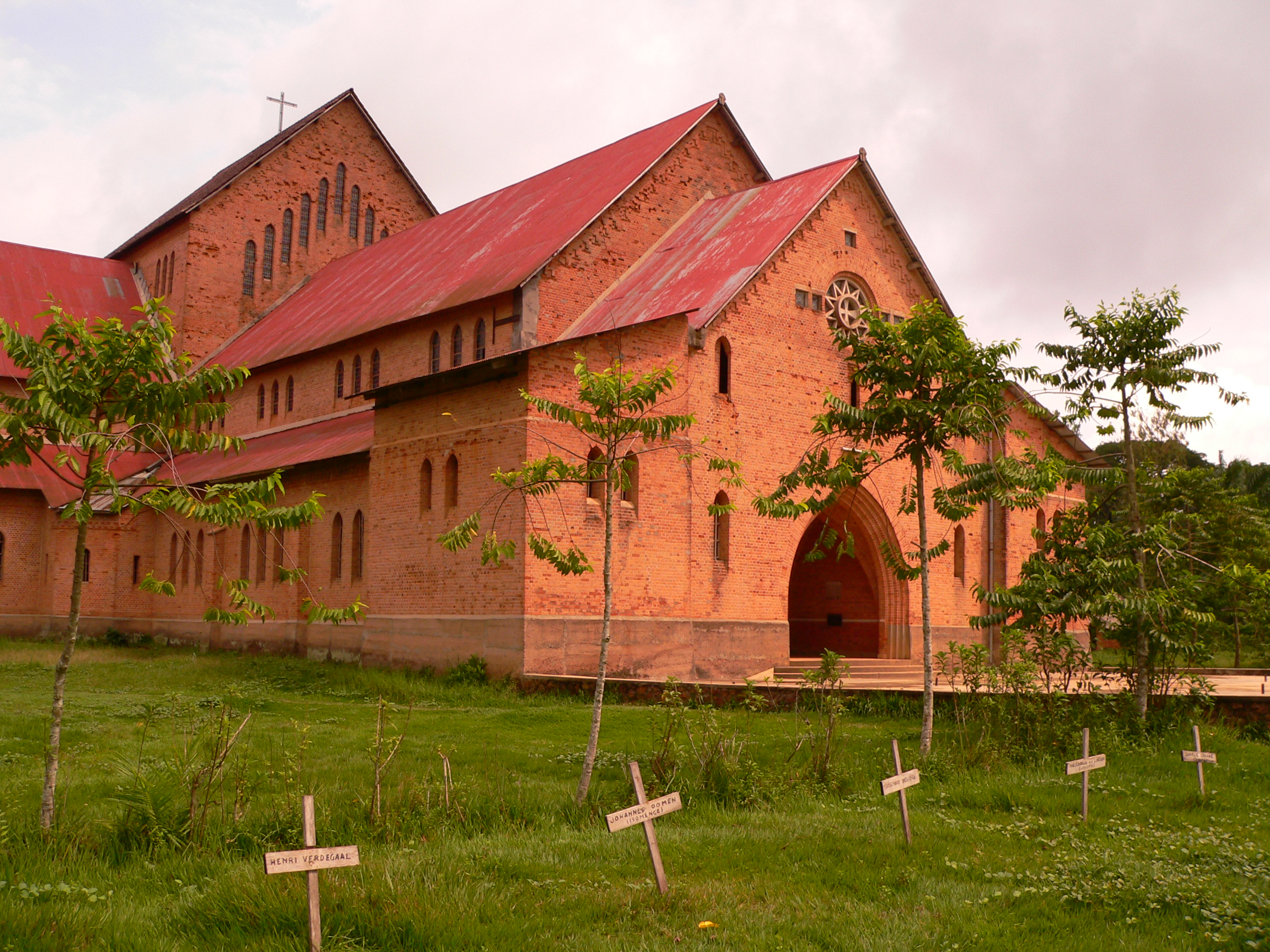
Basankusu Cathedral before its demolition in 2012.

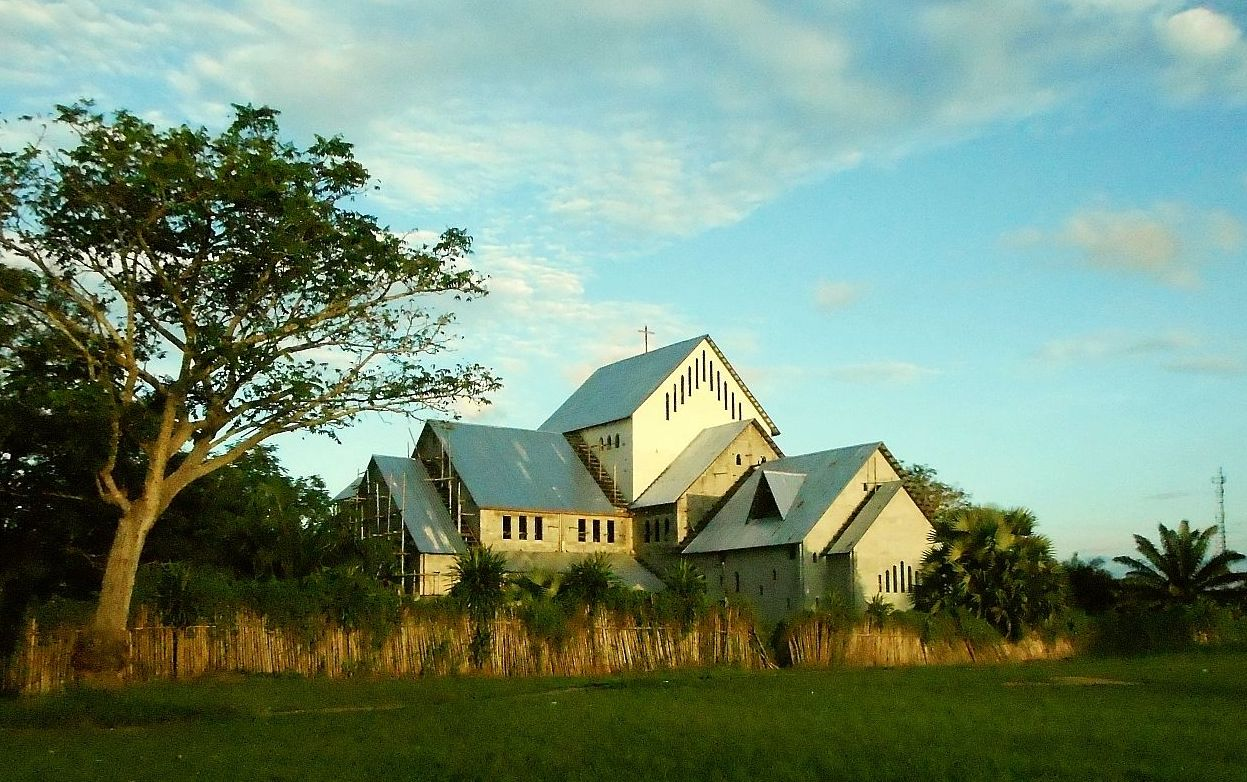
The new cathedral of SS. Peter and Paul, Basankusu - inaugurated Oct 23 2018

The original Roman Catholic cathedral of Saints Peter and Paul, built by Jan de Koning, a brother in the Mill Hill Missionaries society, during World War II, was demolished in 2012; it was rebuilt with a very similar design. The new building used computer design technology, and used reinforced concrete in place of kiln-fired brick. It remains the tallest building in Basankusu. The Mill Hill Missionaries, and later with some support from the Congregatio Immaculati Cordis Mariae missionaries, supported the establishment of the Diocese of Basankusu, which has its episcopal seat at the cathedral.

On Sunday, October 21, 2018, ten bishops and a hundred priests concelebrated Mass at which Bishop Joseph Mokobe, Bishop of Basankusu, presided, for the inauguration of the newly rebuilt cathedral.

== Geography ==
Basankusu is situated on the Lulonga River, a tributary of the Congo, at the confluence of the Lopori and Maringa Rivers. This location facilitates the transport of local goods to and from the cities of Mbandaka and Kinshasa.

Because Basankusu is the last port of substance on the river of the Lopori Basin, conservation efforts for the bonobo, use the town as a base.

Being slightly more than 1° north of the Equator, Basankusu has a tropical rainforest climate. There is no real dry season, with monthly rainfall in the town ranging between averages of 69 mm and 213 mm, with most months at the higher end of that range. Average high temperatures over a year are between 30 °C and 33 °C, although throughout the day a high of 37 °C is not uncommon. Evening lows average around 20 °C.

Being close to a major river and enduring frequent, heavy tropical rainfall, Basankusu is prone to the damaging effects of water. In July, 2010, the town was affected by flooding, with 1,400 people made homeless. Roads, which are all non-metalled, and bridges were also affected. Such frequent harsh weather conditions have an effect on the quality of life for local people. Waterborne diseases can become more prevalent, and the transport of goods, such as food, medicine, and trade goods, becomes more difficult.

=== Climate ===
Climate data for Basankusu, elevation 353 m (1,158 ft), (1971–2000)
Month	Jan	Feb	Mar	Apr	May	Jun	Jul	Aug	Sep	Oct	Nov	Dec	Year
Mean daily maximum °C (°F)	31.0 (87.8)	31.7 (89.1)	31.5 (88.7)	31.3 (88.3)	31.2 (88.2)	30.1 (86.2)	29.1 (84.4)	29.3 (84.7)	30.0 (86.0)	29.9 (85.8)	30.1 (86.2)	30.6 (87.1)	30.5 (86.9)
Mean daily minimum °C (°F)	19.6 (67.3)	19.9 (67.8)	20.4 (68.7)	20.7 (69.3)	20.8 (69.4)	20.4 (68.7)	20.0 (68.0)	20.0 (68.0)	20.0 (68.0)	20.0 (68.0)	19.9 (67.8)	20.0 (68.0)	20.1 (68.3)
Average precipitation mm (inches)	69.0 (2.72)	128.0 (5.04)	178.0 (7.01)	179.0 (7.05)	173.0 (6.81)	167.0 (6.57)	147.0 (5.79)	204.0 (8.03)	211.0 (8.31)	203.0 (7.99)	213.0 (8.39)	123.0 (4.84)	1,995 (78.55)
Average relative humidity (%)	84	83	84	86	86	88	88	88	87	87	87	86	86
Source: FAO

== Commerce ==
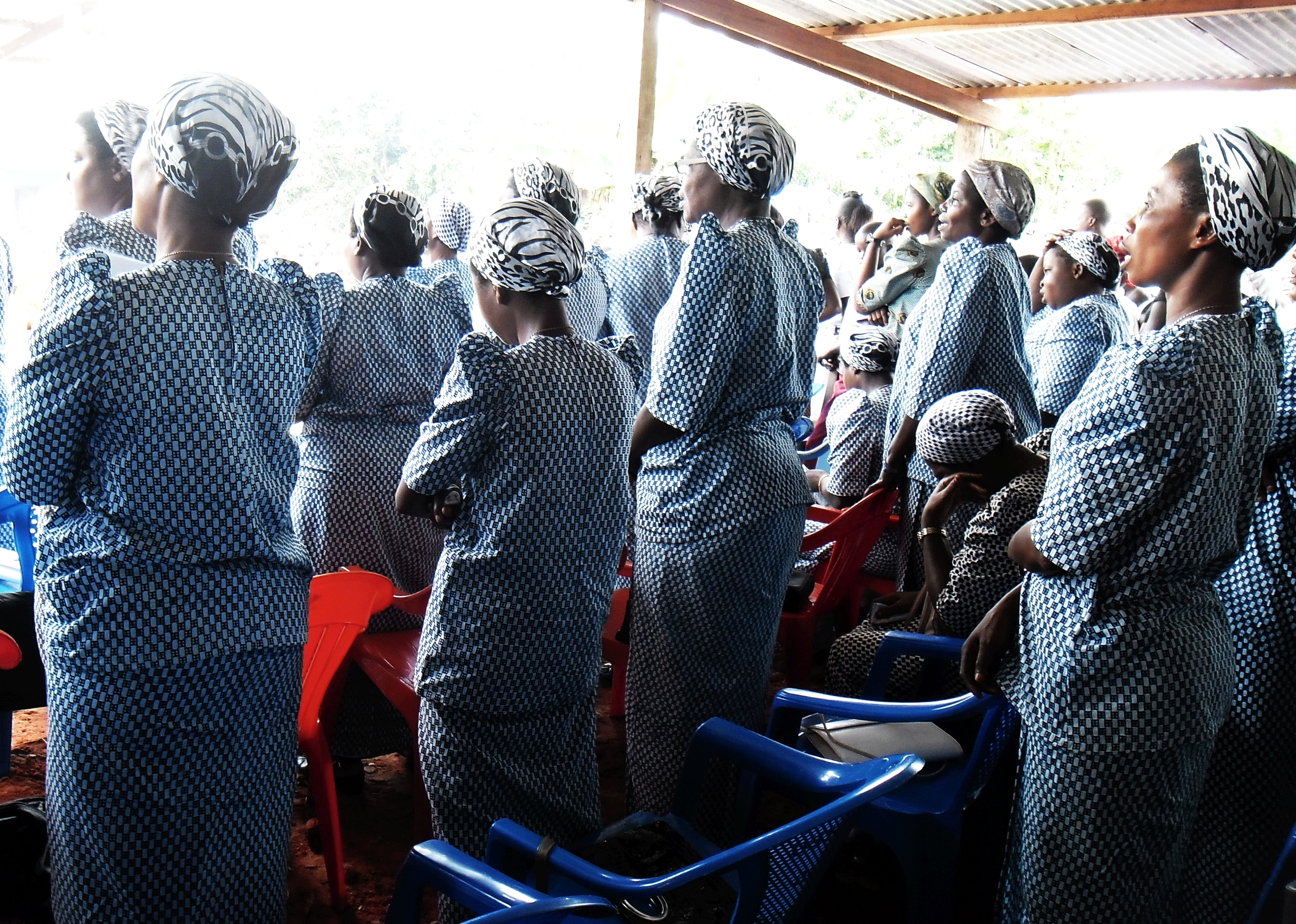
The Catholic religious order, the Theresienne Sisters of Basankusu at a mass for the taking and retaking of vows at the temporary structure built while the new cathedral was being built, 2013.

Basankusu is a centre for palm oil production and treatment. One company, Compagnie de Commerce et des Plantations (CCP), produces palm oil from plantations of African oil palms at nearby villages Lisafa and Ndeke. The factory at Lisafa is responsible for the treatment of the palm oil and production of soap. The plantation areas are as follows: 3,488 hectares (ha) of oil palms, and 372 ha given over to coffee. It is a major local employer, with almost 4,000 workers on its payroll. Although CCP is one of the successful businesses in the area, it is in dispute with village chiefs regarding land acquisition. In 2010, a worker would earn an average monthly salary of $40 (US dollars), depending on output.

The frustration of local producers was brought to the attention of the press by Mlle Jeanne-Marie Abanda, Director of Caritas Basankusu, when she explained their difficulties in December 2009:

We have had a bumper harvest this year and have managed to send 30% of our maize that was stored at the Port of Basankusu. Transporting agricultural goods from the outlying villages is one of our problems, distributing it to the major centres of population throughout the country is the other.

The same information is reported by the Congolese Control Office (Office Congolais de Controle).

Jef Dupain, who worked as an African Wildlife Foundation (AWF) primatologist at that time, and had spent more than a decade in the Congo working with bonobos, also stated the devastating impact a lack of transport for trade has on conservation: "You can't just tell the local people not to eat bushmeat. You're not taken seriously." Because of this, an AWF-funded cargo barge, the Ferbo I, was brought in to travel up and down the Congo and Maringa Rivers to collect agricultural products from local farmers. This worked well in aiding local people to evacuate their products. Unfortunately, the project ended when the authorities seized the boat to transport troops, in 2005.

== Communication and transportation ==
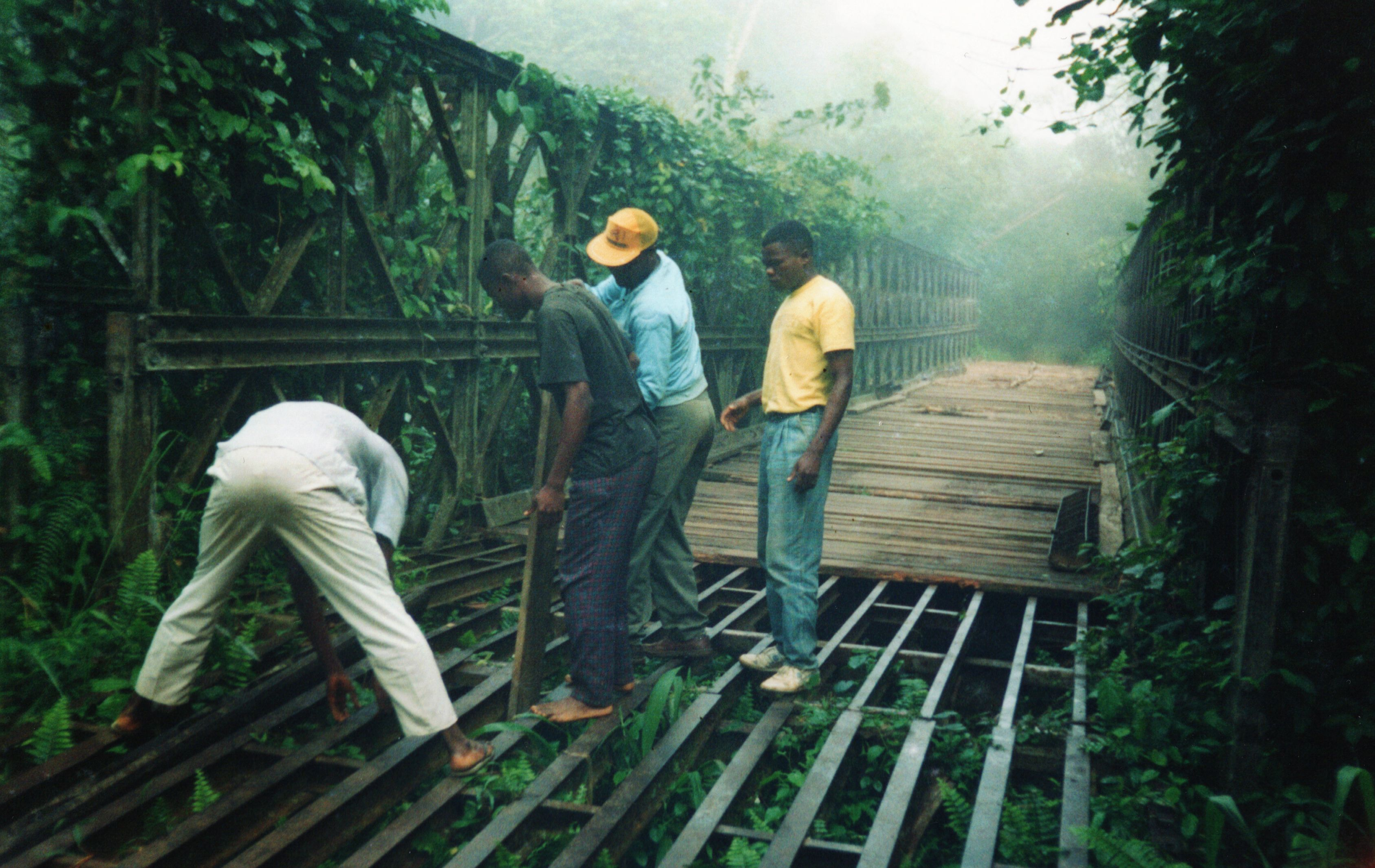
Arranging planks of wood to enable passage of this decaying Bailey bridge.

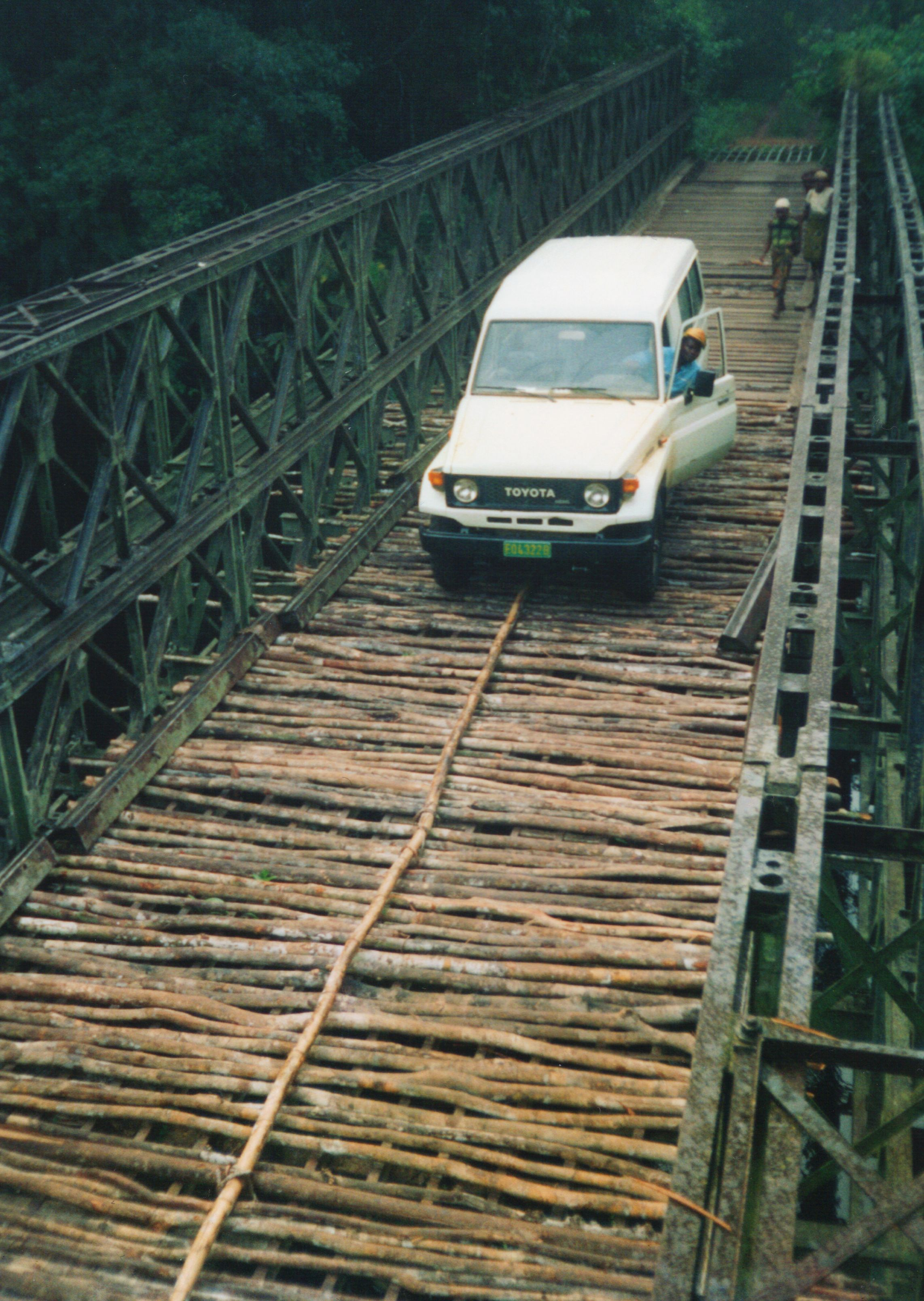
The deterioration of essential bridges around Basankusu makes communication difficult.

The isolated situation of the town makes communication with the wider world challenging. During the military conflict of 1998–2003, Basankusu was in rebel (Movement for the Liberation of Congo, MLC) hands and cut off from trade and relief from the rest of the world.

The roads within Basankusu are non-metalled and prone to erosion from the frequent, torrential downpours. Roads to other towns and villages are also non-metalled; their condition has continued to decline since the country's independence from Belgium in 1960. The metal Bailey bridges, which span ravines and streams along the roads, are also in very poor condition and in danger of collapse in some cases. Motor vehicles are rare and are usually only owned by businesses, hospitals, Christian missions, and government organisations.

The rivers provide the most obvious means of transporting goods and people. A 700-kilometre boat journey from Basankusu to the capital, Kinshasa, can take several weeks. Major barge operators are Transports Fluvial et Commerce de l'Equateur (TFCE) and Office National des Transports (ONATRA). Passengers often travel in cramped conditions, in some cases travelling atop the logs being pushed along the river by the barges. They are victim to high prices for food and other essentials along the way. The frequent breakdown of these river boats puts passengers in a precarious position regarding daily sustenance; a delay of several days can oblige passengers to sell all their belongings so that they can buy a meal. The poor communication within the country, generally, means that passengers cannot be helped by friends or family.

There is an airport, consisting of a 1,480-metre gravelled airstrip and a small building where passengers can wait. One 28-seater passenger plane to and from Kinshasa lands at Basankusu Airport each week, and an occasional 16-seat capacity plane associated with the palm oil plantation. Several cargo planes also land here. The cost of a flight, however, is beyond the means of most private individuals; passengers tend to be people working for NGOs or businesses in Kinshasa.

There is no postal service in Basankusu. To send letters, the custom is to give them to someone who is travelling or the pilot of a plane, who will send them from Kinshasa or Europe.

Mobile phone use started with the installation of two mobile phone masts, in 2006, each with its own generator and watchman. The advent of mobile communication has made a large difference in the lives of many people. The phone networks, one of which, Vodacom, is a subsidiary of South Africa's Vodacom Group (ultimately owned by Vodafone UK). These communication systems enable people to keep in touch with family and friends who have migrated to Kinshasa or further afield. The signal stops as you leave Basankusu.

== Local food ==
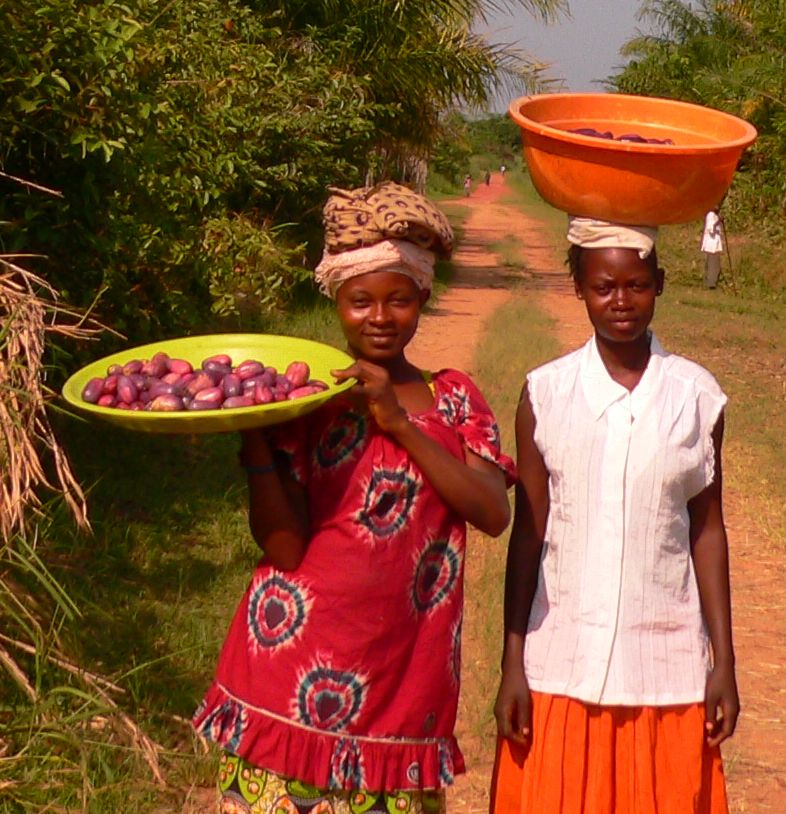
Tasty seasonal African Plums - known locally as Safu - in Basankusu.

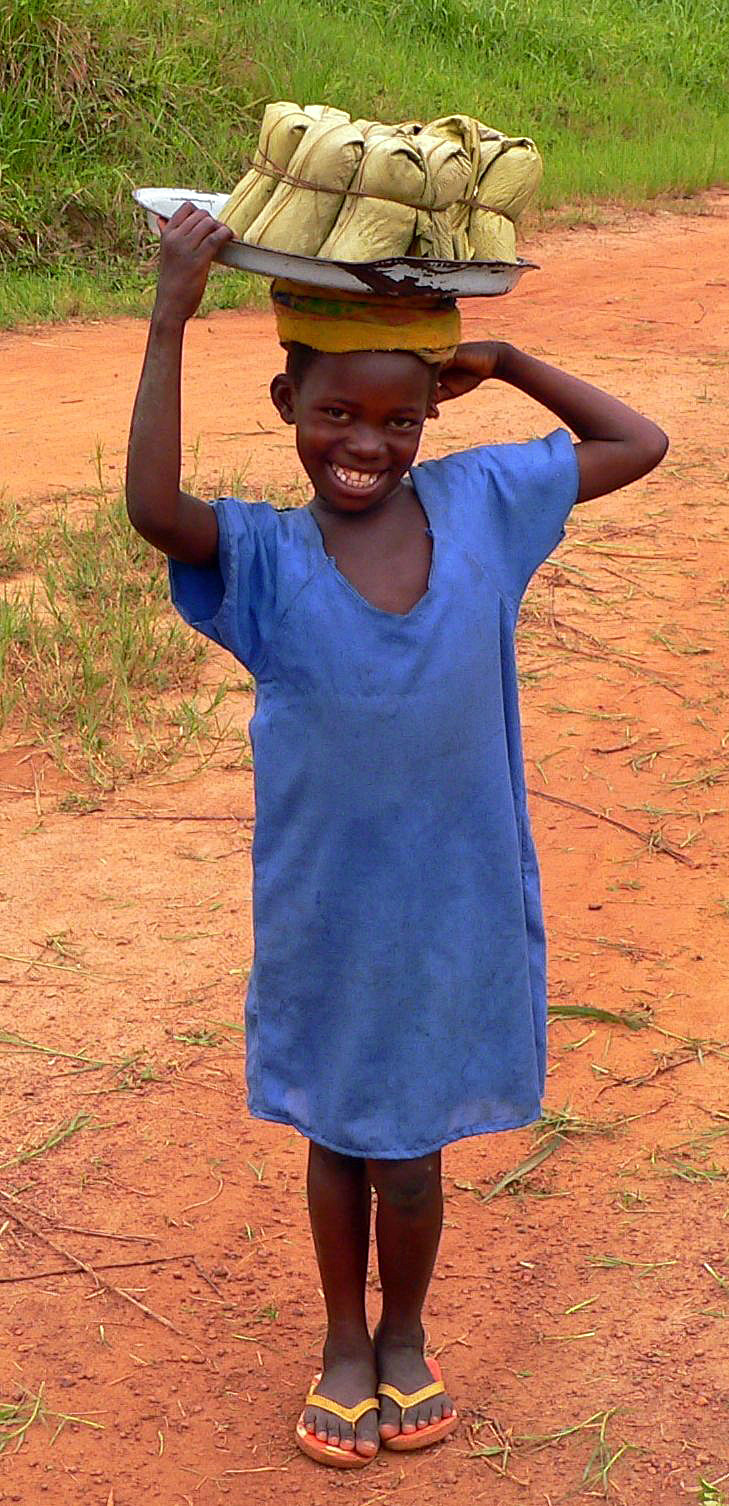
A girl delivers 'kwanga' – Cassava bread – wrapped in banana leaves. Basankusu, DRC.

Cassava (yuca), which originated in South America and the Caribbean, is the staple food in Basankusu. The roots are made into cassava bread, known as kwanga, and other cassava-based dishes. The leaves are also used as a green vegetable and are compared to spinach for taste and texture.

Moambe mwambi or mwambe (Lingala: mwǎmba), is the name given to the sauce of palm oil or peanuts. Moambe chicken is also considered a national dish. The chicken meat is coated in the rich moambe sauce and is usually accompanied by rice, cooked cassava leaves (mpondu), and chili pepper (pili-pili).

The people of Basankusu usually keep vegetable gardens away from the town itself. They are cut into the forest and fit the slash and burn model of farming. These plots of land are often only partially cleared, with house-sized termite hills and the trunks of felled trees left to supply firewood for the year's cooking. Cassava is the main crop. It can be grown for the table as well as for the market-place. Peanuts, maize, papaya, pineapples, avocados, oil palms, and other fruits and vegetables are also grown.

Maize, although sold steaming hot as a fast food in the market, is primarily produced for alcohol production. Heads of corn are cut up and boiled into a mash, which is then fermented and distilled using improvised stills made from cut oil drums. Because of the woody core of the cobs of corn, the alcohol produced contains high levels of methanol, which is toxic. It is known as lotoko or bompulo.

Palm wine, on the other hand, is made from the sap of a wild palm tree, is fermented by natural yeasts, and gives an alcohol content of between five and seven percent.

The marketplace is a place for buying and selling locally grown foods and also foodstuffs from further afield, which have come up the river from centres of import, such as Kinshasa. Bananas, palm nuts, onions, cassava, and cassava leaves are sold — as well as some seasonal extras such as the savoury African plum (safu) and caterpillars (mbinzo) (similar to the Mopane worms of Zimbabwe). Bread, produced in cottage bakeries, is available, as is locally grown and imported rice, although neither of these products is comparable to cassava in popularity.

Meat often comes from hunting. Conservation groups are concerned that, with the rise in the human population, many animal species are in danger of extinction because of the trade in bushmeat. Chimpanzee, bonobo, wild boar, monkey, antelope, and other wild animals are often sold in the market or at impromptu stalls around the town. In 1998, Jeff Dupain and others catalogued the types of bushmeat available in the two main Basankusu markets; they interviewed the stallholders to find out where the animals were hunted. Many people keep livestock around the family home. Chickens, pigs, and, less frequently, sheep and goats provide fresh food and a source of income.

The rivers provide a great variety of fish, and locals often spend several days at a time fishing from improvised fishing villages along the river.

== Languages ==
The dominant people of Basankusu are the Mongo; therefore, the Bantu language Lomongo, which carries with it many Mongo beliefs and customs through its proverbs and sayings, is spoken as a first language by most people. The lingua franca, Lingala (also a Bantu language), is spoken to cross the tribal divide – as it is in a great deal of the Democratic Republic of Congo. Because of the country's Belgian colonial heritage, French is spoken in all lessons in secondary schools and in government offices.

== Housing ==
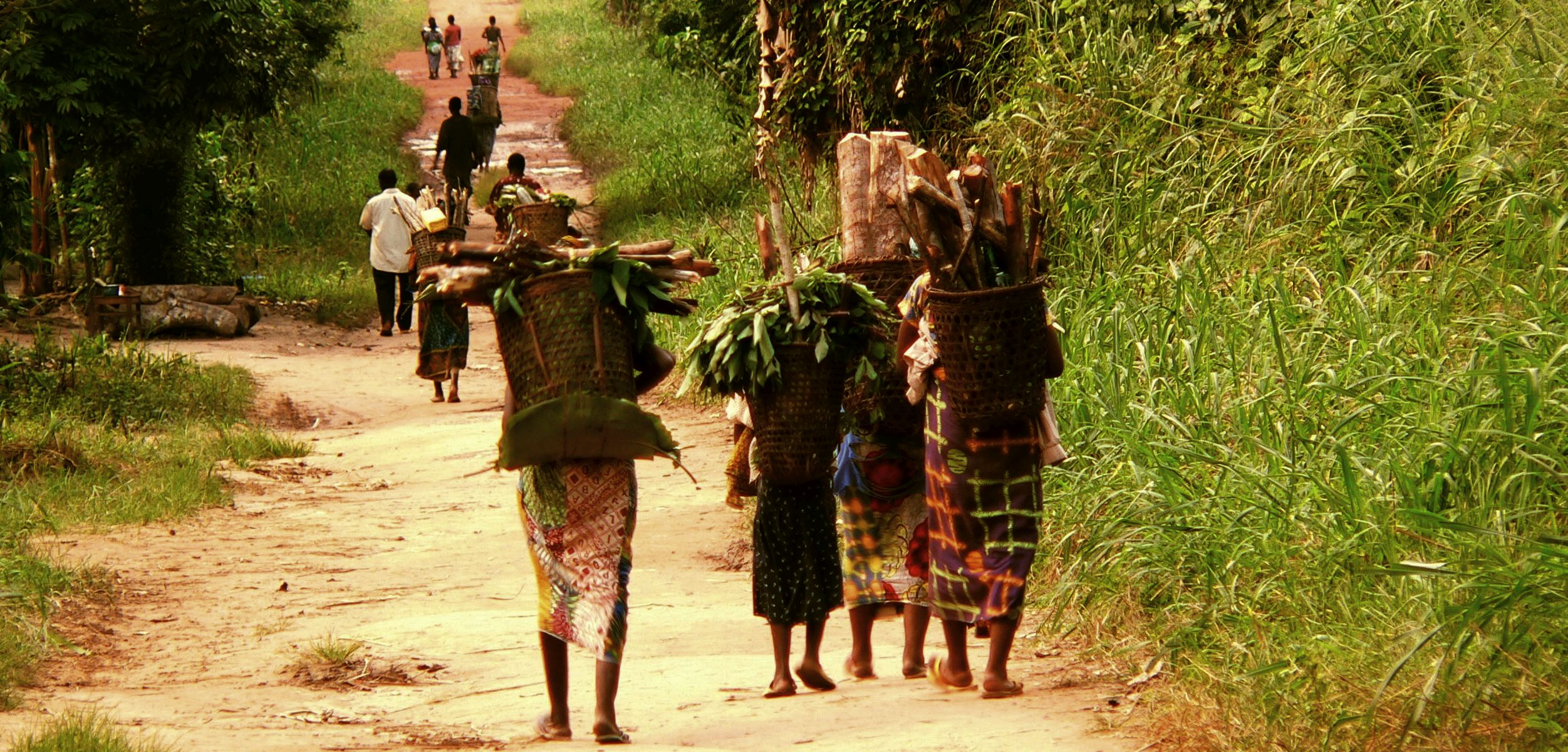
Women returning from their vegetable gardens with cassava and firewood.

Children dance at the offertory during mass at Basankusu Cathedral.

Bricks for houses are of several types. Termite hills are used to produce cement-free, cost-free, durable mud bricks in Basankusu, although fired and non-fired clay bricks are also used. Palm-thatched roofs and hard-earth floors are found in the majority of houses, but variations in construction include concrete floors and corrugated metal or fired-clay tiled roofs.

Houses tend to have an outside sitting area, because of the warm climate, and overhanging roofs to create a sheltered area from the heavy tropical rain. The kitchen is usually a separate wattle and daub structure, behind the main house. The toilet, in a town without water mains, is normally a simple cubicle concealing a pit or "long drop" dry toilet.

Basankusu is fortunate for having a good underground water supply and many houses have on-site water hand pumps. Habitat for Humanity has an established housing project here. Basankusu has grown rapidly since the recent national troubles of the two Congo Wars. Reasons for this may be the large increase in the population nationally, as well as migration from outlying villages. Migration is partly due to hardship caused by the lack of river transport and the poor access to everyday goods that has resulted.

== Basenji dogs ==
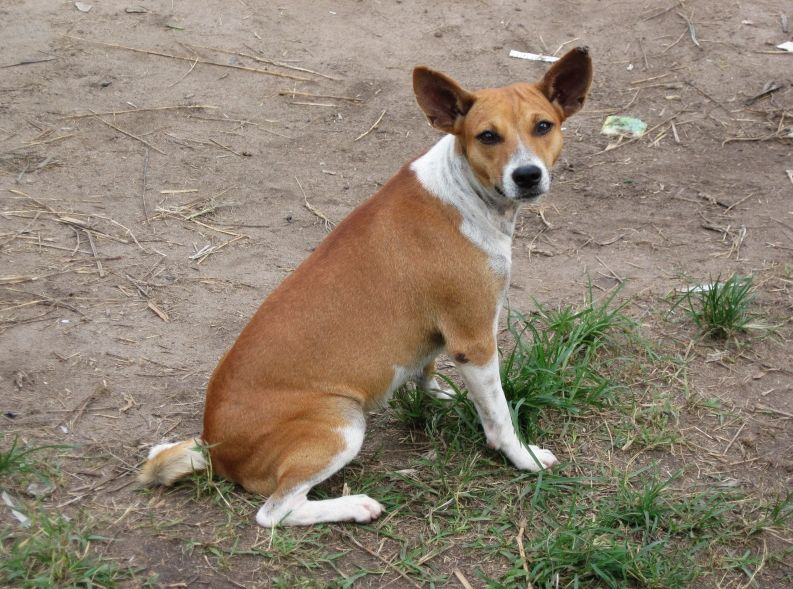
Basenji in Basankusu.

The Basenji is a breed of hunting dog that is often seen in Basankusu. They are small, elegant-looking, short-haired dogs with erect ears, a tightly curled tail, and a graceful neck. They are also known as "bush dogs" or "Congo dogs". They produce unusual howls, yodels, and other undulated vocalisations, in contrast to the characteristic bark of modern dog breeds. The sounds are sometimes called a barroo and are due to the unusually shaped larynx of the dogs. This trait also gives the Basenji the nickname "barkless dog".

Over centuries, its structure and type have been fixed by adaptation to its habitat, as well as use – primarily net hunting in extremely dense old-growth forest vegetation.

Although these hunting dogs are often mixed with European breeds in Basankusu, pure Basenjis can be found in villages further upriver. In 2010, Basankusu served as a base for an expedition to collect breeding stock for the American market.

== Quality of life indicators ==
Since the independence of the 1960s, there has been an increasing deterioration in the quality of life for people of Basankusu and the Democratic Republic of Congo generally. This decline has been especially bad because of the violent conflicts that have ravaged the country.

The results have been catastrophic nationally:

- 80% of the people survive on less than one dollar per day.
- 75% of the population live in a precarious situation regarding food.
- 54% of the population do not have access to healthcare.
- One child in five dies before the age of five years.

These numbers are not unusual for the Congo. Having been in an area of fighting during the military conflicts that took place from 1998 onwards, the population is still recovering from the resulting long-term effects. Basankusu was captured by the Movement for the Liberation of Congo (MLC) on 29 November 1999, in a takeover that happened very quickly with no civilian casualties. However, food was taken from people's vegetable gardens during this time, although reports about treatment by the armed forces were generally positive.

The health system in the Congo has eroded, not only as a result of war, but also after years of government neglect.

Prevalent illnesses include meningitis, dysentery, cholera, trypanosomiasis (sleeping sickness), and mpox. Basankusu was the first place for an occurrence of monkeypox in humans to be recorded. There have been outbreaks of whooping cough, some cases with fatal results. In June 2010 an unidentified illness killed fourteen people in the nearby village of Songo. In 2015, Francis Hannaway, a British national, opened a therapeutic feeding centre in Basankusu, together with a team of 12 local volunteers. As of April 2020, the centre has treated over 4,000 malnourished children.

== Conservation ==
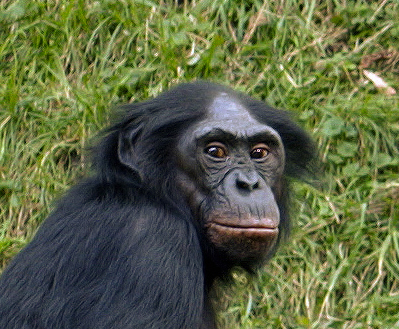
Bonobo (Pan paniscus) is the closest living relative to humans.

See also Maringa-Lopori-Wamba Landscape.

Basankusu is an important staging post for conservation projects, for example, those relating to the bonobo. The town falls within the western limits of what has become known as the Maringa-Lopori-Wamba Landscape, a proposed conservation area in the basin of the Maringa and Lopori rivers that includes the Luo Scientific Reserve around the village of Wamba. The landscape consists of dense forest to the east of Basankusu and north of the village of Baringa.

Project stakeholders include the Max Planck Institute, African Wildlife Foundation, Source de Lomako (SoLo), Pygmy Chimpanzee Protection Fund, Bonobo Conservation Initiative, and Milwaukee Zoological Society.

Over 400 species of birds can be found in the conservation area. In certain places, the density of Congo peafowl (Afropavo congensis) – a species endemic to the centre and northeast of the Congolese forests, with feathers of deep blue with a metallic green and violet tinge – is probably the highest in the country.

At least eleven species of diurnal primates have been observed in the Maringa-Lopori-Wamba Landscape. The Dryas monkey (Cercopithecus dryas) is endemic to the basins of the Maringa and the Lopori, and only two examples of the species are known. The bonobo (Pan paniscus), Thollon's red colobus (Procolobus tholloni), the golden-bellied mangabey (Cercocebus chrysogaster), and the black mangabey (Lophocebus aterrimus) are found here. Allen's swamp monkey (Allenopithecus nigroviridis) is endemic to the flooded or floodplain forests of the Central Basin, and the Angolan colobus (Colobus angolensis) is known only in the Central Basin, the northeast of the Congo, and the Africa Great Lakes region.

Other large mammals include the elephant (Loxodonta africana), the buffalo (Syncerus caffer), the bongo (Tragelaphus euryceros) – which is an antelope characterised by a striking reddish-brown coat, white-yellow stripes, and long, slightly spiralled horns – the African golden cat (Profelis aurata), and the leopard (Panthera pardus).

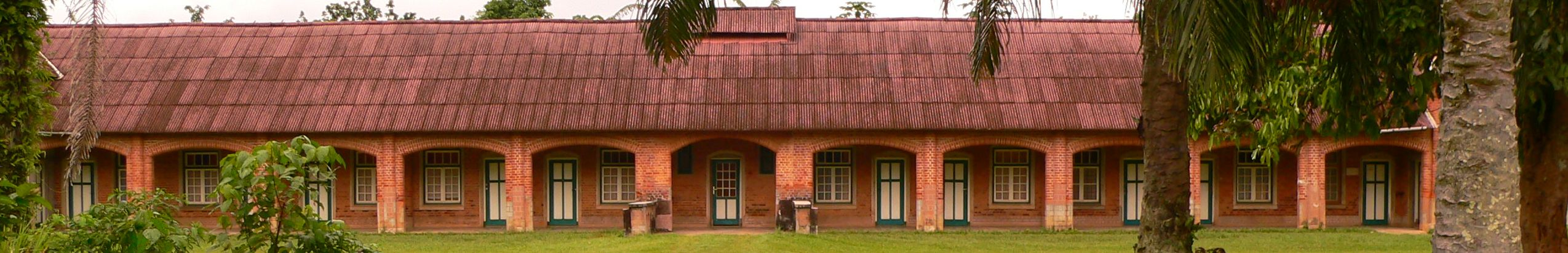
Mpoma provides a place to stay for those involved in the work of the Catholic Diocese of Basankusu when they have business in town.

== Images ==
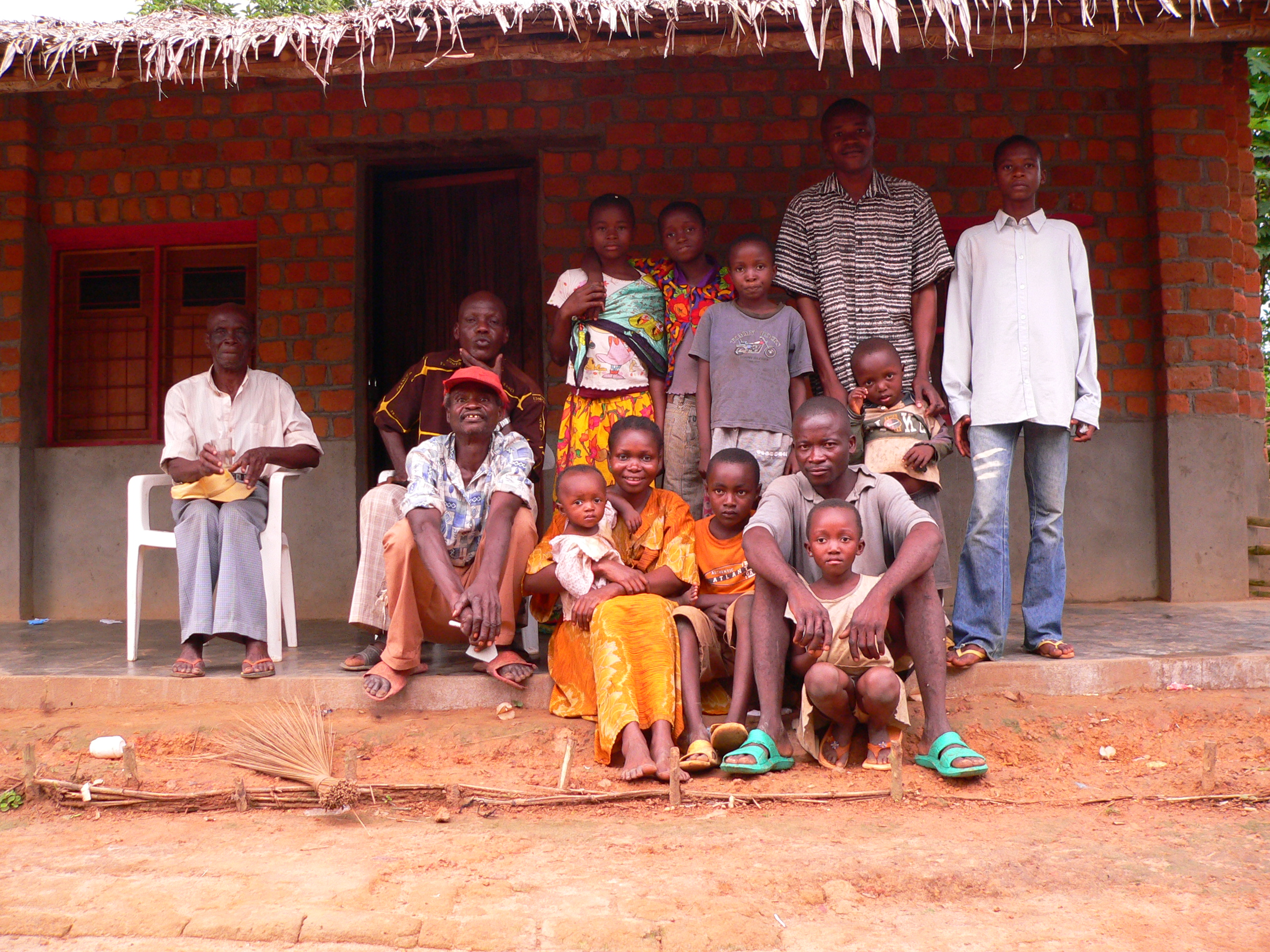
Basankusu - a family in front of a fired-brick house with palm-leaf roof and concrete floor.

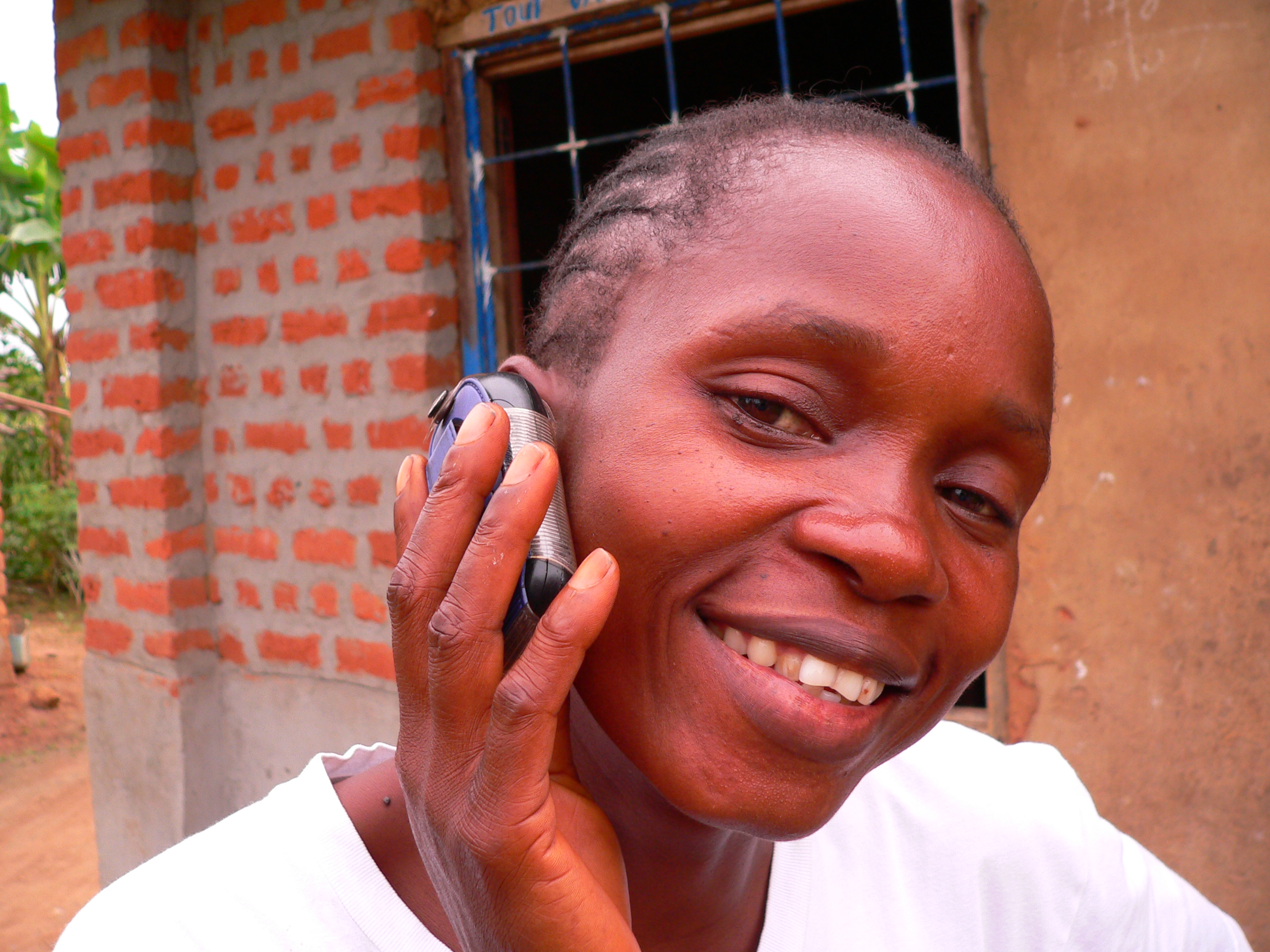
A Basankusu woman celebrates being connected to the outside world by mobile phone with a phone call to relatives in Kinshasa.

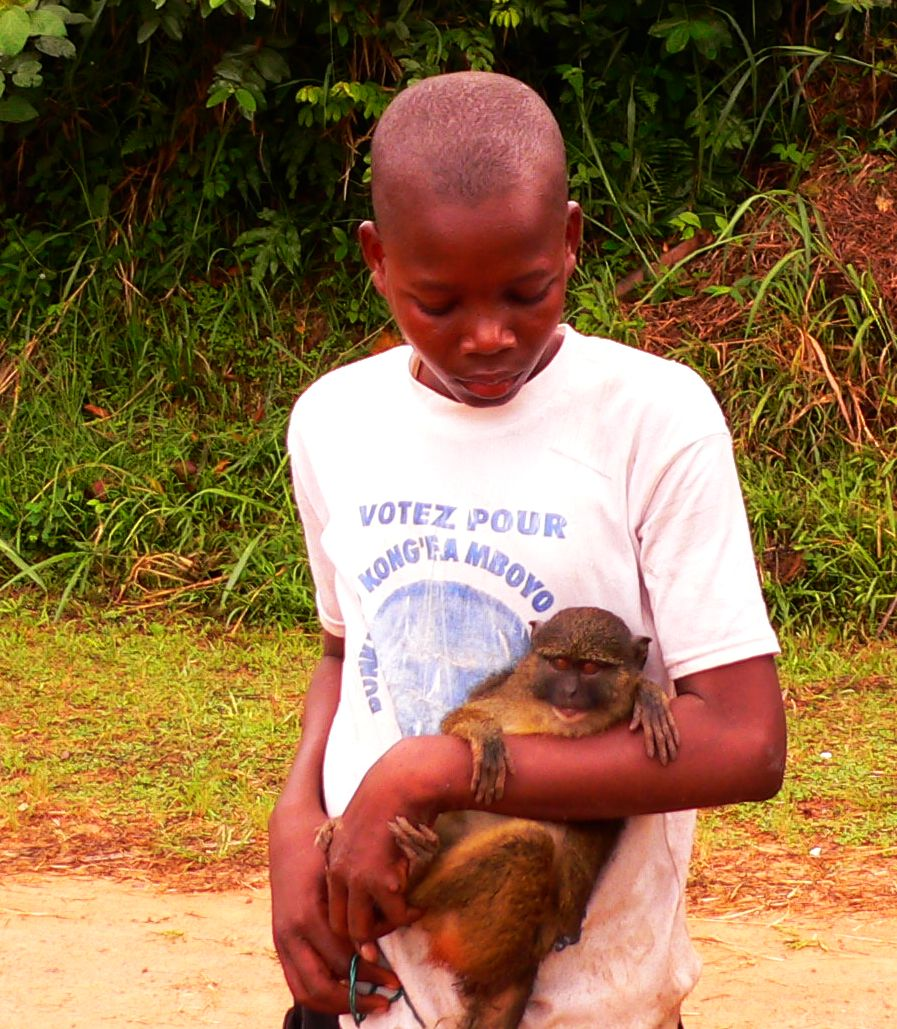
Allen's swamp monkey - Basankusu.

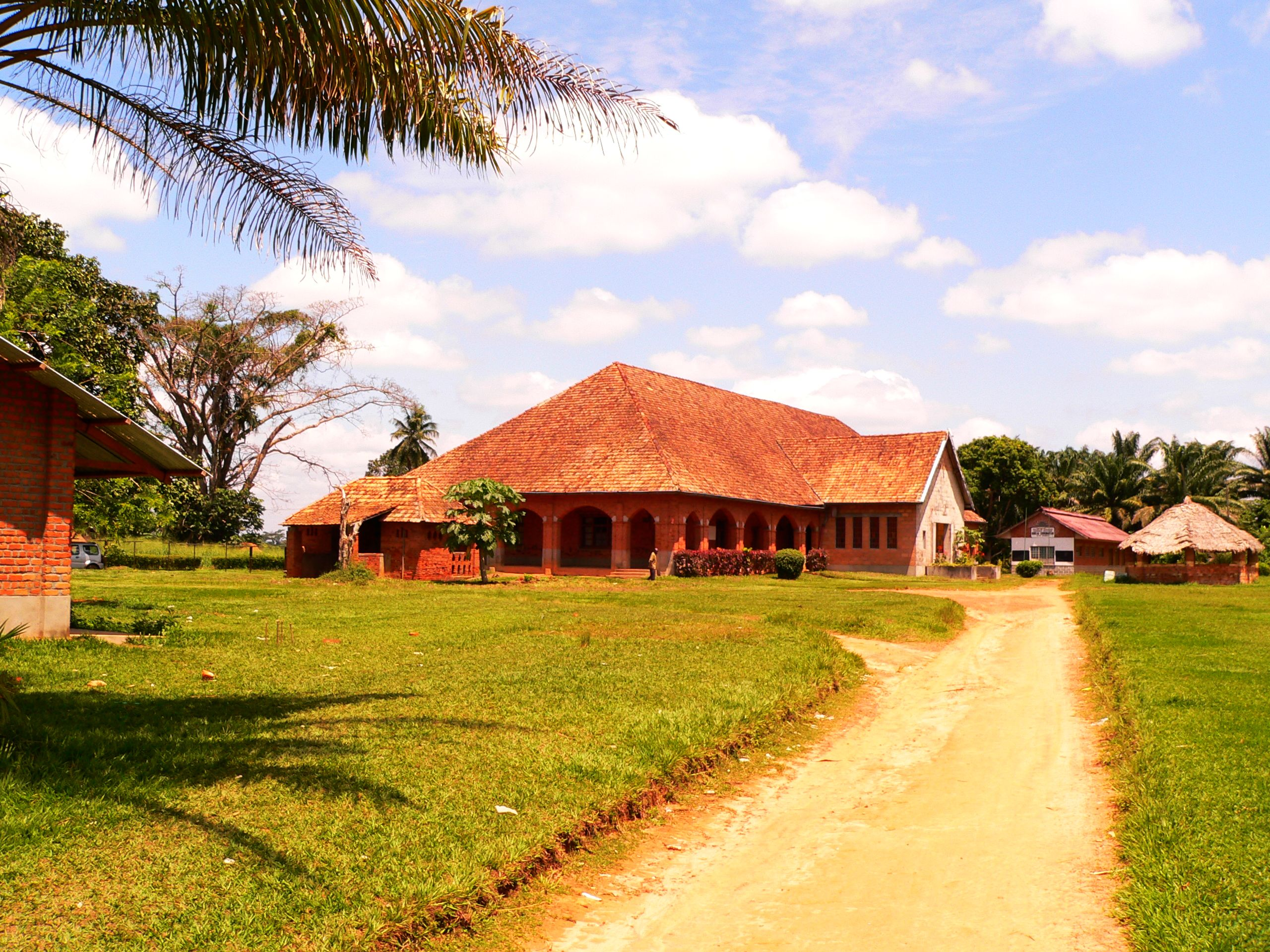
Diocese of Basankusu - 'Mpoma'.

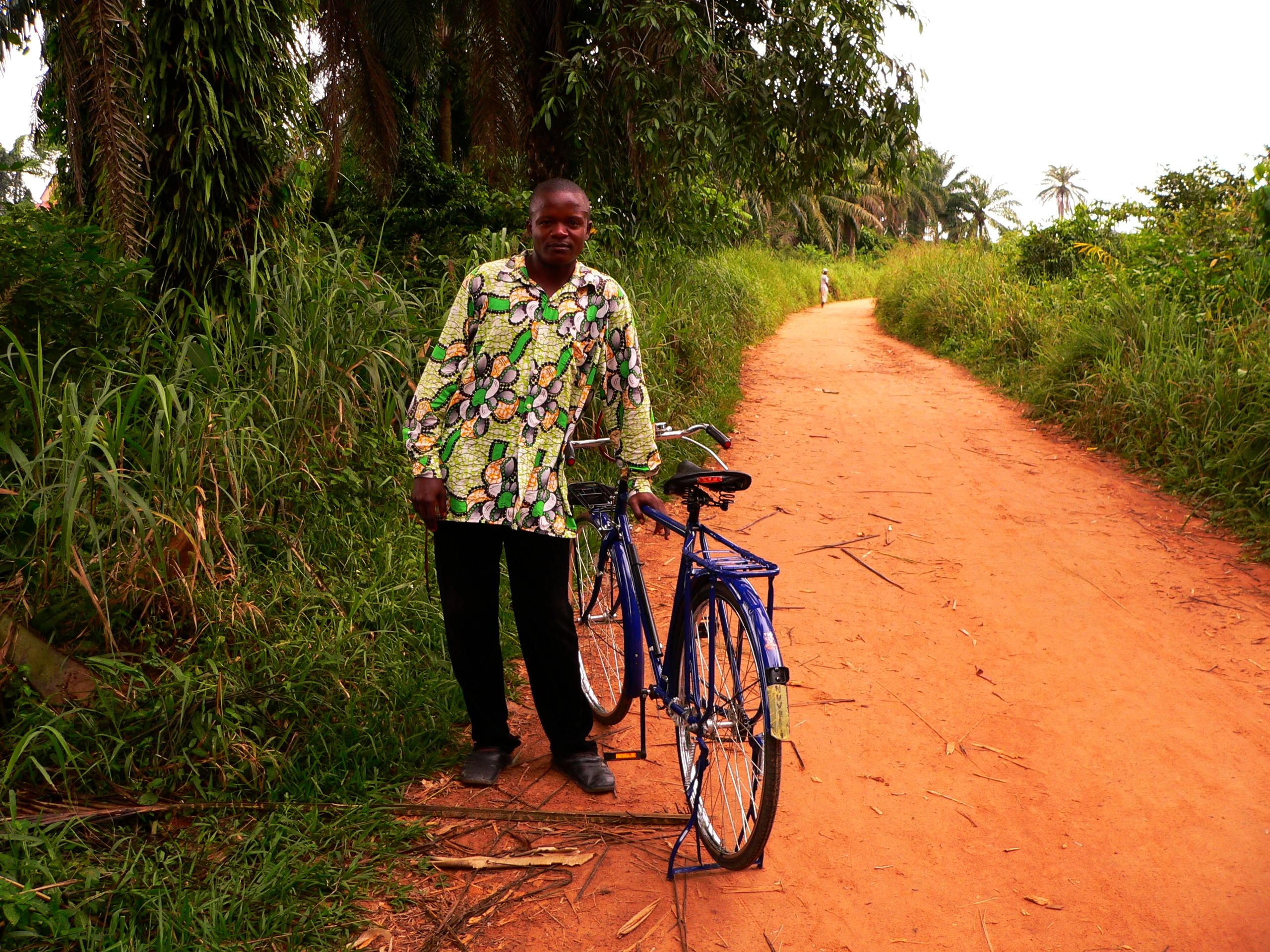
Man with a bicycle in Basankusu.

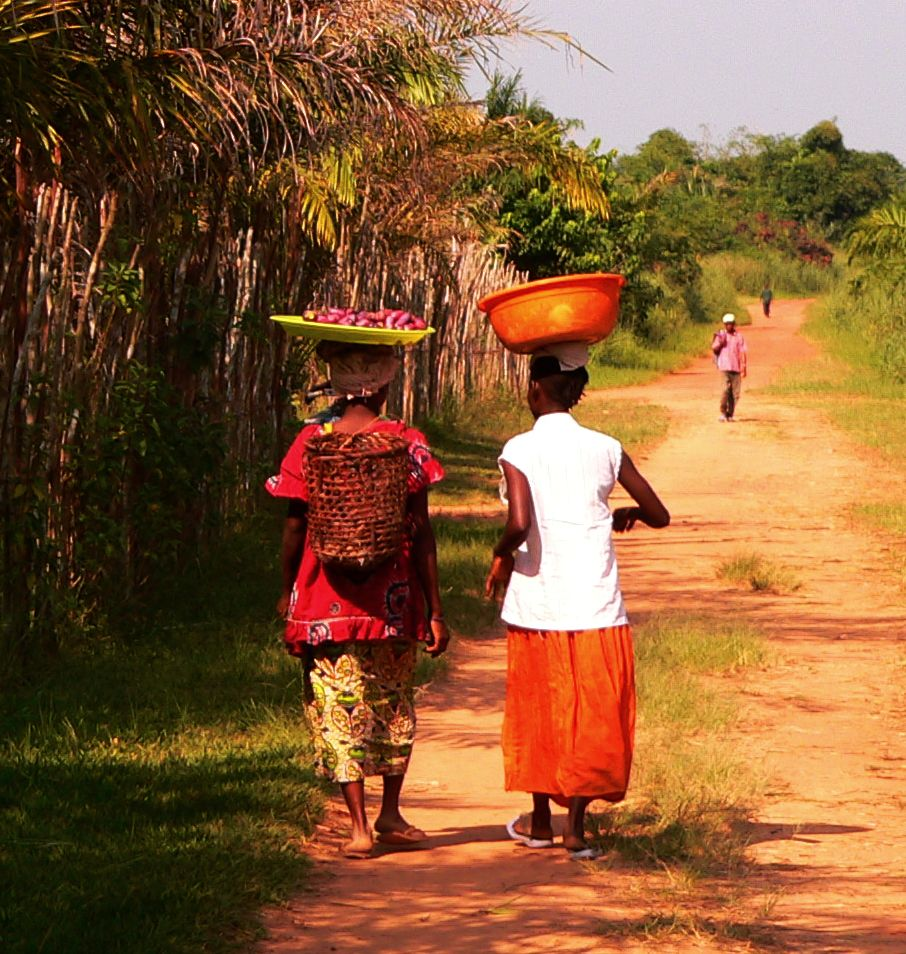
Carrying fruit in Basankusu.

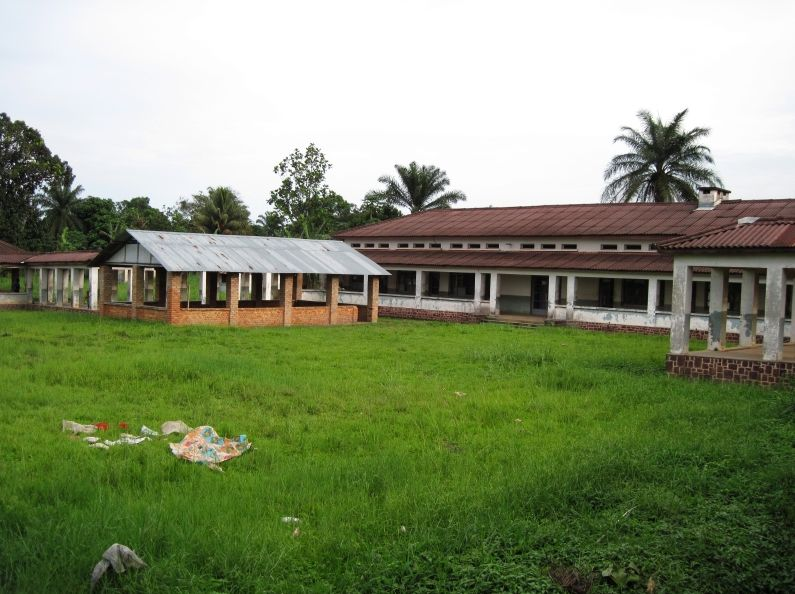
Basankusu Hospital.

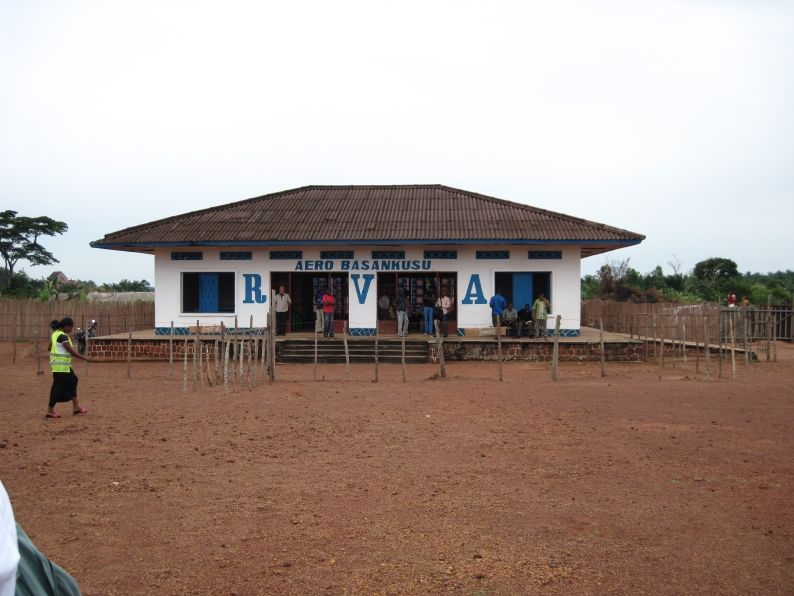
The airport building - Basankusu.

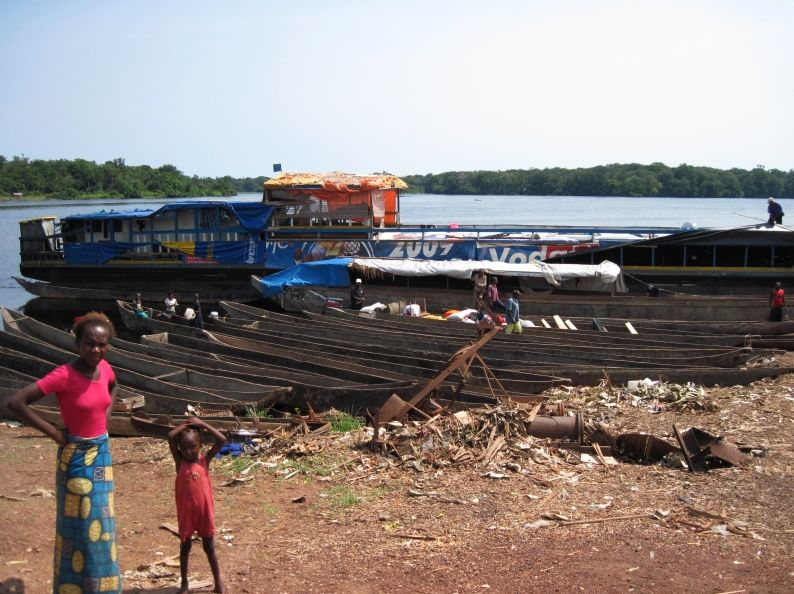
Basankusu boats

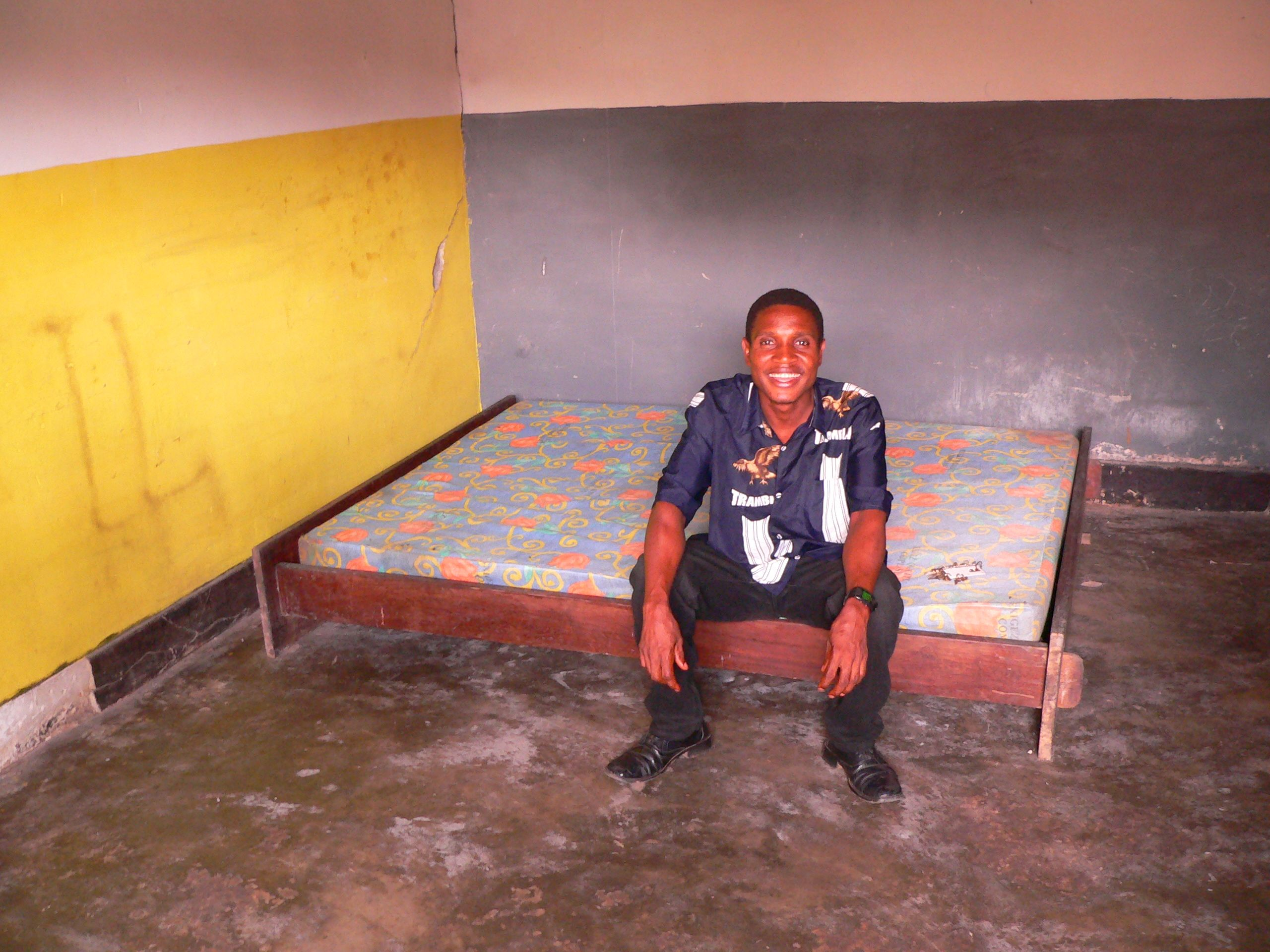
Basankusu: the hotel manager showing a standard room.

== See also ==
- Roman Catholicism in the Democratic Republic of the Congo
