= Archdiocese of Kisangani =

Roman Catholic archdiocese in the Democratic Republic of the Congo

Coordinates: 0.5096°N 25.1866°E

Archdiocese of Kisangani Archidioecesis Kisanganiensis
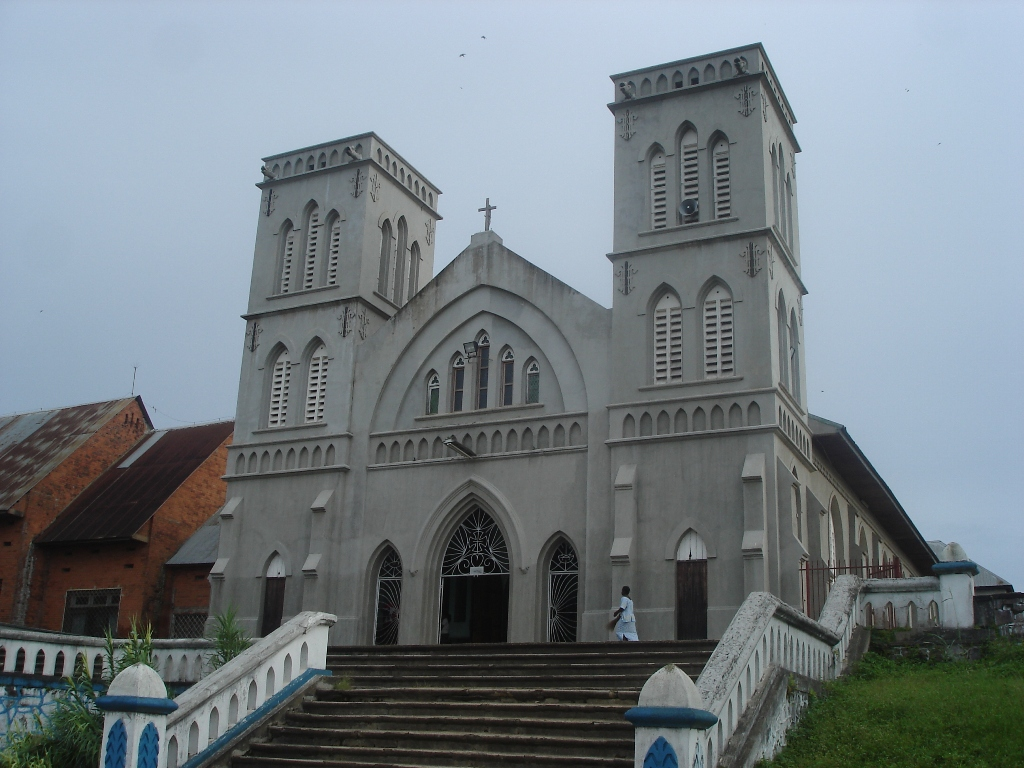
- Cathédrale Notre-Dame du Rosaire

Location
- Country: Democratic Republic of the Congo

Current leadership
- Pope: Leo XIV
- Archbishop: Marcel Utembi Tapa

Website
- https://www.archidiocesedekisangani.org/

The Roman Catholic Archdiocese of Kisangani (Latin: Kisanganien(sis)) is the Metropolitan See for the ecclesiastical province of Kisangani in the Democratic Republic of the Congo.

== History ==
- 3 August 1904: Established as the Apostolic Prefecture of Stanley Falls from the Apostolic Vicariate of Léopoldville
- 10 March 1908: Promoted as the Apostolic Vicariate of Stanley Falls
- 10 March 1949: Renamed as the Apostolic Vicariate of Stanley-ville
- 10 November 1959: Promoted as the Metropolitan Archdiocese of Stanley-ville
- 30 May 1966: Renamed as the Metropolitan Archdiocese of Kisangani

== Special churches ==
The seat of the archbishop is the Cathédrale Notre-Dame du Rosaire in Kisangani.

== Bishops ==
=== Ordinaries, in reverse chronological order ===
- Metropolitan Archbishops of Kisangani (Roman rite), below
  - Archbishop Marcel Utembi Tapa (since 28 November 2008)
  - Archbishop Laurent Monsengwo Pasinya (1 September 1988 – 6 December 2007); promoted to Metropolitan Archbishop of the Roman Catholic Archdiocese of Kinshasa and Primate of the DRC; named Cardinal in 2010
  - Archbishop Augustin Fataki Alueke (26 September 1967 - 1 September 1988)
  - Archbishop Nicolas Kinsch, S.C.I. (10 November 1959 - 26 September 1967); see below
- Vicars Apostolic of Stanley-ville (Roman rite), below
  - Bishop Nicolas Kinsch, S.C.I. (7 May 1958 – 10 November 1959); see above
  - Bishop Camille Verfaillie, S.C.I. (1 February 1934 – 1958)
- Vicar Apostolic of Stanley Falls (Roman rite), below
  - Bishop Émile-Gabriel Grison, S.C.I. (12 March 1908 - 28 March 1933); see below
- Prefect Apostolic of Stanley Falls (Roman rite), below
  - Father Émile-Gabriel Grison, S.C.I. (3 August 1904 - 12 March 1908); see above

=== Auxiliary bishops ===
- Alphonse-Marie Runiga Musanganya (1979-1980), appointed Bishop of Mahagi-Nioka
- Laurent Monsengwo Pasinya (1981-1988), appointed Archbishop here; future Cardinal
- Léonard Ndjadi Ndjate (since 13 May 2023)

== Suffragan dioceses ==
- Bondo
- Bunia
- Buta
- Doruma–Dungu
- Isangi
- Isiro–Niangara
- Mahagi–Nioka
- Wamba

== See also ==
- Roman Catholicism in the Democratic Republic of the Congo

== Sources ==
- GCatholic.org
- "Archdiocese of Kisangani". Catholic-Hierarchy.org. David M. Cheney.
