= Jérôme Gapangwa Nteziryayo =

Congolese prelate

The Most Reverend Jérôme Gapangwa Nteziryayo
- Church: Roman Catholic Church
- Diocese: Diocese of Uvira
- Appointed: 1 July 1985
- Installed: 20 October 1985
- Term ended: 10 June 2002

Orders
- Ordination: 20 August 1972 by Bishop Danilo Catarzi, S.X.
- Consecration: 20 October 1985

Personal details
- Born: 1 January 1942 (age 84) Kalongi, Democratic Republic of the Congo

Jérôme Gapangwa Nteziryayo (born 1 January 1942) is a Congolese prelate of the Roman Catholic Church. He served as Bishop of Uvira from 1985 to 2002.

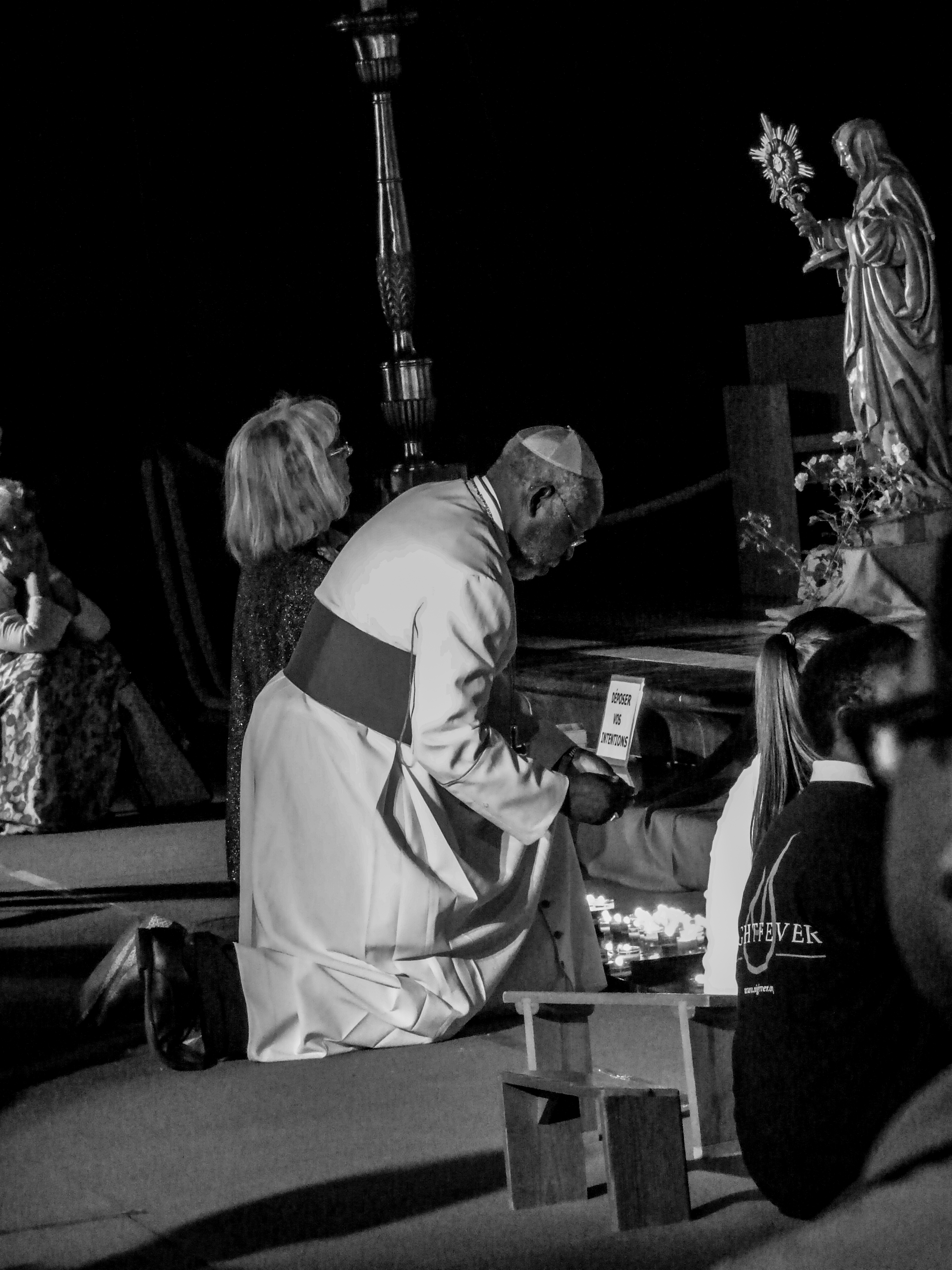
Monseigneur Jerome Gapangwa, évêque émérite du diocèse d'Uvira en RDC.

== Biography ==
Nteziryayo was born in Kalongi, Democratic Republic of the Congo, on 1 January 1942. He was ordained a priest of the Roman Catholic Diocese of Uvira on 20 August 1972 by Bishop Danilo Catarzi, S.X.

Pope John Paul II appointed him Bishop of Uvira on 1 July 1985. He was consecrated bishop on 20 October 1985, with Archbishop Aloys Mulindwa Mutabesha Mugoma Mweru, Archbishop of Bukavu, serving as principal consecrator, and Bishop Léonard Dhejju, Bishop of Bunia, and Bishop Faustin Ngabu, Bishop of Goma, serving as co-consecrators.

On 10 June 2002, Nteziryayo resigned from his position as bishop.

On 5 August 2006, concelebrated Mass at the International Youth Festival in Medjugorje, Bosnia and Herzegovina, and was one of two bishops at the festival.

== Episcopal lineage ==
- Cardinal Scipione Rebiba
- Cardinal Giulio Antonio Santorio (1566)
- Cardinal Girolamo Bernerio, O.P. (1586)
- Archbishop Galeazzo Sanvitale (1604)
- Cardinal Ludovico Ludovisi (1621)
- Cardinal Luigi Caetani (1622)
- Cardinal Ulderico Carpegna (1630)
- Cardinal Paluzzo Paluzzi Altieri degli Albertoni (1666)
- Pope Benedict XIII (1675)
- Pope Benedict XIV (1724)
- Pope Clement XIII (1743)
- Cardinal Bernardino Giraud (1767)
- Cardinal Alessandro Mattei (1777)
- Cardinal Pietro Francesco Galleffi (1819)
- Cardinal Filippo de Angelis (1826)
- Cardinal Amilcare Malagola (1876)
- Cardinal Giovanni Tacci Porcelli (1895)
- Pope John XXIII (1925)
- Bishop Joseph Mikararanga Busimba (1960)
- Archbishop Aloys Mulindwa Mutabesha Mugoma Mweru (1966)
- Bishop Jérôme Gapangwa Nteziryayo (1985)
