= François Abeli Muhoya Mutchapa =

Congolese Catholic prelate (born 1974)

The Most Reverend François Abeli Muhoya Mutchapa
- Bishop of Kindu, Democratic Republic of the Congo
- Church: Catholic Church
- Archdiocese: Roman Catholic Archdiocese of Bukavu
- See: Roman Catholic Diocese of Kindu
- Appointed: 18 November 2020
- Installed: 6 February 2021
- Predecessor: Willy Ngumbi Ngengele
- Successor: Incumbent

Orders
- Ordination: 6 January 2002
- Consecration: 6 February 2021 by Ettore Balestrero
- Rank: Bishop

Personal details
- Born: François Abeli Muhoya Mutchapa; 9 February 1974 (age 52) Kindu, Diocese of Kindu, Maniema Province, Democratic Republic of the Congo
- Motto: "Eritis mihi testes" (You are my love)

Styles of François Abeli Muhoya Mutchapa
- Reference style: Your Lordship; The Most Reverend
- Spoken style: His Lordship
- Religious style: Bishop

François Abeli Muhoya Mutchapa (born 9 February 1974) is a Congolese Catholic prelate who is the Bishop of the Roman Catholic Diocese of Kindu in the Democratic Republic of the Congo since 18 November 2020. Before that, from 6 January 2002 until he was appointed bishop, he was a priest of the same Roman Catholic diocese. He was appointed bishop on 18 November 2020 by Pope Francis. He was consecrated as bishop and installed at Kindu, Democratic Congo on 6 February 2021.

== Background and education ==
François Abeli Muhoya Mutchapa was born on 9 February 1974 in Kindu, Diocese of Kindu, Maniema Province, Democratic Congo. He attended primary school in his home area. He studied at the Petit Séminaire Notre-Dame des Apôtres in Kindu from 1987 until 1991. He spent his one-year preparatory period in the Roman Catholic Diocese of Kasongo from 1991 until 1992. He studied philosophy from 1992 until 1995 at the Monsignor Cleire Grand Séminaire in Kasongo. From 1999 until 2000, he studied theology at the Grand Séminaire de Murhesa Saint Pie X, in Bukavu. Later, from 2013 until 2020, he studied at the Pontifical Gregorian University in Rome, Italy where he was awarded a Licentiate and a Doctorate in the history and cultural heritage of the Catholic Church.

== Priest ==
On 6 January 2002, he was ordained a priest of the Roman Catholic Diocese of Kindu. He served as priest until 18 November 2020.

While a priest, he served in various roles including as:

- Parish vicar of the Saint-Esprit parish in Kindu from 2002 until 2003.
- Director of Diocesan Caritas in Kindu and formator at the Petit Séminaire Notre-Dame des Apôtres in Kindu from 2002 until 2008.
- Sunday vicar in the Saint-Esprit parish from 2003 until 2006.
- Sunday vicar in the Bienheureuse Anuarite parish in Kindu from 2006 until 2012.
- Coordinator of Caritas-Développement-Kindu from 2008 until 2009.
- Member of the Commission for Economic Affairs of the Diocese of Kindu from 2009 until 2012.
- Assistant to the second deputy secretary of Caritas-Développement Congo from 2012 until 2013.
- Studies at the Pontifical Gregorian University where he was awarded a licentiate and doctorate in history and cultural heritage of the Catholic Church from 2013 until 2020.
- Collaborator in the parishes of Santa Maria and San Mauro in the Roman Catholic Diocese of Tivoli in Italy from 2016 until 2020.

== Bishop ==
Pope Francis appointed him Bishop of the Roman Catholic Diocese of Kindu on 18 November 2020. He was consecrated and installed at Kindu on 6 February 2021 by the hands of Archbishop Ettore Balestrero, Titular Archbishop of Victoriana assisted by Archbishop François-Xavier Maroy Rusengo, Archbishop of Bukavu and Bishop Willy Ngumbi Ngengele He continues to administer to the diocese in precarious security and political situations.

== See also ==
- Catholic Church in the Democratic Republic of the Congo

== Succession table ==
Catholic Church titles
| Preceded by Willy Ngumbi Ngengele (25 April 2007 - 23 April 2019) | Bishop of Kindu (since 18 November 2020) | Succeeded by Incumbent |
