= Willy Ngumbi Ngengele =

Roman Catholic prelate in the DRC

The Right Reverend Willy Ngumbi Ngengele M.Afr
- Bishop of Goma
- Church: Catholic Church
- Archdiocese: Bukavu
- Appointed: 23 April 2019
- Installed: 19 May 2019
- Predecessor: Théophile Kaboy Ruboneka

Orders
- Ordination: 1 August 1993
- Consecration: 22 July 2007 by Théophile Kaboy Ruboneka

Personal details
- Born: 13 February 1965 (age 60) Bujumbura, Burundi

Styles of Willy Ngumbi Ngengele, M. Afr
- Reference style: His Grace; The Right Reverend
- Spoken style: Your Grace
- Religious style: Bishop

Willy Ngumbi Ngengele, M. Afr (13 February 1965) is a Roman Catholic prelate who serves as the Bishop of Goma since 2019, having been appointed to that position by Pope Francis.

== Background ==
Ngumbi Ngengele was born on 13 February 1965 in Bujumbura, the capital city of Burundi.

== Priest ==
He was ordained priest on 1 August 1993. He is a member of the Missionaries of Africa (White Fathers).

== Bishop ==
He was appointed bishop of the Diocese of Kindu on 25 April 2007 by Pope Benedict XVI and was consecrated bishop on 22 Jul 2007 at Kindu. He was consecrated by Bishop Théophile Kaboy Ruboneka, the Bishop of Kasongo, assisted by Archbishop François-Xavier Maroy Rusengo, the Archbishop of Bukavu, and Bishop Martin Albert Happe, the Bishop of Nouakchott.

At Goma, he succeeded Bishop Théophile Kaboy Ruboneka, then aged 78, whose resignation had been accepted by the Pope. He has been a vocal promoter of peace in the Eastern DRC where the Armed Forces of the Democratic Republic of the Congo (FARDC) are battling the March 23 Movement (M23), rebel military group. In January 2025, as fighting raged in and around Goma, the bishop issued a statement calling for respect for civilians. In his statement Bishop Ngengele called for “absolute respect by all parties, and in all circumstances, for human life and for private and public infrastructure in accordance with human dignity and international law”, and stressed in particular the need to ensure access to basic services for the population, and to avoid the scourge of sexual violence that so often accompanies armed conflict.

== See also ==
- Roman Catholicism in the Democratic Republic of the Congo

== Succession table ==
Catholic Church titles
Preceded by Paul Mambe Mukanga (15 March 1979 - 26 January 2004)	Bishop of Kindu (25 April 2007 - 23 April 2019)	Succeeded by François Abeli Muhoya Mutchapa (since 18 November 2020)
Preceded by Théophile Kaboy Ruboneka (18 March 2010 - 23 April 2019)	Bishop of Goma (since 23 April 2019)	Succeeded by Incumbent
