= Placide Lubamba Ndjibu =

Congolese Catholic prelate (born 1959)

The Most Reverend Placide Lubamba Ndjibu
- Bishop of Kasongo, Democratic Republic of the Congo
- Church: Catholic Church
- Archdiocese: Roman Catholic Archdiocese of Bukavu
- See: Roman Catholic Diocese of Kasongo
- Appointed: 11 March 2014
- Installed: 31 May 2014
- Predecessor: Théophile Kaboy Ruboneka
- Successor: Incumbent

Orders
- Ordination: 27 July 1991
- Consecration: 31 May 2014 by François-Xavier Maroy Rusengo
- Rank: Bishop

Personal details
- Born: Placide Lubamba Ndjibu; 26 October 1959 (age 66) Lubumbashi, Archdiocese of Lubumbashi, Democratic Republic of the Congo

Styles of Placide Lubamba Ndjibu
- Reference style: Your Lordship; The Most Reverend
- Spoken style: His Lordship
- Religious style: Bishop

Placide Lubamba Ndjibu M.Afr. (born 26 October 1959) is a Congolese Catholic prelate who is the Bishop of the Roman Catholic Diocese of Kasongo in the Democratic Republic of the Congo since 11 March 2014. Before that, from 27 July 1991 until he was appointed bishop, he was a priest of the Missionaries of Africa (White Fathers). He was appointed bishop on 11 March 2014 by Pope Francis. He was consecrated as bishop and installed at Kasongo, Democratic Congo on 31 May 2014.

== Background and education ==
He was born on 26 October 1959 in Lubumbashi, in the Archdiocese of Lubumbashi, in the Democratic Congo. He completed elementary school in 1972 and secondary school in 1979, in his home area. He graduated with a "State Diploma in General Pedagogy". He studied theology at the Catholic University of Toulouse in France. He then graduated with qualifications in journalism and social communications from the University of Fribourg, in Switzerland. While in seminary, he became a member of the Order of the Missionaries of Africa (White Fathers).

== Priest ==
On 27 July 1991, he was ordained a priest of the Order of the White Fathers. He served as priest until 11 March 2014.

While a priest, he served in various roles including as:

- Parish Vicar in the Parish of Notre Dame Deschamps, in the Archdiocese of Bobo-Dioulasso, in Burkina Faso from 1991 until 1994.
- Assistant priest and pastor of the Sacred Heart Parish in the Diocese of Manzeze, in Tanzania from 1998 until 2002.
- Editor of the Karibu Bulletin in Bukavu from 2002 until 2007.
- Chaplain of the Wima High School in Bukavu from 2002 until 2007.
- Chaplain of the Saio Military Barracks in Bukavu from 2002 until 2007.
- Priest of the St. Bernadette Parish in Lubumbashi from 2007 until 2010.
- Provincial of the White Fathers for Central Africa (Burundi, Rwanda and DR Congo), from 2010 until 2014.

== Bishop ==
Pope Francis appointed him Bishop of the Roman Catholic Diocese of Kasongo on 11 March 2014. He was consecrated and installed at Kasongo on 31 May 2014 by the hands of Archbishop François-Xavier Maroy Rusengo, Archbishop of Bukavu assisted by Bishop Melchisedec Sikuli Paluku, Bishop of Butembo-Beni and Bishop Théophile Kaboy Ruboneka, Bishop of Goma. He continues to administer to the diocese in a precarious security situation.

== See also ==
- Catholic Church in the Democratic Republic of the Congo

== Succession table ==
Catholic Church titles
Preceded by Théophile Kaboy Ruboneka (2 November 1995 - 21 April 2009)	Bishop of Kasongo (since 11 March 2014)	Succeeded by Incumbent
