= Théophile Kaboy Ruboneka =

Congolese Catholic prelate (born in 1941)

The Most Reverend Théophile Kaboy Ruboneka
- Bishop Emeritus of Goma, Democratic Republic of the Congo
- Church: Catholic Church
- Archdiocese: Roman Catholic Archdiocese of Bukavu
- See: Roman Catholic Diocese of Goma
- Appointed: 21 April 2009
- Installed: 18 March 2010
- Term ended: 23 April 2019
- Predecessor: Faustin Ngabu
- Successor: Willy Ngumbi Ngengele
- Other posts: Bishop]] of Kasongo (2 November 1995 - 21 April 2009); Coadjutor Bishop of Goma (21 April 2009 - 18 March 2010)

Orders
- Ordination: 27 August 1972
- Consecration: 19 March 1996 by Faustin Ngabu
- Rank: Bishop

Personal details
- Born: Théophile Kaboy Ruboneka; 27 February 1941 (age 85) Bombandana, Democratic Republic of the Congo
- Motto: "That they may have life and have it to the full"

Styles of Théophile Kaboy Ruboneka
- Reference style: Your Lordship; The Most Reverend
- Spoken style: His Lordship
- Religious style: Bishop

Théophile Kaboy Ruboneka (born 27 February 1941) is a Congolese Catholic prelate who is the Bishop Emeritus of the Roman Catholic Diocese of Goma, in the Democratic Republic of the Congo, since his age-related retirement on 23 April 2019. He served as the Local Ordinary at Goma from 18 March 2010. Before that, from 21 April 2009 until 10 March 2010, he was Coadjutor Bishop of the Catholic Diocese of Goma. He succeeded at Goma when Bishop Faustin Ngabu retired. Prior to then, Bishop Théophile Kaboy Ruboneka was the bishop of the Roman Catholic Diocese of Kasongo, from 2 November 1995 until 21 April 2009. He was appointed bishop by Pope John Paul II. He was consecrated and installed at Kasongo, on 19 March 1996. On 21 April 2009, The Holy Father transferred him to the Diocese of Goma as Coadjutor Bishop. He succeeded as the Local Ordinary on 18 March 2010. He was installed at Goma on 11 April 2010. He retired from pastoral care on 23 April 2019 at the age of 78 years.

== Background and education ==
Théophile Kaboy Ruboneka was born on 27 February 1941. He studied philosophy and theology at seminary. He holds a Bachelor of Business Administration (BBA) degree awarded by the Catholic University of Eichstätt-Ingolstadt in Germany, where he studied from 1966 until 1970. Later, he graduated with an advanced degree in Philosophy from the Pontifical Gregorian University, in Rome, Italy.

== Priest ==
He was ordained a priest on 27 August 1972. He served as priest until 2 November 1995.

== As bishop ==
On 2 November 1995, Pope John Paul II appointed Reverend Father Théo phile Kaboy Ruboneka, as bishop of the Roman Catholic Diocese of Kasongo. He was consecrated and installed at Kasongo, on 19 March 1996. The Principal Consecrator was Bishop Faustin Ngabu, Bishop of Goma assisted by Archbishop Faustino Sainz Muñoz, Titular Archbishop of Novaliciana and Archbishop Christophe Munzihirwa Mwene Ngabo, Archbishop of Bukavu.

On 21 April 2009, Pope Benedict transferred him to the Diocese of Goma in the Metropolitan Ecclesiastical Province of Bukavu and named him Coadjutor Bishop there. Following the age-related resignation of Bishop Faustin Ngabu on 18 March 2018, he succeeded at Goma, as the Local Ordinary. He was installed at Goma om 11 April 2010. He retired as bishop on 23 April 2019 and was succeeded by Bishop Willy Ngumbi Ngengele, M.Afr..

== See also ==
- Catholic Church in the Democratic Republic of the Congo

== Succession table ==
Catholic Church titles
Preceded by Christophe Munzihirwa Mwene Ngabo (30 April 1990 - 14 March 1995)	Bishop of Kasongo (2 November 1995 - 21 April 2009)	Succeeded by Placide Lubamba Ndjibu (since 11 March 2014)
Preceded by	Coadjutor Bishop of Goma (21 April 2009 - 18 March 2010)	Succeeded by
Preceded by Faustin Ngabu (7 September 1974 - 18 March 2010)	Bishop of Goma (18 March 2010 - 23 April 2019)	Succeeded by Willy Ngumbi Ngengele (since 23 April 2019)
