= Centre de Recherche en Hydrobiologie =

Public scientific research institution in Uvira, South Kivu

- Other name: CRH-Uvira
- Founder: Institut pour la Recherche Scientifique en Afrique Centrale (IRSAC)
- Established: 26 May 1950; 76 years ago
- Mission: To conduct scientific research on aquatic ecosystems and water bodies across the Democratic Republic of the Congo, with the goal of promoting biodiversity conservation and sustainable resource management.
- Focus: Hydrobiology, fisheries, aquatic biodiversity, and limnology
- Location: No. 115 Avenue du Congo, Kimanga, Kalundu, Uvira, South Kivu, Democratic Republic of the Congo

The Centre de Recherche en Hydrobiologie, better known by its acronym CRH-Uvira, is a prominent public scientific research institution situated at No. 115 Avenue du Congo, in the Kimanga quarter of Kalundu, Uvira, in the South Kivu province. It is bordered to the north by the offices of the NGOs Commission Diocésaine Justice et Paix and Radio Notre Dame de Tanganyika (RNDT), to the south by the Nuru School Complex, to the east by the administrative headquarters of the Sokola Sector 2 of South Kivu, and to the west by the residence of the general vicar and Catholic clergy (formerly Alpha House), as well as the Shaloom School Complex.

Originally established under the name Centre de Recherche Scientifique du Tanganyika, it was inaugurated on 26 May 1950, as the first research center of the former Institut pour la Recherche Scientifique en Afrique Centrale (IRSAC). The CRH was founded with the aim of advancing interdisciplinary research in biological, human, and physical sciences, with a particular focus on the unique aquatic ecosystems of Lake Tanganyika. Early research at the center was marked by the work of Belgian expatriate scientists who pioneered underwater exploration and documented the high endemism of the lake's fish and invertebrate fauna.

The center's operations were disrupted during the 1964 Mulelist rebellion, which resulted in the closure of the facility and the loss of significant scientific material. Research activities resumed in the late 1970s with renewed efforts by Congolese scientists and visiting scholars from the University of Kyoto. This period of revitalization was supported by international training programs funded by the Japanese Ministry of Education. In 1994, the station was officially elevated to the status of an independent research center under the name Centre de Recherche en Hydrobiologie (CRH-Uvira), reporting directly to the Ministry of Higher Education and Scientific Research. Despite setbacks during the First and Second Congo Wars, the center was rehabilitated through regional cooperation supported by the United Nations Development Programme (UNDP) and continues to conduct ecological, hydrological, and fisheries research.

== History ==
The origins of the Centre de Recherche en Hydrobiologie (CRH-Uvira) are closely tied to Belgian Congo's post-World War II efforts to promote scientific research as a tool for development in Central Africa. In response to the region's complex socio-economic and ecological challenges, Belgian Congo established the Institut pour la Recherche Scientifique en Afrique Centrale (IRSAC) on 1 July 1947. Conceived as an interdisciplinary institution, IRSAC was tasked with conducting research in biological sciences, human sciences, and physical sciences. It was chaired by King Leopold II of Belgium.

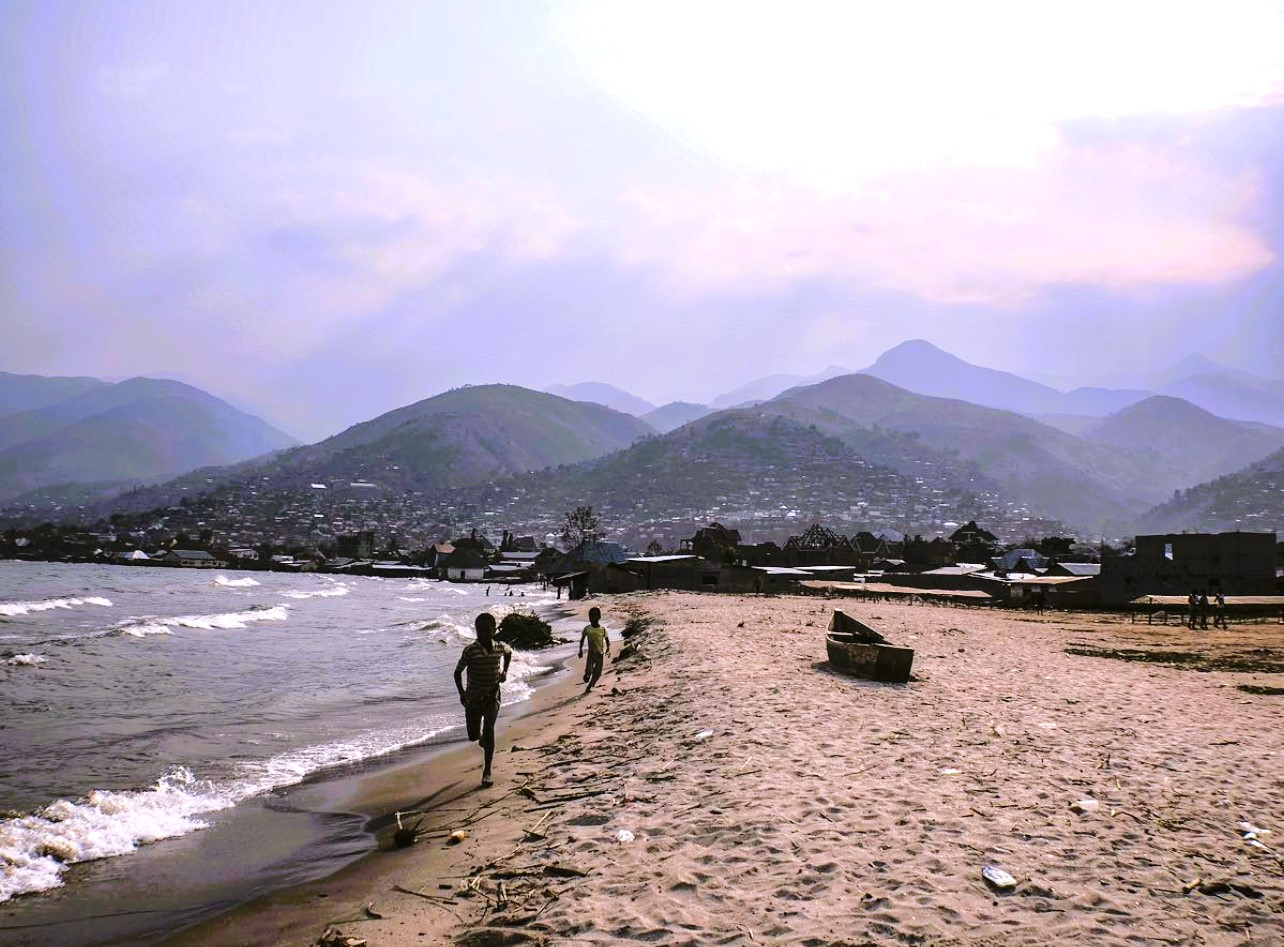
Lake Tanganyika in Uvira

Construction of what would become the first IRSAC research station began in 1948 in Kalundu, Uvira. By 1949, the main administrative building, researchers' residences, and supporting infrastructure had been completed. The research station was officially inaugurated on 26 May 1950 under the name Centre de Recherche Scientifique du Tanganyika (Tanganyika Scientific Research Center), which marked the launch of IRSAC's scientific operations on the ground. Right from its inception, the center emerged as a center of scientific research, predominantly led by Belgian expatriate scientists. Its early work focused on hydrobiology and zoology, taking advantage of the biodiversity found in Lake Tanganyika. Researchers employed autonomous scuba diving equipment to explore beneath the lake's surface and identified a high concentration of endemic species, especially among fish, mollusks, and aquatic insects, with these insights positioning the lake as a "natural laboratory".

Among the center's significant early contributions was the 1958 experimental introduction of the sardine species Limnothrissa miodon, locally known as Lumbu in the Kivira language, from Lake Tanganyika into Lake Kivu. This was part of a wider initiative to boost fishery resources in the area, with feasibility studies and controlled trials conducted at the center's laboratories. Although the species initially struggled to establish itself, by 1972 it appeared in the catches of Lake Kivu fishermen. The center's early researchers included Georges Marlier (director), Narcisse Leleup, Jean Dubois, R. Kiss, Hubert Matthes, and J.J. Simoens. However, the center's progress was abruptly halted in 1964 during the Mulelist rebellion. Expatriate scientists were forced to flee, and the center ceased operations. Its facilities were ransacked, equipment and archives looted, and the premises repurposed as the rebel headquarters. The building was damaged by multiple bombings and leading to a period of complete inactivity.

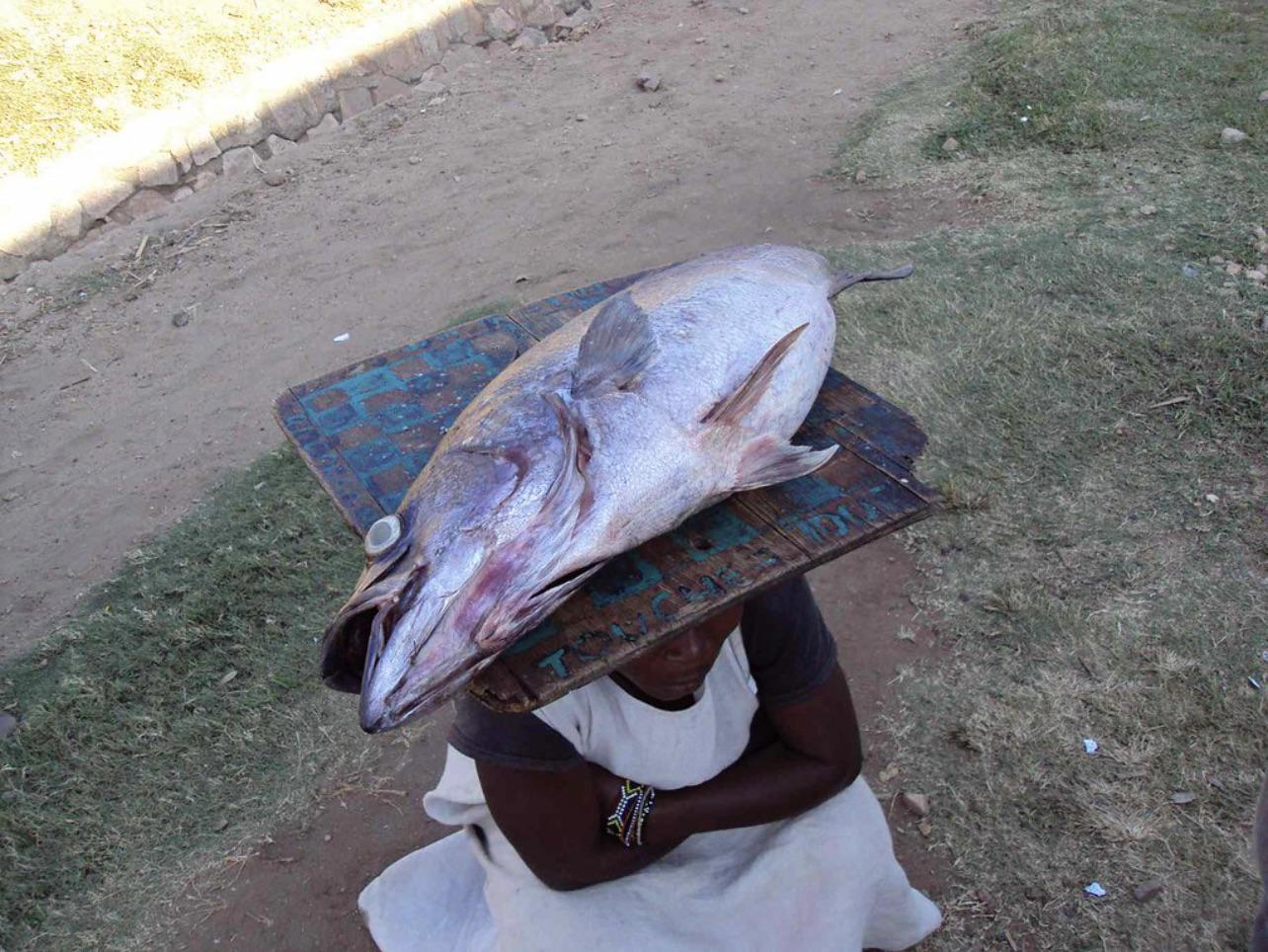
A large fish, caught by a woman balancing it on her head from Lake Tanganyika, en route to the market in Uvira

On 22 October 1975, the Congolese government established the Institute for Scientific Research (Institut de Recherche Scientifique; IRS), a consolidation of several scientific bodies including IRSAC, the National Office for Research and Development (Office National de la Recherche et de Développement; ONRD), and the Industrial Research Center in Central Africa (Centre de Recherche Industrielle en Afrique Centrale; CRIAC). Under this new framework, the Uvira station was integrated as a satellite of the IRS headquarters in Lwiro, Kabare Territory. In 1977, scientific activity resumed at the Uvira station, largely through renewed international collaboration. Researchers from Kyoto University in Japan arrived, who ushered in a new phase of cooperation, training, and infrastructure development supported by the Japanese Ministry of Education. A new generation of Congolese scientists was trained in aquatic research methodologies through this partnership.

Until 1993, the Uvira facility remained administratively dependent on the Centre de Recherche en Sciences Naturelles (CRSN) in Lwiro. However, on 6 January 1994, the facility was elevated to the status of an independent research institution directly reporting to the Ministry of Higher Education and Scientific Research (Enseignement Supérieur Universitaire et Recherche Scientifique; ESURS). It was officially renamed the Centre de Recherche en Hydrobiologie (CRH-Uvira), with a broadened mandate to conduct scientific research on all freshwater and aquatic ecosystems across the country.

During the First Congo War (1996–1997), the center was again looted, with most of its scientific infrastructure being destroyed. Recovery efforts were made possible through a regional initiative known as the Lake Tanganyika Biodiversity Project, which was supported by the United Nations Development Programme (UNDP) and the four riparian states of Lake Tanganyika. As part of this project, the CRH was rehabilitated and re-equipped with laboratories and research facilities by August 1999. Upgrades included the installation of specialized laboratories for pollution analysis, sedimentation studies, biological research, as well as a new collection room and an aquarium facility. On 10 July 2021, it was reported that CRH-Uvira had faced operational problems for several years, with its director, Jean-Marie Muhoza Bitaka, noting that insufficient government funding had hampered research efforts. By October of that year, the rehabilitation work at the facility was nearly complete. This restoration was essential for reintegrating CRH-Uvira into Lake Tanganyika's water quality monitoring network under the European Union-funded LATAWAMA project, implemented by Enabel in partnership with the Lake Tanganyika Authority. The project had reportedly already completed around 95% of the rehabilitation work. The center also planned to expand its environmental research and monitoring capacity, including the creation of a new unit in Kalemie to improve operational efficiency in the lake's central and southern areas.

== Organization and infrastructure ==
=== Research departments and sections ===
As of the early 2000s, CRH-Uvira comprised three main research departments:

Department	Section
Department of Biology	Section of Zoology; Section of Botany; Section of Microbiology
Department of Hydrology	Department of Hydrodynamics; Section of Hydrochemistry
Department of Fisheries Economics	Section of Statistics and Fisheries Economics; Section of Sociology and Fishing Techniques

=== Laboratories, facilities and ongoing research programs ===
CRH-Uvira hosts several specialized laboratories to support its research mandates, including a Pollution Laboratory, a Sedimentation Laboratory, and a Biology Laboratory. The center also features a Natural History Museum and Collection Room, which houses preserved fish specimens, and an Aquarium Room equipped with a 12-cubic-meter capacity tank.

CRH-Uvira was engaged in several active research programs, including:

Program	Description
Conservation	Assessment of the impact of fishing gear on fish diversity along the Lake Tanganyika shoreline.
Erosion	Investigation into erosion patterns in Uvira.
In vitro Culture	Cultivation of spirulina conducted in the biology laboratory.
Monitoring program	Research monitoring in collaboration with the Burundi Fisheries Department under the Lake Tanganyika Research (LTR) project, funded by Food and Agriculture Organization (FAO) and Finland.
PBEATRA program	Participation in the Biodiversity of Aquatic and Terrestrial Ecosystems in the Rift Programme (Programme Biodiversite des Ecosystemes Aquatiques et Terrestres dans le Rift, PBEATRA), supported by the MacArthur Foundation, in cooperation with the Centre de Recherche en Sciences Naturelles (CRSN), the Congolese Institute for Nature Conservation (ICCN), and the Natural History Museum.
Regional Lake Tanganyika Fisheries (Programme régional sur la pêche au Lac Tanganyika) program	Participation in a regional fisheries management project for Lake Tanganyika, supported by the African Development Bank (AfDB) and FAO, with involvement from all four riparian countries.

=== Infrastructure ===
As of 2001, the CRH-Uvira campus comprises a one-story administrative building with 52 rooms, six villas for senior staff housing, a guest house with 15 rooms, and two traditional huts. There is also a workers' housing compound in Mulongwe containing nine paired houses. Diving equipment includes compressor motors, autonomous scuba sets, and complete diving suits with buoyancy compensators, masks, fins, and related gear. For navigation and fieldwork, CRH-Uvira operates a Zodiac inflatable boat, a 13-meter wooden boat, a 7-meter fiberglass boat, the Angela boat (39 tons, 11m by 6m), and four outboard motors with varying horsepower (15 HP, 25 HP, 40 HP, and 55 HP). The vehicle fleet includes a Toyota Hilux double-cab pickup and a Suzuki Jimny. Laboratory equipment includes a Hach 2000 spectrophotometer, microscopes, binoculars, and an oven capable of reaching temperatures up to 1000°C.
