= Paul Mambe Mukanga =

Congolese Catholic prelate (born in 1929)

The Most Reverend Paul Mambe Mukanga
- Bishop of Kindu, Democratic Republic of the Congo (Deceased)
- Church: Catholic Church
- Archdiocese: Roman Catholic Archdiocese of Bukavu
- See: Roman Catholic Diocese of Kindu
- Appointed: 13 March 1979
- Installed: 24 June 1979
- Term ended: 26 January 2004
- Predecessor: Albert Onyembo Lomandjo
- Successor: Willy Ngumbi Ngengele

Orders
- Ordination: 24 December 1957
- Consecration: 24 June 1979 by Aloys Mulindwa Mutabesha Mugoma Mweru
- Rank: Bishop

Personal details
- Born: Paul Mambe Mukanga; April 13, 1929; Schopo, Diocese of Tshumbe, Sankuru Province, Democratic Republic of the Congo
- Died: 26 January 2004 (aged 74); Kinshasa, Democratic Republic of the Congo

Styles of Paul Mambe Mukanga
- Reference style: Your Lordship; The Most Reverend
- Spoken style: His Lordship
- Religious style: Bishop

Paul Mambe Mukanga (13 April 1929 - 26 January 2004) was a Congolese Catholic prelate who was the bishop of the Roman Catholic Diocese of Kindu in the Democratic Republic of the Congo, from 15 March 1979 until his death on 26 January 2004. Prior to that, from 28 December 1957, until he was appointed bishop, he was a Catholic priest. He was appointed bishop by Pope John Paul II. He was consecrated and installed at Kindu, on 24 June 1979. He died in office on 24 January 2004, at the age of 74.

== Background and education ==
Paul Mambe Mukanga was born on 13 April 1929 in Schopo, Roman Catholic Diocese of Tshumbe, Sankuru Province, in the Democratic Republic of the Congo. He studied philosophy at Kabwe Major Seminary in Kabwe, DR Congo, graduating in 1952. He then studied theology at the same seminary, graduating in 1957. Later he obtained a degree in economics from the Catholic University of Louvain, in Belgium in 1966.

== Priest ==
On 28 December 1957, he was ordained a priest. He served as priest until 15 March 1979.

== As bishop ==
On 15 March 1979, Pope John Paul II appointed Reverend Paul Mambe Mukanga, previously the Administrative Secretary of the Catholic Theological Faculty, Kinshasa as the new bishop of the Roman Catholic Diocese of Kindu.

He was consecrated and installed at Kindu by Archbishop Aloys Mulindwa Mutabesha Mugoma Mweru, Archbishop of Bukavu assisted by Bishop Albert Tshomba Yungu, Bishop of Tshumbe and Bishop Tharcisse Tshibangu Tshishiku, Titular Bishop of Scampa. While bishop, he was elected Vice-President of the Episcopal Conference of the Congo. He died in office on 28 January 2004 at the age of 74.

== See also ==
- Catholic Church in the Democratic Republic of the Congo

== Succession table ==
Catholic Church titles
Preceded by Albert Onyembo Lomandjo (17 May 1966 - 17 January 1978)	Bishop of Kindu (15 March 1979 - 26 January 2004)	Succeeded by Willy Ngumbi Ngengele (25 April 2007 - 23 April 2019)
