= Sébastien-Joseph Muyengo Mulombe =

Congolese Catholic prelate (born 1958)

The Most Reverend Sébastien-Joseph Muyengo Mulombe
- Bishop of Uvira, Democratic Republic of the Congo
- Church: Catholic Church
- Archdiocese: Roman Catholic Archdiocese of Bukavu
- See: Roman Catholic Diocese of Uvira
- Appointed: 15 October 2013
- Installed: 8 December 2013
- Predecessor: Jean-Pierre Tafunga Mbayo
- Successor: Incumbent

Orders
- Ordination: 1 August 1986
- Consecration: 15 April 2012 by Cardinal Laurent Monsengwo Pasinya
- Rank: Bishop

Personal details
- Born: Sébastien-Joseph Muyengo Mulombe; 8 May 1958 (age 68) Bukavu, Archdiocese of Bukavu, South Kivu, Democratic Republic of the Congo

Styles of Sébastien-Joseph Muyengo Mulombe
- Reference style: Your Lordship; The Most Reverend
- Spoken style: His Lordship
- Religious style: Bishop

Sébastien-Joseph Muyengo Mulombe (born 8 May 1958) is a Congolese Catholic prelate who is the Bishop of the Roman Catholic Diocese of Uvira in the Democratic Republic of the Congo since 15 October 2013. Before that, from 2 February 2012 until 15 October 2013, he was an auxiliary bishop of the Roman Catholic Archdiocese of Kinshasa. He was appointed bishop by Pope Benedict XVI. He was concurrently appointed Titular Bishop of Strathernia. He was consecrated as bishop and installed at Kinshasa, Democratic Congo on 15 April 2012. On 15 October 2013, The Holy Father transferred him to Uvira and appointed him the Local Ordinary there. He was installed at Uvira on 8 December 2013.

== Background and education ==
Sébastien-Joseph Muyengo Mulombe was born on 8 May 1958 in Bukavu, South Kivu, in DR Congo. He studied philosophy and theology at seminary. He studied at the University of Toulouse II, graduating with an advanced postgraduate diploma (Diplôme d'études appliquées) (DEA) in Philosophy. He also holds a Doctorate in Theology with specialization in Bioethics from the Catholic University of Toulouse, in France.

== Priest ==
On 1 August 1986, he was ordained a priest of the Roman Catholic Archdiocese of Kinshasa. He served as priest until 2 February 2012.

While a priest, he served in various roles including as:

- Professor and Rector of various seminaries in Kinshasa.
- Professor of Bioethics and Fundamental Morality at the Catholic University of Congo from 2004 until 2007.
- Dean of the Faculty of Social Communications at the Catholic University of Congo.
- Studies at the Catholic University of Toulouse, France leading to the award of a doctorate in moral theology in 1995.
- Director of the Lindonge Pastoral Center in Kinshasa from 1996 until 2000.
- Director of the Jean-XXIII Major Seminary in Kinshasa from 2001 until 2008
- Vice-president of the DRC's national bioethics committee.
- Pastor of the parish of Saint-Léopold from 2004 until 2007.
- Professor at the Faculty of Theology, Catholic University of Congo in Kinshasa from 2004 until 2007.

== Bishop ==
Pope Benedict XVI appointed him Auxiliary Bishop of the Roman Catholic Archdiocese of Kinshasa on 2 February 2012. He was concurrently appointed Titular Bishop of Strathernia. He was consecrated and installed at Kinshasa on 15 April 2012 by the hands of Cardinal Laurent Monsengwo Pasinya, Archbishop of Kinshasa assisted by Bishop José Moko Ekanga, Bishop of Idiofa and Bishop Philippe Nkiere Keana, Bishop of Inongo.

The Holy Father transferred him to Uvira on 15 October 2013 and appointed him the local ordinary there. He was installed at Uvira on 8 December 2013. He continues to administer to the diocese in precarious security and political situations.

== See also ==
- Catholic Church in the Democratic Republic of the Congo

== Succession table ==
Catholic Church titles
Preceded by	Auxiliary Bishop of Kinshasa (2 February 2012 - 15 October 2013)	Succeeded by
Preceded by Jean-Pierre Tafunga Mbayo (10 June 2002 - 31 July 2008)	Bishop of Uvira (since 15 October 2025)	Succeeded by Incumbent
