= Diocese of Goma =

Diocese of Goma may refer to:

- Anglican Diocese of Goma, a diocese of the Province of the Anglican Church of the Congo
- Catholic Diocese of Goma
