= Faustin Ngabu =

Congolese Roman Catholic prelate (1935–2025)

His Excellency Faustin Ngabu
- Bishop Emeritus of Goma
- Archdiocese: Bukavu
- Diocese: Goma
- Installed: 7 September 1974
- Term ended: 18 March 2010
- Predecessor: Joseph Mikararanga Busimba
- Successor: Théophile Kaboy Ruboneka
- Previous posts: Coadjutor Bishop of Goma and Titular Bishop of Tigamibena (1974)

Orders
- Ordination: 21 December 1963
- Consecration: 27 October 1974 by Aloys Mulindwa Mutabesha Mugoma Mweru, Gabriel Ukec and Augustin Fataki Alueke

Personal details
- Born: 1935 Lokwa, Belgian Congo
- Died: 26 October 2025 (aged 90) Goma, Democratic Republic of the Congo
- Motto: Ut omnes unum sint

Faustin Ngabu (1935 – 26 October 2025) was a Congolese Roman Catholic prelate. He was bishop of Goma from 1974 to 2010. Ngabu died on 26 October 2025, at the age of 90.

Catholic Church titles
| Preceded by Joseph Mikararanga Busimba | Bishop of Goma; 1974–2010 | Succeeded by Théophile Kaboy Ruboneka |
| Preceded by Patrick Kla Juwle | Titular Bishop of Tigamibena; 1974 | Succeeded by Edward Marian Frankowski |
