= Edward Frankowski =

Polish Catholic prelate (born 1937)

- Titular Bishop of Tigamibena
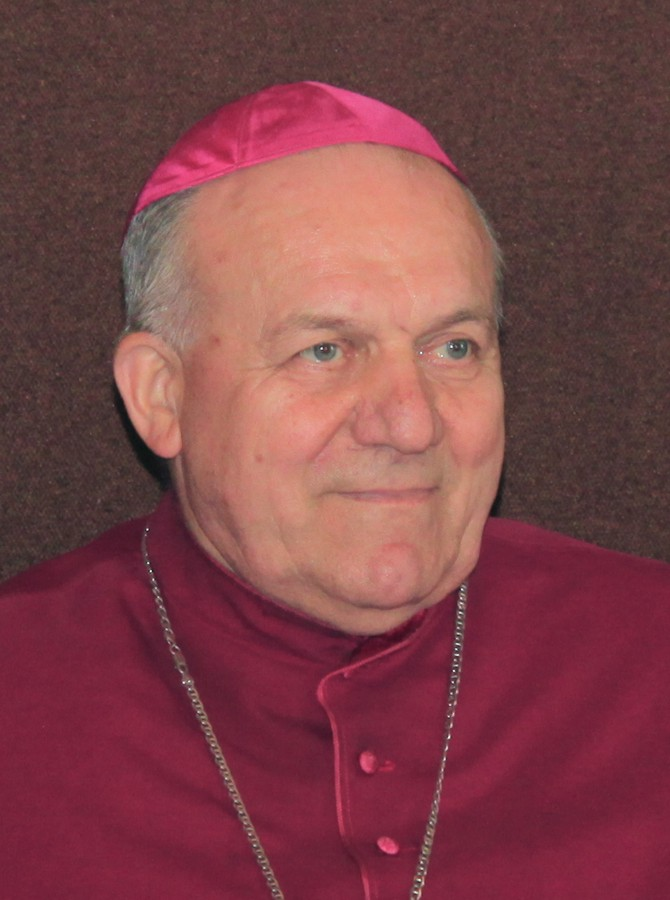
- Edward Frankowski photographed in 2009.
- Church: Catholic Church
- See: Tigamibena
- Appointed: 16 February 1989
- Predecessor: Faustin Ngabu
- Other post: Auxiliary Bishop Emeritus of Sandomierz (since 2012)
- Previous posts: Auxiliary Bishop of Sandomierz (1992-2012); Auxiliary Bishop of Przemyśl (1989-1992)

Orders
- Ordination: 18 June 1961 by Franciszek Barda
- Consecration: 5 March 1989 by Ignacy Tokarczuk

Personal details
- Born: Edward Marian Frankowski; 15 August 1937 (age 88) Kępa Rzeczycka, Lwów Voivodeship, Poland

Edward Marian Frankowski (born August 15, 1937) is Polish Catholic prelate. He is Bishop Emeritus of Sandomierz.

== Biography ==
Edward Frankowski attended the seminary in Przemyśl, studied pastoral theology, and was ordained a priest on June 18, 1961, by Franciszek Barda, Bishop of Przemyśl. He was subsequently incardinated into the clergy of the Diocese of Sandomierz-Radom. In his parish ministry, he actively supported the Solidarity movement. He participated in social activism, defending the rights of the working population, particularly during the 1988 strike at the Wola steelworks. His priestly activities were monitored by the communist authorities.

Pope John Paul II appointed Frankowski titular bishop of Tigamibena and auxiliary bishop of Przemyśl on February 16, 1989. Bishop Ignacy Tokarczuk of Przemyśl consecrated him a bishop on March 5 of the same year; the co-consecrators were Auxiliary Bishops Bolesław Łukasz Taborski and Stefan Moskwa.

On March 25, 1992, Frankowski was appointed auxiliary bishop of Sandomierz. In 2005, he received his doctorate in social sciences.

After Frankowski offered his resignation to Pope Benedict XVI on July 15, 2012, due to his advanced age, the Pope accepted the resignation in accordance with canons 411 and 401 § 1 of the Code of Canon Law, effective October 6, 2012.

== Awards and Honors ==
- 1992 Honorary citizen of the Will of Steel.
- 1994 Honorary member of the “Solidarity”.
- 2004 Medal “Gaude Mater Polonia”.
- 2005 Gold Medal of the Association of Officers of the Polish Republic.
- 2006 Grand Cross of the Order of the Polish Restituta.
- 2007 Honorary citizen of the municipality of Radomyśl nad Sanem.
- 2007 Medal “For Services to the Catholic University of Lublin”.
- 2007 Honorary citizen of Sandomierz.
- 2009 Honorary citizen of the city of Tarnobrzeg.
