= Emmanuel Kataliko =

Congolese Catholic prelate (born 1932)

The Most Reverend Emmanuel Kataliko
- Archbishop of Bukavu, Democratic Republic of the Congo (Deceased)
- Church: Catholic Church
- Archdiocese: Roman Catholic Archdiocese of Bukavu
- See: Bukavu
- Appointed: 3 Mar 1997
- Installed: 3 Mar 1997
- Term ended: 4 October 2000
- Predecessor: Christophe Munzihirwa Mwene Ngabo
- Successor: Charles Kambale Mbogha
- Other post: Bishop of Diocese of Butembo-Beni (17 May 1966 - 3 March 1997)

Orders
- Ordination: 20 December 1958
- Consecration: 11 October 1966 by Henri Joseph Marius Piérard
- Rank: Bishop

Personal details
- Born: Emmanuel Kataliko; January 1, 1932 Lubero Territory, North Kivu, Democratic Republic of the Congo
- Died: October 4, 2000 (aged 68) Rome, Italy

Styles of Emmanuel Kataliko
- Reference style: Your Lordship; The Most Reverend
- Spoken style: His Lordship
- Religious style: Bishop

Emmanuel Kataliko (1932 - 4 October 2000) was a Congolese Catholic prelate who was the Archbishop of the Metropolitan Ecclesiastical Province of Bukavu in the Democratic Republic of the Congo from 3 March 1997 until his death on 4 October 2000. Before that, from 17 May 1966 until he was appointed archbishop, he was the Bishop of the Roman Catholic Diocese of Butembo-Beni. He was appointed bishop by Pope Paul VI. He was consecrated as bishop and installed at Butembo, Democratic Congo on 11 October 1966. On 3 March 1997, The Holy Father transferred him to Bukavu and appointed him archbishop there. Archbishop Emmanuel Kataliko of Bukavu died on 4 April 2000, while in office.

== Background and priesthood ==
Emmanuel Kataliko was born in 1932 in Lubero Territory, North Kivu, Democratic Republic of the Congo. He studied philosophy and theology at seminary. He was ordained a priest of the Roman Catholic Diocese of Butembo-Beni on 20 December 1958. He served as a priest until 17 May 1966.

== Bishop ==
Pope Paul VI appointed him Bishop of the Roman Catholic Diocese of Butembo-Beni on 17 May 1966. He was consecrated and installed at Butembo on 11 October 1966. The Principal Consecrator was Bishop Henri Joseph Marius Piérard, Titular Bishop of Molicunza assisted by Bishop Gabriel Ukec, Bishop of Bunia and Bishop Joseph Mikararanga Busimba, Bishop of Goma.

On 3 March 1997 The Holy Father Pope John Paul II, transferred Bishop Emmanuel Kataliko to the Archdiocese of Bukavu and appointed him archbishop of that Metropolitan Ecclesiastical Province. He served in that capacity until he died on 4 October 2000 at the age of 68 years.

== See also ==
- Catholic Church in the Democratic Republic of the Congo

== Succession table ==
Catholic Church titles
| Preceded by Henri Joseph Marius Piérard (22 June 1934 - 17 May 1966) | Bishop of Butembo-Beni (17 May 1966 - 3 March 1997) | Succeeded by Melchisedec Sikuli Paluku (since 3 April 1998) |
| Preceded by Christophe Munzihirwa Mwene Ngabo (14 March 1995 - 29 October 1996) | Archbishop of Bukavu (3 March 1997 - 4 October 2000) | Succeeded by Charles Kambale Mbogha (13 March 2001 - 9 October 2005) |
