= Commission Diocésaine Justice et Paix =

Pastoral social action commission of the Catholic Church

- Formation: 19 February 2003; 23 years ago
- Founder: Roman Catholic Diocese of Uvira
- Founded at: Kalundu
- Type: NGO and nonprofit
- Headquarters: Kalundu, Uvira, South Kivu, Democratic Republic of the Congo
- Region served: Roman Catholicism
- Services: Human rights education, conflict mediation, legal and psychosocial support for survivors of sexual violence, civic education, and community awareness campaigns.
- Official language: French
- Owner: Roman Catholic Diocese of Uvira

The Commission Diocésaine Justice et Paix (CDJP-Uvira), or Diocesan Commission for Justice and Peace in English, is a pastoral body of the Roman Catholic Diocese of Uvira, located in Kalundu, Uvira, in the South Kivu province of eastern Democratic Republic of the Congo. Founded on 19 February 2003, the commission works to protect human rights, support reconciliation, and building sustainable peace across the region. The commission works through 18 parishes within the diocese and helps different members of society understand their role in advancing peace and justice.

== History ==
The Commission Diocésaine Justice et Paix (CDJP-Uvira) was founded on 19 February 2003 to address widespread human rights abuses and social injustice in the Diocese of Uvira. Its creation followed a careful review of the worsening human rights situation. The ongoing Kivu conflict, the lack of trusted human rights organizations, and limited knowledge of basic rights, freedoms, and civic responsibilities among residents and public authorities had made the situation worse. Since then, the commission has focused strongly on training people to promote human rights.

== Activities ==
CDJP-Uvira runs several programs to help communities take action and promote peace and justice. These include:

Activity	Description
Training initiatives	Conducts training sessions for parish leaders, local influencers, political and administrative authorities, ethnic group representatives, and religious leaders in Uvira, Fizi, and Mwenga Territories. Topics include human rights, civic and electoral education, conflict resolution, and legal systems.
Conflict observation and reporting	Monitors, documents, and reports human rights violations to promote accountability and transparency.
Community mediation	Facilitates grassroots reconciliation through mediation and conflict resolution initiatives.
Radio program: Haki na Amani kwa Wote	Hosts an educational program on RTNC-Uvira to inform the public about justice, peacebuilding, and civic responsibilities.
Advocacy for vulnerable groups	Leads campaigns to defend children's rights and prevent violence against women.
Support for survivors of sexual violence	Provides psychosocial, legal, and medical support to victims, and facilitates their socio-economic reintegration.

=== Sexual violence ===
CDJP-Uvira works with communities, supports survivors, and speaks up for their legal rights as part of its response to sexual violence. It also trains traditional chiefs, religious leaders, and other community figures to help them challenge harmful customs and reject all forms of sexual abuse.

CDJP-Uvira runs Bureaux d'Écoute (Listening Offices) in parishes such as Baraka, Kiliba, and Kamituga. These offices offer safe, private spaces where survivors of sexual violence can share their experiences, receive support, and get help with their recovery. Trained psychosocial workers provide early support for trauma, psychological care, and referrals to partner health centers for medical treatment. Survivors may also receive help through Activités Génératrices de Revenus (AGR), or income-generating activities, to earn a living and take part in community life again.

Qualified psychologists train and supervise the workers, who are selected for their understanding, patience, respect for privacy, and ability to speak with people without judging them. Their work also takes them to remote villages, where they explain what the law says about sexual violence and encourage survivors to come forward. Such efforts, as Don Morgan Mubengwa Mukokya noted in his 2014 study, have led more survivors to report those responsible and helped more people recognize sexual violence as a form of social injustice.

A network of trained volunteers helps CDJP-Uvira carry out prevention campaigns and education programs. The organization also created three synergies des mamans, or women's advocacy groups, in Uvira, Baraka, and Kamituga to increase women's involvement in these efforts. The groups teach people about HIV/AIDS and violence against women while encouraging mutual support and helping women take an active role in improving their communities. CDJP-Uvira receives support for its efforts to combat sexual violence from international partners such as the Scottish Catholic International Aid Fund (SCIAF) and Mensen met een Missie (MM).
