= Our Lady of Peace Cathedral, Bukavu =

Coordinates: 2.5017°S 28.8594°E

Our Lady of Peace Cathedral
- Cathédrale Notre-Dame de la Paix de Bukavu
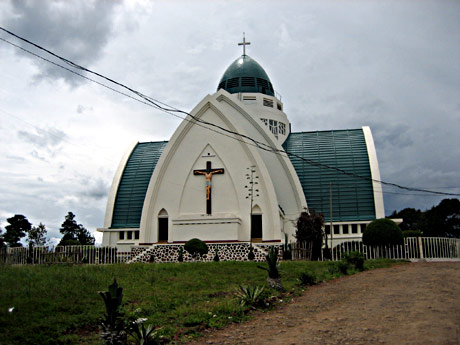
- Our Lady of Peace Cathedral
- Location: Bukavu
- Country: Democratic Republic of the Congo
- Denomination: Roman Catholic Church

The Our Lady of Peace Cathedral (French: Cathédrale Notre-Dame de la Paix de Bukavu) or simply Cathedral of Bukavu, is a religious building of the Catholic Church which is located in the city of Bukavu in the east end of the African country of the Democratic Republic of the Congo, specifically in the province of South Kivu.

== History ==
The cathedral was built from 1948 to 1951, and its formal consecration took place on 18 October 1951. It follows the Roman or Latin rite and serves as the headquarters of the Metropolitan Archdiocese of Bukavu (Archidioecesis Bukavuensis), which was created in 1959 by the bull "Cum parvulum" by Pope John XXIII. It is under the pastoral responsibility of Archbishop François-Xavier Maroy Rusengo.

== See also ==
- Roman Catholicism in the Democratic Republic of the Congo
- Our Lady of Peace Cathedral
