= Diocese of Uvira =

Roman Catholic diocese in the Democratic Republic of the Congo

Diocese of Uvira Dioecesis Uviraensis
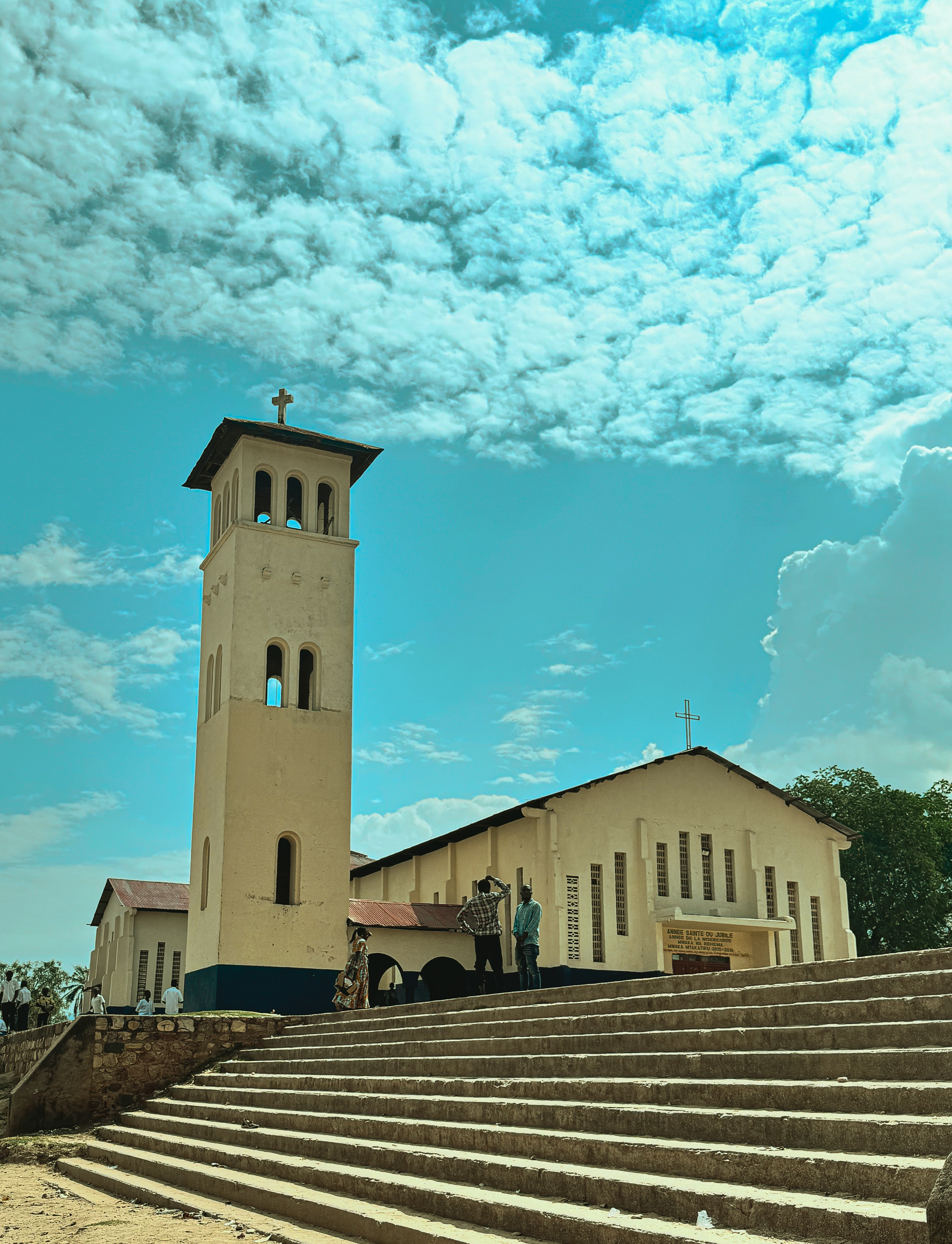
- Cathédrale Saint-Paul d'Uvira

Location
- Country: Democratic Republic of the Congo
- Territory: Uvira, Fizi, and Mwenga in South Kivu Province, as well as parts of Walungu (in South Kivu) and Kabambare (in Maniema Province)
- Metropolitan: Bukavu
- Headquarters: Uvira, South Kivu, Democratic Republic of the Congo

Statistics
- Area: 36,000 km^{2} (14,000 sq mi)
- Population: Total; Catholics: (as of 2014); 1,503,800; 486,921 (32.4%)
- Parishes: 18

Information
- Denomination: Roman Catholic
- Rite: Latin Rite
- Established: 16 April 1962; 64 years ago
- Cathedral: Cathédrale Saint-Paul d'Uvira

Current leadership
- Pope: Leo XIV
- Bishop: Sébastien-Joseph Muyengo Mulombe

The Roman Catholic Diocese of Uvira (Latin: Uviraën(sis)) is an ecclesiastical jurisdiction of the Roman Catholic Church located in the South Kivu province of the Democratic Republic of the Congo. Established on 16 April 1962, the diocese encompasses the pastoral zones of Uvira Territory, Fizi Territory, and Mwenga Territory, and it partially includes the territories of Walungu Territory and Kabambare Territory. It is part of the Ecclesiastical Province of Bukavu.

== Location and history ==
The Diocese of Uvira covers approximately 36,000 square kilometers, with a population of around 1.5 million people as of 2014. Nearly 500,000 residents are Roman Catholics. The diocese includes diverse landscapes, such as mountains, plateaus, and the lowlands of the Ruzizi Valley near Lake Tanganyika.

The diocese was created from parts of neighboring dioceses and territories to serve the growing Catholic population in South Kivu. It has contributed to the religious, educational, and social development of the region.

== Bishops ==
Bishops of Uvira (Latin Rite)

| Name | Tenure | Detail |
|---|---|---|
| Danilo Catarzi | 16 April 1962–26 March 1981 | |
| Léonard Dhejju | 26 March 1981–2 July 1984 | Appointed Bishop of Bunia |
| Jérôme Gapangwa Nteziryayo | 1 July 1985–1998 | |
| Jean-Pierre Tafunga Mbayo | 1998–2008 | |
| Sede vacante | 1 August 2008–14 October 2013 | |
| Sébastien-Joseph Muyengo Mulombe | Since 15 October 2013 | |

== Organization ==
The diocese is administered by the Episcopal Curia, which handles administrative and pastoral affairs. It is led by Apostolic Administrator Mgr. François-Xavier Maroy Rusengo, who serves in place of a resident bishop. He is assisted by senior diocesan officials, including the Vicar General, Chancellor, and Economist General.

The diocesan personnel includes clergy and religious members, including 69 diocesan priests, 20 male religious (brothers), and 76 female religious (sisters), who serve in pastoral, educational, and social roles. The General Finance Office (Économat Général) manages the diocese's financial affairs. For priestly formation, the diocese operates the Spiritual Propedeutic Seminary Saint-Pierre Claver of Kiringye (Propédeutique spirituelle Saint-Pierre Claver de Kiringye), founded in 1992 to trains candidates for the priesthood. The diocese also operates the Bethany Rehabilitation Center for the Disabled (Centre Béthanie de réhabilitation pour handicapés), which helps people with disabilities, and the Caritas Medical Center, which provides healthcare services to disadvantaged groups. The Catechetical Center in Kavimvira provides religious instruction, while the Formation Center for Lay Collaborators in Kamituga trains laypeople for pastoral work.

The diocese consists of 18 parishes and has a cathedral as its main church. It also operates 281 educational institutions and 31 charitable institutions across its territory.

The diocese is divided into three pastoral zones:

| Pastoral Zone | Parish and location | Year founded | Notable institutions and services |
|---|---|---|---|
| Zone Pastorale de la Plaine de la Ruzizi (Uvira) | Uvira (Saint-Paul Cathedral) | 1933 | Diocesan pharmacy, health center, cultural center Baeza la Parokia |
| | Kavimvira | – | Site of the Marian sanctuary and a reference health center |
| | Kiliba (Saint-Joseph Ouvrier) | 1959 | It has a pharmacy and a health center |
| | Luvungi (Sainte-Famille) | 1967 | Includes a garage, social center, and health reference center |
| | Mulenge-Kidote (Saints Martyrs Baganda) | 1963 | Includes a social center |
| Zone Pastorale de Fizi | Fizi (Saint-Jean-Baptiste) | 1962 | Multiple social centers |
| | Baraka (Cœur Immaculé de Marie) | 1948 | Dispensary, social services |
| | Mboko (Saint-Pierre Apôtre) | 1973 | Nutritional center, dispensary |
| | Nakiliza (Saint-Michel Archange) | 1955 | – |
| Zone Pastorale de Mwenga | Mwenga (Sainte-Marie) | 1959 | Social center, reference health center |
| | Saint-Hilaire | 1928 | Petit Séminaire Notre-Dame d’Afrique (Seminary) |
| | Kamituga (Saint-François Xavier) | 1948 | Training center for laity, services for the disabled |
| | Kitutu (Saint-Esprit) | 1967 | Social center, reference health center |
| | Kasiba (Saint-Mukasa) | 1972 | – |
| | Minembwe (under Fizi zone) | 1992 | – |

Congregations of religious women

| Congregation | Location(s) of service |
|---|---|
| Sœurs Filles de Marie Reine des Apôtres (Bukavu) | Uvira |
| Sœurs Filles de la Résurrection (Bukavu) | Kasika |
| Sœurs Benebikira (Rwanda) | Uvira |
| Sœurs Missionnaires de Marie (Xaverian Sisters) | Uvira, Luvungi, Kamituga, Nakiliza |
| Sœurs de la Compagnie de Marie Notre-Dame | Mboko |
| Sœurs Missionnaires de Sainte Gemma | Kavimvira, Mwenga |
| Sœurs de Saint Joseph de Turin | Uvira, Baraka, Sange |
| Sœurs Piccole Figlie dei Sacri Cuori di Gesù e Maria | Fizi, Uvira |
| Sœurs Franciscaines de Notre Seigneur del Monte | Kidote |
| Sœurs Clarisses | Uvira |

== See also ==
- Roman Catholicism in the Democratic Republic of the Congo
