= Dieudonné Uringi Uuci =

Burkinabe Catholic prelate (born 1957)

The Most Reverend Dieudonné Uringi Uuci
- Bishop of Bunia, Democratic Republic of the Congo
- Church: Catholic Church
- Archdiocese: Roman Catholic Archdiocese of Kisangani
- See: Roman Catholic Diocese of Bunia
- Appointed: 1 April 2005
- Installed: 24 June 2005
- Predecessor: Léonard Dhejju
- Successor: Incumbent

Orders
- Ordination: 25 September 1984
- Consecration: 24 June 2005 by Laurent Monsengwo Pasinya
- Rank: Bishop

Personal details
- Born: Dieudonné Uringi Uuci; 28 October 1957 (age 68) Bunia, Diocese of Bunia, Ituri Province, DR Congo

Styles of Dieudonné Uringi Uuci
- Reference style: Your Lordship; The Most Reverend
- Spoken style: His Lordship
- Religious style: Bishop

Dieudonné Uringi Uuci (born 28 September 1957) is a Congolese Catholic prelate who is the bishop of the Roman Catholic Diocese of Bunia, Democratic Republic of the Congo since 1st April 2005. Before that, from 25 September 1984 until 1 April 2005, he was a priest of the Catholic Diocese of Bunia. He was appointed bishop by Pope John Paul II. He was consecrated and installed at Bunia on 24 Jun 2005 by Archbishop Laurent Monsengwo Pasinya, Archbishop of Kisangani.

== Background and priesthood ==
He was born on 28 September 1957 in Bunia, Diocese of Bunia, Ituri Province, DR Congo. After studying philosophy and theology at seminary, he was ordained a priest of the Roman Catholic Diocese of Bunia on 25 September 1984. He served as a priest until 1 April 2005.

== As bishop ==
Pope John Paul II appointed him as bishop of the Roman Catholic Diocese of Bunia on 1 April 2005. He was consecrated and installed at Bunia on 24 June 2005 by the hands of Archbishop Laurent Monsengwo Pasinya, Archbishop of Kisangani assisted by Archbishop Giovanni d'Aniello, Titular Archbishop of Pesto and Bishop Joseph Banga Bane, Bishop of Buta. He the Local Ordinary at Bunia as of December 2024.

In September 2024, Bishop Dieudonné Uringi Uuci closed to churches in the Diocese of Ituri following the desecration of the two premises by rebels belonging to militia group CODECO. Bishop Uringi also decided to recall the priests working in the two parishes. A penitential rite will have to be carried out at each of the two premises before the churches can re-open for public worship.

In July 2025 the bishop accused local authorities of inaction following the massacre of dozens of youths during a vigil in the Church of Komanda. "The police and the military were not far away, but they did not act in time. They should have intervened more quickly to protect the population”, he told Aid to the Church in Need.

== See also ==
- Catholic Church in the Democratic Republic of the Congo

== Succession table ==
Catholic Church titles
Preceded by Léonard Dhejju (2 July 1984 - 6 April 2002)	Bishop of Bunia (since 1 April 2005)	Succeeded by Incumbent
