= Melchisedec Sikuli Paluku =

Congolese Catholic prelate (born 1952)

The Most Reverend Melchisedec Sikuli Paluku
- Bishop of Butembo-Beni, Democratic Republic of the Congo
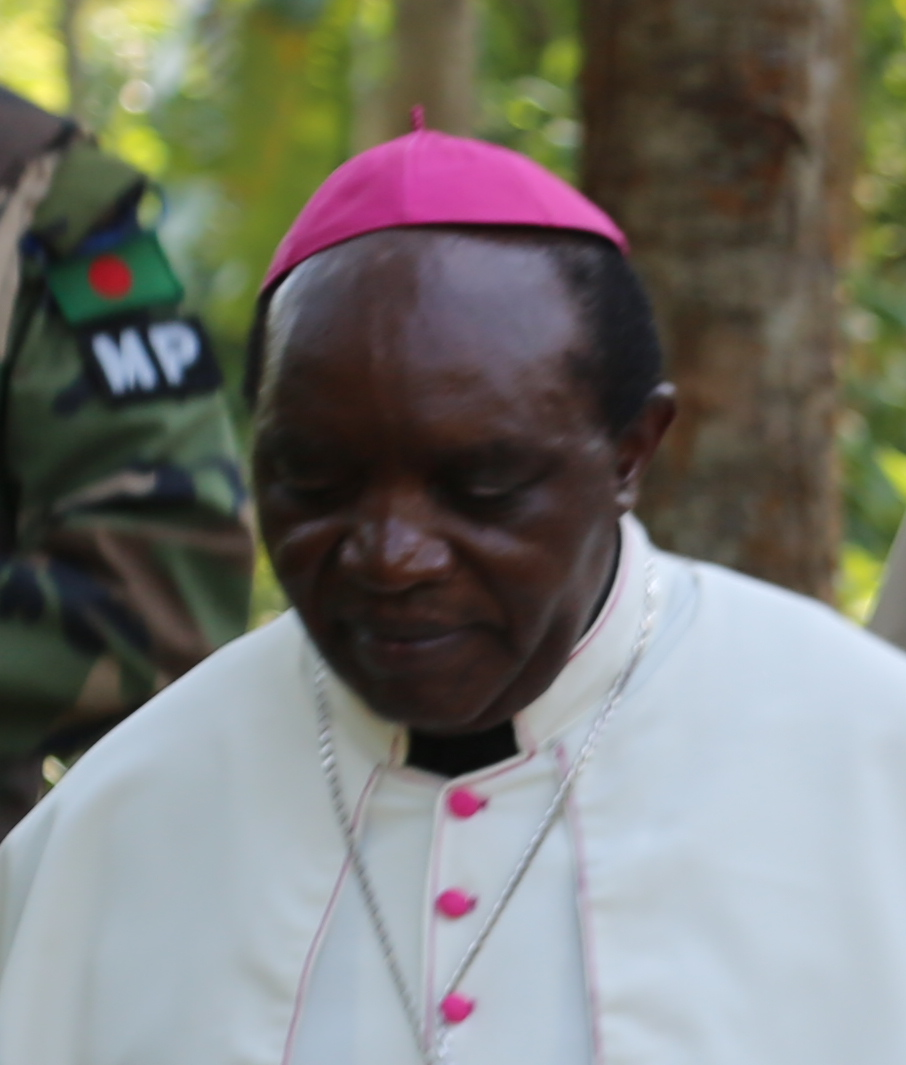
- Church: Catholic Church
- Archdiocese: Roman Catholic Archdiocese of Bukavu
- See: Roman Catholic Diocese of Butembo-Beni
- Appointed: 3 April 1998
- Installed: 2 August 1998
- Predecessor: Emmanuel Kataliko
- Successor: Incumbent

Orders
- Ordination: 21 August 1978
- Consecration: 2 August 1998 by Cardinal Fiorenzo Angelini
- Rank: Bishop

Personal details
- Born: Melchisedec Sikuli Paluku; 27 January 1952 (age 74) Lukanga, Democratic Republic of the Congo

Styles of Melchisedec Sikuli Paluku
- Reference style: Your Lordship; The Most Reverend
- Spoken style: His Lordship
- Religious style: Bishop

Melchisedec Sikuli Paluku (born 27 January 1952) is a Congolese Catholic prelate who is the bishop of the Roman Catholic Diocese of Butembo-Beni in the Democratic Republic of the Congo since 3 April 1998. Before that, from 21 August 1978 until he was appointed bishop, he was a priest of that same Roman Catholic diocese. He was appointed bishop on 3 April 1998 by Pope John Paul II. He was consecrated and installed at Butembo/Beni on 2 August 1998.

== Background and priesthood ==
He was born on 27 January 1952 in Lukanga, Diocese of Butembo-Beni, North Kivu, in the DR Congo. He studied philosophy and theology at seminary. He was ordained a priest of the Roman Catholic Diocese of Butembo-Beni on 21 August 1978. He served as priest until 3 April 1998.

== Bishop ==
On 3 April 1998, The Holy Father Pope John Paul II appointed him bishop of the diocese of Butembo-Beni. He was consecrated and installed at Butembo-Beni on 2 August 1998 by the hands of Cardinal Fiorenzo Angelini, Cardinal-Deacon of Santo Spirito in Sassia, assisted by Archbishop Emmanuel Kataliko, Archbishop of Bukavu and Archbishop Faustino Sainz Muñoz, Titular Archbishop of Novaliciana.

In 2023, the Diocese of Butembo-Beni, together with Bishop Melchisedec Sikuli Paluku celebrated his 25th year (Silver Jubilee) as bishop. The ceremony held in Butembo was presided over by Cardinal Fridolin Ambongo Besungu, Metropolitan Archbishop of Kinshasa.

The bishop has taken a firm stance against the ongoing violence in the area covered by his diocese, publishing a statement in June 2024 lamenting the killings “of a peaceful population, left without defence and without security”, the abduction of persons “without a single trace of any of them” and the rape of girls and women. He called on government authorities "to end the Calvary of the Congolese people in general, and the population of the Diocese of Butembo-Beni in particular, a Calvary which has lasted too long in this martyred region".

The bishop spoke out again in September 2025 following a massacre in Ntoyo, allegedly carried out by the ADF. "To all the families affected by this umpteenth and horrible carnage and to all the faithful of the parish, we express our spiritual closeness. May God, the Master of Life, strengthen us through the intercession of the Blessed Virgin Mary, consoler of the afflicted, and lead us beyond the desert of present-day suffering to lasting peace".

== See also ==
- Catholic Church in the Democratic Republic of the Congo

== Succession table ==
Preceded by Emmanuel Kataliko (17 May 1966 - 3 May 1997)	Bishop of Butembo-Beni (since 3 April 1998)	Succeeded by (Incumbent)
