= Léonard Dhejju =

Congolese Roman Catholic bishop (1931–2019)

- Bishop of Bunia
- Church: Catholic Church
- Diocese: Diocese of Bunia
- In office: 2 July 1984 – 6 April 2002
- Predecessor: Gabriel Ukec
- Successor: Dieudonné Uringi Uuci
- Previous post: Bishop of Uvira (1981-1984)

Orders
- Ordination: 23 August 1959
- Consecration: 19 July 1981 by Aloys Mulindwa Mutabesha Mugoma Mweru

Personal details
- Born: 14 March 1931 Dele (southeast of Bunia), Orientale Province, Belgian Congo, Belgian Empire
- Died: 4 June 2019 (aged 88) Bunia, Ituri Province, Democratic Republic of the Congo

Léonard Dhejju (14 March 1931 – 4 June 2019) was a Congolese Roman Catholic bishop.

Dhejju was born in the Democratic Republic of the Congo and was ordained to the priesthood in 1959. He served as bishop of the Roman Catholic Diocese of Uvira from 1981 to 1984. Dhejju then served as bishop of the Roman Catholic Diocese of Bunia from 1984 to 2002.
