= COOPEC–Kalundu =

Cooperative bank and microfinance institution in Uvira, South Kivu

- Company type: Cooperative (member-owned)
- Industry: Microfinance
- Founded: 21 February 1988; 38 years ago
- Founder: Grassroots initiative
- Headquarters: Songo, Alpha Avenue, Kalundu, Uvira, South Kivu, Democratic Republic of the Congo
- Area served: Uvira
- Products: Credit microcredit savings accounts social support services

COOPEC–Kalundu (French: Coopérative d'Épargne et de Crédit de Kalundu) is a rural financial cooperative located in the Songo quartier, along Alpha Avenue in Kalundu, Uvira, in South Kivu, eastern Democratic Republic of the Congo. The cooperative is bordered to the east by Lake Tanganyika, to the west by the Mitumba Mountains, to the north by the thermal waters of Kavimvira, and to the south by the Ruzozi River.

Established on 21 February 1988, the cooperative was created to promote financial inclusion among low-income populations, particularly rural farmers and women, by offering accessible credit and savings services aimed at reducing poverty and supporting community development.

== History ==
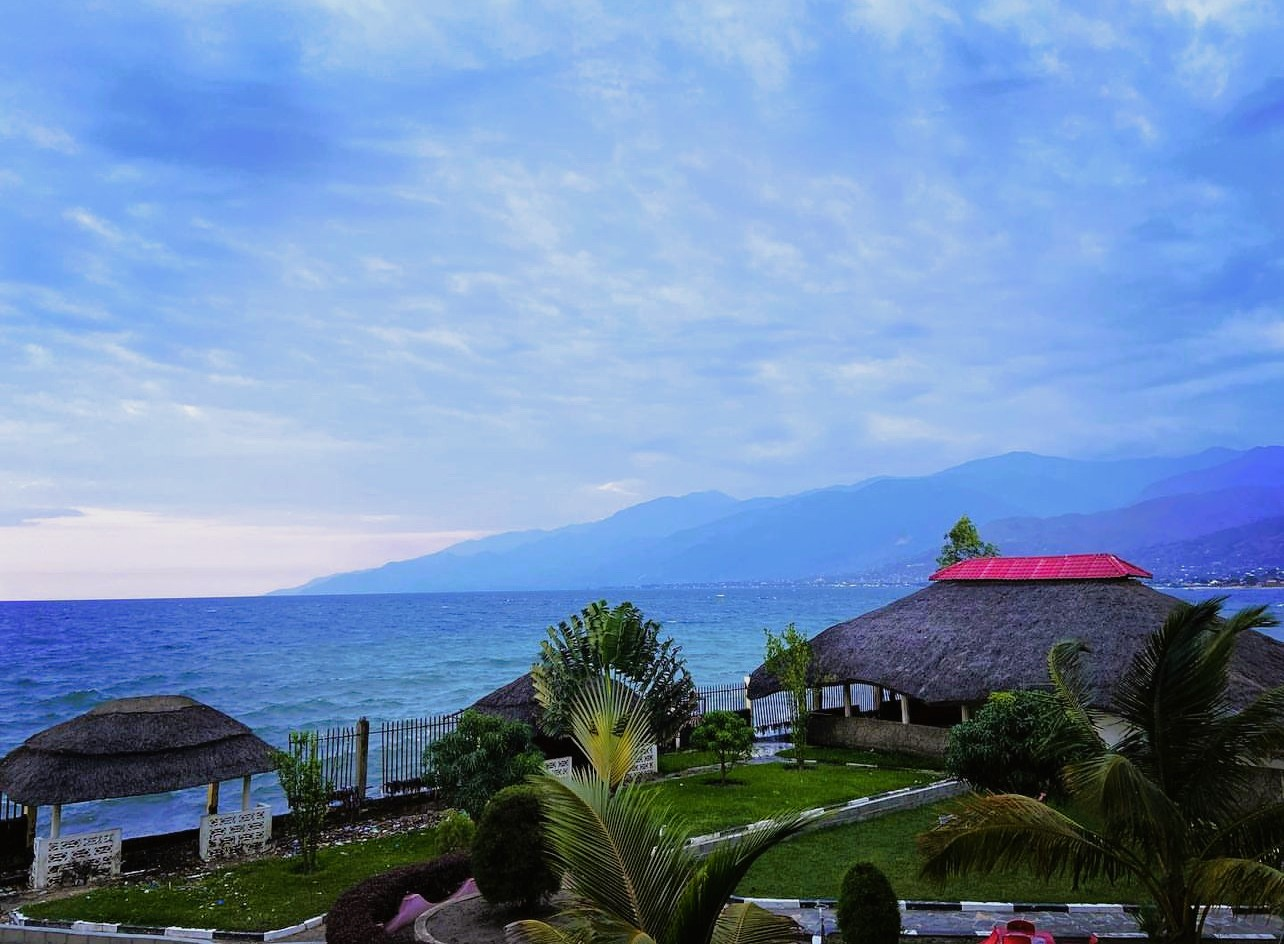
A scene from Uvira, the city where community members came together to create COOPEC–Kalundu.

COOPEC–Kalundu was founded on 21 February 1988 in response to the financial exclusion faced by the rural poor of Kalundu. These populations lacked access to conventional banking services, which hindered their ability to invest in income-generating activities such as agriculture, small-scale trade, healthcare expenses, and children's education. The cooperative was established with the objective of filling this gap through grassroots financial intermediation.

During its initial operational phase (1988–1995), COOPEC–Kalundu initiated a modest credit program characterized by limited services, predominantly directed toward individual male clients. Prospective borrowers were subject to a six-month waiting period and stringent eligibility requirements, including elevated interest rates, full collateralization, proof of personal savings amounting to 10% of the loan value, and homeownership. These rigid conditions rendered the program largely inaccessible to the most impoverished households.

By 25 October 1996, COOPEC–Kalundu had accumulated $66,000 in member deposits, with $57,000 disbursed in active loans. However, a series of political and military crises during the First and Second Congo Wars severely disrupted operations, leading to asset losses from widespread looting and culminating in the destruction of the cooperative's headquarters on 12 December 1996. Reconstruction efforts were made possible through financial support from the Rabobank Foundation, which facilitated the rehabilitation of the COOPEC–Kalundu's infrastructure and services. Further support from Oxfam Novib, aimed at implementing a microcredit program for low-income populations, enabled the cooperative to resume service delivery in October 2000.

After resuming operations in 2000, COOPEC–Kalundu implemented a reformed and more inclusive credit strategy that emphasized educational outreach and support for vulnerable groups, especially women in Uvira. It adopted group lending approaches, reduced interest rates, and offered flexible collateral arrangements.

== Activities ==
=== Objectives and credit conditions ===
The principal mission of COOPEC–Kalundu is to combat rural poverty by providing sustainable financial and non-financial services to disadvantaged populations. Special attention is given to vulnerable women. Beyond microcredit, the cooperative supports broader socioeconomic development goals, such as financial literacy, health education, family planning, and social assistance to at-risk individuals, including orphans and the elderly. According to its official documentation, COOPEC–Kalundu offers two types of loans: individual loans and group loans.

- Interest rates: Individual loans are subject to a 2% monthly interest rate, while group loans carry a 3% rate.
- Repayment structure: Loan capital is repaid quarterly; interest payments are made monthly. Processing fees total 0.5% of the loan capital.
- Collateral: Individual borrowers must provide collateral equivalent to 10% of the loan value. For group loans, collective guarantees (caution solidaire) are acceptable. Eligible collateral includes salary slips, harvest yields, jewelry, equipment, or movable property.

=== Savings services and areas of intervention ===
Members may open two types of savings accounts:

- Demand Deposit Account (Compte à vue): Offers free management with no service fees.
- Term Deposit Account (Compte à terme): Offers fixed-term deposits renewable every 6 or 12 months. Interest is paid quarterly and varies between 2% and 5% depending on local conditions and currency (notably U.S. dollars or Congolese francs).

Withdrawals on term deposits are only permitted at maturity unless exceptional approval is granted. Deposits can be transferred between branches under standard terms.

The cooperative functions in two core areas: financial services and social outreach. In terms of financial intermediation, COOPEC–Kalundu focuses on mobilizing savings, issuing loans, and distributing funds, striving to outperform conventional banks by tailoring its services to the unique economic conditions of the local community. Alongside its financial mission, the cooperative also provides social services, which encompass educational campaigns on credit management, health, nutrition, and family planning, as well as direct support to vulnerable populations.

== Operational statistics ==
As of 2017 internal study, COOPEC–Kalundu counted 32,704 members, distributed as follows:

Activity	Number
Male savers	21,026
Female savers	8,083
Male borrowers	2,586
Female borrowers	1,009
Total	32,704

== Partnerships and networks ==
COOPEC–Kalundu has received technical and financial support from multiple development partners:

Development partner	Location (if available)
UNHCR/Uvira	Uvira, DRC
PAM/Uvira	Uvira, DRC
Caritas Catholica Belgica	Brussels, Belgium
Rabobank Foundation	Utrecht, Netherlands
FIDA	Rome, Italy
ADA (Appui au Développement Autonome)	Luxembourg
INAFI	Nairobi, Kenya
Oxfam Novib	The Hague, Netherlands
FECETBU	—
Fraternité Saint Paul de Bujumbura	Bujumbura, Burundi

It is also affiliated with several financial networks:

Financial network	Location
COOCEC-Kivu	Bukavu, DRC
Bucong	Uvira, DRC
INAFI	Nairobi, Kenya
Microcredit Summit Campaign	Washington, D.C., USA
Microfinance Base	Dakar, Senegal

== Governance and organization ==
COOPEC–Kalundu is managed through a structured institutional framework:

Governing body/role
General Assembly (Assemblée Générale)
Board of Directors (Conseil d'Administration)
Credit Committee (Commission de Crédit)
Supervisory Board (Conseil de Surveillance)
Executive Director (Directeur Gérant)
Administrative and financial director
Loan and account officers
Treasurer, cashiers, and accountant
Internal auditor
IT manager
