= Tigamibena =

Tigamibena was an ancient city and bishopric in Roman Mauretania.

It was located in modern Algeria. It is now a Latin Catholic titular see.

== History ==
Tigamibena was one of many towns in the Roman province of Mauretania Caesariensis, important enough to become a suffragan of its capital Caesarea in Mauretania (now Cherchell), the Metropolitan Archbishopric. It faded, like most in Roman Africa.

== Titular see ==
The diocese was nominally restored in 1933 as Titular bishopric of Tigamibena (Latin and Curiate Italian), Latin adjective Tigamibenen(sis).

It has had the following incumbents, so far of the fitting Episcopal (lowest) rank :

- Benjamin Ibberson Webster (1968.03.12 – death 1981.01.18) as emeritate; previously Titular Bishop of Paphus (1946.09.24 – 1954.04.24) as Auxiliary Bishop of Toronto (Ontario, Canada) (1946.09.24 – 1954.04.24), then Bishop of Peterborough (Canada) (1954.04.24 – 1968.03.12)
- Patrick Kla Juwle (1972.07.30 – death 1973.08.18) as Apostolic Vicar of Cape Palmas (Liberia) (1972.07.30 – 1973.08.18)
- Bishop-elect Faustin Ngabu (1974.04.25 – 1974.09.07) as Coadjutor Bishop of Goma (Congo-Kinshasa) (1974.04.25 – 1974.09.07), succeeded as Bishop of Goma (1974.09.07 – 2010.03.18), also President of Association of Episcopal Conferences of Central Africa (1985 – 1990), President of National Episcopal Conference of Congo (1992 – 2000)
- Edward Marian Frankowski (1989.02.16 – ...), first as Auxiliary Bishop of Przemyśl (Poland) (1989.02.16 – 1992.03.25), then as Auxiliary Bishop of Sandomierz (Poland) (1992.03.25 – 2012.10.06), finally as emeritate.

== See also ==
- List of Catholic dioceses in Algeria

== Sources and external links ==
- GCatholic - data for all sections
- Catholic-Hierarchy.org
