= Albert Onyembo Lomandjo =

Congolese Catholic bishop

Albert Onyembo Lomandjo C.S.Sp.
- Bishop of Kindu
- Church: Catholic Church
- Diocese: Diocese of Kindu
- In office: 17 May 1966 – 17 January 1978
- Predecessor: Jean Fryns
- Successor: Paul Mambe Mukanga

Orders
- Ordination: 27 July 1958
- Consecration: 11 December 1966 by Émile André Jean-Marie Maury

Personal details
- Born: 6 July 1931 Kindu, Orientale Province, Belgian Congo, Belgian Empire
- Died: 11 January 2016 (aged 84)

Albert Onyembo Lomandjo (6 July 1931 – 11 January 2016) was a Roman Catholic bishop.

Ordained to the priesthood in 1958, Onyembo Lomandjo was appointed bishop of the Roman Catholic Diocese of Kindu, Democratic Republic of the Congo in 1966 resigning in 1978.
