= Diocese of Butembo-Beni =

Roman Catholic diocese in the Democratic Republic of the Congo

Coordinates: 0.1291°N 29.2886°E

Diocese of Butembo-Beni Dioecesis Butembensis-Benensis

Location
- Country: Democratic Republic of Congo
- Metropolitan: Bukavu

Statistics
- Area: 45,000 km^{2} (17,000 sq mi)
- Population: Total; Catholics: (as of 2006); 1,463,000; 993,000 (67.9%)

Information
- Rite: Latin Rite

Current leadership
- Pope: Leo XIV
- Bishop: Melchisedec Sikuli Paluku

The Roman Catholic Diocese of Butembo-Beni (Latin: Butemben(sis) – Benen(sis)) is a diocese located in the cities of Butembo and Beni in the ecclesiastical province of Bukavu in the Democratic Republic of the Congo.

== History ==
- 9 April 1934: Established as Mission “sui iuris” of Beni in Belgian Congo from the Apostolic Vicariate of Stanley Falls
- 9 February 1938: Promoted as Apostolic Vicariate of Beni in Belgian Congo
- 10 November 1959: Promoted as Diocese of Beni in Congo
- 7 July 1960: Renamed as Diocese of Beni
- 7 February 1967: Renamed as Diocese of Butembo-Beni

== Bishops ==
=== Ordinaries, in reverse chronological order ===
- Bishops of Butembo-Beni (Latin Rite)
  - Bishop Melchisedec Sikuli Paluku (since 3 April 1998)
  - Bishop Emmanuel Kataliko (17 May 1966 – 3 March 1997), appointed Archbishop of Bukavu
- Bishop of Beni (Latin Rite)
  - Bishop Henri Joseph Marius Piérard, A.A. (7 July 1960 – 17 May 1966); see below
- Bishop of Beni in Congo (Roman rite)
  - Bishop Henri Joseph Marius Piérard, A.A. (10 November 1959 – 7 July 1960); see above & below
- Vicar Apostolic of Beni in Belgian Congo (Roman rite)
  - Bishop Henri Joseph Marius Piérard, A.A. (9 February 1938 – 10 November 1959); see above & below
- Ecclesiastical Superior of Beni in Belgian Congo (Roman rite)
  - Father Henri Joseph Marius Piérard, A.A. (22 June 1934 – 9 February 1938); see above

=== Other priest of this diocese who became bishop ===
- Charles Kambale Mbogha, A.A. (priest here, 1969-1972), appointed Bishop of Wamba in 1990

== See also ==
- Roman Catholicism in the Democratic Republic of the Congo

== Sources ==
- GCatholic.org
- Catholic Hierarchy
