= Roman Catholic Diocese of Kindu =

Roman Catholic diocese in the Democratic Republic of the Congo

Diocese of Kindu Dioecesis Kinduensis

Location
- Country: Democratic Republic of the Congo
- Metropolitan: Bukavu

Statistics
- Area: 82,883 km^{2} (32,001 sq mi)
- Population: Total; Catholics: (as of 2003); 437,620; 171,070 (39.1%)

Information
- Rite: Latin Rite

Current leadership
- Pope: Leo XIV
- Bishop: François Abeli Muhoya Mutchapa
- Bishops emeritus: Willy Ngumbi Ngengele

The Roman Catholic Diocese of Kindu (Latin: Kinduen(sis)) is a diocese located in the cities of Kindu in the ecclesiastical province of Bukavu in the Democratic Republic of the Congo.

== History ==
- 23 April 1956: Established as Apostolic Vicariate of Kindu from the Apostolic Vicariate of Kongolo and the Apostolic Vicariate of Stanley-ville
- 10 November 1959: Promoted as Diocese of Kindu

== Leadership, in reverse chronological order ==
- Bishops of Kindu (Latin Rite)
  - Bishop François Abeli Muhoya Mutchapa (18 November 2020 – Present)
  - Bishop Willy Ngumbi Ngengele, M. Afr. (25 April 2007 – 23 April 2019), appointed Bishop of Goma
  - Bishop Paul Mambe Mukanga (15 March 1979 – 26 January 2004)
  - Bishop Albert Onyembo Lomandjo, C.S.Sp. (17 May 1966 – 17 January 1978)
  - Bishop Jean Fryns, C.S.Sp. (10 November 1959 – 2 July 1965); see below
- Vicars Apostolic of Kindu (Latin Rite)
  - Bishop Jean Fryns, C.S.Sp. (12 April 1957 – 10 November 1959); see above

== See also ==
- Roman Catholicism in the Democratic Republic of the Congo

== Sources ==
- GCatholic.org
- Catholic Hierarchy
