= Diocese of Kasongo =

Roman Catholic diocese in the Democratic Republic of the Congo

Diocese of Kasongo Dioecesis Kasongoensis

Location
- Country: Democratic Republic of the Congo
- Metropolitan: Bukavu

Statistics
- Area: 75,365 km^{2} (29,099 sq mi)
- Population: Total; Catholics: (as of 2004); 900,000; 230,000 (25.6%)

Information
- Rite: Latin Rite

Current leadership
- Pope: Leo XIV
- Bishop: Placide Lubamba Ndjibu, M.Afr.

The Roman Catholic Diocese of Kasongo (Latin: Kasongoën(sis)) is a diocese located in the cities of Kasongo in the ecclesiastical province of Bukavu in the Democratic Republic of the Congo.

== History ==
- 10 January 1952: Established as Apostolic Vicariate of Kasongo from the Apostolic Vicariate of Baudouinville and the Apostolic Vicariate of Kivu
- 10 November 1959: Promoted as Diocese of Kasongo

== Bishops ==
=== Ordinaries, in reverse chronological order ===
- Bishops of Kasongo (Latin Rite), below
  - Bishop Placide Lumbamba Ndjibu, M.Afr. (since 11 March 2014)
  - Bishop Théophile Kaboy Ruboneka (2 November 1995 – 21 April 2009), appointed Coadjutor Bishop of Goma
  - Bishop Christophe Munzihirwa Mwene Ngabo, S.J. (30 April 1990 – 14 March 1995), appointed Archbishop of Bukavu
  - Bishop Timothée Pirigisha Mukombe (29 September 1966 – 30 April 1990)
  - Bishop Noël Mala (5 April 1963 – 31 July 1964)
  - Bishop Richard Cleire, M. Afr. (10 November 1959 – 5 April 1963); see below
- Vicar Apostolic of Kasongo (Latin Rite), below
  - Bishop Richard Cleire, M. Afr. (10 January 1952 – 10 November 1959); see above

=== Coadjutor bishop ===
- Christophe Munzihirwa Mwene Ngabo, S.J. (1986-1990)

== See also ==
- Roman Catholicism in the Democratic Republic of the Congo

== Sources ==
- GCatholic.org
- Catholic Hierarchy
