= Diocese of Bunia =

Roman Catholic diocese in the Democratic Republic of the Congo

Coordinates: 1.5603°N 30.2450°E

Diocese of Bunia Dioecesis Buniaensis
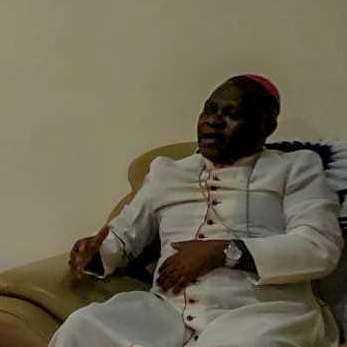
- Bishop Dieudonné Uringi Uuci

Location
- Country: Democratic Republic of Congo
- Metropolitan: Kisangani

Statistics
- Area: 22,470 km^{2} (8,680 sq mi)
- Population: Total; Catholics: (as of 2006); 710,226; 439,700 (61.9%)

Information
- Rite: Latin Rite

Current leadership
- Pope: Leo XIV
- Bishop: Dieudonné Uringi Uuci

The Roman Catholic Diocese of Bunia (Latin: Buniaën(sis)) is a diocese located in the city of Bunia in the ecclesiastical province of Kisangani in the Democratic Republic of the Congo. It was established on 10 November 1959. The diocese is home to Cathedral Notre-Dame des Grâces, in Bunia.

== History ==
The area first was established as the Apostolic Prefecture of Lake Albert from the Apostolic Vicariate of Stanley Falls and the Apostolic Vicariate of Uganda in Uganda on 27 June 1922. It was later promoted to an Apostolic Vicariate on 11 December 1933. On 10 November 1959, it was promoted once more to the Diocese of Bunia. The Diocese lost territory to establish the Diocese of Mahagi on 2 July 1962.

In 2024, two churches in the Ituri Province of the diocese were desecrated by a rebel group in search of money.

In the early hours of 27 July 2025 a massacre took place in Komanda, in the parish of Bienheureuse Anuarite, killing dozens of mostly young people who were participating in a vigil. The attack was carried out by the ADF according to local sources. According to Fr Marcelo Oliveira, a Portuguese Comboni missionary in the country, "the attack occurred at around 01:00 in the morning. The rebels entered the church and murdered a large number of children, both inside the church building and in the compound. We continue to pray for peace in this immense country and to ask for the grace of peace", he told Aid to the Church in Need. The bishop of Bunia accused the local authorities of inaction. "The police and the military were not far away, but they did not act in time. They should have intervened more quickly to protect the population”, he told ACN.

== Leadership ==
The current Bishop of Bunia (Latin Rite), is Bishop Dieudonné Uringi Uuci, having served since 1 April 2005. Prior to his appointment there had been a 3 year gap, with Bishop Léonard Dhejju, who was appointed 2 July 1984, having left the post on 6 April 2002. Bishop Gabriel Ukec was in the position for almost twenty years, serving between 29 September 1964 and 2 July 1984. Bishop Alphonse Joseph Matthijsen, M. Afr. saw the area through its multiple promotions. Appointed on 21 June 1922 as Father Matthijsen, he served as Prefect Apostolic until 11 December 1933, then as Vicar Apostolic until he was promoted to Bishop on 10 November 1959. He stepped down 19 August 1963.

== See also ==
- Roman Catholicism in the Democratic Republic of the Congo

== Sources ==
- GCatholic.org
- Catholic Hierarchy
