= Kalundu, Uvira =

Commune in Uvira, South Kivu

Kalundu
- Commune
- Commune de Kalundu
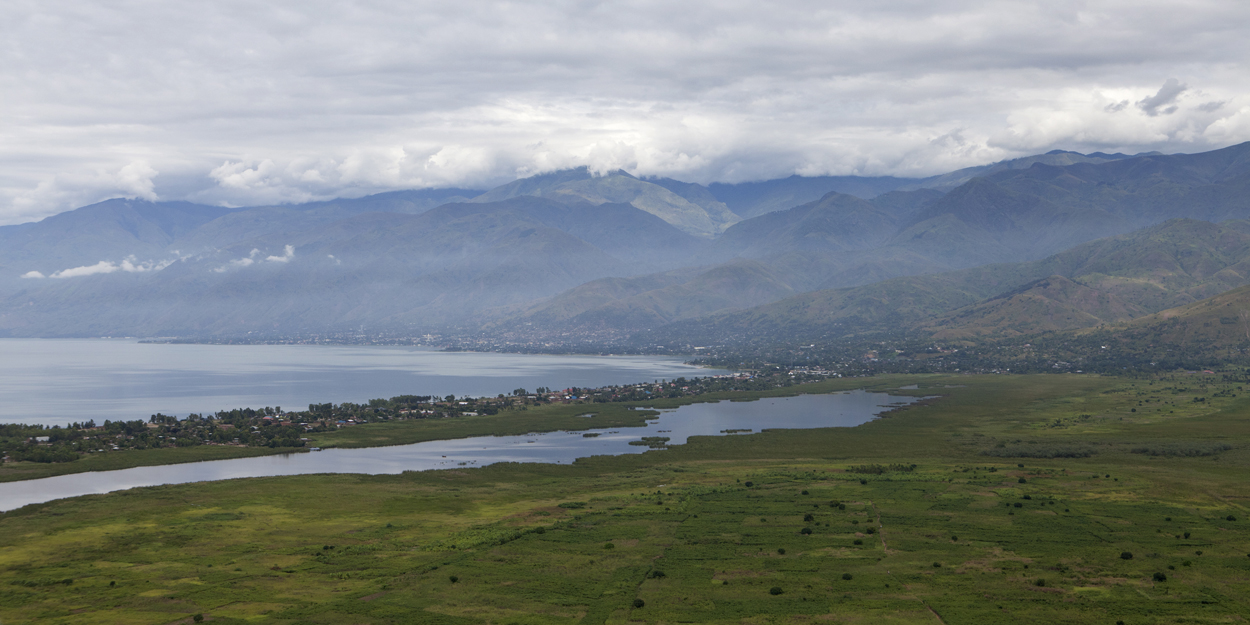
- A view of Uvira
- Country: Democratic Republic of the Congo
- Province: South Kivu
- City: Uvira

Area
  - Total: 40.5 km^{2} (15.6 sq mi)

Population (2021 est.)
  - Total: 110,561
- Official language: French
- National language: Swahili

Kalundu is one of the three communes of Uvira, situated in the South Kivu province in the eastern Democratic Republic of the Congo. Covering an area of approximately 40.5 square kilometers, Kalundu had an estimated population of 110,561 as of 2021. It is bordered by Kiliba-Kagando to the north, the Kambekulu River and Kigongo locality of the Bavira Chiefdom to the south, Lake Tanganyika to the east, and the Mitumba Mountains to the west. Often referred to as an administrative and coastal commune, Kalundu serves as a hub for local governance and is overseen by a mayor. The commune is subdivided into six quartiers (neighborhoods).

Kalundu is ethnically diverse, home to indigenous groups such as the Fuliru, Vira, Bembe, and Bashi, alongside residents from neighboring countries. The most commonly spoken languages include Kifuliru, Kijoba, Kivira, and Swahili, with secondary use of Mashi, Kibembe, and Kinyarwanda. The economy is driven by agriculture, carpentry, jewelry making, sculpture, textile work, shoemaking, painting, hairdressing, mechanical and electrical repair, small-scale catering, transportation, and trade. Alongside these sectors, Kalundu is developing a burgeoning financial sector with microfinance providers and banking institutions, in addition to being the site of the Port of Kalundu.

== Geography ==
=== Terrain and climate ===
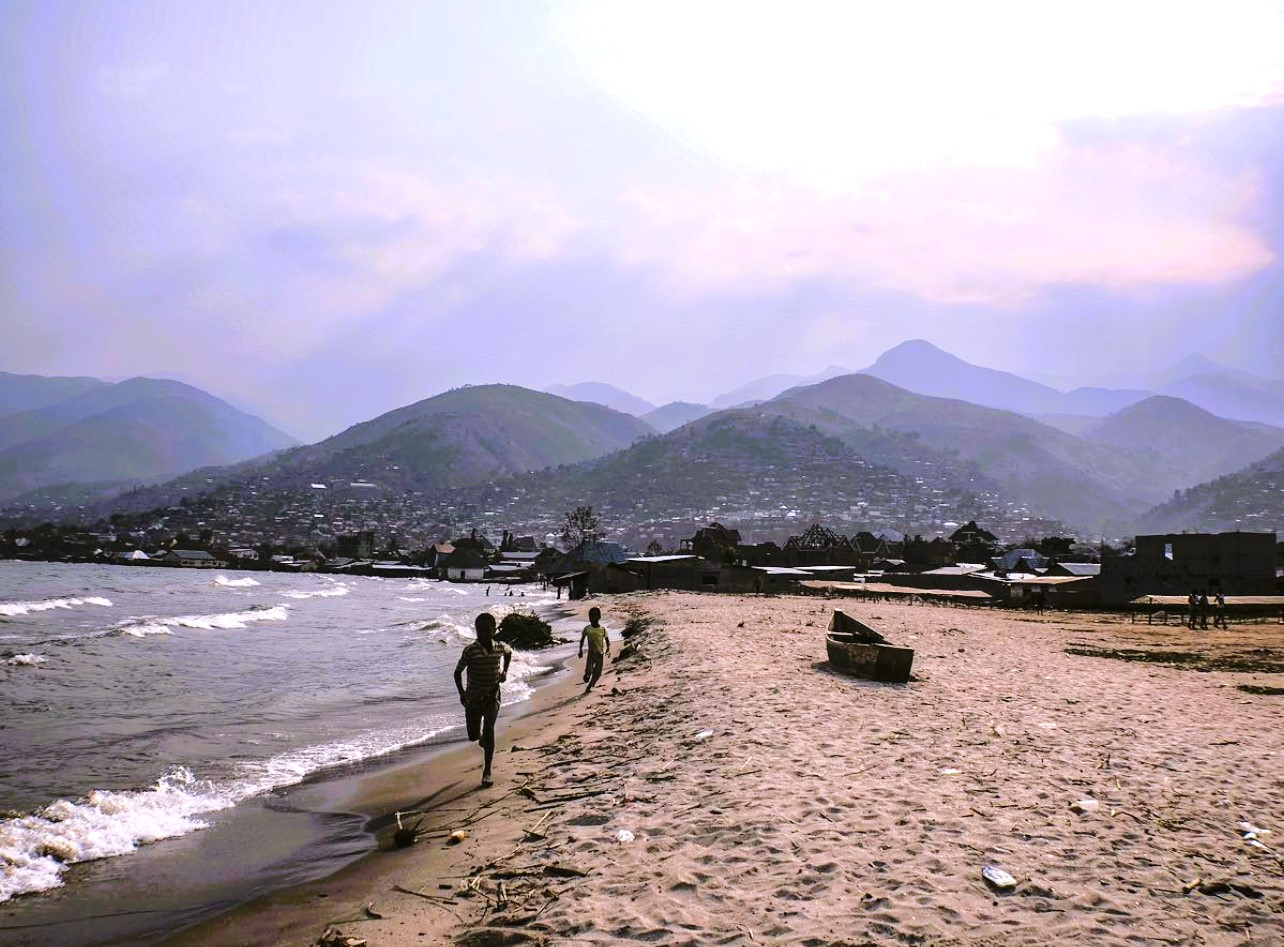
Lake Tanganyika in Uvira

The Kalundu's topography is characterized by predominantly flat terrain, with elevations ranging between 780 and 900 meters above sea level. This low-to-mid-altitude relief provides favorable conditions for agriculture, particularly for cultivating a wide range of crop species and trees. The commune features a diversity of soil types, including abundant clay soils in the upland areas and very rich alluvial soils in the lowlands. These alluvial deposits are believed by geologists to have been formed during the glacial and pluvial phases of the Quaternary period. Lake-derived alluvium occurs in two forms: terrace-forming sediments and those lining the bed of Lake Tanganyika. The sandy texture of these lake sediments limits their agricultural productivity.

Situated within the Lake Tanganyika watershed, Kalundu is part of a broader hydrological system encompassing several rivers and streams. The Kalimabenge River is the most prominent, accompanied by five secondary streams: Kabimba, Kakungwe, Zengeza, Ruzozi, and Kamongola, all of which flow into Lake Tanganyika. The natural vegetation in the area has been largely cleared due to human activity. In its place, artificial vegetation introduced during the colonial era now dominates, consisting mainly of eucalyptus, mango, avocado, and citrus trees (including orange, lemon, and mandarin).

Kalundu experiences a semi-arid, tropical climate. Seasonal and topographical variations influence temperature levels, which typically range from 20 °C to 30 °C in the plains and from 15 °C to 25 °C in the highlands. The area receives an average annual rainfall of about 1,600 millimeters, with a mean annual temperature of 24 °C.

=== Administrative divisions and governance ===
Administratively, Kalundu is divided into six quartiers:

- Kalundu
- Kilibula
- Kimanga
- Kabindula
- Nyamianda
- Songo

The commune operates as a decentralized administrative entity with legal personality and autonomy. It is governed by two main bodies: the Conseil Communal (Communal Council) and the Collège Exécutif Communal (Communal Executive College).

- The Conseil Communal serves as the legislative body, composed of councilors elected through direct universal suffrage. It deliberates on issues of economic, social, cultural, and technical importance and elects the Bourgmestre (Mayor) and Deputy Mayor through indirect vote.
- The Collège Exécutif Communal, comprising the Mayor, Deputy Mayor, and two communal aldermen, functions as the executive arm, tasked with implementing council decisions and managing communal affairs.

Public services within the commune include civil registry, sanitation, and demographic services, supported by technical offices representing national ministries. These services span urban planning, agriculture, education, public health, fisheries, infrastructure, environmental protection, finance, and energy. Additionally, national security and migration agencies such as the Agence Nationale de Renseignements (ANR), Direction Générale de Migration (DGM), and the Commissariat Communal of the Congolese National Police maintain a local presence in Kalundu.

== Economy ==
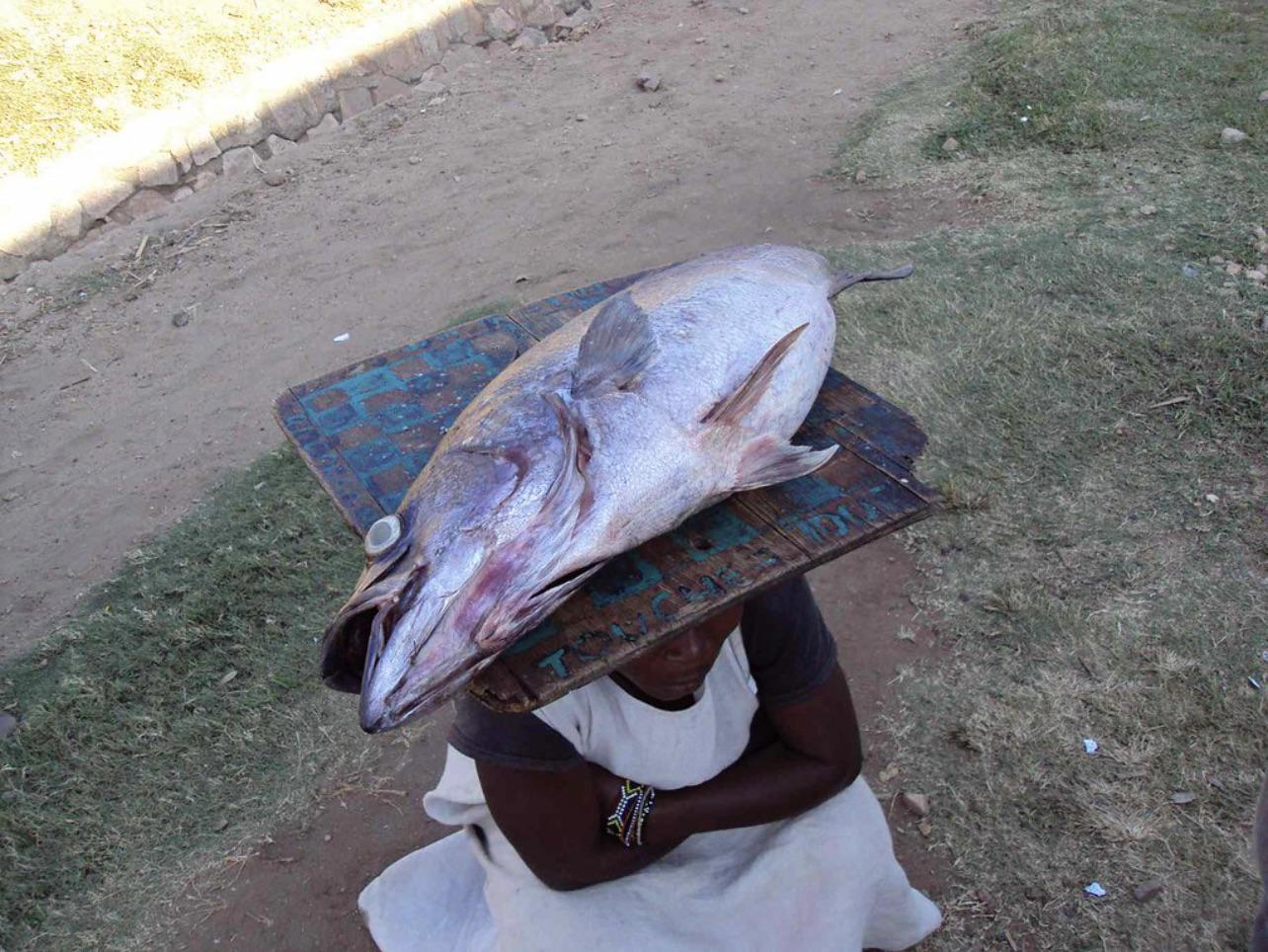
A large fish, caught by a woman balancing it on her head from Lake Tanganyika, en route to the market in Uvira

The commune's economy is characterized by the informal sector, small and medium-sized enterprises (SMEs), an active port, and a growing financial services industry. For decades, local economic activity has revolved around various forms of informal production, artistic creation, service provision, and commercial exchange. These activities include agriculture, carpentry (wood and metal), pastry making, jewelry, sculpture, weaving, tailoring, embroidery, shoemaking, painting, and mechanical or electrical repairs. Informal services such as urban transport, food catering, hairdressing, and street vending are also widespread. Trade and distribution form a key part of Kalundu's economic life, involving local and cross-border exchanges.

The Kalundu Market (Marché de Kalundu) serves as a central hub for commerce that offers agricultural goods and essential products sourced from within the DRC and neighboring countries, including Rwanda, Burundi, Tanzania, and Zambia. Local trade is conducted by both fixed-location retailers, which operate from homes, shops, and market stalls, and mobile street vendors who circulate through the commune. These street vendors, many of whom are young people, form a large segment of the local informal economy.

Energy consumption is largely reliant on biomass, with approximately 91% of households using firewood or charcoal for cooking and heating, which has contributed to accelerated deforestation on the surrounding hillsides. While the Société Nationale d'Électricité (SNEL) remains the primary supplier of electricity, the commune faces challenges due to insufficient supply, and, in response, the use of solar power has been steadily increasing.

The Port of Kalundu is historically the DRC's second-largest international port. Strategically located on Lake Tanganyika, it facilitates trade between the DRC and East African countries such as Burundi, Tanzania, and Zambia. It once received an average of ten boats per week at its peak, but the port activity declined over the years. In March 2024, a $3.3 million rehabilitation project funded by the Kingdom of the Netherlands and implemented through a partnership between the Congolese government and TradeMark Africa (TMA) was completed, including dredging the port to allow larger vessels, increasing cargo capacity from 800 to 4,000 tonnes, and constructing new administrative offices, warehouses, sanitation facilities, and a dispensary.

The financial sector, particularly microfinance, has expanded considerably since the 1990s. This growth emerged in response to widespread poverty and limited access to traditional banking. Microfinance institutions (MFIs), mutual solidarity funds, and decentralized financial systems (systèmes financiers décentralisés; SFDs) have become important tools for economic empowerment. These institutions, influenced by models like the Grameen Bank, target underserved populations, especially farmers and informal entrepreneurs, with credit, savings, and other financial services. Among them is COOPEC–Kalundu, a cooperative based in Songo along Alpha Avenue (Main Road No. 5), which provides microcredit and encourages savings to stimulate local development. All MFIs and financial cooperatives in the area operate under the supervision of the Central Bank of the Congo.

== Demographics ==
As of 2021, the commune had an estimated population of 110,561 residents. It is characterized by a multi-ethnic composition, with the dominant ethnic group being the Fuliru, followed by the Vira, Bembe, and Bashi.

No.	Quartiers	Men	Women	Boys	Girls	Tot.
1.	Kalundu	4,386	5,246	8,266	8,147	26,045
2.	Kilibula	4,387	3,007	3,638	3,745	14,777
3.	Kimanga	2,338	2,498	5,245	5,329	15,410
4.	Kabindula	3,757	4,290	5,240	5,172	18,459
5.	Nyamianda	2,184	2,877	3,761	4,271	13,093
6.	Songo	3,149	4,401	7,046	8,181	22,777
Total		20,201	22,319	33,196	34,845	110,561

Source: (Bureau de la Mairie Uvira, 2021)

=== Languages ===
A variety of languages are spoken. Kifuliru is the most widely spoken indigenous language. Among the Vira, both Kijoba and Kivira are used, with Kivira being a hybrid language that has emerged from the fusion of Kifuliru and Kijoba. Other languages, spoken to a lesser extent, include Mashi (spoken by the Bashi), Kibembe (spoken by the Bembe), and Kinyarwanda. Swahili serves as a lingua franca, is the most commonly spoken language, and facilitates communication among different ethnic groups.

=== Education ===
The commune hosts numerous educational institutions, ranging from public to private and community-run schools. However, the exact number of schools, including non-registered institutions, is difficult to determine due to the proliferation of informal educational centers. Some of the most prominent schools include the Mwanga Institute of Uvira (Institut Mwanga d'Uvira), Umoja High School (Lycée Umoja), Nuru School Complex Institute (Institut du Complexe Scolaire Nuru), Zawadi Ya Rais, and the Uvira Institute (Institut d'Uvira). While Kalundu offers primary and secondary education, institutions of higher learning are located in the neighboring commune of Mulongwe.

=== Religion ===
Christianity is the dominant religion, with both Catholic and Protestant communities well represented. The commune is also home to a large Catholic cathedral. In addition to mainstream Christian denominations, Muslim residents form a visible minority, and a growing number of charismatic and evangelical sects have emerged in recent years. These groups often operate prayer houses where intense spiritual practices, including exorcisms, are performed throughout the day by charismatic pastors.
