= Catholic Diocese of Goma =

Roman Catholic diocese in the Democratic Republic of the Congo

Diocese of Goma Dioecesis Gomaensis

Location
- Country: Democratic Republic of the Congo
- Metropolitan: Bukavu

Statistics
- Area: 25,000 km^{2} (9,700 sq mi)
- Population: Total; Catholics: (as of 2006); 2,039,000; 795,210 (39.0%)

Information
- Rite: Latin Rite

Current leadership
- Pope: Leo XIV
- Bishop: Willy Ngumbi Ngengele, M.Afr.
- Bishops emeritus: Théophile Kaboy Ruboneka

The Roman Catholic Diocese of Goma (Latin: Gomaën(sis)) is a diocese located in the city of Goma in the ecclesiastical province of Bukavu in the Democratic Republic of the Congo.

== History ==
- 30 June 1959: Established as Apostolic Vicariate of Goma from Apostolic Vicariate of Bukavu
- 10 November 1959: Promoted as Diocese of Goma

== Bishops ==
- Bishops of Goma
  - Bishop Joseph Mikararanga Busimba (1 March 1960 – 7 September 1974)
  - Bishop Faustin Ngabu (7 September 1974 – 18 March 2010)
  - Bishop Théophile Kaboy Ruboneka (18 March 2010 – 23 April 2019)
  - Bishop Willy Ngumbi Ngengele, M.Afr. (23 April 2019 – present)
- Coadjutor bishops
  - Faustin Ngabu (1974)
  - Théophile Kaboy Ruboneka (2009-2010)

== See also ==
- Roman Catholicism in the Democratic Republic of the Congo
