= Christophe Munzihirwa Mwene Ngabo =

Servant of God Archbishop Christophe Munzihirwa Mwene Ngabo SJ
- Archbishop of Bukavu
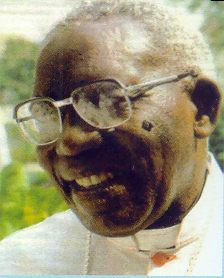
- Photograph in the 1990s.
- Church: Roman Catholic Church
- Archdiocese: Bukavu
- See: Bukavu
- Appointed: 14 March 1995
- Installed: 1995
- Term ended: 29 October 1996
- Predecessor: Aloys Mulindwa Mutabesha Mugoma Mweru
- Successor: Emmanuel Kataliko
- Previous posts: Coadjutor Bishop of Kasongo (1986-90); Bishop of Kasongo (1990-95); Apostolic Administrator of Bukavu (1993-95)

Orders
- Ordination: 17 August 1958
- Consecration: 9 November 1986 by Jozef Tomko

Personal details
- Born: Christophe Munzihirwa Mwene Ngabo; 1926 Burhale, Lukumbo, Sud-Kivu, Democratic Republic of Congo
- Died: 29 October 1996 (aged 70) Bukavu, Sud-Kivu, Democratic Republic of Congo

Christophe Munzihirwa Mwene Ngabo (1926 – 29 October 1996) was a Democratic Republic of the Congo prelate who served as the Archbishop of Bukavu and was a professed member of the Jesuits. Munzihirwa served as the coadjutor and later as the Bishop of Kasongo and he was a vocal supporter of human rights in the face of the conflict that claimed his own life. He studied social sciences and economics abroad before returning to his native land where he served as a parochial vicar and spiritual director all prior to his episcopal appointment.

The cause for his canonization opened under Pope Francis in mid-2016 and the formal process commenced several months later; he now has the posthumous title that recognizes him as a Servant of God. He has been dubbed the "Romero of Congo".

== Life ==
Christophe Munzihirwa Mwene Ngabo was born in 1926 in Sud-Kivu.

He studied first at the local schools and then began his studies for the priesthood where he studied Greek and Latin. His studies then led him to Moba where he was stationed prior to his ordination on 17 August 1958. On 7 September 1963 he entered the Jesuits and made his solemn profession on 9 September 1965. He served as a curate before this so had to renounce the post before he could join. From 1963 until his profession he was first at Kimwenza near Kinshasa and then at Louvain in Belgium for the novitiate. He made a brief visit to Bukavu in-between to restore the Notre Dame de la Victoire college that was devastated during a rebellion before returning to Belgium to acquire a bachelor's degree in social sciences and economics from 1967 to 1969 and then at the Louvain college. His return to his homeland saw him act as a chaplain in Kinshasa but then resumed his education with sociological studies at a Lubumbashi college in 1977 before continuing that at Louvain. On 31 July 1978 he was appointed as the rector of seminarians at the Jesuit institute of Saint Peter Canisius in Kinshasa. In 1980 he was appointed as the provincial superior of the Jesuits in Central Africa.

On 10 March 1986 he was appointed as the Coadjutor Bishop of Kasongo which guaranteed he would ascend to the head of the diocese upon the incumbent's death or resignation; he ascended as the bishop on 30 April 1990 before he was appointed as the Archbishop of Bukavu on 14 March 1995. In mid-1994 he attended a gathering of bishops that Pope John Paul II called for on the subject of Africa. From 15 September 1993 to his new posting he was the apostolic administrator in light of there being no archbishop in place. He received his episcopal consecration on 9 November 1986 from Cardinal Jozef Tomko.

Munzihirwa condemned the First Congo War and was a vocal supporter of human rights which he viewed as an inalienable trait on humankind that God granted upon man. On 28 October 1996 the Rwandan troops poured into the east part of Zaire and he issued a final and fervent plea for aid and for peace and in his radio message said: "We hope that God will not abandon us and that from some part of the world will rise for us a small flare of hope". He saved Trappist nuns on 28 October who had felt unsafe in the area due to the fighting and the threats.

In the afternoon on 29 October 1996 he was shot to death after Rwandan soldiers attacked him; his corpse was left out in the open in the deserted street where he was killed and it was over 24 hours before a group of seminarians recovered his remains. Just after 6:00 p.m. he left the archdiocesan palace and was to go to a Jesuit school to spend the night and so he took to his car his driver and a soldier who was his guard. There was a second vehicle behind them to ensure he was safe but at a crossroads both cars were attacked. The escort vehicle's occupants were killed as was the archbishop's driver and guard. Munzihirwa clutched a crucifix in his hands and came out of the car to go to the soldiers who proceeded to interrogate him through torture before shooting him on the spot. His remains were later interred on 31 October 1996 after his funeral.

== Beatification process ==
The beatification process opened under Pope Francis on 28 May 2016 after the Congregation for the Causes of Saints issued the official "nihil obstat" to the cause therefore titling him as a Servant of God. The diocesan process was opened in Bukvau on 16 January 2017 and it continues at present.

The current postulator for the cause is the Jesuit priest Anton Witwer and the current vice-postulator is Father Boniface Kanozire.
