= Aloys Mulindwa Mutabesha Mugoma Mweru =

Congolese Roman Catholic prelate (1922–1997)

The Most Reverend Aloys Mulindwa Mutabesha Mugoma Mweru
- Archbishop Emeritus of Bukavu, DR Congo (Deceased)
- Church: Catholic Church
- Archdiocese: Roman Catholic Archdiocese of Bukavu
- See: Bukavu
- Appointed: 18 December 1965
- Installed: 20 March 1966
- Term ended: 15 September 1993
- Predecessor: Louis Van Steene
- Successor: Christophe Munzihirwa Mwene Ngabo

Orders
- Ordination: 24 April 1954
- Consecration: 20 March 1966 by Joseph Mikararanga Busimba
- Rank: Archbishop

Personal details
- Born: Aloys Mulindwa Mutabesha Mugoma Mweru; 1 January 1922; Muzinzi, South Kivu, DR Congo
- Died: 21 August 1997 (aged 75); Liège Hospital, Liège, Belgium,

Styles of Aloys Mulindwa Mutabesha Mugoma Mweru
- Reference style: Your Lordship; The Most Reverend
- Spoken style: His Lordship
- Religious style: Bishop

Aloys Mulindwa Mutabesha Mugoma Mweru (1922 – 21 August 1997) was a Congolese Catholic prelate who was the archbishop of the Roman Catholic Archdiocese of Bukavu, DR Congo from 18 December 1965 until his resignation in September 1993. He resigned as archbishop on 15 September 1993. He died on 21 August 1997 in Liège Hospital, Liège, Belgium, at the age of 75.6 years. After 20 years, his remains were repatriated to Bukavu, DR Congo on 6 August 2017. He was buried at Mugeri Cemetery, in North Kivu, on 8 August 2017.

== Background and education ==
He was born in 1922 at Muzinzi, Archdiocese of Bukavu, South Kivu in the Belgian Congo. He studied philosophy and theology at seminary. He was ordained a priest of the archdiocese of Bukavu on 24 April 1954.

== Priesthood ==
On 24 April 1954 he was ordained a priest of the Archdiocese of Bukavu, Belgian Congo. He served in that capacity until 18 December 1965.

== As bishop ==
Pope Paul VI appointed him as Archbishop of the Roman Catholic Diocese of Bukavu, on 18 December 1965. He was the first indigenous Congolese to serve in that position in the history of the archdiocese.

He was ordained bishop and installed at Bukavu on 20 March 1966 by the hands of Bishop Joseph Mikararanga Busimba, Bishop of Goma assisted by Bishop Danilo Catarzi, Bishop of Uvira and Bishop Gabriel Ukec, Bishop of Bunia.

He resigned as archbishop of Bukavu on 15 September 1993. He retired and relocated to Banneux, outside Liège, Belgium. He died at the Liège Hospital, in Liège, on 21 August 1997, about five months shy of his 76th birthday.

After 20 years from his death, his remains were relocated from Belgium where he died to his native Bukavu, Democratic Republic of the Congo. The remains arrived in the DR Congo on 6 August 2017 and were buried outside of Bukavu in North Kivu on 8 August 2017.

While Archbishop of Bukavu he ordained as a priest, François-Xavier Maroy Rusengo on 19 August 1984. He was later appointed archbishop at Bukavu.

== See also ==
- Catholic Church in the Democratic Republic of the Congo

== Succession table ==
Catholic Church titles
Preceded by Louis Van Steene (8 March 1957 - 24 May 1965)	Archbishop of Bukavu (18 December 1965 - 15 September 1993)	Succeeded by Christophe Munzihirwa Mwene Ngabo (14 March 1995 - 29 October 1996)
