= François-Xavier Maroy Rusengo =

Congolese Roman Catholic prelate (born 1956)

The Most Reverend François-Xavier Maroy Rusengo
- Archbishop of Bukavu, Democratic Republic of the Congo
- Church: Catholic Church
- Archdiocese: Roman Catholic Archdiocese of Bukavu
- See: Bukavu
- Appointed: 26 April 2006
- Installed: 18 June 2006
- Predecessor: Charles Kambale Mbogha
- Successor: Incumbent
- Other post(s): Auxiliary Bishop of Bukavu (22 November 2004 - 26 April 2006)

Orders
- Ordination: 19 August 1984 by Archbishop Aloys Mulindwa Mutabesha Mugoma Mweru
- Consecration: 16 January 2005 by Archbishop Giovanni d’Aniello
- Rank: Archbishop

Personal details
- Born: François-Xavier Maroy Rusengo; 1 September 1956 (age 69); Bukavu, DR Congo
- Motto: "Thy will be done."

Styles of François-Xavier Maroy Rusengo
- Reference style: Your Lordship; The Most Reverend
- Spoken style: His Lordship
- Religious style: Archbishop

François-Xavier Maroy Rusengo (born 1 September 1956) is a Congolese Catholic prelate who is the archbishop of the Roman Catholic Archdiocese of Bukavu in DR Congo since 26 April 2006. Before that, from 22 November 2004 until 26 April 2006 he was auxiliary bishop of the archdiocese of Bukavu. He succeeded as archbishop on 26 April 2006, following the death of Archbishop Charles Kambale Mbogha, on 9 October 2005. Archbishop François-Xavier Maroy Rusengo was installed at Bukavu, DR Congo on 18 June 2006.

== Background and education ==
He was born on 1 September 1956 in Bukavu, South Kivu, Archdiocese of Bukavu. He completed elementary education at the Sainte-Thérèse School in Bugabo. In 1970 he entered the Notre-Dame-de-la-Victoire College, where he studied chemistry and biology. He then studied philosophy and theology at the major seminary. He was ordained a priest of the Roman Catholic Archdiocese of Bukavu on 19 August 1984.

== Priesthood ==
He was ordained a priest on 19 August 1984 by Archbishop Aloys Mulindwa Mutabesha Mugoma Mweru, Archbishop of Bukavu. He served in that capacity until 22 November 2004.

He served in various roles and locations while a priest, including as:

- Vicar at the parish of Burhale from 1984 until 1985.
- Rector of the Cibimbi Minor Seminary from 1985 until 1987.
- Deputy general bursar at the General Bursar's Office from 1987 until 1988.
- Rector of Mugeri Propaedeutic and Minor Seminary from 1988 until 1997.
- Pastor at the parish of Saint-François-Xavier in Kadutu from 1997 until 2002.
- Episcopal vicar in charge of pastoral care from 2002 until 2004.
- Vicar General of the Archdiocese of Bukavu from 2002 to 2004.

== As bishop ==
On 22 November 2004, Pope John Paul II appointed Father Monsignor François-Xavier Maroy Rusengo as Auxiliary Bishop of the Archdiocese of Bukavu. He was contemporaneously appointed as Titular Bishop of Thucca in Mauretania. He was consecrated and installed at Bukavu on 16 January 2005 by the hands of Archbishop Giovanni d'Aniello, Titular Archbishop of Pesto, assisted by Cardinal Frédéric Etsou-Nzabi-Bamungwabi, Archbishop of Kinshasa and Archbishop Charles Kambale Mbogha, Archbishop of Bukavu.

On 26 April 2006 Pope Benedict XVI elevated him to archbishop and appointed as Archbishop of the Ecclesiastical Province of Bukavu. He was installed at Bukavu as archbishop on 18 June 2006.

The bishop has spoken out against conflict in the region. In January 2025 he published a “message of comfort” in which he lamented that “for two years, many of our brothers and sisters have had nothing other than their eyes to weep and their feet to flee, sometimes without a destination, and even the camps for the displaced are not secure, several villages are saturated, and others emptied of their populations.

== See also ==
- Catholic Church in the Democratic Republic of the Congo

== Succession table ==
Catholic Church titles
Preceded by	Auxiliary Bishop of Bukavu (22 November 2004 - 26 April 2006)	Succeeded by
Preceded by Charles Kambale Mbogha (13 March 2001 - 9 October 2005)	Archbishop of Bukavu (since 26 April 2006)	Succeeded by Incumbent
