= Archdiocese of Bukavu =

Roman Catholic archdiocese in eastern Democratic Republic of the Congo

Coordinates: 2.5018°S 28.8595°E

Archdiocese of Archdiocese of Bukavu Archidioecesis Bukavuensis French: Archidiocèse de Bukavu

Location
- Country: Democratic Republic of the Congo
- Territory: Bukavu

Statistics
- Area: 8,115 km^{2} (3,133 sq mi)
- Population: Total; Catholics: (as of 2020); ▲2,799,287; ▲1,099,164 (▼39.3%)

Information
- Denomination: Roman Catholic
- Rite: Latin (or Roman)
- Established: 26 December 1929
- Cathedral: Our Lady of Peace

Current leadership
- Bishop: Archbishop François-Xavier Maroy Rusengo

Website
- Official website

The Roman Catholic Archdiocese of Bukavu (Latin: Bukavuen(sis)) is the Metropolitan See for the ecclesiastical province of Bukavu in the Democratic Republic of the Congo.

== History ==
- 26 December 1929: Established as Apostolic Vicariate of Kivu from the Apostolic Vicariate of Upper Congo
- 10 January 1952: Renamed as Apostolic Vicariate of Costermansville
- 6 January 1954: Renamed as Apostolic Vicariate of Bukavu
- 10 November 1959: Promoted as Metropolitan Archdiocese of Bukavu

== Special churches ==
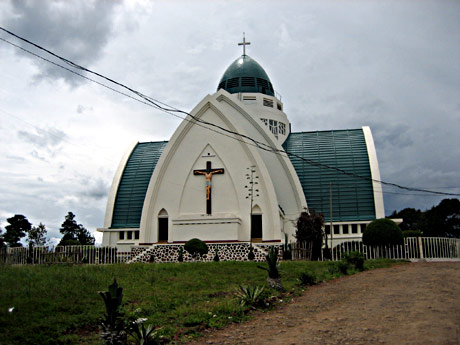
Cathédrale Notre Dame de la Paix

The seat of the archbishop is Cathédrale Notre Dame de la Paix in Bukavu.

== Bishops ==
=== Ordinaries, in reverse chronological order ===
- Metropolitan Archbishops of Bukavu (Latin Rite), below
  - Archbishop François-Xavier Maroy Rusengo since 26 April 2006
  - Archbishop Charles Kambale Mbogha, A.A. (13 March 2001 – 9 October 2005)
  - Archbishop Emmanuel Kataliko (3 March 1997 – 4 October 2000)
  - Archbishop Christophe Munzihirwa Mwene Ngabo, S.J. (14 March 1995 – 29 October 1996)
  - Archbishop Aloys Mulindwa Mutabesha Mugoma Mweru (18 December 1965 – 15 September 1993)
  - Archbishop Louis van Steene, M. Afr. (10 November 1959 – 24 May 1965); see below
- Vicars Apostolic of Bukavu (Latin Rite), below
  - Bishop Louis van Steene, M. Afr. (8 March 1957 – 10 November 1959); see above
  - Bishop Xavier Geeraerts, M. Afr. (17 January 1952 – 8 March 1957)
- Vicars Apostolic of Kivu (Roman rite), below
  - Bishop Richard Cleire, M. Afr. (14 December 1944 – 10 January 1952), appointed Vicar Apostolic of Kasongo
  - Bishop Edoardo Luigi Antonio Leys, M. Afr. (6 January 1930 – August 1944)

=== Coadjutor vicar apostolic ===
- Louis Van Steene, M. Afr. (1955-1957)

=== Auxiliary bishop ===
- François-Xavier Maroy Rusengo (2004-2006)

=== Priests from this diocese who were named bishops ===
- Emile Mushosho Matabaro, named Bishop of Doruma-Dugu on 24 October 2022.

== Suffragan dioceses ==
- Butembo-Beni
- Goma
- Kasongo
- Kindu
- Uvira

== Conflict in Kivu ==
The local Catholic Church has suffered greatly from the ongoing instability and conflict in North and South Kivu, where the diocese is located.

In an interview with Catholic charity Aid to the Church in Need, in 2024, the head of the Archdiocese of Bukavu lamented that "for 30 years, we have been in a cycle of violence and eternal new beginnings. One knows when the war starts, but not when it will end. For 30 years, we have been evangelising in the midst of war and trying to convey this message of hope to the people: God created man for life, not for death! We must not give up.”

However, the Vicar General Floribert Bashimb added that the Church continues to grow. "Despite all this, the number of faithful in the archdiocese has increased. And our schools and hospitals are among the most renowned in the country.” In a second interview with pontifical charity Aid to the Church in Need, he described how the M23 had also entered North Kivu, and disrupted life there, but that the Church and its priests remained in place and were a source of hope for the population.

== See also ==
- Roman Catholicism in the Democratic Republic of the Congo
- List of Roman Catholic dioceses in the Democratic Republic of the Congo
