= Diocese of Kisantu =

Roman Catholic diocese in the Democratic Republic of the Congo

Diocese of Kisantu Dioecesis Kisantuensis

Location
- Country: Democratic Republic of the Congo
- Metropolitan: Kinshasa

Statistics
- Area: 31,000 km^{2} (12,000 sq mi)
- Population: Total; Catholics: (as of 2004); 900,500; 601,000 (66.7%)

Information
- Rite: Latin Rite

Current leadership
- Pope: Leo XIV
- Bishop: Jean-Crispin Kimbeni Ki Kanda
- Bishops emeritus: Fidèle Nsielele Zi Mputu

The Roman Catholic Diocese of Kisantu (Latin: Kisantuen(sis)) is a diocese located in the city of Kisantu in the ecclesiastical province of Kinshasa in the Democratic Republic of the Congo.

== History ==
- 1 April 1931: Established as Apostolic Vicariate of Kisantu from the Apostolic Vicariate of Koango
- 10 November 1959: Promoted as Diocese of Kisantu

=== Territorial Changes ===
- 28 January 1935: Gained territory from Apostolic Vicariate of Kwango
- 24 May 1950: Lost territory to Apostolic Vicariate of Léopoldville
- 5 July 1957: Lost territory to establish Apostolic Prefecture of Kenge
- 24 June 1961: Lost territory to establish Diocese of Popokabaka

== Bishops ==
=== Ordinaries ===
- Vicar Apostolic of Kisantu (Latin Rite)
  - Alphonse Verwimp, S.J. (23 June 1931 – 10 November 1959 ); see below
- Bishops of Kisantu (Latin Rite)
  - Alphonse Verwimp, S.J. (10 November 1959 – 27 October 1960 ); see above
  - Pierre Kimbondo (24 June 1961 – 27 April 1973), Archbishop (personal title) in 1971
  - Antoine Mayala ma Mpangu (27 April 1973 – 31 March 1993)
  - Fidèle Nsielele Zi Mputu (10 June 1994 - 21 November 2020)
  - Jean-Crispin Kimbeni Ki Kanda (11 June 2022 – present)

=== Coadjutor bishop ===
- Antoine Mayala ma Mpangu (1971-1973)

=== Auxiliary bishop ===
- Pierre Kimbondo (1956-1961), appointed Bishop here

== See also ==
- Roman Catholicism in the Democratic Republic of the Congo

== Sources ==
- GCatholic.org
- Catholic Hierarchy
