= Jean-Crispin Kimbeni Ki Kanda =

Congolese Catholic prelate (born in 1969)

The Most Reverend Jean-Crispin Kimbeni Ki Kanda
- Bishop of Kisantu, Democratic Republic of the Congo
- Church: Catholic Church
- Archdiocese: Roman Catholic Archdiocese of Kinshasa
- See: Roman Catholic Diocese of Kisantu
- Appointed: 11 June 2022
- Installed: 6 August 2022
- Predecessor: Fidèle Nsielele Zi Mputu
- Successor: Incumbent
- Other post: Auxiliary Bishop of Kinshasa (29 June 2020 - 11 June 2022)

Orders
- Ordination: 30 May 1999 by Cardinal Frédéric Etsou-Nzabi-Bamungwabi
- Consecration: 10 October 2020 by Cardinal Fridolin Ambongo Besungu
- Rank: Bishop

Personal details
- Born: Jean-Crispin Kimbeni Ki Kanda; 22 October 1969 (age 56) Kinshasa, Archdiocese of Kinshasa, Democratic Republic of the Congo
- Motto: "Fidelis est qui vocavit vos" (He is faithful who has called you).

Styles of Jean-Crispin Kimbeni Ki Kanda
- Reference style: Your Lordship; The Most Reverend
- Spoken style: His Lordship
- Religious style: Bishop

Jean-Crispin Kimbeni Ki Kanda (born 22 October 1969) is a Congolese Catholic prelate who serves as Bishop of the Roman Catholic Diocese of Kisantu, in the Democratic Republic of the Congo, since 11 June 2022. Before that, from 29 June 2020 until 11 June 2022, he was Auxiliary Bishop of the Roman Catholic Archdiocese of Kinshasa. He was appointed bishop on 29 June 2020 by Pope Francis. He was consecrated and installed at Kinshasa, on 10 October 2020. He served as Titular Bishop of Dragonara concurrently while auxiliary bishop. On 11 June 2022, The Holy Father transferred him to the Diocese of Kisantu as the Local Ordinary. He was installed at Kisantu on 6 August 2022.

== Background and education ==
Jean-Crispin Kimbeni was born on 22 October 1969 at Kinshasa, Archdiocese of Kinshasa, in the Democratic Republic of the Congo. He attended primary and secondary school in his home area. He studied at the Saint Jean-Marie Vianney Preparatory Seminary. He studied philosophy at the Saint-André Kaggwa Major Seminary. He then studied theology at the Saint Jean XXIII Major Seminary both in Kinshasa. From 1999 until 2001, he studied at the Catholic University of the Congo graduating with a Licentiate in philosophy and a professional teaching license. In 2011, he graduated with a Master's degree in bioethics from the Camillianum International Institute, in Rome, Italy, affiliated with the Pontifical Lateran University. He continued his studies there and graduated with a Doctorate in the pastoral theology of health in 2019.

== Priest ==
He was ordained a deacon on 30 May 1998 in Kinshasa. He was ordained a priest of the Roman Catholic Archdiocese of Kinshasa on 30 May 1999 by Cardinal Frédéric Etsou-Nzabi-Bamungwabi, Archbishop of Kinshasa. He served as priest until 29 June 2020.

While a priest, he served in various roles and locations including as:

- Studies at the Catholic University of the Congo leading to a licentiate in philosophy and a professional teaching license from 1999 until 2001.
- Formator and lecturer at the Cardinal Malula Preparatory Seminary from 1999 until 2002.
- Deputy secretary and chancellor of the archdiocese of Kinshasa.
- Vice-rector of the Notre-Dame de la Paix de Fatima Shrine from 2001 until 2002.
- Official at the Congregation for the Evangelisation of Peoples from 2002 until 2020.
- Parish administrator of Santa Maria Assunta in Cielo, Borgo Pineto, in the Roman Catholic Diocese of Civita Castellana in Italy from 2017 until 2020.

== As bishop ==
On 29 June 2020, The Holy Father appointed Reverend Father Monsignor Jean-Crispin Kimbeni Ki Kanda, previously the parish administrator of Santa Maria Assunta in Cielo, Borgo Pineto, diocese of Civita Castellana, as Titular Bishop of Dragonara and concurrently as Auxiliary Bishop of Kinshasa. He was consecrated and installed at Kinshasa, on 10 October 2020 by the hands of Cardinal Fridolin Ambongo Besungu, Archbishop of Kinshasa assisted by Archbishop Ettore Balestrero, Titular Archbishop of Victoriana and Archbishop Marcel Utembi Tapa, Archbishop of Kisangani.

On 11 June 2022, Pope Francis appointed him Bishop of the Diocese of Kisantu in the Metropolitan Ecclesiastical Province of Kinshasa. He was installed at Kisantu on 6 August 2022.

== See also ==
- Catholic Church in the Democratic Republic of the Congo

== Succession table ==
Catholic Church titles
Preceded by	Auxiliary Bishop of Kinshasa (29 June 2020 - 11 June 2022)	Succeeded by
Preceded by Fidèle Nsielele Zi Mputu (10 June 1994 - 21 November 2020)	Bishop of Kisantu (since 11 June 2022)	Succeeded by Incumbent
