= Mputu =

Mputu (literally "Europe" in Kikongo) is a surname of Congolese origin. Notable people with the surname include:

- Fidèle Nsielele Zi Mputu (born 1950), Congolese theologian and catholic priest
- Liz Mputu, Congolese-American artist
- Trésor Mputu (born 1985), Congolese footballer
- Véro Tshanda Beya Mputu, Congolese actress
