= Christian Alliance University =

Christian village in the Congo

Coordinates: 5°51′34″S 13°03′25″E

- Type: Private
- Affiliations: Christian and Missionary Alliance
- Rector: Joseph Ngoma Nzita
- Faculty: 10
- Students: 60
- Location: Boma, Congo, Bas-Congo, Democratic Republic of the Congo
- Campus: Suburban
- Campus size: 88 acres (360,000 m^{2})

The Christian Alliance University (French: Université de l'Alliance Chrétienne) is an Evangelical Christian University located in Boma, Congo. It is affiliated with the Christian and Missionary Alliance.

== History ==
With the help of the Christianity and Missionary Alliance in the USA and Canada, the Evangelical Community of the Alliance in Congo launched the Boma Seminary in September 1976. Three students were part of the first class: Esaron Lelo Mavinga, Dynobert Nlandu Nguala and Justin-Abraham Kumbu-ki-Makaya.

Under the leadership of Dr. Nathalis Songo Vangu, its first African Rector, the seminary underwent a significant growth sprout. As an example, in June 1991, 11 men and women graduated from FACTEB. Unfortunately, this growth would come to a virtual halt with the turmoil in the Congo during the nineties. In 1992, the seminary changed its status from a seminary to graduate school, offering both undergraduate and graduate degrees. This explains the change in the name of the institution, from Institut Supérieur de Théologie Évangélique de Boma (ISTEB) to Faculté de Théologie Évangélique de Boma (FACTEB).

In 2012, it was renamed Université de l'Alliance au Congo (UAC) with the addition of two new faculties, Management, Information & Communication and Computer Sciences.

In 2015, it was renamed Université de l'Alliance Chrétienne with the addition of two new faculties, Law & Criminal Science and Economics.

== Academics ==
FACTEB offers undergraduate degree programs and master's degrees through on-campus study.
