= Kalamu, Boma =

Commune of Boma, Democratic Republic of the Congo

Coordinates: 4°20′27″S 15°18′58″E

Kalamu is one of the three communes of the city of Boma in the Kongo Central Province in the Democratic Republic of the Congo. The others are Kabondo and Nzadi.
