= Fidèle Nsielele Zi Mputu =

Congolese Catholic prelate (born in 1950)

The Most Reverend Fidèle Nsielele Zi Mputu
- Bishop Emeritus of Kisantu, Democratic Republic of the Congo
- Church: Catholic Church
- Archdiocese: Roman Catholic Archdiocese of Kinshasa
- See: Roman Catholic Diocese of Kisantu
- Appointed: 10 June 1994
- Installed: 22 September 1994
- Term ended: 21 November 2020
- Predecessor: Antoine Mayala ma Mpangu
- Successor: Jean-Crispin Kimbeni Ki Kanda

Orders
- Ordination: 26 September 1976
- Consecration: 25 September 1994 by Cardinal Frédéric Etsou-Nzabi-Bamungwabi
- Rank: Bishop

Personal details
- Born: Fidèle Nsielele Zi Mputu; 21 July 1950 (age 76) Kinshasa, Archdiocese of Kinshasa, Democratic Republic of the Congo

Styles of Fidèle Nsielele Zi Mputu
- Reference style: Your Lordship; The Most Reverend
- Spoken style: His Lordship
- Religious style: Bishop

Fidèle Nsielele Zi Mputu (born 21 July 1950) is a Congolese Catholic prelate who was the bishop of the Roman Catholic Diocese of Kisantu in DRC, from 10 June 1994 until his health-related early resignation on 21 November 2020. Prior to then, from 26 September 1976 until he was appointed bishop, he was a priest of the Roman Catholic Archdiocese of Kinshasa. He was appointed bishop by Pope John Paul II on 10 June 1994. He was installed at Kisantu on 25 September 1994. His health-related resignation request was accepted by Pope Francis and took effect on 21 November 2020.

== Background and priesthood ==
He was born on 21 July 1950 at Kinshasa, Archdiocese of Kinshasa, in the Democratic Congo. He studied philosophy and theology at seminary. He was ordained a priest for the Roman Catholic Archdiocese of Kinshasa on 26 September 1976. He served as priest until 10 June 1994.

== Bishop ==
On 10 June 1994, Pope John Paul II appointed him Bishop of the Roman Catholic Diocese of Kisantu. He was consecrated as bishop on 25 September 1994 at the Kisantu Diocesan Cathedral at Kisantu. The Principal Consecrator was Cardinal Frédéric Etsou-Nzabi-Bamungwabi, Archbishop of Kinshasa assisted by Gabriel Kembo Mamputu, Bishop of Matadi, and Joachim Mbadu Kikhela Kupika, Bishop of Boma. While bishop, he was a member of the team of Catholic bishops selected by the Episcopal Conference of the Democratic Republic of the Congo (CENCO) to mediate a peace deal between the Congolese government and the opposition parties in the 2016 to 2017 time frame.

Pope Francis accepted the health-related resignation request from the pastoral care of the Episcopal See of Kisantu, presented by Bishop Fidèle Nsielele Zi Mputu on 21 November 2020. There was a period when Cardinal Fridolin Ambongo Besungu, Archbishop of Kinshasa served as apostolic administrator at Kisantu (21 November 2020 - 6 August 2022). On 11 June 2022, Pope Francis appointed Bishop Jean-Crispin Kimbeni Ki Kanda to succeed at Kisantu. He was installed there on 6 August 2022.

== See also ==
- Catholic Church in the Democratic Republic of the Congo

== Succession table ==
Catholic Church titles
Preceded by Antoine Mayala ma Mpangu (27 April 1973 - 31 March 1993)	Bishop of Kisantu (10 June 1994 - 21 November 2020)	Succeeded by Jean-Crispin Kimbeni Ki Kanda (since 11 June 2022)
