= Kabondo, Boma =

Commune of Boma, Democratic Republic of the Congo

Kabondo is one of the three communes of the city of Boma in the Kongo Central Province in the Democratic Republic of the Congo. The others are Kalamu and Nzadi.
