= José-Claude Mbimbi Mbamba =

Congolese Catholic prelate (born 1962)

The Most Reverend José-Claude Mbimbi Mbamba
- Bishop of Boma, Democratic Republic of the Congo
- Church: Catholic Church
- Archdiocese: Roman Catholic Archdiocese of Kinshasa
- See: Roman Catholic Diocese of Boma
- Appointed: 19 March 2021
- Installed: 27 June 2021
- Predecessor: Cyprien Mbuka Di Nkuanga
- Successor: Incumbent

Orders
- Ordination: 28 August 1988
- Consecration: 27 June 2021 by Cardinal Fridolin Ambongo Besungu
- Rank: Bishop

Personal details
- Born: José-Claude Mbimbi Mbamba; 30 July 1962 (age 64) Kinshasa, Archdiocese of Kinshasa, Democratic Republic of the Congo

Styles of José-Claude Mbimbi Mbamba
- Reference style: Your Lordship; The Most Reverend
- Spoken style: His Lordship
- Religious style: Bishop

José-Claude Mbimbi Mbamba (born 30 July 1962) is a Congolese Catholic prelate who is the bishop of the Roman Catholic Diocese of Boma in the Democratic Republic of the Congo since 19 March 2021. Before that, from 28 August 1988 until he was appointed bishop, he was a priest of the Diocese of Boma, in the Catholic Archdiocese of Kinshasa. He was appointed bishop on 19 March 2021 by Pope Francis. He was consecrated and installed at Boma on 27 June 2021.

== Background and education ==
He was born on 30 July 1962 in Kinshasa. He studied at the Great Commission Movement of Rwanda (GSCOM in Rwanda) from 1974 until 1980, graduating with a diploma from there. He studied philosophy at the Grand Séminaire de Philosophie Abbé Ngidi in Boma from 1980 until 1983. He then transferred to the Grand Séminaire Saint Robert Bellarmin de Mayidi, in Kongo Central, where he studied theology. He holds a diploma in philosophy, and African religions awarded by the Catholic University of Congo. The same university awarded him a Bachelor's degree in theology during the time he studied there from 1984 until 1998. He went on to graduate with a Licentiate in philosophy in 1994, having studied for it since 1992 at the Catholic University of Congo. From 2003 until 2004, he studied the Italian language at an institution in Rome, Italy. From 2004 until 2005, he studied the German language at an institution Germany. He graduated with a Doctorate in Philosophy from the University of Tübingen, in Germany, having studied there from 2005 until 2011.

== Priest ==
He was ordained a priest of the Diocese of Boma on 28 August 1988. He served as a priest until 19 March 2021.

While a priest, he served in various roles and locations including:

- Seminarian sent in mission to the Saint Pierre Parish, Diocese of Pointe-Noire, Congo-Brazzaville from 1983 until 1984.
- Professor at the Petit Séminaire Saint François Xavier de Mbata Kiela in Boma from 1988 until 1992.
- Rector of the Saint Augustin University of Kinshasa in 1994.
- Professor and Vice-rector at the Grand Séminaire de Philosophie Abbé Ngidi from 1994 until 1998.
- Special secretary to the auxiliary bishop of Boma from 1998 until 2001.
- Appointee for the initial formation of future priests from 1998 until 2003.
- Secretary and diocesan chancellor of Boma Diocese from 2001 until 2003.
- Pastoral collaborator in the Roman Catholic Diocese of Rottenburg-Stuttgart, as vicar of Herrenberg and assistant to the local Italian community in Herrenberg, Germany from 2005 until 2012.
- Professor of the Grand Séminaire de Philosophie Abbé Ngidi from 2012 until 2021.
- Rector of the Grand Séminaire de Philosophie Abbé Ngidi from 2014 until 2021.
- Episcopal vicar for the laity in the Diocese of Boma from 2014 until 2021.

== Bishop ==
On 19 March 2021, following the age-related resignation of Bishop Cyprien Mbuka Di Nkuanga, Pope Francis appointed Reverend Father José-Claude Mbimbi Mbamba as the local ordinary of the Catholic Diocese of Boma in the Metropolitan Ecclesiastical Province of Kinshasa. He was consecrated and installed at Boma on 27 June 2021 by the hands of Cardinal Fridolin Ambongo Besungu, Archbishop of Kinshasa assisted by Archbishop Ettore Balestrero, Titular Archbishop of Victoriana and Bishop Cyprien Mbuka Di Nkuanga, Bishop Emeritus of Boma.

== See also ==
- Catholic Church in the Democratic Republic of the Congo

== Succession table ==
Catholic Church titles
Preceded by Cyprien Mbuka Di Nkuanga (13 March 2001 - 19 March 2021)	Bishop of Boma (since 19 March 2021)	Succeeded by (Incumbent)
