= Inkisi Airport =

- IATA: none; ICAO: FZAS

Summary
- Serves: Inkisi, Democratic Republic of the Congo
- Elevation AMSL: 600 m (2,000 ft)
- Coordinates: 05°10′S 015°00′E

Map
- Location of airport in the Democratic Republic of the Congo
- Source: Great Circle Mapper

Inkisi Airport (ICAO: FZAS) is an airport serving the town of Inkisi (also known as Kisantu), Kongo Central province, Democratic Republic of the Congo.
