= Our Lady of the Assumption Cathedral, Boma =

Our Lady of the Assumption Cathedral
- Cathédrale Notre Dame de l’Assomption
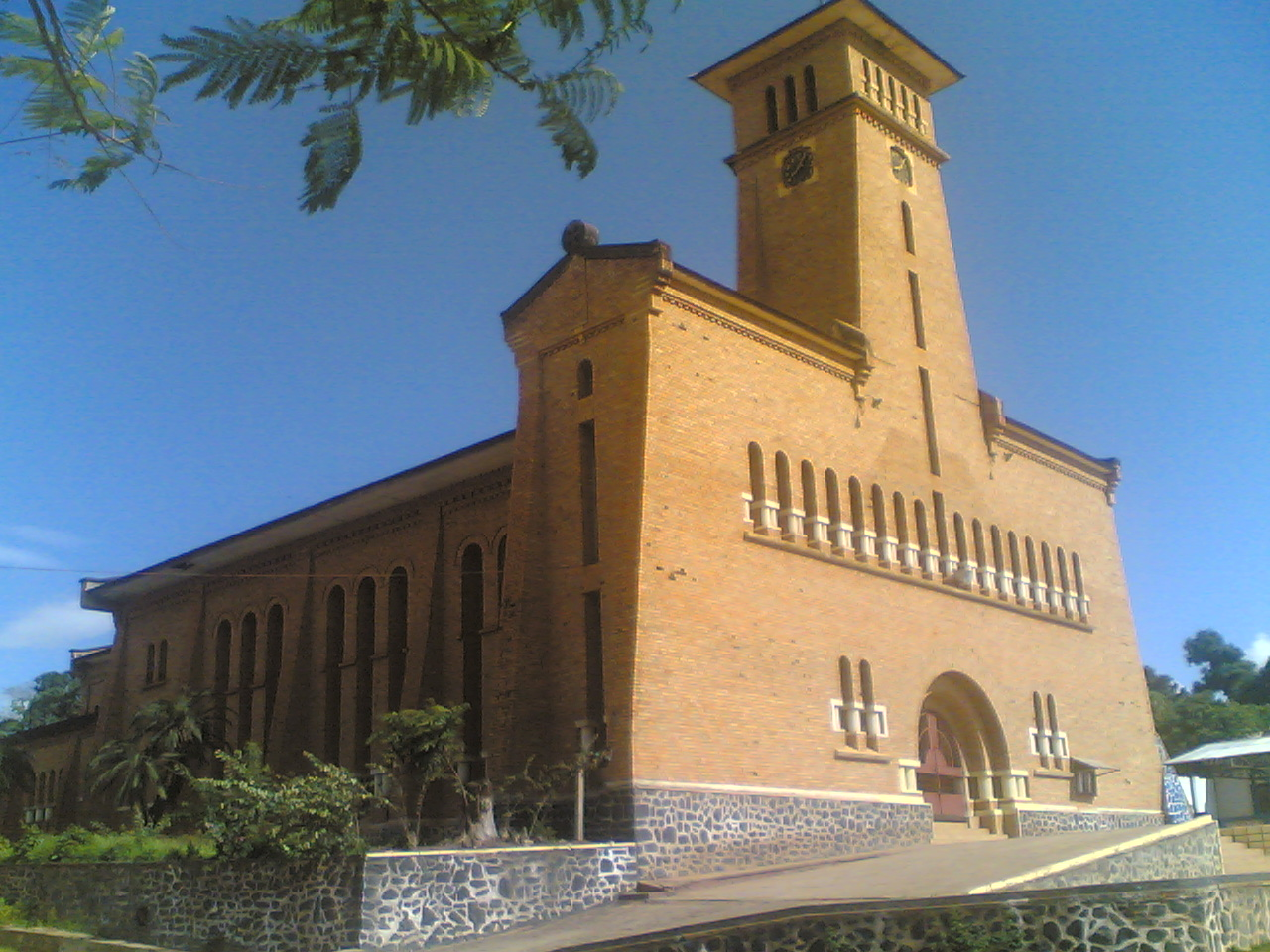
- Our Lady of the Assumption Cathedral
- 5.8536°S 13.05648°E
- Location: Boma
- Country: Democratic Republic of the Congo
- Denomination: Roman Catholic Church

The Our Lady of the Assumption Cathedral (French: Cathédrale Notre Dame de l’Assomption ) also called Boma Cathedral Is the name given to a religious building affiliated with the Catholic Church which is located in the city of Boma in the province of Bas Congo in the western part of the African country of the Democratic Republic of the Congo. It should not be confused with the «Old Cathedral» also dedicated to the Assumption of Mary in the same locality.

The current structure that serves as a cathedral dates back to 1951 and replaced another church dating from 1890.

The congregation follows the Roman or Latin rite and the temple is the mother church of the Diocese of Boma (Dioecesis Bomaensis) which was created as apostolic vicariate in 1934 when the country was part of the Belgian Congo and was elevated to its present status in 1959 by The bull "Cum parvulum" of Pope John XXIII.

It is under the pastoral responsibility of Bishop Cyprien Mbuka Nkuanga. In 2015 work began on remodeling with the technical support of China and under the promotion of the provincial government.

== See also ==
- Roman Catholicism in the Democratic Republic of the Congo
- Our Lady of the Congo Cathedral
