= Nzadi =

Coordinates: 5°12′S 15°07′E

Nzadi is a commune of the city of Boma in the Democratic Republic of the Congo.

== Etymology ==
Nzadi means "river" in the Kikongo language.

== Geography ==
The commune of Nzadi is bounded by the Muba River to the east, the Kalamu River to the west, the Kalamu River and "Point D" (marking the city limit) to the north, and the Congo River to the south.

== Society ==
As of 2018, the commune of Nzadi has a population of 111,635.

Our Lady of the Assumption Cathedral, Boma, the seat of the Diocese of Boma of the Roman Catholic Church, is located in Nzadi. Within that diocese, the parish of Nzadi also falls within the Boma deanery.

== Education ==
- Boma-Nzadi Technical and Vocational Institute
- Boma-Nzadi Higher Institute of Pedagogy
- Boma Mungu Institute
