= Diocese of Boma =

Roman Catholic diocese in the Democratic Republic of the Congo

Coordinates: 5.8536°S 13.0566°E

Diocese of Boma Dioecesis Bomaensis

Location
- Country: Democratic Republic of the Congo
- Metropolitan: Kinshasa

Statistics
- Area: 11,350 km^{2} (4,380 sq mi)
- Population: Total; Catholics: (as of 2004); 512,213; 171,230 (33.4%)

Information
- Rite: Latin Rite

Current leadership
- Pope: Leo XIV
- Bishop: José-Claude Mbimbi Mbamba
- Bishops emeritus: Cyprien Mbuka Nkuanga, C.I.C.M.

The Roman Catholic Diocese of Boma (Latin: Bomaën(sis)) is a diocese located in the city of Boma in the ecclesiastical province of Kinshasa in the Democratic Republic of the Congo.

== History ==
- 26 February 1934: Established as Apostolic Vicariate of Boma from the Apostolic Prefecture of Lulua and Central Katanga and Apostolic Vicariate of Léopoldville
- 10 November 1959: Promoted as Diocese of Boma

== Bishops ==
=== Ordinaries, in reverse chronological order ===
- Bishops of Boma (Roman rite), below
  - Bishop José-Claude Mbimbi Mbamba (since 19 March 2021)
  - Bishop Cyprien Mbuka Di Nkuanga, C.I.C.M. (13 March 2001 – 19 March 2021)
  - Bishop Joachim Mbadu Kikhela Kupika (22 November 1975 – 21 May 2001), appointed Titular Bishop of Belesasa
  - Bishop Raymond Ndudi (9 February 1967 – 22 November 1975)
  - Bishop André Jacques, C.I.C.M. (10 November 1959 – 9 February 1967); see below
- Vicars Apostolic of Boma (Roman rite), below
  - Bishop André Jacques, C.I.C.M. (23 December 1950 – 10 November 1959); see above
  - Bishop Joseph Vanderhoven, C.I.C.M. (26 February 1934 – 4 December 1949)

=== Coadjutor bishop ===
- Joachim Mbadu Kikhela Kupika (1975)

=== Auxiliary bishops ===
- Raymond (Nianga-Nzita) Ndudi (1962-1967), appointed Bishop here
- Cyprien Mbuka, C.I.C.M. (1997-2001), appointed Bishop here

=== Appointed bishops elsewhere ===
- Philibert Tembo Nlandu, C.I.C.M. , appointed Bishop of Budjala since 22 October 2009, (was Coadjutor Bishop there from 26 March 2007).

== Cathedral ==
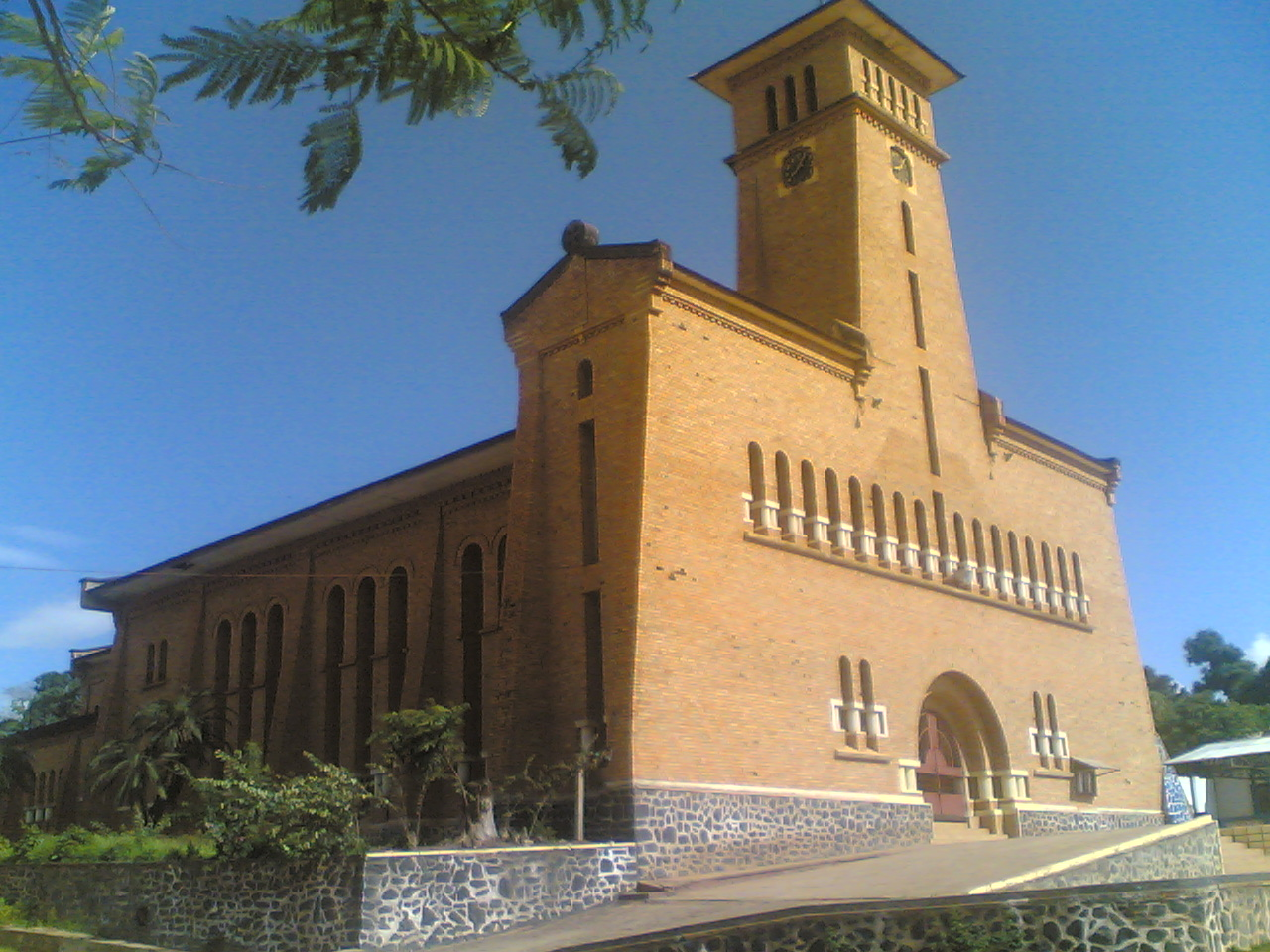
Boma Cathedral

Cathedral of Our Lady of the Assumption, Boma

== See also ==
- Roman Catholicism in the Democratic Republic of the Congo

== Sources ==
- GCatholic
- Catholic Hierarchy
