= Joachim Mbadu Kikhela Kupika =

Democratic Republic of the Congo Roman Catholic bishop (1932–2019)

- Bishop of Boma
- Church: Catholic Church
- Diocese: Diocese of Boma
- In office: 22 November 1975 – 21 May 2001
- Predecessor: Raymond Ndudi
- Successor: Cyprien Mbuka
- Other post: Titular Bishop of Belesasa (2001-2019)
- Previous posts: Titular Bishop of Zica (1975); Coadjutor Bishop of Boma (1975)

Orders
- Ordination: 12 April 1959 by André Jacques
- Consecration: 17 August 1975 by Albert Tshomba Yungu

Personal details
- Born: 10 March 1932 Belgian Congo, Belgian Empire
- Died: 12 March 2019 (aged 87) Kinshasa, Democratic Republic of the Congo

Joachim Mbadu Kikhela Kupika (10 March 1932 – 12 March 2019) was a Congolese Roman Catholic bishop.

== Early life ==
Mbadu Kikhela Kupika was born in Belgian Congo and was ordained to the priesthood in 1959. He served as coadjutor and diocesan bishop of the Roman Catholic Diocese of Boma, Democratic Republic of the Congo from 1975 to 2001.
