= Kisantu =

Town in the Democratic Republic of the Congo

Kisantu Inkisi
- Town
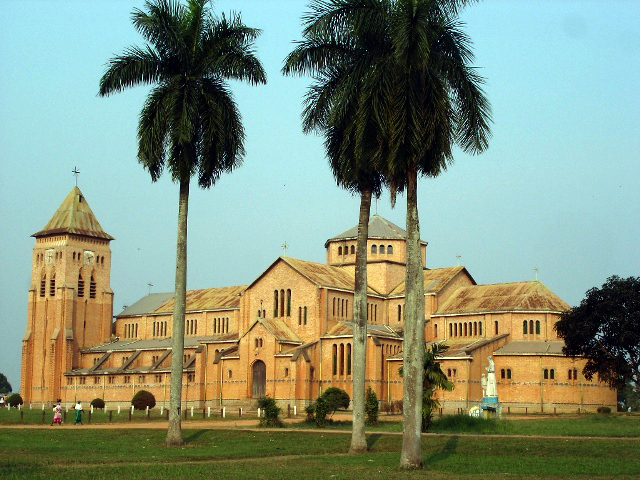
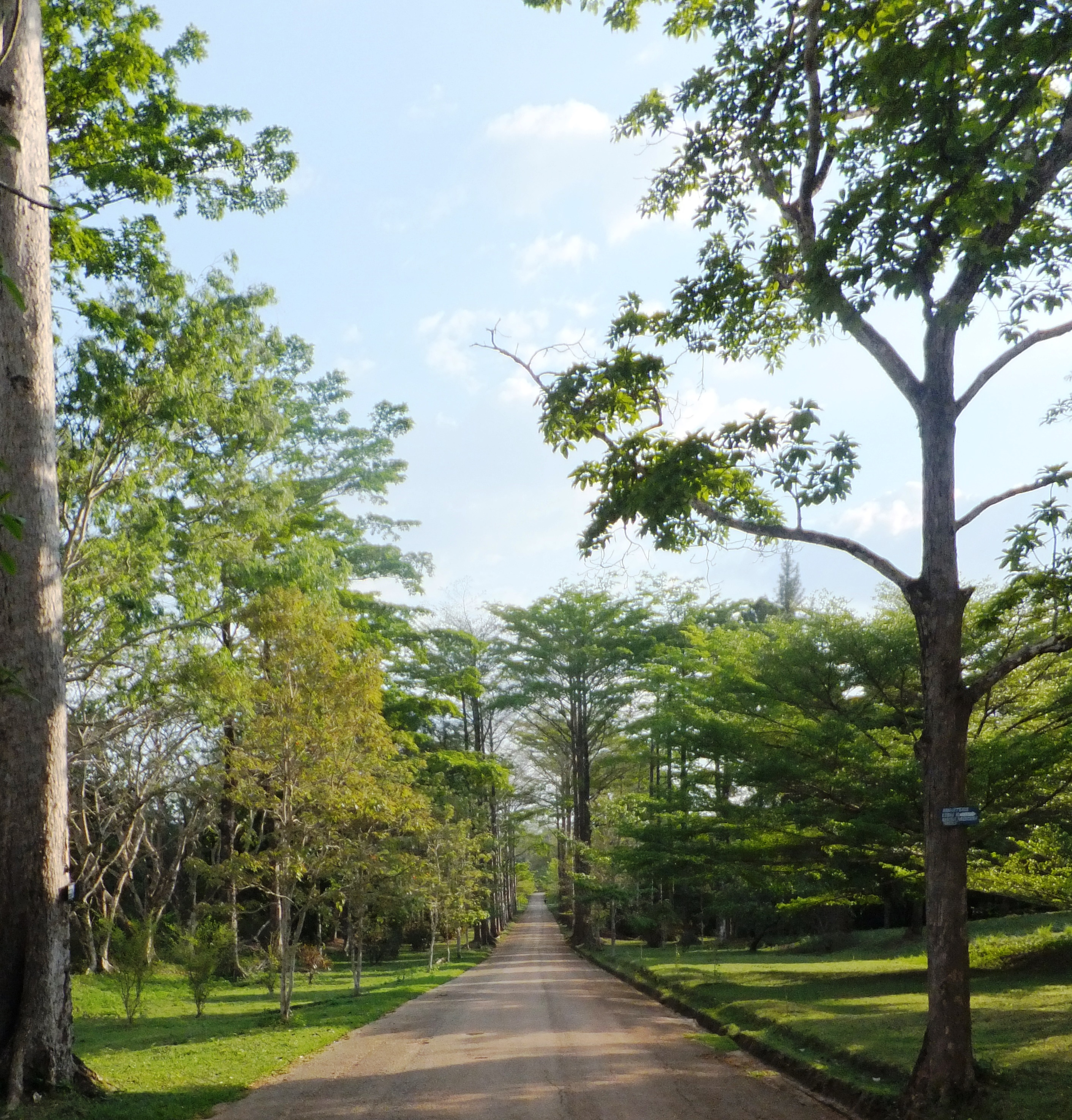

- Location within Democratic Republic of the Congo
- Coordinates: 05°07′44″S 15°05′05″E
- Country: DR Congo
- Province: Kongo Central

Population (2021)
  - Metro: 78,000
- Time zone: UTC+1 (CAT)
- National language: Kituba
- Climate: Aw

Inkisi, more commonly known as Kisantu, is a town in the western Democratic Republic of Congo, lying south west of Kinshasa, on the Inkisi River. It is known for its large cathedral and for its botanical garden, which includes an arboretum of indigenous trees.

== Location ==
Kisantu is located in Kongo Central Province, along the eastern bank of the Inkisi River, as it flows northwards to empty into the Congo River. It is approximately 231 kilometres (144 mi) northeast of the city of Matadi, the provincial capital. Kisantu is located approximately 104 kilometres (65 mi) southwest of the city of Kinshasa, the national capital.

The geographical coordinates of the town are: 05°07'44.0"S, 15°05'05.0"E (Latitude:-5.128889; Longitude:15.084722). The town is located at an average elevation of 404 metres (1,325 ft) above mean sea level.

== Overview ==
One of the tourist attractions to the town is the Kisantu Botanical Garden (KISA). This was established in 1900 by Father Justin Gillet, a Jesuit priest. Between 2004 and 2008, the garden was rehabilitated with "the support of the European Union and the National Botanic Garden of Belgium".

The botanical garden occupies an area that measures approximately 225 hectares (560 acres), bordered to the west by the Inkisi River. There are over 12.5 kilometres (8 mi) of roads and pedestrian pathways within the garden. The garden attracts researchers, botanists, naturalists, school children and ordinary tourists from inside and outside the Democratic Republic of the Congo.

== Population ==
As of October 2022, the article in this reference estimated the population of Kisantu Town at approximately 78,000 people.

== Transport ==
Kisantu is served by a station on the national railway system. It also has an airport. A good national road (N1), leads north to Kinshasa and southwest to he port city of Matadi.

== Prominent people ==
The legendary DR Congolese saxophonist, composer, bandleader, producer, record label founder, and music-business executive, Verckys Kiamuangana Mateta (19 May 1944 – 13 October 2022), was born in Kisantu.
