= Boma, Democratic Republic of the Congo =

Town in the Democratic Republic of the Congo

Boma
- City
- Ville de Boma
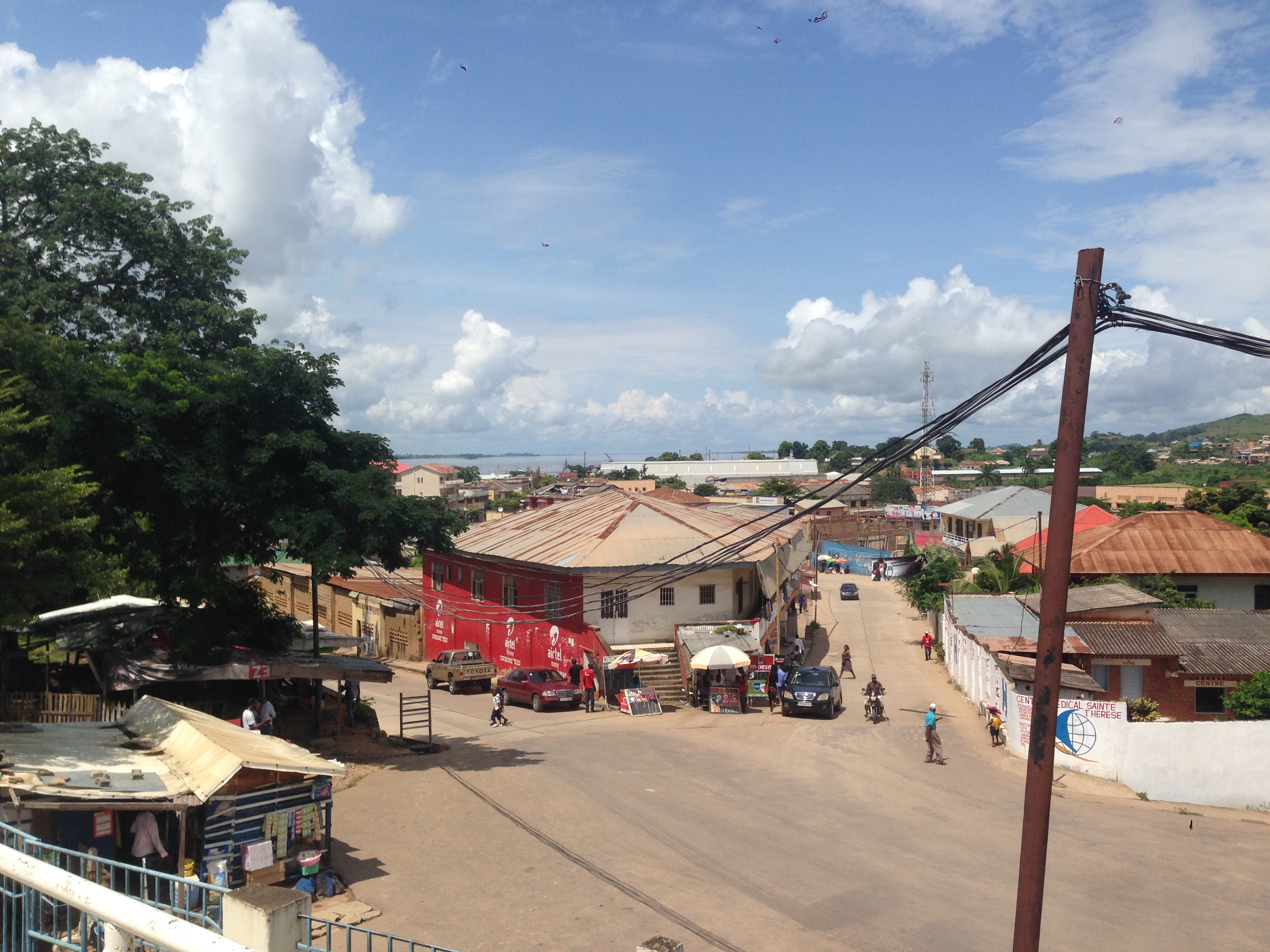
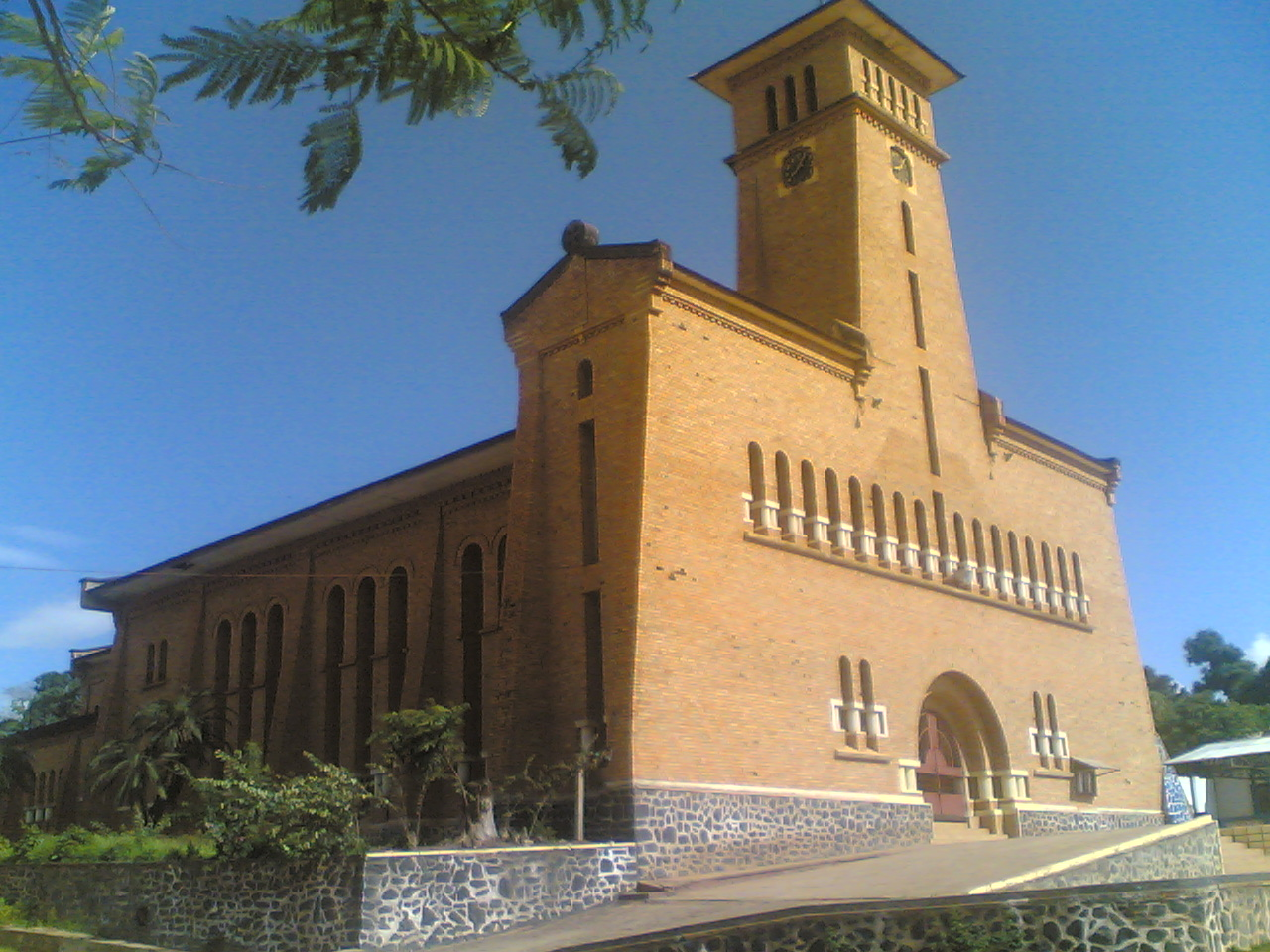
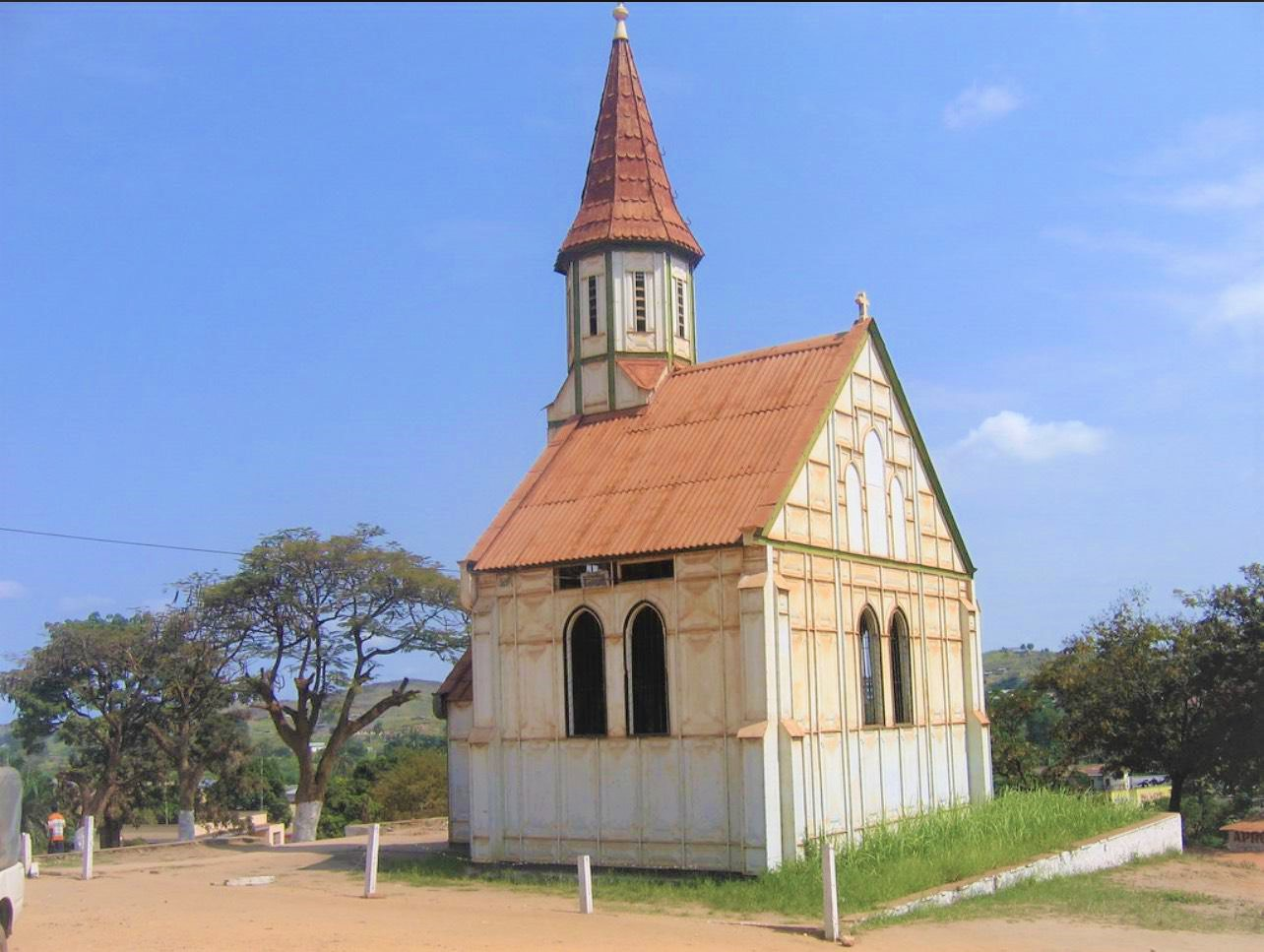
- Clockwise from top: View of Boma, Boma cathedral, Notre Dame de l'Assomption Church

- Location in Democratic Republic of the Congo
- Coordinates: 5°51′S 13°03′E
- Country: DR Congo
- Province: Kongo Central
- Founded: 16th century
- City status: 1963
- Communes: Kabondo, Kalamu, Nzadi

Government
  - Mayor: Senghor Mbutiyibi

Area
  - Total: 65 km^{2} (25 sq mi)
- Elevation: 61 m (200 ft)

Population (2012)
  - Total: 162,521
  - Density: 2,500/km^{2} (6,500/sq mi)
- Time zone: UTC+1 (West Africa Time)
- Climate: Aw

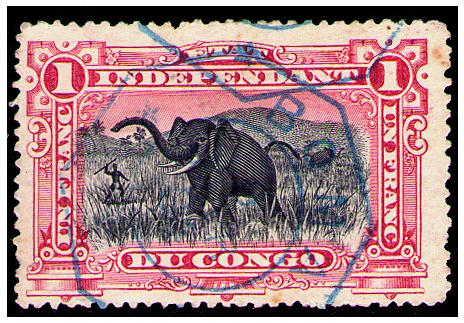
A stamp of the Congo Free State, used in Boma around 1900

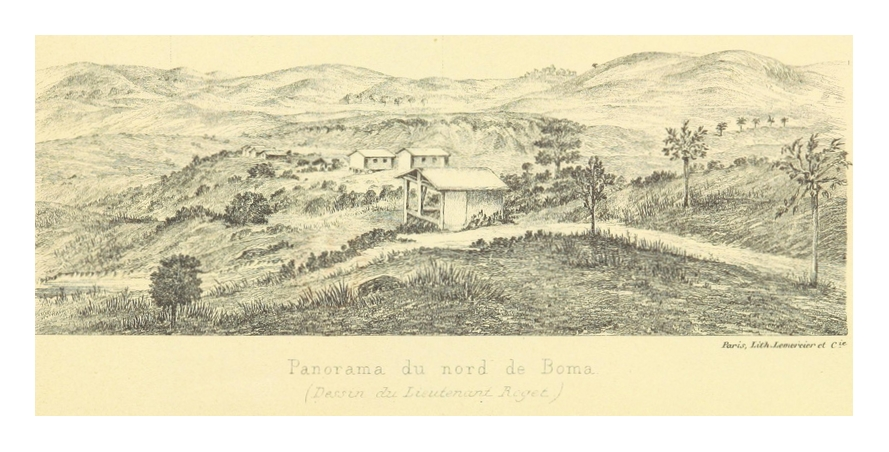
View to the north from Boma, 1889

Boma is a port town on the Congo River, some 100 kilometres (62 mi) upstream from the Atlantic Ocean, in the Kongo Central Province of the Democratic Republic of the Congo (DRC), adjacent to the border with Angola. It had an estimated population of 162,521 in 2012.

Boma was the capital city of the Congo Free State and Belgian Congo (the modern Democratic Republic of the Congo) from 1 May 1886 to 1923, when the capital was moved to Léopoldville (since renamed Kinshasa). The port handles exports of tropical timber, bananas, cocoa, and palm products.

== History ==
Boma was founded by European merchants in the 16th century as an entrepôt, including for the slave trade. Trade was chiefly in the hands of Dutch merchants, but British, French and Portuguese firms also had factories there. No European power exercised sovereignty, though claims were from time to time put forward by Portugal.

British explorer Henry Morton Stanley arrived here on 9 August 1877, after crossing Africa from east to west.

In 1884 the people of Boma were forced to grant a protectorate of their country to the International Association of the Congo, made up of European powers. In 1886 King Leopold of Belgium established the Congo Free State, designating Boma as its capital. He ran the state as his personal fiefdom for several years, nearly enslaving many Congolese with a private military, and abusing them to force rubber production. International outrage and action by the Belgian legislature resulted in the government taking over supervision of what was established as the colony of the Belgian Congo in 1908.

Boma continued as the capital of the Belgian Congo until 1923. Léopoldville, since renamed as Kinshasa, was designated as the new capital.

== Transport ==
Boma lies on the north bank of the Congo River, some 100 km upstream from Muanda, where the river flows into the Atlantic Ocean. The great width and depth of the river allow seagoing ships to reach Boma, which is the second-largest port of DR Congo, after Matadi. Between 1889 and 1984, the port was served by the Mayumbe line from Tshela. The line was initially built as 610 mm (24 inch) gauge in 1889 before being converted to 600 mm in 1932.

== Notable people ==
- Antoine-Roger Bolamba (1913–2002), politician and poet
- Claude Kiambe (born 2003), singer-songwriter

== Climate ==
Köppen-Geiger climate classification system classifies its climate as tropical wet and dry (Aw).

The highest record temperature was 41 °C (106 °F) on February 25, 1976, while the lowest record temperature was 10 °C (50 °F) on October 21, 1976.

Climate data for Boma
Month	Jan	Feb	Mar	Apr	May	Jun	Jul	Aug	Sep	Oct	Nov	Dec	Year
Record high °C (°F)	34 (93)	41 (106)	39 (102)	34 (93)	39 (102)	34 (93)	32 (90)	33 (91)	36 (97)	34 (93)	34 (93)	32 (90)	41 (106)
Mean daily maximum °C (°F)	32.6 (90.7)	33.4 (92.1)	33.8 (92.8)	33.6 (92.5)	32 (90)	29.5 (85.1)	26.7 (80.1)	28 (82)	29.4 (84.9)	31.6 (88.9)	32.4 (90.3)	32.3 (90.1)	31.3 (88.3)
Daily mean °C (°F)	28.9 (84.0)	29.5 (85.1)	29.8 (85.6)	29.5 (85.1)	28.4 (83.1)	26 (79)	23.5 (74.3)	24.8 (76.6)	26.2 (79.2)	28.4 (83.1)	28.8 (83.8)	28.7 (83.7)	27.7 (81.9)
Mean daily minimum °C (°F)	25.3 (77.5)	25.7 (78.3)	25.8 (78.4)	25.5 (77.9)	24.9 (76.8)	22.6 (72.7)	20.3 (68.5)	21.6 (70.9)	23.1 (73.6)	25.2 (77.4)	25.3 (77.5)	25.2 (77.4)	24.2 (75.6)
Record low °C (°F)	20 (68)	19 (66)	19 (66)	19 (66)	17 (63)	14 (57)	12 (54)	13 (55)	14 (57)	10 (50)	15 (59)	18 (64)	10 (50)
Average rainfall mm (inches)	83 (3.3)	112 (4.4)	126 (5.0)	173 (6.8)	69 (2.7)	1 (0.0)	1 (0.0)	2 (0.1)	8 (0.3)	50 (2.0)	149 (5.9)	92 (3.6)	866 (34.1)
Source 1: Climate-Data.org (altitude: 10 m)
Source 2: Voodoo Skies for record temperatures

== Gallery ==
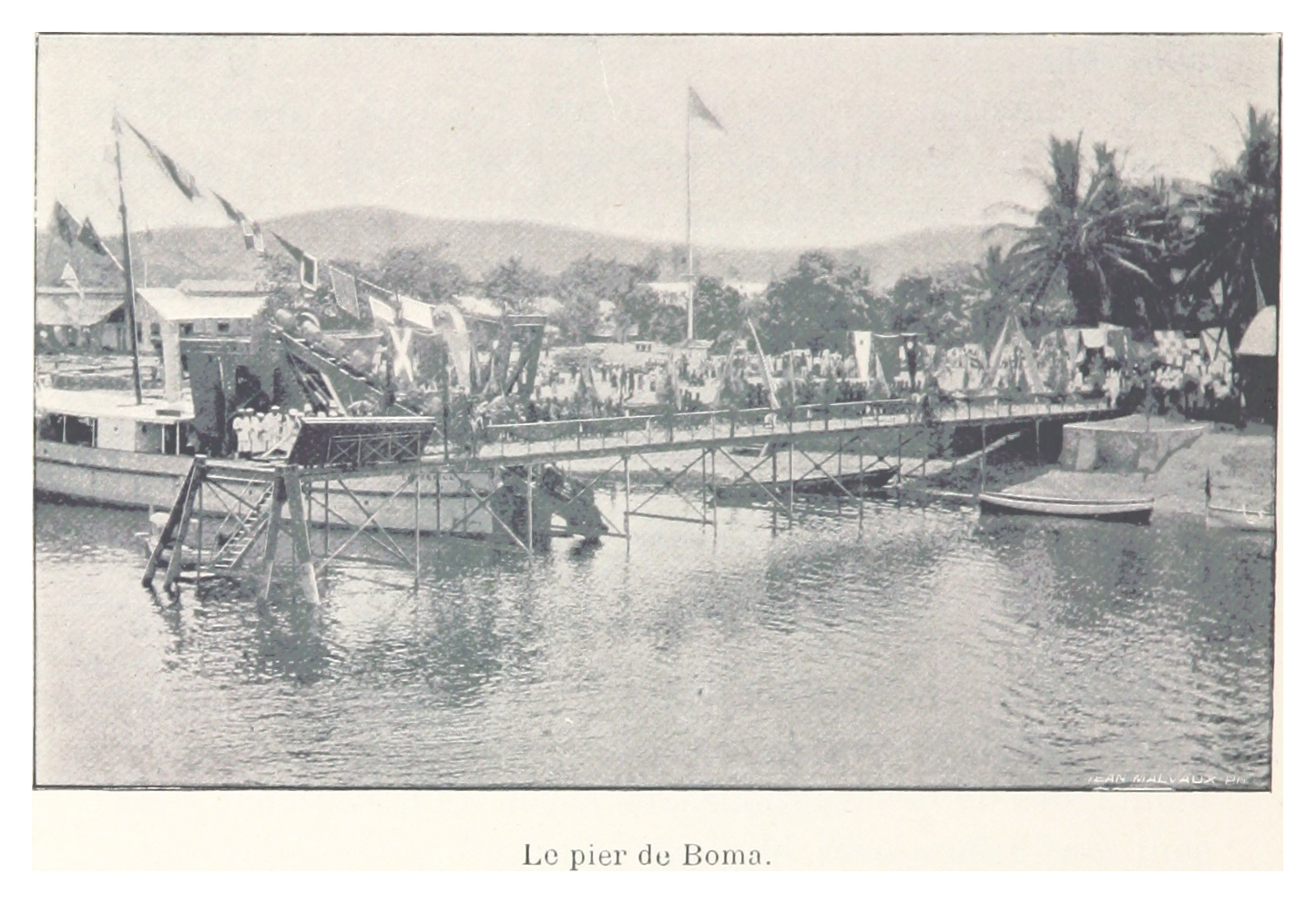
Boma pier, 1899

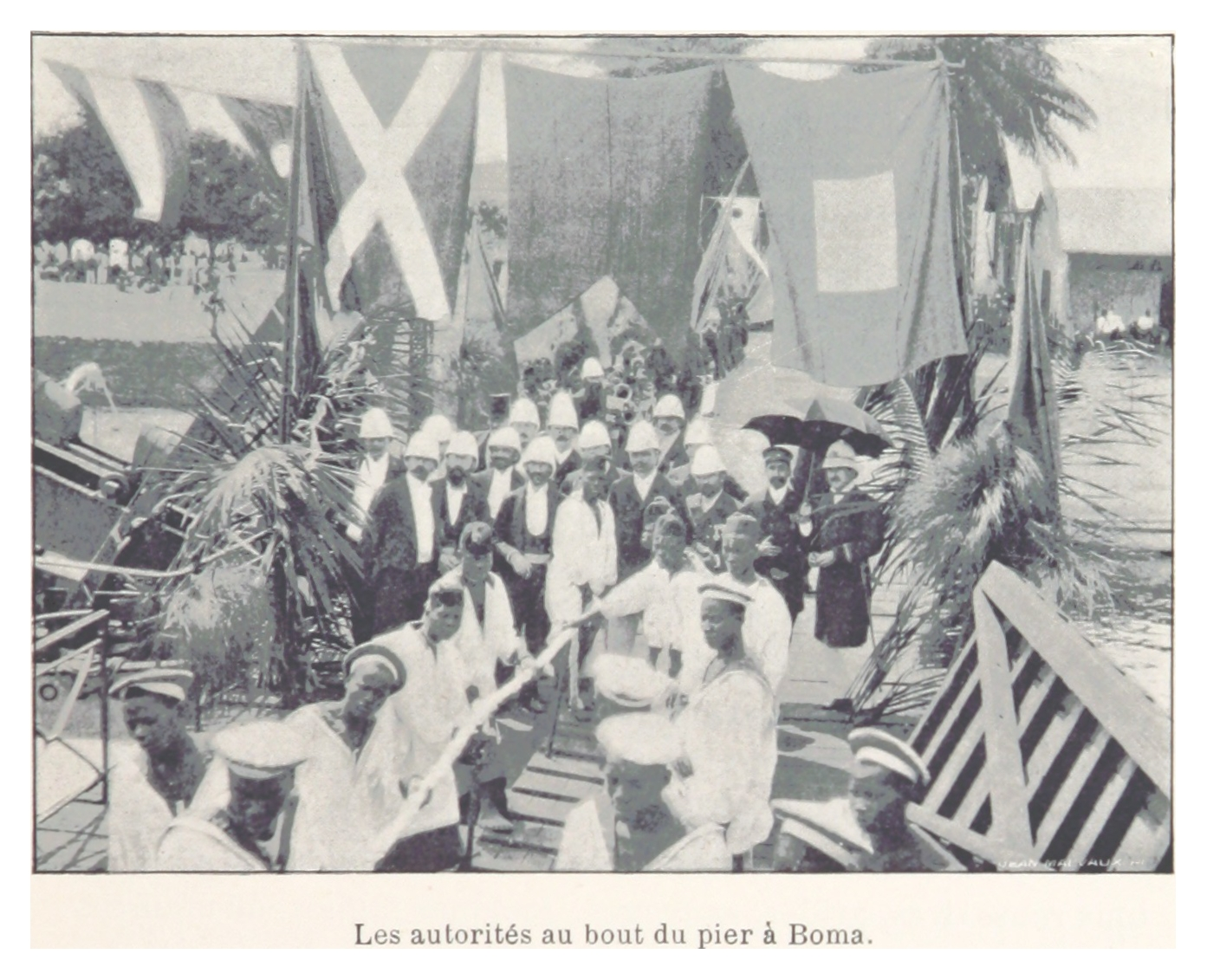
Authorities at the end of the pier, Boma, 1899

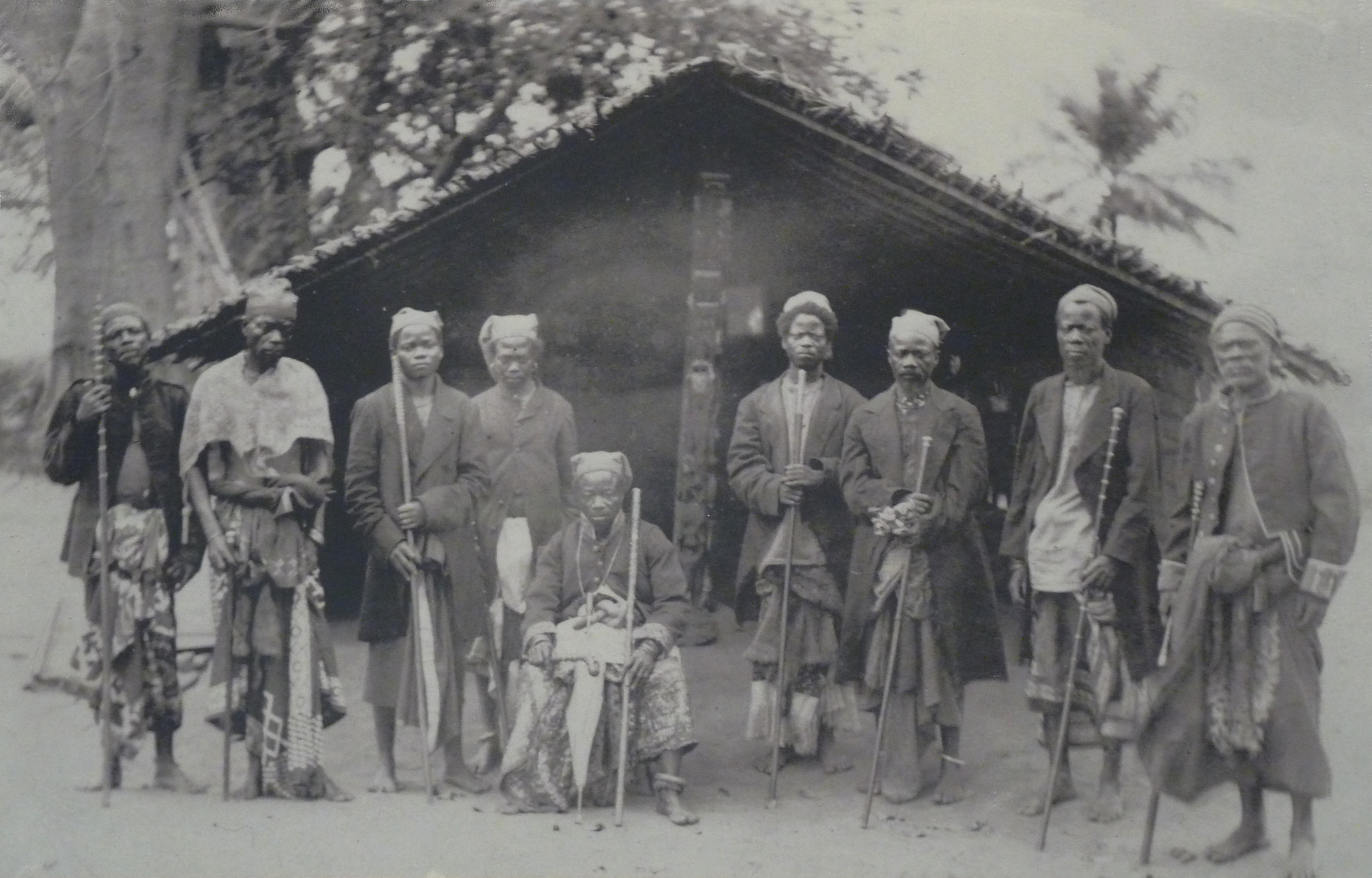
The nine old kings of Boma (phot. H. A. Shanu, 1898), Royal Museum for Central Africa

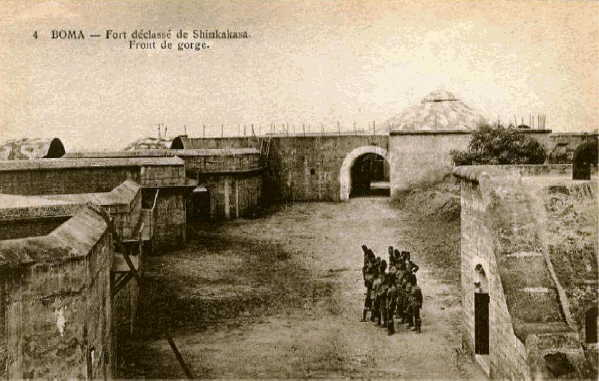
Fort de Shinkakasa – fortification on the Congo River near Boma

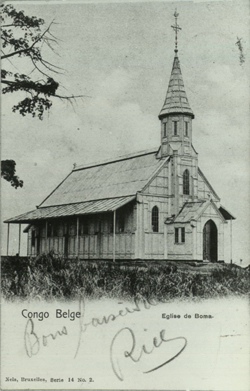
Church of Boma, which still exists; oldest in the country

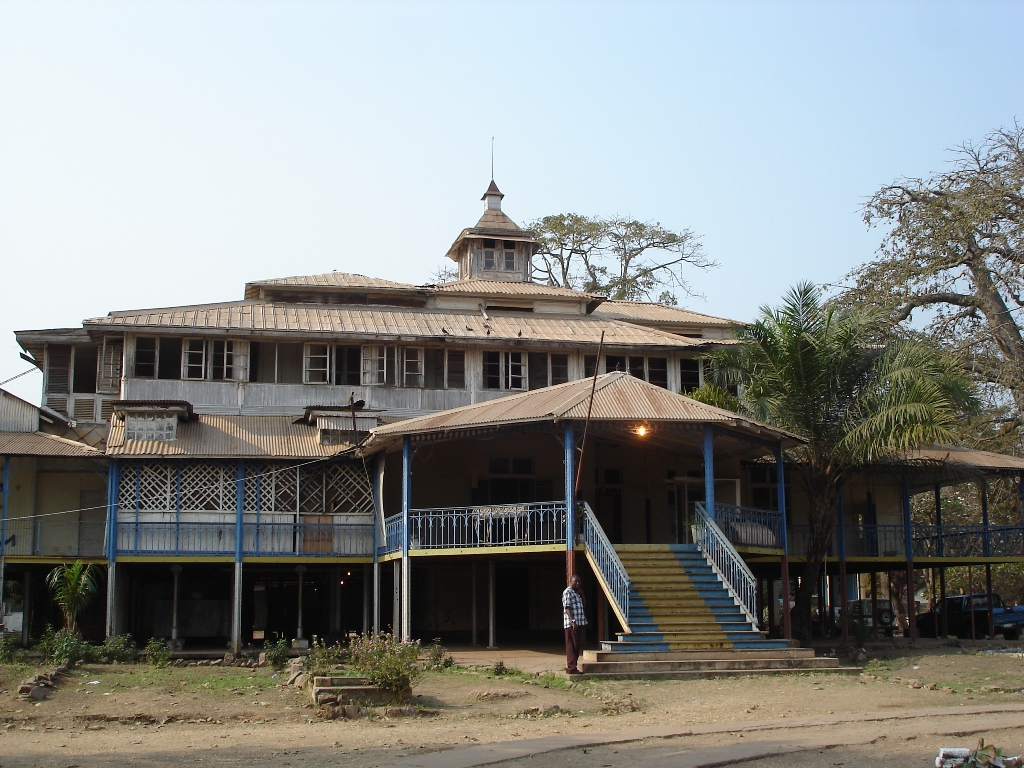
Residence of the Governor-General in Boma

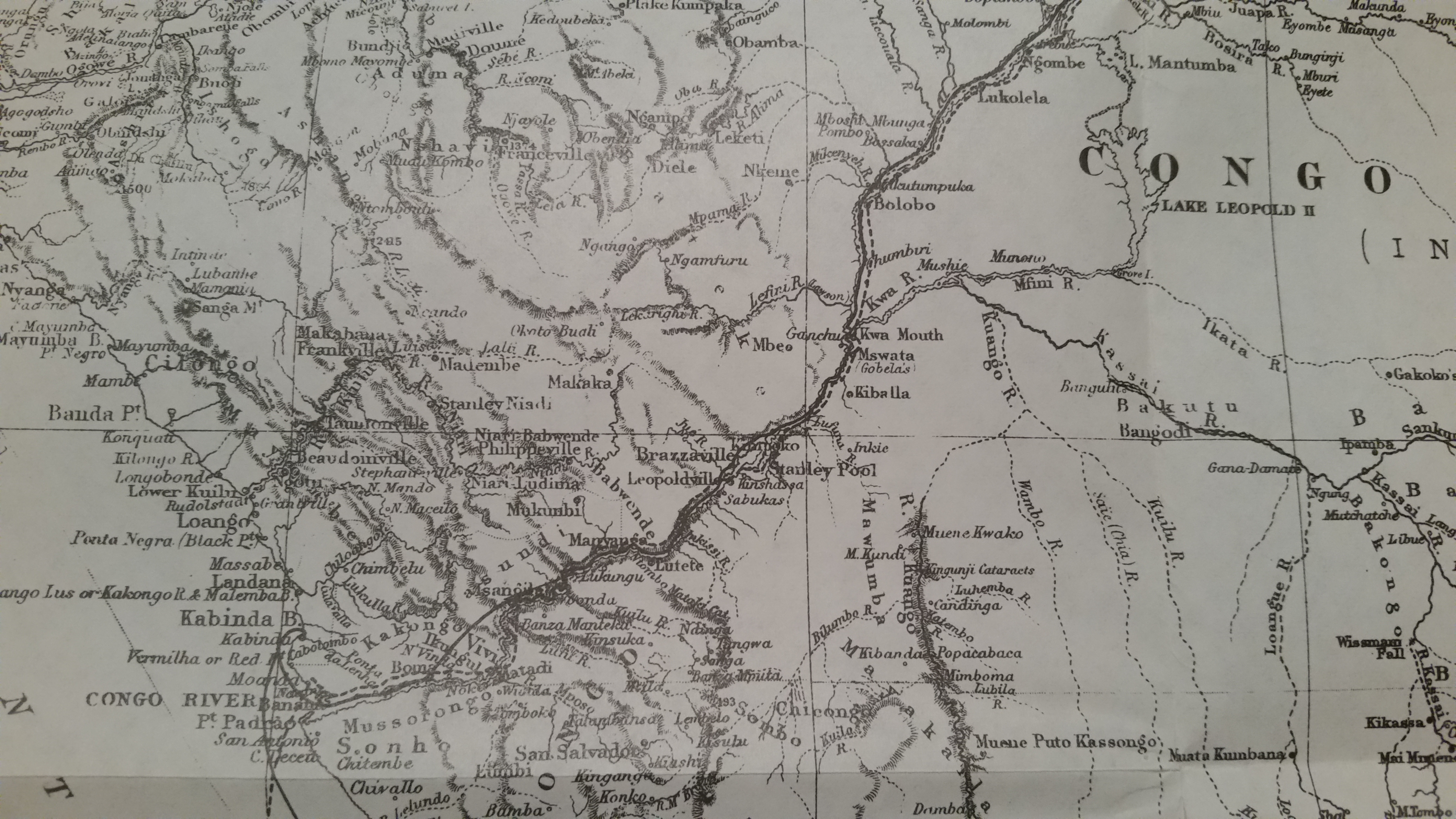
Henry Morton Stanley's map of the area during his expedition down the Congo River

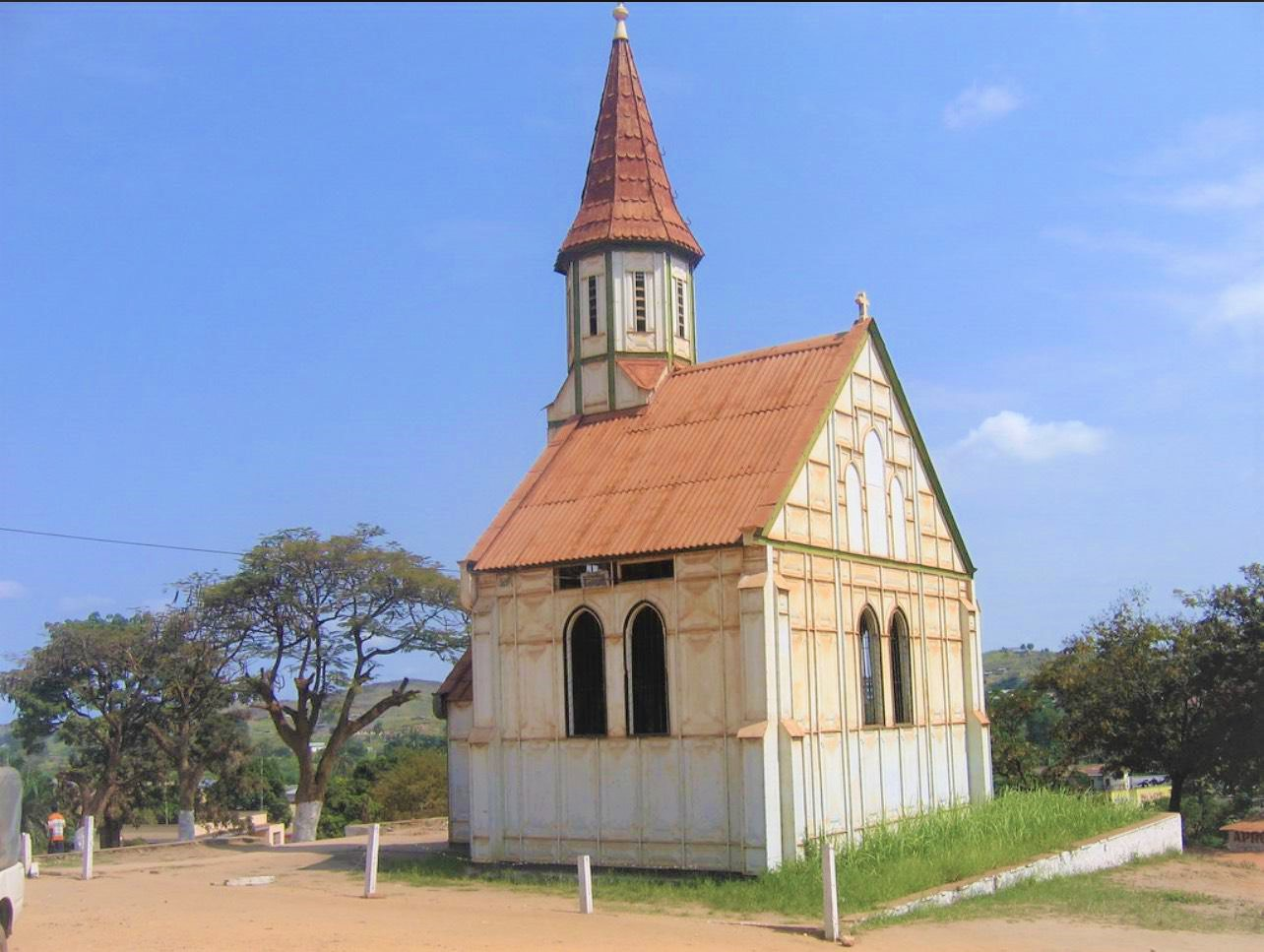
Church of Boma, January 2007

== See also ==
- Transport in the Democratic Republic of the Congo
- Roman Catholic Diocese of Boma
